= Sudanian savanna =

African region south of the Sahel

Sudan bioregion بِلَادُ السُّوْدَان
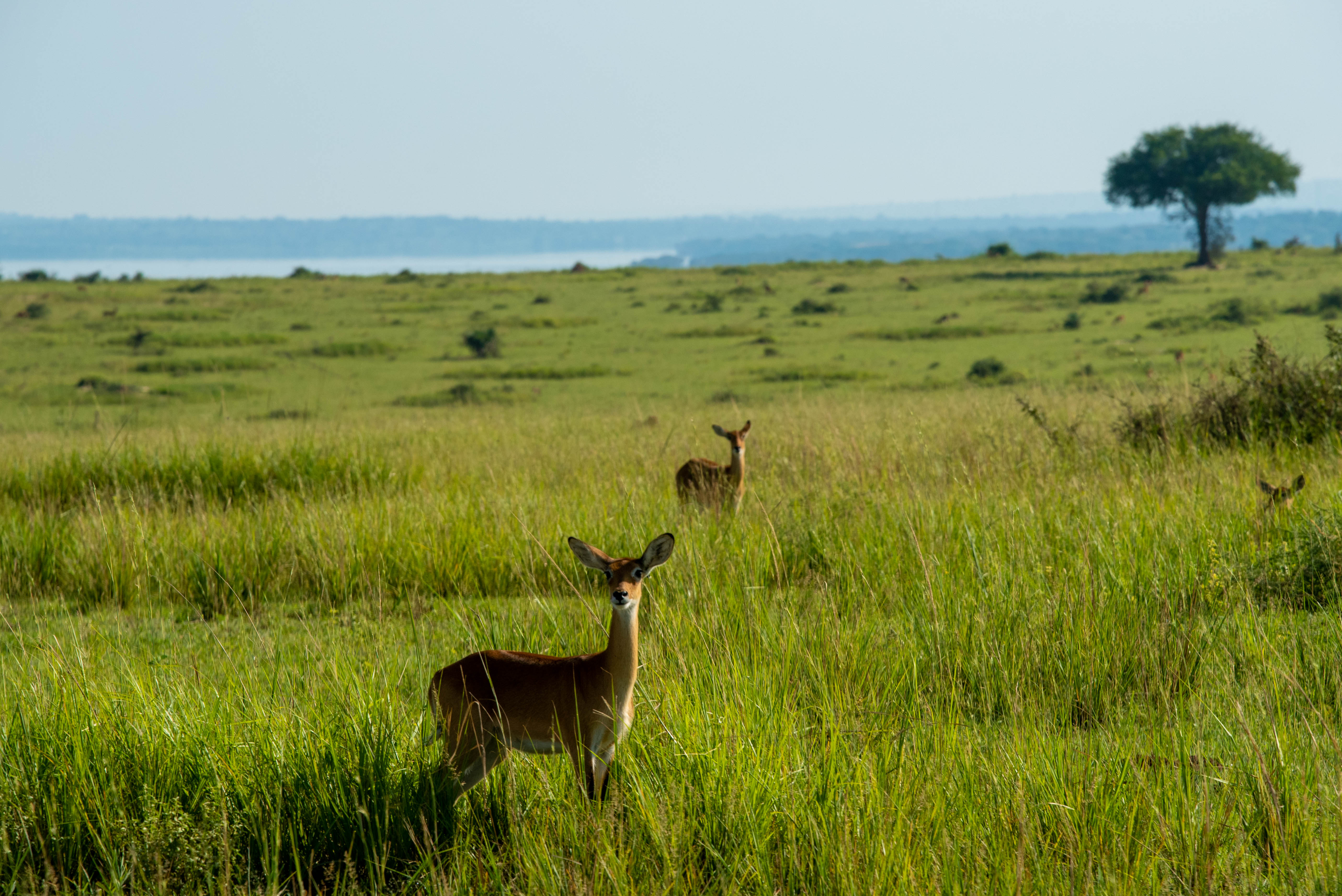
- Throughout the Sudan region's savanna grasslands, kob are found migrating along freshwater bodies

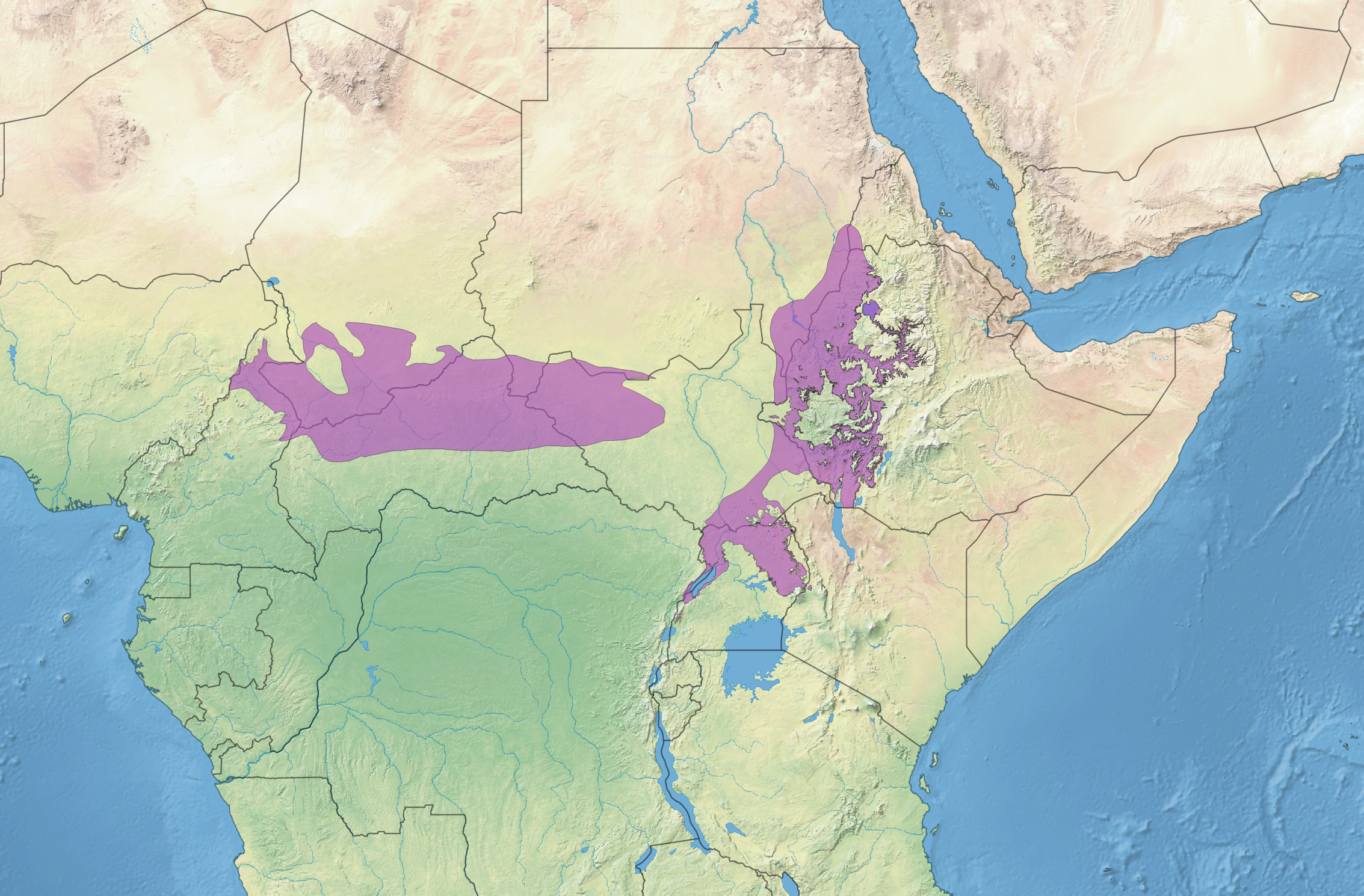
- Extension of the western and eastern ecoregions composing the Sudan bioregion and divided by the Mandara mountains

Ecology
- Realm: Afrotropical
- Biome: Tropical savanna
- Borders: Sahel; Sudd; Northern Acacia–Commiphora; forest–savanna mosaics (Victoria Basin, Mandara Plateau, Northern Congolian, Guinean)
- Animals: elephant, cheetah, giraffe, lion, buffalo, kob

Geography
- Area: 2,550,451 km^{2} (984,735 mi^{2})
- Rivers: White Nile, Niger and Chari
- Climate type: Tropical savanna (Aw)

Conservation
- Conservation status: Critical/endangered
- Global 200: priority
- Protected: 18.1%

The Sudanian savanna or Sudan region is a broad belt of tropical savanna that runs east and west across the African continent, from the Ethiopian Highlands in the east to the Atlantic Ocean in the west. It represents the central bioregion within the broader tropical savanna biome of the Afrotropical realm. The Sahel acacia savanna, a belt of drier grasslands, lies to the north, forming a transition zone between the Sudanian savanna and the Sahara Desert phytochorion. To the Sudan's south, the more humid forest-savanna mosaic forms a transition zone between the Sudanian savanna and the Guineo-Congolian forests that lie nearer the equator.

== Etymology ==
The name Sudan derives from Arabic بلاد السودان (bilād as-sūdān) 'Land of the Blacks', referring to Africa south of the Sahel, cf. the Berber equivalent Akal n-Iguinawen.

== Physiographic province ==
The Sudanian savanna is one of the three distinct physiographic provinces of the larger African Massive division. Physiography divides this province into three distinct physiographic sections, the Niger Basin, the Lake Chad Basin, and the Middle Nile Basin.

== Ecoregions ==
The World Wide Fund for Nature divides the Sudanian savanna bioregion into two ecoregions, separated by the Mandara Plateau:

- The East Sudanian savanna in East and Central Africa extends westwards from the western lowlands of Ethiopia to the Mandara Mountains.
- The West Sudanian savanna in West Africa runs from eastern Nigeria to The Gambia West Coast.

== Geography ==
The area is predominantly a plateau with river valleys of the White Nile, Chad and Niger. It extends over 5,000 km (3,100 mi) in a band several hundred kilometers wide across Africa. It stretches from the Atlantic Ocean in Senegal, through southern Mali (known as French Sudan when it was a French colony), Burkina Faso, southern Niger, northern Ghana, northern Nigeria, southern Chad, Central African Republic, southern Sudan and South Sudan to the Ethiopian Highlands.

== Climate ==
Average annual temperatures range from 23 to 29 °C (73 to 84 °F). Average temperatures in the coldest months are above 20 °C (68 °F) and above 30 °C (86 °F) in the hottest months. Daily temperatures fluctuate by up to 10–15 °C (18–27 °F). The summer monsoon brings rain from the equator. Annual precipitation ranges from 100–200 mm (3.9–7.9 in) in the north to 1,500–2,000 mm (59–79 in) in the south. During the dry winter season (Köppen Aw), the Harmattan northeasterly wind is bringing hot and dry air from the Sahara.

== Flora ==
The Sudanian savanna is characterized by the coexistence of trees and grasses. Dominant tree species are often belonging to the Combretaceae and Caesalpinioideae; some Acacia species are also important. The dominant grass species are usually Andropogoneae, especially the genera Andropogon and Hyparrhenia, on shallow soils also Loudetia and Aristida. Much of the Sudanian savanna region is used in the form of parklands, where useful trees, such as shea, baobab, locust-bean tree and others are spared from cutting, while sorghum, maize, millet or other crops are cultivated beneath.

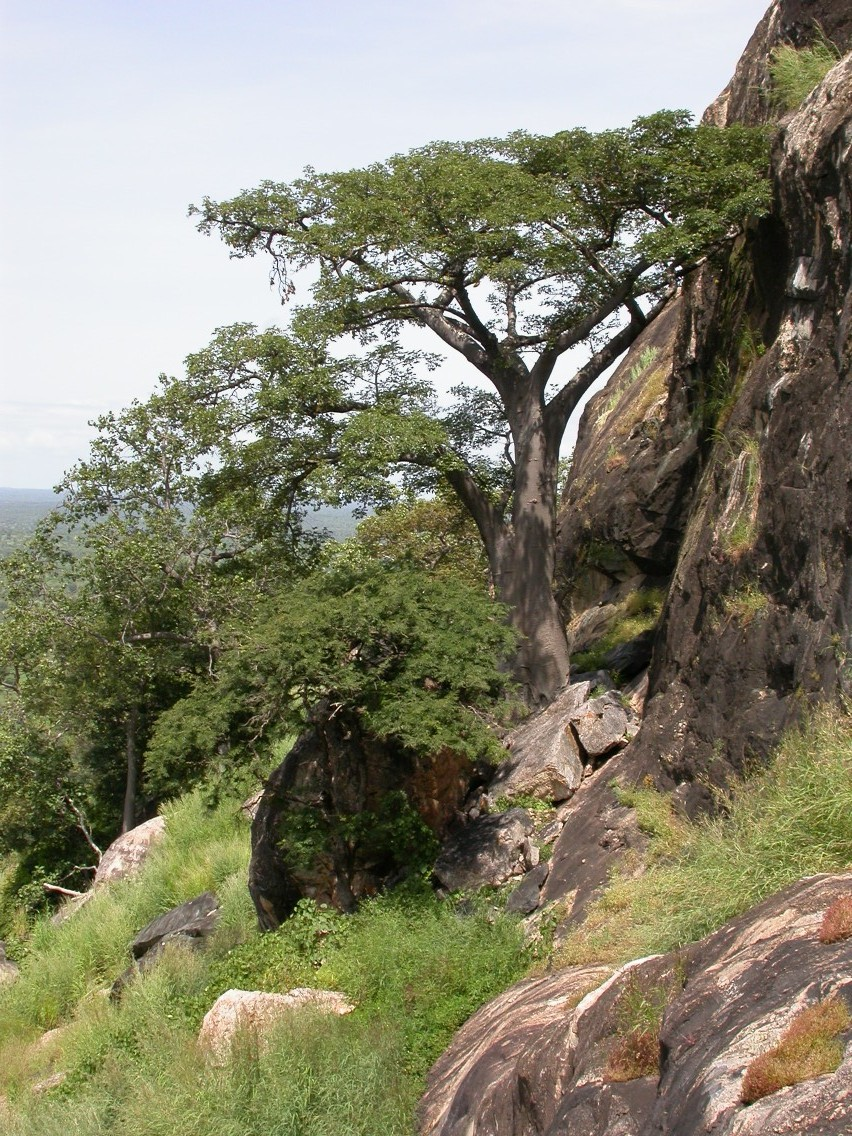
Sudanian savanna vegetation in Burkina Faso.

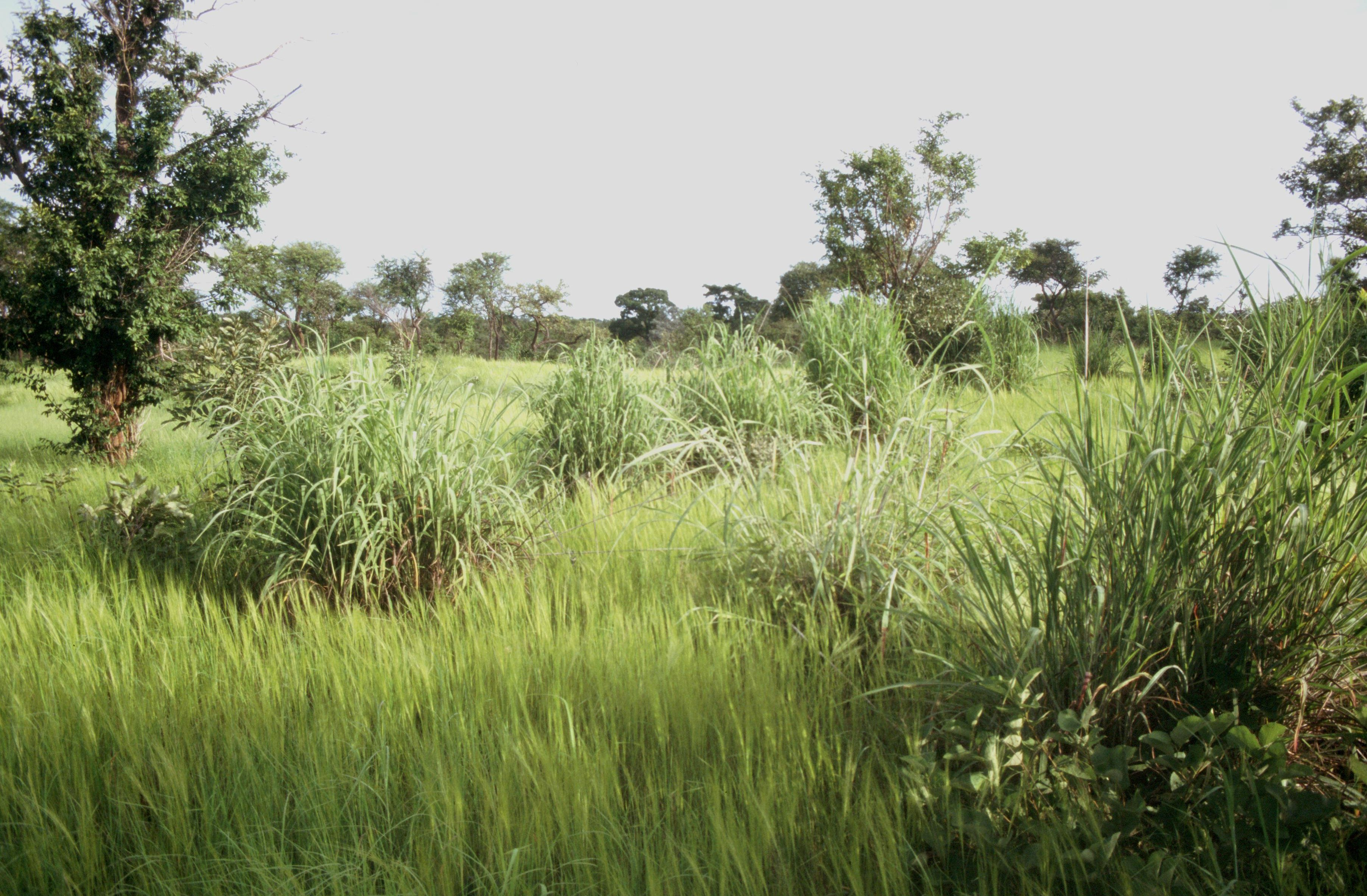
Sudanian savanna with bunchgrass tufts of Andropogon gayanus, Pama Reserve, Burkina Faso.

== Fauna ==
Many large mammals are native to the Sudanian savanna, including African bush elephant (Loxodonta africana), northern giraffe (Giraffa camelopardalis), giant eland (Taurotragus derbianus derbianus), roan antelope (Hippotragus equinus), African buffalo (Syncerus caffer brachyceros), lion (Panthera leo), leopard (Panthera pardus) cheetah (Acinonyx jubatus), and African wild dog (Lycaon pictus). Most large mammals are now very limited in range and numbers.

== Land use ==
The Sudanian savanna is used by both pastoralists and farmers. Cattle are predominantly the livestock kept, but in some areas, sheep and goats are also kept. The main crops grown are sorghum and millet which are suited to the low levels of rainfall. With increasing levels of drought since the 1970s, pastoralists have needed to move southwards to search for grazing areas and have come into conflict with more settled agriculturalists.

== History ==
According to some modern historians, of all the regions of Africa, western Sudan "is the one that has seen the longest development of agriculture, of markets and long-distance trade, and of complex political systems." It is also the first region "south of the Sahara where African Islam took root and flowered."

=== Middle Ages ===
Its medieval history is marked by the caravan trade. The sultanates of eastern Sudan were Darfur, Bagirmi, Sennar and Wadai. In central Sudan, Kanem–Bornu Empire and the Hausa Kingdoms. To the west were Wagadou, Manden, Songhay and the Mossi. Later, the Fula people spread to a wide area. During the European colonial period, French Sudan and Anglo-Egyptian Sudan were created in the territories that now form the states of Mali, and Sudan and South Sudan, respectively.

=== Slave trade ===
Early on in the first millennium, many people from the Sudan were used as "a steady steam of slaves for the Mediterranean world" in the Saharan slave trade. With the arrival of the Portuguese in the fifteenth century, "people were directed to the Atlantic slave trade," totaling over a thousand years for the Saharan and four centuries for the Atlantic trades. As a result, slavery critically shaped the institutions and systems of the Sudan. The Portuguese first arrived at Senegambia and found that slavery was "well established" in the region, used to "feed the courts of coastal kings as it was used in the medieval empires of the interior." Between the process of capture, enslavement, and "incorporation into a new community, the slave had neither rights nor any social identity." As a result, the identity of people who were enslaved "came from membership in a corporate group, usually based on kinship."

=== Modern ===
During the period of European colonization, French Sudan was created in the area that would become Mali and Anglo-Egyptian Sudan was formed in what would become the present Sudanese and South Sudanese states.

== See also ==
- Jews of Bilad el-Sudan
- Neolithic Subpluvial — ancient "Green Sahara"
- Sub-Saharan Africa
