= List of protected areas of Burkina Faso =

Overview of IUCN Protected area - WAP (W, Arli, Pendjari) area - Niger, Burkina Faso, and Benin

The following is a list of protected areas of Burkina Faso.

== National parks ==
Burkina Faso has four national parks:

- Arli National Park, existing since 1954 (see also Arly-Singou)
- Deux Balés National Park
- Kaboré Tambi National Park (formerly Pô National Park), existing since 1976
- W of the Niger National Park, a transfrontier park existing since 1957

== Unesco Biosphere reserve ==
- Mare aux Hippopotames
- Arli National Park, since 2018

== Ramsar sites ==
- Mare d'Oursi

== Complete reserves ==
Burkina Faso has three complete reserves:

- Bontioli Reserve, existing since 1957; 127 km^{2}, located in the province of Bougouriba (southwestern part of the country)
- Madjoari Reserve, existing since 1970; 170 km^{2}, located in the province of Tapoa (eastern part of the country)
- Singou Reserve, existing since 1955; 1926 km^{2}, located in the province of Gourma (eastern part of the country)

== Partial reserves ==
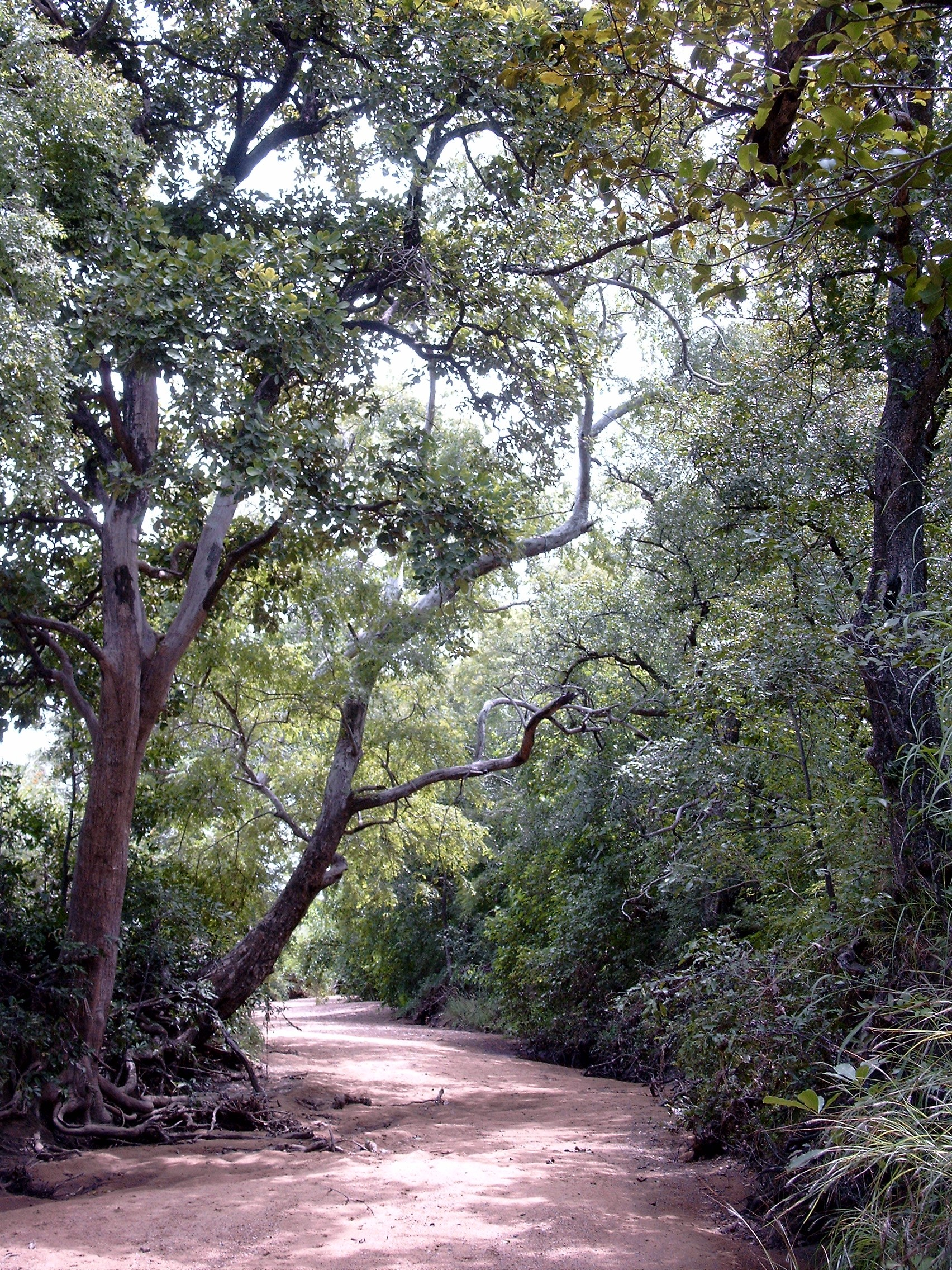
Partial Reserve of Pama

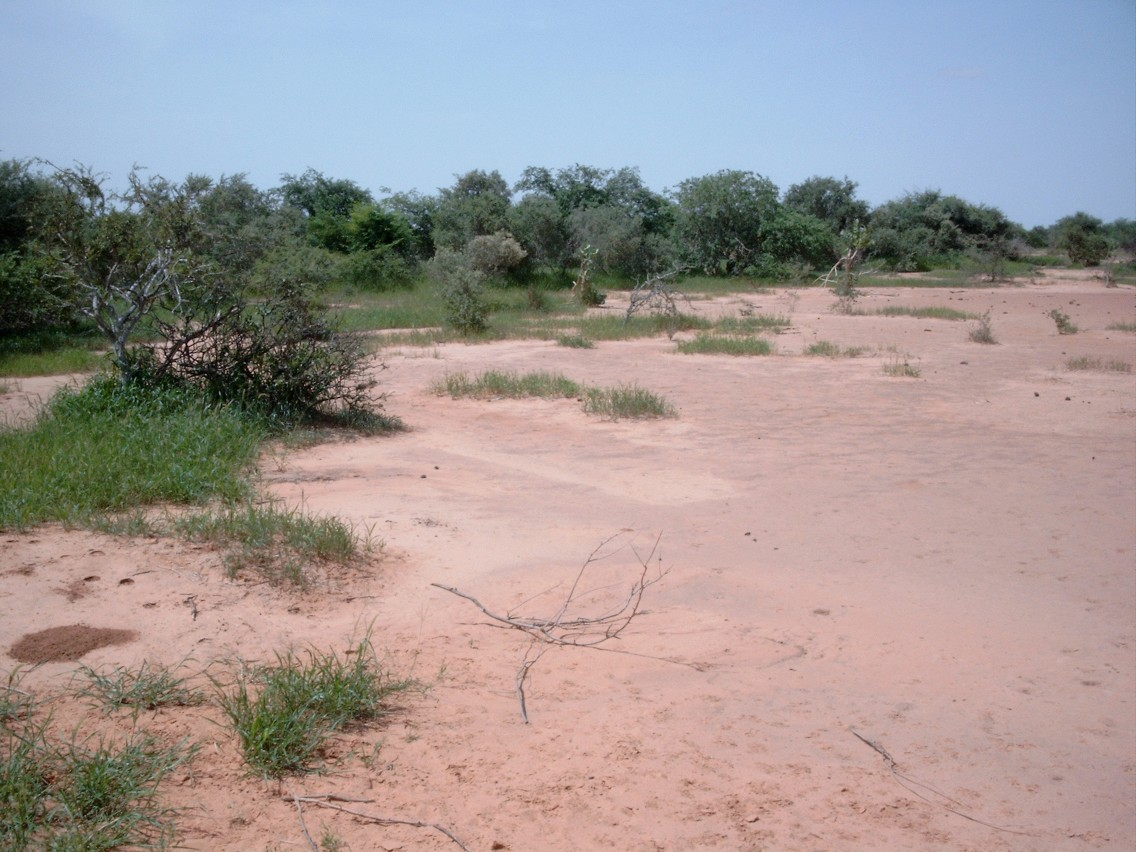
Sylvo-Pastoral and Partial Faunal Reserve of the Sahel: Tiger bush

Burkina Faso has six partial reserves:

- Partial Reserve of Arly, established in 1954, 900 km^{2}, province of Gourma (eastern part of the country)
- Partial Reserve of Kourtiagou, established in 1957, 510 km^{2}, in the province of Tapoa (eastern part of the country)
- Partial Reserve of Nakéré, established in 1957, 365 km^{2}, in the province of Bougouriba (southwestern part of the country)
- Partial Reserve of Pama, established in 1955, 2237 km^{2}, in the province of Kompienga
- Sylvo-Pastoral and Partial Faunal Reserve of the Sahel, in the very north of the country

== Other reserves from IUCN-Categories I-VI ==
- Nazinga Game Ranch (Ranch de Nazinga)

== Protected forests ==
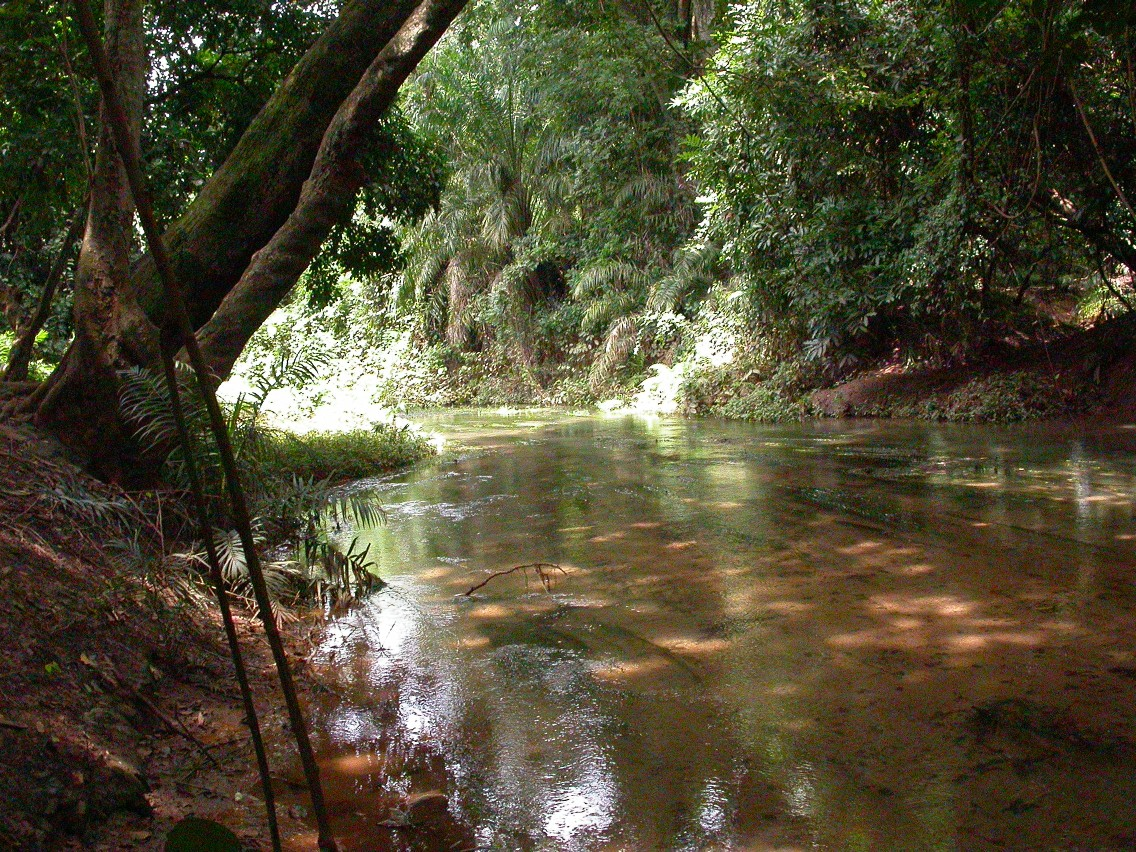
Forêt classée de la Kou

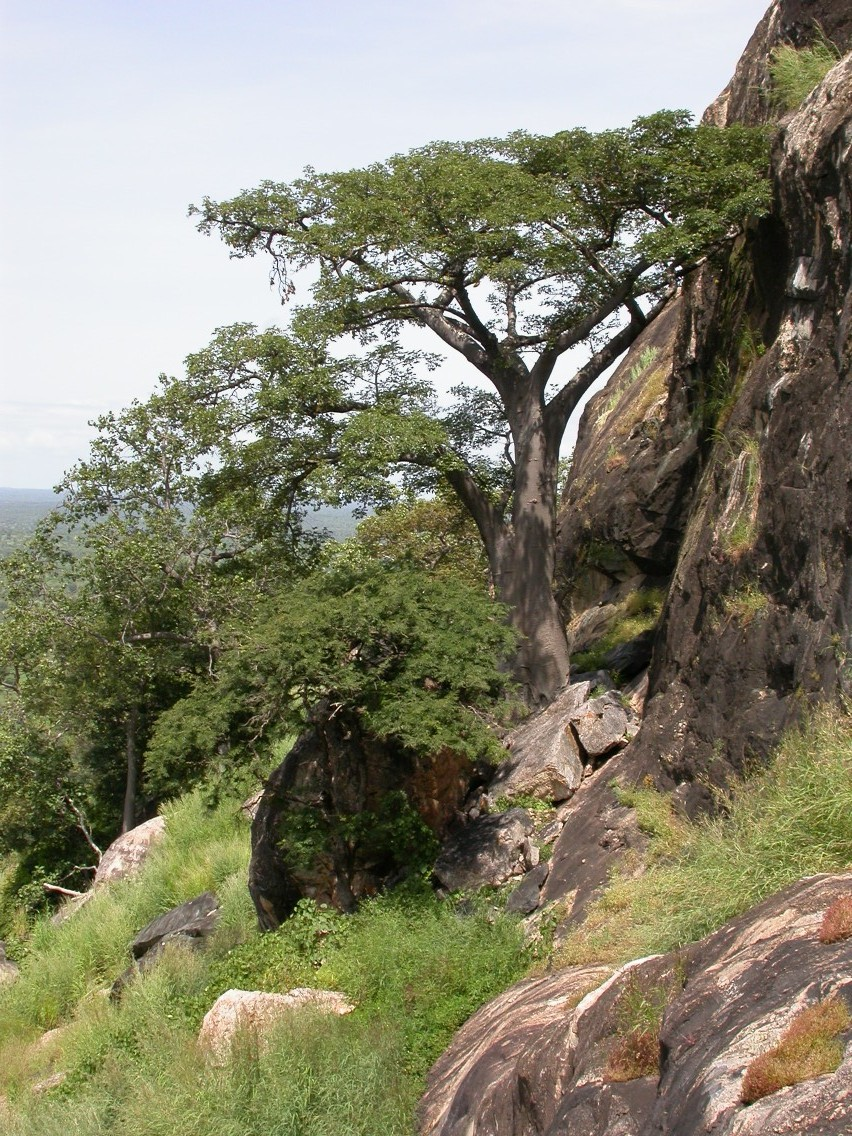
Forêt classée du Pic de Nahouri

Burkina Faso also has several protected forests:

- Boulon Forest, province la province de la Comoé (Cascades-Ouest du pays)
- Deux Balés Forest, province des Balés (Boucle du Mouhoun), see Deux Balés National Park
- Dibon Forest, province du Tuy
- Dida Forest, province de la Comoé (Cascades-Ouest du pays)
- Diéfoula Forest, province de la Comoé (Cascades-Ouest du pays)
- Forêt classée de Babolo (Provinz Comoé, 5.5 km^{2})
- Forêt classée de Bahon (Provinz Houet, 16 km^{2})
- Forêt classée de Bambou (Provinz Houet, 18 km^{2})
- Forêt classée de Bansié (Provinz Houet, 3 km^{2})
- Forêt classée du Barrage de Ouagadougou (Provinz Kadiogo, 2.6 km^{2})
- Forêt classée de Bérégadougou (Provinz Comoé, 50 km^{2})
- Forêt classée de Bissiga (Provinz Oubritenga, 41 km^{2})
- Forêt classée de Bonou (Provinz Mouhoun, 17 km^{2})
- Forêt classée de Bontioli (Provinz Bougouriba, 295 km^{2})
- Forêt classée de Bougouriba (Provinz Bougouriba, 85 km^{2})
- Forêt classée de Bounouna (Provinz Comoé, 13 km^{2})
- Forêt classée de Dan (Provinz Houet, 43 km^{2})
- Forêt classée de Dem (Provinz Sanmatenga, 3.5 km^{2})
- Forêt classée de Dindéresso (Provinz Houet, 85 km^{2})
- Forêt classée de Gonsé (Provinz Oubritenga, 60 km^{2})
- Forêt classée de Gouandougou (Provinz Comoé, 95 km^{2})
- Forêt classée de Kalio (Provinz Sanguié, 120 km^{2})
- Forêt classée de Kapo (Provinz Houet, 99 km^{2})
- Forêt classée de Kari (Provinz Mouhoun, 130 km^{2})
- Forêt classée de Koa (Provinz Houet, 3.5 km^{2})
- Forêt classée de Kongoko (Provinz Comoé, 270 km^{2})
- Forêt classée de la Kou (Provinz Houet, 1.17 km^{2})
- Forêt classée de Koulbi (Provinz Poni, 400 km^{2})
- Forêt classée de Koulima (Provinz Houet, 21.5 km^{2})
- Forêt classée du Mare aux Hippopotames (Provinz Houet, 19 2 km^{2})
- Forêt classée de Maro (Provinz Houet, 500 km^{2})
- Forêt classée de Nabéré (Provinz Bougouriba, 365 km^{2})
- Forêt classée de Nakambé (Provinz Oubritenga, 980 km^{2})
- Forêt classée de Nasébou (Provinz Mouhoun, 140 km^{2})
- Forêt classée de Nazinga (Provinz Nahouri, 383 km^{2})
- Forêt classée de Niangoloko (Provinz Comoé, 66.54 km^{2})
- Forêt classée de Niouma (Provinz Passoré, 7.35 km^{2})
- Forêt classée de Ouilingoré (Provinz Boulgou, 68.5 km^{2})
- Forêt classée de Ouoro (Provinz Mouhoun, 140 km^{2})
- Forêt classée de Péni (Provinz Houet, 12 km^{2})
- Forêt classée du Pic de Nahouri (Provinz Nahouri, 8.36 km^{2})
- Forêt classée de Sâ (Provinz Mouhoun, 54 km^{2})
- Forêt classée de la Sissili (Provinz Sissili, 327 km^{2})
- Forêt classée de Sitenga (Provinz Kouritenga, 8.4 km^{2})
- Forêt classée de Sorobouty (Provinz Mouhoun, 58 km^{2})
- Forêt classée de la Source du Mouhoun (Provinz Comoé, 1 km^{2})
- Forêt classée de Sourou (Provinz Sourou, 140 km^{2})
- Forêt classée de Téré (Provinz Houet, 107 km^{2})
- Forêt classée de Tissé (Provinz Mouhoun, 215 km^{2})
- Forêt classée de Toroba (Provinz Mouhoun, 27 km^{2})
- Forêt classée de Tougouri (Provinz Namentenga, 0.4 km^{2})
- Forêt classée de Toumousséni (Provinz Comoé, 25 km^{2})
- Forêt classée de Tuy (Provinz Mouhoun, 500 km^{2})
- Forêt classée de Twéssé (Provinz Passoré, 4.9 km^{2})
- Forêt classée de Wayen (Provinz Ganzourgou, 120 km^{2})
- Forêt classée de Yabo (Provinz Sanmatenga, 10 km^{2})
- Forêt classée de Yakala (Provinz Boulgou, 16 km^{2})
- Forêt classée de Yendéré (Provinz Comoé, 7 km^{2})
- Forêt classée de Ziga (Provinz Oubritenga, 90 km^{2})
- Laba Forest, province du Sanguié (Centre-Ouest du pays)
- Logoniégué Forest, province de la Comoé (Cascades-Ouest du pays)
- Koflandé Forest, province de la Comoé (Cascades-Ouest du pays)
- Mou Forest, province du Tuy (Hauts-Bassins-Ouest du pays)
- Pâ Forest, province des Balés (Boucle du Mouhoun)
