= Laba =

Laba, Łaba, or LABA may refer to:

== Places ==
- Laba River, in Russia
- Bolshaya Laba River, in Russia
- Wadi Laba River, in Eritrea
- Laba Forest, protected forest in Burkina Faso
- Laba Township, in Lancang Lahu Autonomous County, Yunnan, China

== People ==
- Izabella Łaba (born 1966), Polish-Canadian mathematician
- Kodjo Fo-Doh Laba (born 1992), Togolese footballer
- Matías Laba (born 1991), Argentine footballer
- Noah Laba (born 2003), American ice hockey player
- Roman Laba (born 1966), Ukrainian football striker
- Laba Sosseh (1943–2007), Gambian son and salsa singer and composer

== Other uses ==
- Laba Festival, traditional Chinese holiday
- Libera Accademia di Belle Arti (LABA), Italian academy of Fine Arts
- Long-acting beta-adrenoceptor agonist (LABA), medication
- Laba language

== See also ==
- R v Laba
