= Sahel =

Biogeographical region in Africa

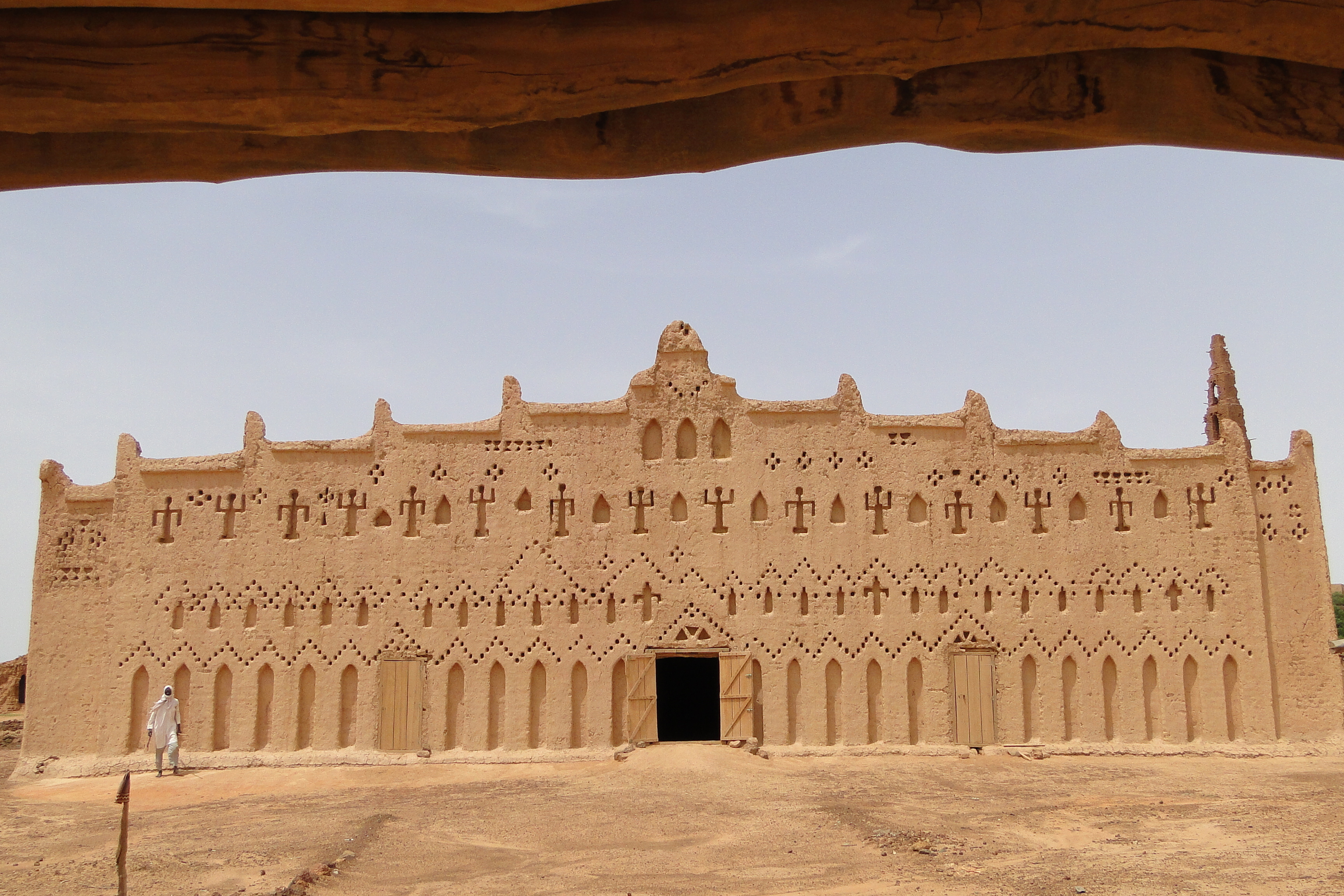
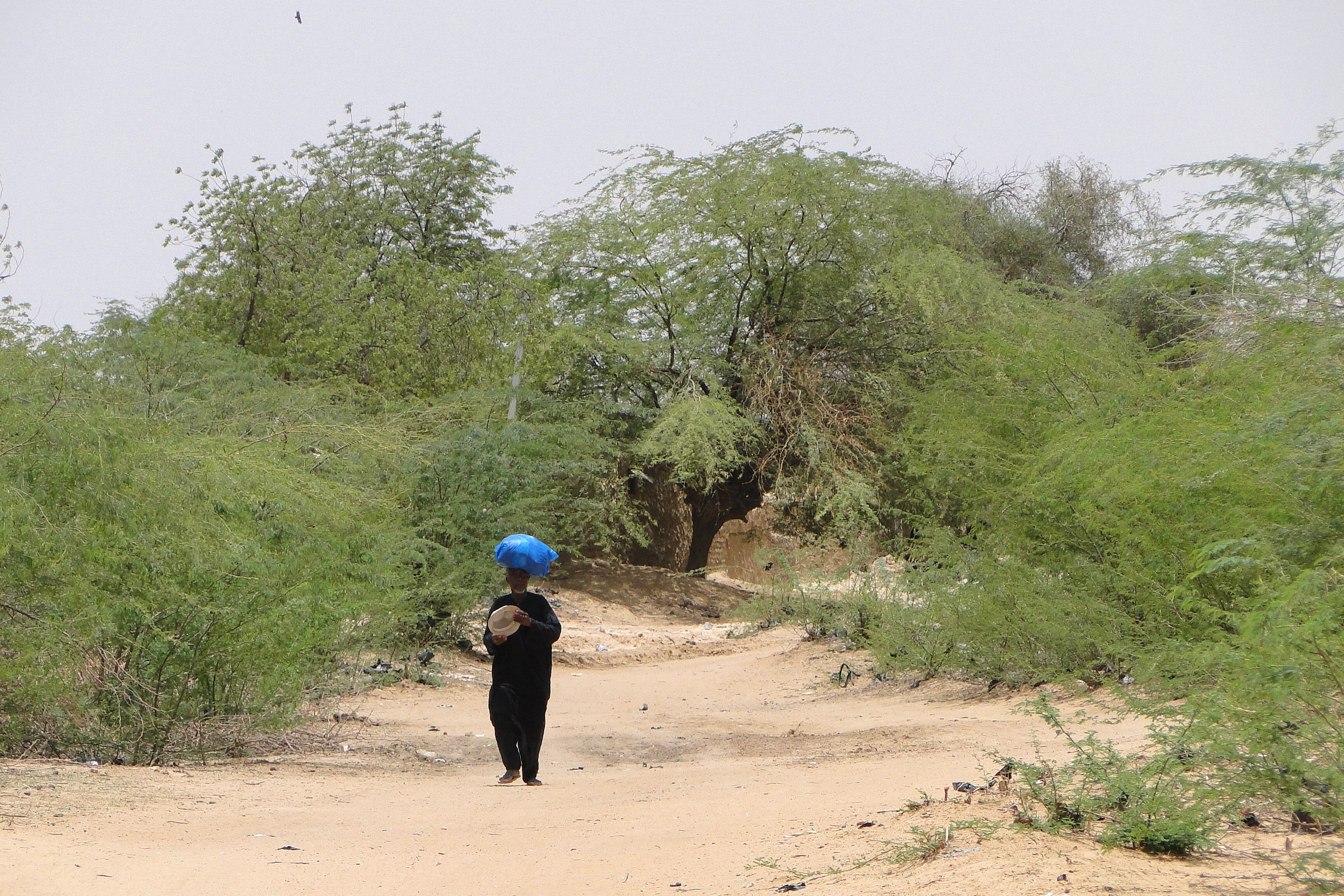
- Throughout the Sahel, rammed earth construction is widespread, as exemplified by this medieval mosque in Burkina Faso. Sahel savanna and its namesake acacias at the beginning of the short summer rainy season

- The Sahel region in Africa: a belt up to 1,000 km (620 mi) wide that spans 5,400 km (3,360 mi) from the Atlantic Ocean to the Red Sea

Ecology
- Realm: Afrotropical
- Biome: Tropical and subtropical grasslands, savannas, and shrublands
- Borders: List: East Saharan montane xeric woodlands; East Sudanian savanna; Ethiopian montane forests; Inner Niger Delta; Lake Chad flooded savanna; South Saharan steppe and woodlands; Sudd flooded grasslands; West Saharan montane xeric woodlands; West Sudanian savanna
- Animals: Camels, horses
- Bird species: Migratory birds
- Mammal species: Oryx, gazelles, African buffalo

Geography
- Area: 3,053,200 km^{2} (1,178,800 mi^{2})
- Countries: List: Algeria; Burkina Faso; Cameroon; Cape Verde; Central African Republic; Chad; Eritrea; The Gambia; Mali; Mauritania; Niger; Nigeria; Senegal; South Sudan; Sudan
- Elevation: 200 and 400 meters (660 and 1,310 ft)
- Rivers: Senegal, Niger, Nile
- Climate type: Tropical savanna climates (Aw), Hot Semi-arid (BSh), Hot Desert (BWh)

The Sahel region (/səˈhɛl/; from Arabic ساحل sāḥil [ˈsaːħil], "coast, shore"), or Sahelian acacia savanna, is a biogeographical region in Africa. It is the transition zone between the more humid Sudanian savannas to its south and the drier Sahara to the north. The Sahel has a hot semi-arid climate and stretches across the southernmost latitudes of North Africa between the Atlantic Ocean and the Red Sea. Although geographically located in the tropics, the Sahel does not have a tropical climate.

The Sahel has one of the world's fastest-growing populations due to its high human birthrate, with approximately 80 million people in 2018. The western Sahel in particular has experienced frequent food and water shortages due to droughts caused by its semi-arid climate, as well as high levels of government corruption. Since the 2010s, various coups, insurgencies, terrorist incidents, and foreign interventions have taken place across the Sahel and Françafrique, leading to the region being called the Coup Belt. As a result, the Sahel is viewed as both an ecoregion and a geopolitical space shaped by internal instability and external strategic competition.

== Etymology ==
The term is borrowed from the Arabic name for the region, الساحل al-sāḥil. Sāḥil literally means "coast, shore", which has been explained as a figurative reference to the southern edge of the vast Sahara.

== Geography ==
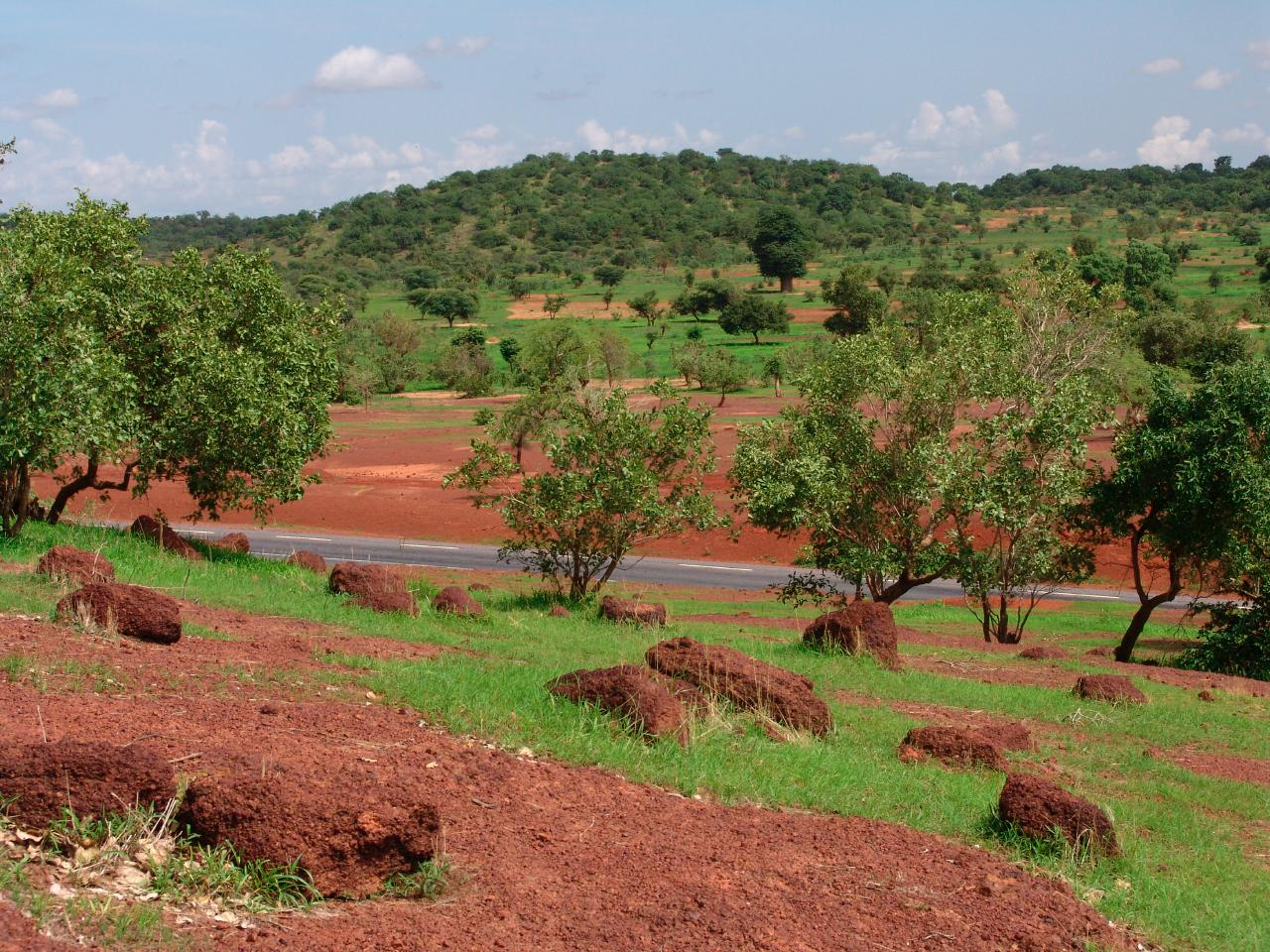
The lush green of the Sahelian acacia savanna during the rainy summer season in Mali. Note the large baobab amongst the acacia.

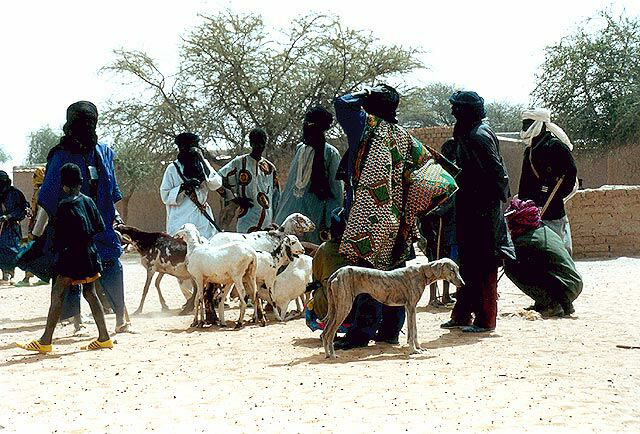
Herders with livestock and azawakh dogs in the Sahel

The Sahel spans 5,900 km (3,670 mi) from the Atlantic Ocean in the west to the Red Sea in the east, in a belt several hundred to a thousand kilometers (c. 600 miles) wide. It covers an area of 3,053,200 square kilometers (1,178,850 sq mi).

Representing a climatic and ecological transition zone with hot semi-desert and steppe conditions, the region borders the more humid Sudanian savannas to its south and the dry Sahara desert to the north. This ecoregion is also called the Sahelian acacia savanna in honour of its most prominent and very drought tolerant genus of tree.

The topography is mainly flat; most of the region lies between 200 and 400 meters (660 and 1,310 ft) in elevation. Isolated plateaus and mountain ranges include the Marrah Mountains, Aïr Mountains, and Ennedi Plateau, which are designated as separate ecoregions because their flora and fauna are distinct from the surrounding lowlands (e.g. East Saharan woodlands). Annual rainfall varies from around 100–200 mm (4–8 in) in the north to around 700–1,000 mm (28–39 in) in the south.

=== Flora and fauna ===
The Sahel is mostly covered in grassland and savanna, with areas of woodland and shrubland. Grass cover is fairly continuous across the region, dominated by annual grass species such as Cenchrus biflorus, Schoenefeldia gracilis and Aristida stipoides. Species of acacia are the dominant trees, with Acacia tortilis as the most common one. In the north, areas of desert shrub, including Panicum turgidum and Aristida sieberiana, alternate with areas of grassland and savanna. During the long dry season, many trees lose their leaves and the predominantly annual grasses die.

The Sahel was formerly home to large populations of grazing mammals, before the larger species were greatly reduced due to over-hunting and competition with livestock. Several species are vulnerable (Dorcas gazelle, cheetah, lion and red-fronted gazelle), endangered (Dama gazelle and African wild dog), or extinct (the Scimitar-horned oryx is probably extinct in the wild, and both Pelorovis and the Bubal hartebeest are extinct).

The seasonal wetlands are important for migratory birds moving within Africa and on the African-Eurasian flyways.

=== Climate ===
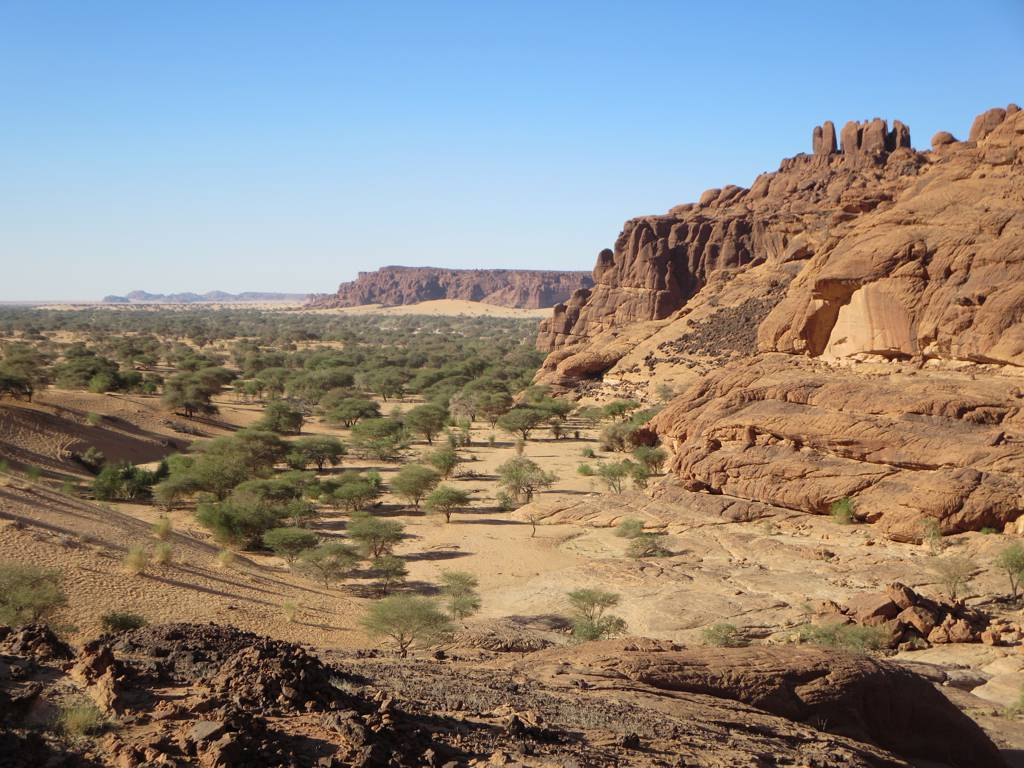
Ennedi Plateau is located at the border of the Sahara and the Sahel

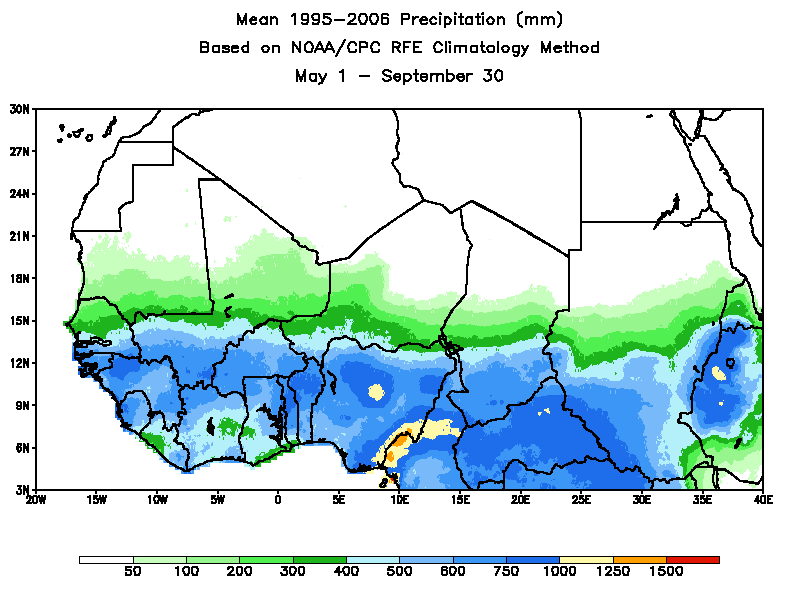
10 year average precipitation during the summer rainy season (May–September) in the Sahel and adjacent regions

The Sahel has a hot semi-arid climate (Köppen climate classification BSh). The climate is typically hot, sunny, dry and somewhat windy all year long. The climate is similar to, but less extreme than, the climate of the Sahara desert located just to the north.

The Sahel receives a low to very low amount of precipitation annually. The steppe has a very long, prevailing dry season and a short rainy season. The precipitation is also extremely irregular and varies considerably from season to season. Most of the rain usually falls during four to six months in the middle of the year, while the other months may remain absolutely dry. The interior generally receives between 200 mm and 700 mm of rain yearly.

A system of subdivisions often adopted for the climate based on annual rainfall is as follows: the Saharan-Sahelian climate, with mean annual precipitation between around 100 and 200 mm (such as Khartoum, Sudan); the strict Sahelian climate, with mean annual precipitation between around 200 and 700 mm (such as Niamey, Niger); and the Sahelian-Sudanese climate, with mean annual precipitation between around 700 and 900 mm (such as Ouagadougou, Burkina Faso).

The relative humidity is low to very low, often between 10% and 25% during the dry season and between 25% and 75% during the rainy season. The least humid places have a relative humidity under 35%. Annual rain levels were measured to fall between 20 and 40% in a span of two decades from 1931 to 1960 and 1968–1990; the levels recovered slightly in the mid-1990s in some areas, especially in central and eastern areas as far as Senegal.

The Sahel is characterized by constant, intense heat, with an unvarying temperature. The Sahel rarely experiences cold temperatures. During the hottest period, the average high temperatures are generally between 36 and 42 °C (97 and 108 °F) (and even more in the hottest regions), often for more than three months, while the average low temperatures are around 25 to 31 °C (77 to 88 °F). During the cooler period, the average high temperatures are between 27 and 33 °C (81 and 91 °F) and the average low temperatures are between 15 and 21 °C (59 and 70 °F). Everywhere in the Sahel, the average mean temperature is over 18 °C (64 °F).

The Sahel has very high sunshine duration year-round, approaching desert levels of between 2,400 hours (about 55% of the daylight hours) and 3,600 hours (more than 80% of the daylight hours). The cloud cover is low. Niamey has 3,082 hours of sunshine; Gao has 3,385 hours; Timbuktu 3,409 hours; and N'Djamena 3,205 hours.

=== Recent droughts ===
For hundreds of years, the Sahel region has experienced frequent droughts and megadroughts. One megadrought lasted 250 years from 1450 to 1700. There was a major drought in 1914, leading to large-scale famine. From 1951 to 2004, the Sahel experienced some of the most consistent and severe droughts in Africa. The 1960s saw a large increase in rainfall in the region, making the northern drier region more accessible. There was a push, supported by governments, for people to move northwards. When the long drought period from 1968 through 1974 began, grazing quickly became unsustainable and large-scale denuding of the terrain followed. Like the drought in 1914, this led to a large-scale famine, but this time somewhat tempered by international visibility and an outpouring of aid. This catastrophe led to the founding of the International Fund for Agricultural Development.

==== 2010 drought ====
Between June and August 2010, famine struck the Sahel. Niger's crops failed to mature in the heat, 350,000 faced starvation, and 1,200,000 were at risk of famine. In Chad the temperature reached 47.6 °C (117.7 °F) on 22 June in Faya-Largeau, breaking a record set in 1961. Niger tied its highest temperature record set in 1998, also on 22 June, at 47.1 °C in Bilma. That record was broken the next day, when Bilma hit 48.2 °C (118.8 °F). The hottest temperature recorded in Sudan was reached on 25 June, at 49.6 °C (121.3 °F) in Dongola, breaking a record set in 1987. Niger reported on 14 July that diarrhoea, starvation, gastroenteritis, malnutrition and respiratory diseases had sickened or killed many children. The military junta appealed for international food aid and took serious steps to call on overseas help. On 26 July, the heat reached near-record levels over Chad and Niger, and in northern Niger about 20 people reportedly died of dehydration by 27 July.

=== Desertification and soil loss ===
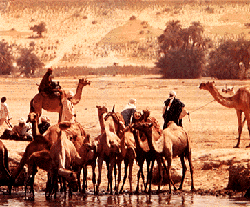
Camels at a watering hole in the semi-arid Sahel in Chad

The Sahel region faces environmental issues that are contributing to global warming. If the change in climate is not slowed down and desertification possibly reversed through sustainable practices and any form of reforestation, it is only a matter of time before countries like Niger lose their entire landmass to desert due to unchecked unsustainable human practices. Over-farming, over-grazing, over-population of marginal lands, and natural soil erosion have caused serious desertification of the region. This has affected shelter construction, making it necessary to change the used materials. The Woodless Construction project was introduced in Sahel in 1980 by the Development Workshop, achieving since then a high social impact in the region. A major initiative to combat desertification in the Sahel region via reforestation and other interventions is the Great Green Wall.

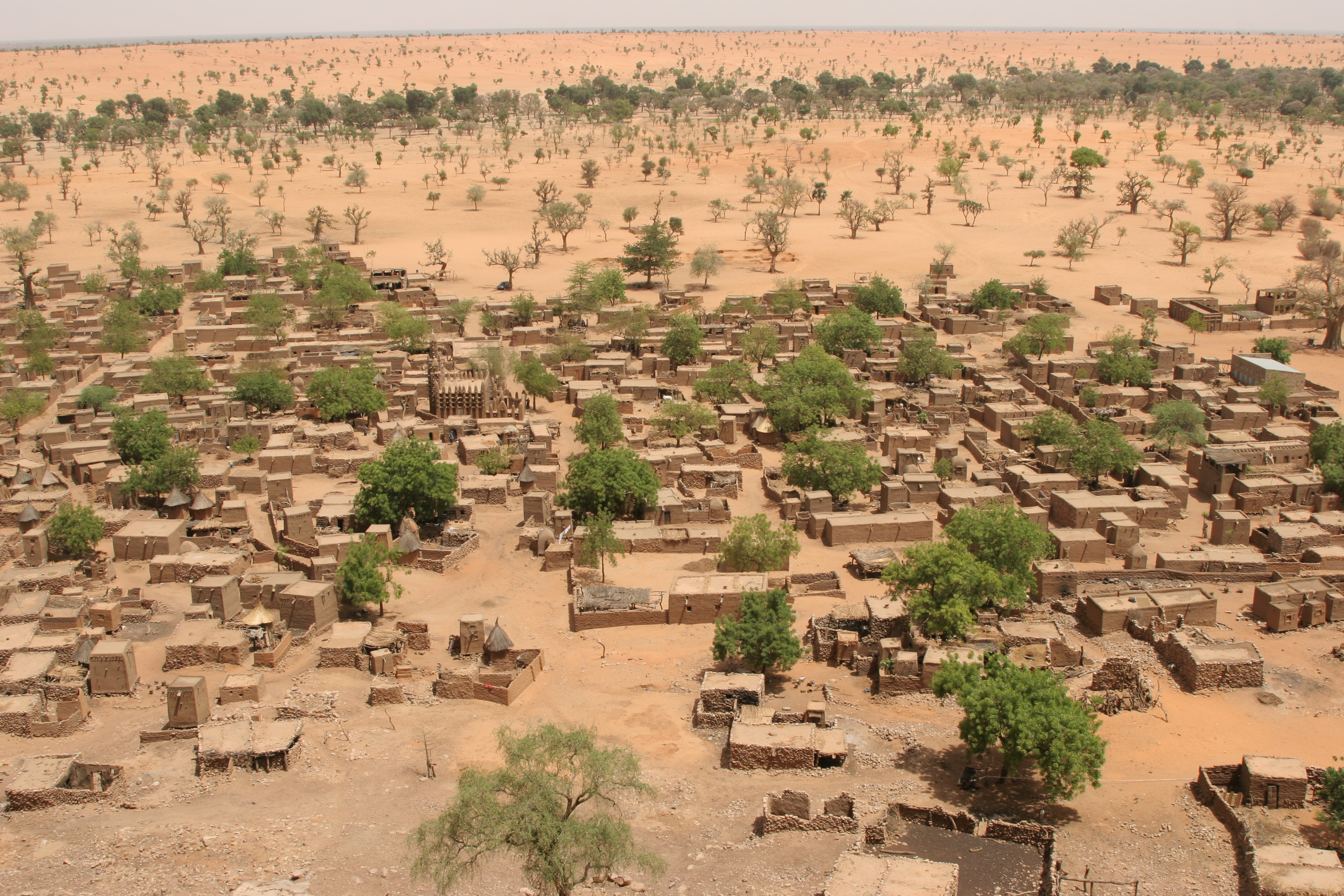
Sahel region of Mali

Major dust storms are a frequent occurrence. During November 2004 several such storms hit Chad, originating in the Bodélé Depression. This is a common area for dust storms, occurring on average on 100 days every year. On 23 March 2010, a major sandstorm hit Mauritania, Senegal, The Gambia, Guinea-Bissau, Guinea, and inland Sierra Leone. Another struck in southern Algeria, inland Mauritania, Mali and northern Ivory Coast at the same time.

Following the drought period of the 1970s and 1980, however, the Sahel began to experience increased rainfall. This may be due to global warming, which can cause stronger monsoons, in turn caused by a warmer Atlantic Ocean. Warming of the Mediterranean Sea may also be a factor. Groundwater levels are also rising, even more than can be accounted for just from the increased rainfall, according to some hydrologists. Other possible contributing factors include the Great Green Wall, the revival of traditional water harvesting methods and the abandonment of irrigation projects.

=== Protected areas ===
Protected areas include Ferlo Nord Wildlife Reserve in Senegal, Sylvo-Pastoral and Partial Faunal Reserve of the Sahel in Burkina Faso, Ansonga-Ménake Faunal Reserve in Mali, Tadres Reserve in Niger, and Waza National Park in Cameroon.

== Culture ==
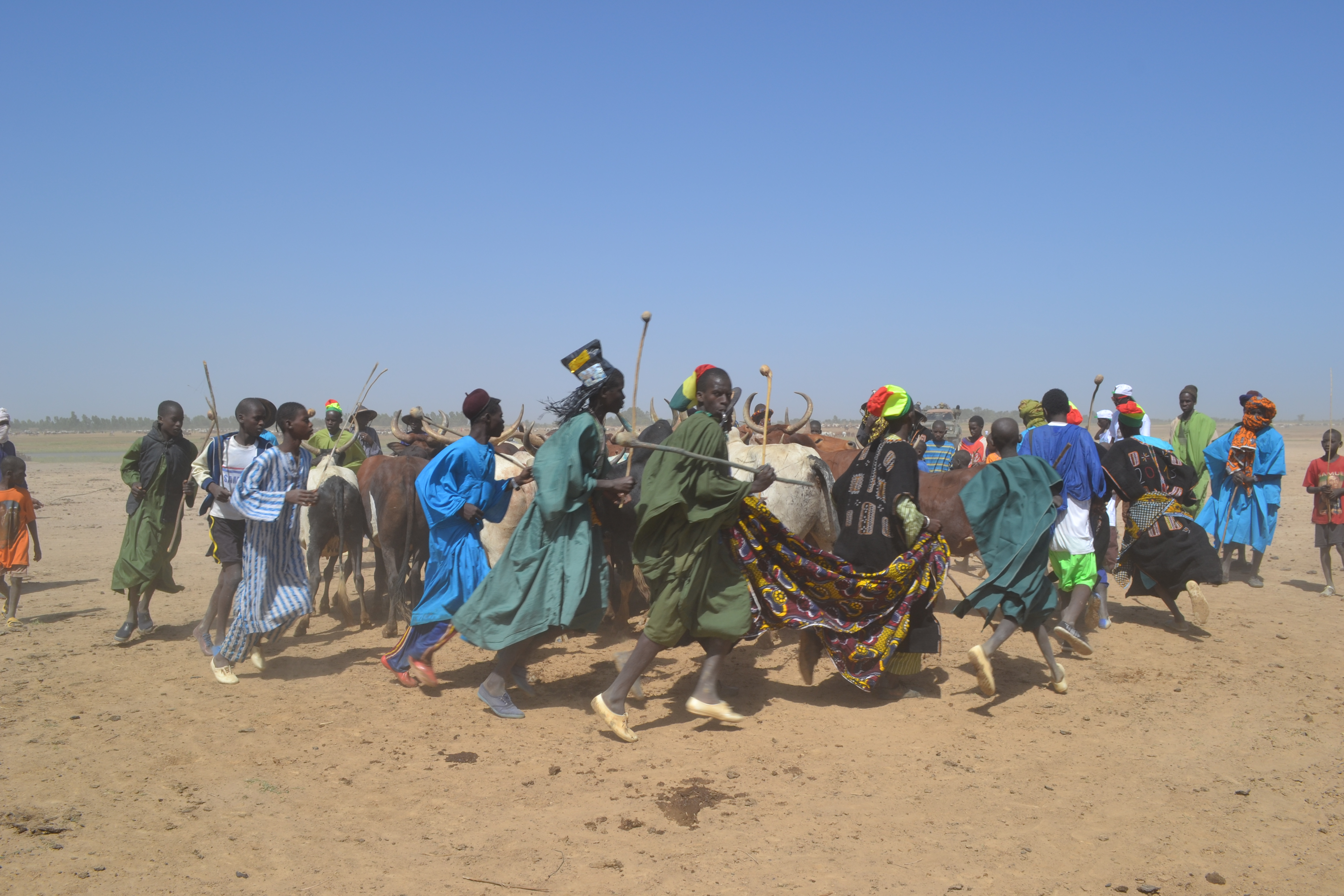
Fulani herders in Mali

Traditionally, most of the people have been semi-nomads, farming and raising livestock in a system of transhumance. The difference between the dry north with higher levels of soil nutrients and the wetter south with more vegetation is exploited by having the herds graze on high-quality feed in the north during the wet season, and trek several hundred kilometers to the south to graze on more abundant but less nutritious feed during the dry period. In the western Sahel, polygamy and child marriage are common. Female genital mutilation is also practiced across the Sahel.

=== Music ===
Blues historians and historians of African-American music, such as Paul Oliver and Samuel Charters, have suggested that the essential elements of the blues originated in the Sahel, brought over by Africans via the slave trade. The slaves brought to South America and the Caribbean were largely from percussion-based musical cultures in southern, coastal West Africa (like southern Nigeria), as well as Central African and Bantu-speaking parts of Africa, whose musical cultures lacked many elements that would become characteristic of the blues. In contrast, many of the slaves brought to North America were from the Sahel region and much more familiar with stringed instruments; the banjo evolved from Sahelian string instruments such as the akonting. Charters found that many Sahelian slaves were from Muslim cultures, favouring stringed, melodic, and solo melismatic singing, which differed from the drum-based music of other African regions, who generally favoured drumming and group chants. These traditions—which were sometimes permitted by plantation owners who feared drums—became tools of rebellion, evolving into blues.

Historian Sylviane Diouf and ethnomusicologist Gerhard Kubik identify Islamic music as an influence on blues music. Diouf notes a striking resemblance between the Islamic call to prayer (originating from Bilal ibn Rabah, a famous Abyssinian African Muslim in the early 7th century) and 19th-century field holler music, noting that both have similar lyrics praising God, melody, note changes, "words that seem to quiver and shake" in the vocal chords, dramatic changes in musical scales, and nasal intonation. She attributes the origins of field holler music to African Muslim slaves who accounted for an estimated 30% of African slaves in America. According to Kubik, "the vocal style of many blues singers using melisma, wavy intonation, and so forth is a heritage of that large region of The Western Sahel that had been in contact with the Islamic world via the Maghreb since the seventh and eighth centuries." There was particularly a significant trans-Saharan cross-fertilization between the musical traditions of the Maghreb and the Sahel.

The blue note—a hallmark of blues music and rhythm and blues characterised by flattened thirds, fifths, or sevenths—has roots in the musical traditions of the Sahel, and so genres descending from blues have a strong Sahelian influence. In contrast, the more percussion-based Afro-Brazilian music and Afro-Cuban music have more of a southern, coastal West African, Central African, and Bantu influence, where the blue note is absent; this originated from non-Muslim slaves, who generally favoured drums and group chants. The griot tradition of the Sahel also may have influenced talking blues, and by extension, hip hop.

=== Ethnic groups ===
Sahel is home to diverse ethnic groups like the Fulani, Tuareg, Hausa, Dogon, Songhai, Mande, Kanuri, and Arabs. Arabs are dominant eastern and western Sahel, notably in Sudan and Mauritania. Many Sahelian tribes have strong historical connections with Arab communities, fostered by trans-Saharan trade routes and the spread of Islam. These ties have influenced language, religion and social customs, creating a unique blend of cultures in the region.

== Language ==
French is spoken widely, as many of its nations are former French colonies, with two adopting French as an official language and many more using it colloquially. French is a remnant of colonial history and a foreign import to a region characterized by linguistic diversity. After establishing French culture in northern Senegal in the mid-19th century, colonial governors like General Louis Faidherbe pushed deeper into the Sahel's interior, facing opposition from regional leaders. Despite resistance, territory was accrued and placed under the control of lieutenant governors who extracted resources and labor from local populations. The greater Sahel was subsequently organized into the massive territory of French West Africa in 1895, noted for its linguistic diversity.

French has been the official language of most Sahel countries at various points in their history, but the trend of removing its official status has gained momentum since the end of French military intervention in the region in 2022. Since then, the governments of Mali, Burkina Faso, and Niger have stripped French from being an official language, punctuating a broader theme of the Sahel's self-isolation from Paris. Although there is evidence of its use in nearly every Sahel country, research suggests that French is more often a lingua franca of business among the elite and educated classes than a conduit of practical everyday dialogue.

West African and Sahel loanwords have entered the lexicon of modern standard French, usually in the context of vernacular or slang elocution. This trend is mostly understood by the wave of African migrants to France since the end of the colonial era, but has intensified since the explosion of the youth population of Africa. Sahel loanwords are challenging the historic rigidity of the French language and its corresponding cultural norms. Code-switching and linguistic blending is common among French speakers in the Sahel, like other regions known for their linguistic diversity. Loanwords and phonetic irregularities derived from local languages have permeated Sahel French:

- Overt influence of English and even Chinese words in Burkinabè French, such as enjoy "take pleasure/enjoy" and chao/mao "old."
- Ligidi is a Mooré loanword meaning "money."
- C' nekh comes from the French expression c'est bon but replaces bon with the Wolof word nekh, meaning "good" or "pleasant."
- The phoneme /y/ is pronounced more closely to /i/ by most French locutors in the Western Sahel.
- The apical trill pronunciation of /r/, once common in metropolitan France, continues in West Africa despite the more common use of the uvular trill pronunciation by standard French speakers.
- Less phonetic variation exists between the vowels /ø/, /ə/, and /e/ among French speakers in Burkina Faso and Niger; /e/ characterizes the majority of these pronunciations.

== History ==
=== Early agriculture ===
Around 4000 BC, the climate of the Sahara and the Sahel started to become drier at an exceedingly fast pace. This climate change caused lakes and rivers to shrink significantly and caused increasing desertification. This in turn decreased the amount of land conducive to settlements and caused migrations of farming communities to the more humid climate of West Africa.

=== Sahelian kingdoms ===
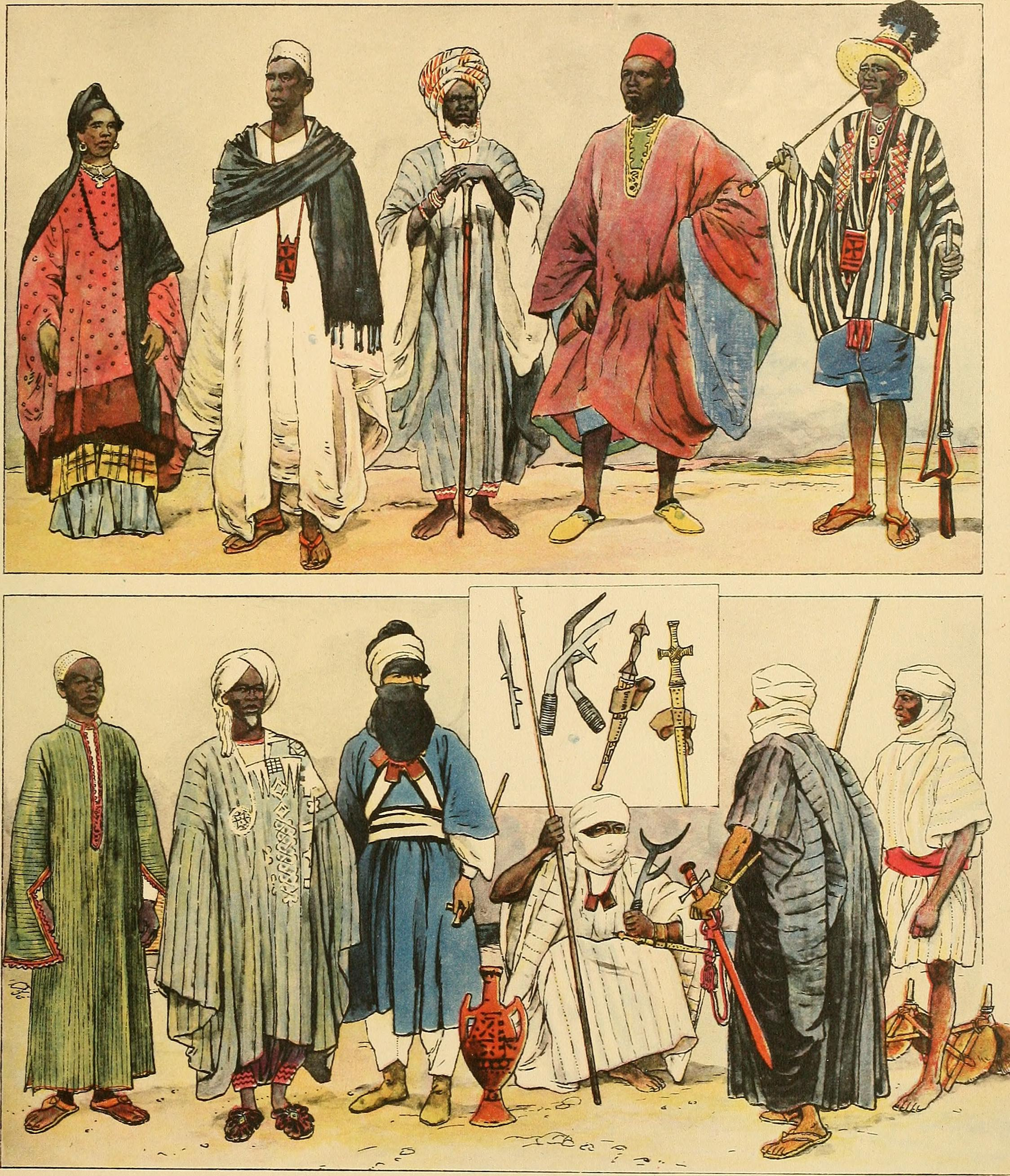
1905 depiction of ethnic groups in the Sahel

The larger Sahelian kingdoms emerged from 750 AD and founded several large cities in the Niger valley region, including Timbuktu, Gao and Djenné.

The kingdom of Alodia was a Christian Nubian Kingdom in the eastern Sahel that reached its zenith from the 9th to 12th century. It was first mentioned in 569, its capital Soba located near modern-day Khartoum. Soba was described as a city of "extensive dwellings and churches full of gold and gardens". With the forest-savanna mosaic to their south, the Sahelian states were hindered from expanding into the north Akan state of the Bono state and Yoruba peoples, as mounted warriors were ineffective in the forests. In addition, the horses and camels were susceptible to the humidity and diseases of the tropics.

=== Colonial period ===
The western Sahel fell to France in the late 19th century as part of French West Africa. Chad was added in 1900 as part of French Equatorial Africa. The French territories in the Sahel were decolonised in 1960. Eastern Sahel did not fall to the European powers but to the Khedivate of Egypt when it was conquered by Muhammad Ali in the 1820s. By 1899 it came under British rule until granted independence at Egypt's behest in 1956.

== Instability and violence ==
=== Terrorism ===
According to The Economist, in recent years the Sahel has become the epicenter of terrorist violence, contributing to 35% of all global deaths from terrorism by 2021, with Jama'at Nasr al-Islam wal Muslimin, an al-Qaeda-affiliated group, identified as the world's fastest-growing terrorist organization. In 2023, fatalities from conflict in the central Sahel rose by 38%, according to data from the research organization Armed Conflict Location and Event Data Project.

In the wake of the Libyan Crisis beginning in 2011, terrorist organizations operating in the Sahel—including Boko Haram, Islamic State and al-Qaeda in the Islamic Maghreb (AQIM)—have greatly exacerbated the violence, extremism and instability of the region. In March 2020, the United States sent a special envoy to combat the rising violence from terrorist groups. The Catholic charity Aid to the Church in Need has highlighted the fact that the Sahel has become one of the most dangerous regions in the world for Christians. As of 2024, a wave of military juntas, favoring Russian mercenaries over Western forces and UN peacekeepers, has intensified violence. This led Mauritania and Chad to disband the G5 Sahel, an anti-terrorism alliance, after the military regimes in Burkina Faso, Niger, and Mali withdrew.

According to the BBC, the Sahel region has become the global epicenter of terrorism, accounting for over half of all terrorism-related deaths, according to the Global Terrorism Index. In 2023, the region recorded 3,885 fatalities out of a global total of 7,555, marking a nearly tenfold increase since 2019. The surge in extremist violence is attributed to the expansion of groups like the Islamic State's affiliate in the Sahel and Jama'at Nusrat al-Islam wal Muslimeen (JNIM), who compete for land and influence while imposing strict sharia-based governance. Political instability, weak governance, and the rise of military juntas following coups in Mali, Burkina Faso, Guinea, and Niger have further fueled the insurgency. These groups sustain their operations through ransom kidnappings, illicit gold mining, and drug trafficking, with the Sahel a major route for cocaine smuggling from South America to Europe. Meanwhile, governments in the region have shifted their alliances from Western nations to Russia and China, relying on paramilitary groups like the Africa Corps for security assistance, though with limited success. The violence is increasingly spilling into neighboring countries such as Togo and Benin, raising concerns about the broader destabilization of West Africa.

=== Human rights issues and political instability ===
In 2020 the United States raised concerns over growing number of allegations of human rights violations and abuses by state security forces in Sahel. The US response came after Human Rights Watch released documents regarding the same. Reports in March 2022 show militants are expanding and spreading out south of the Sahel.

=== Other challenges ===
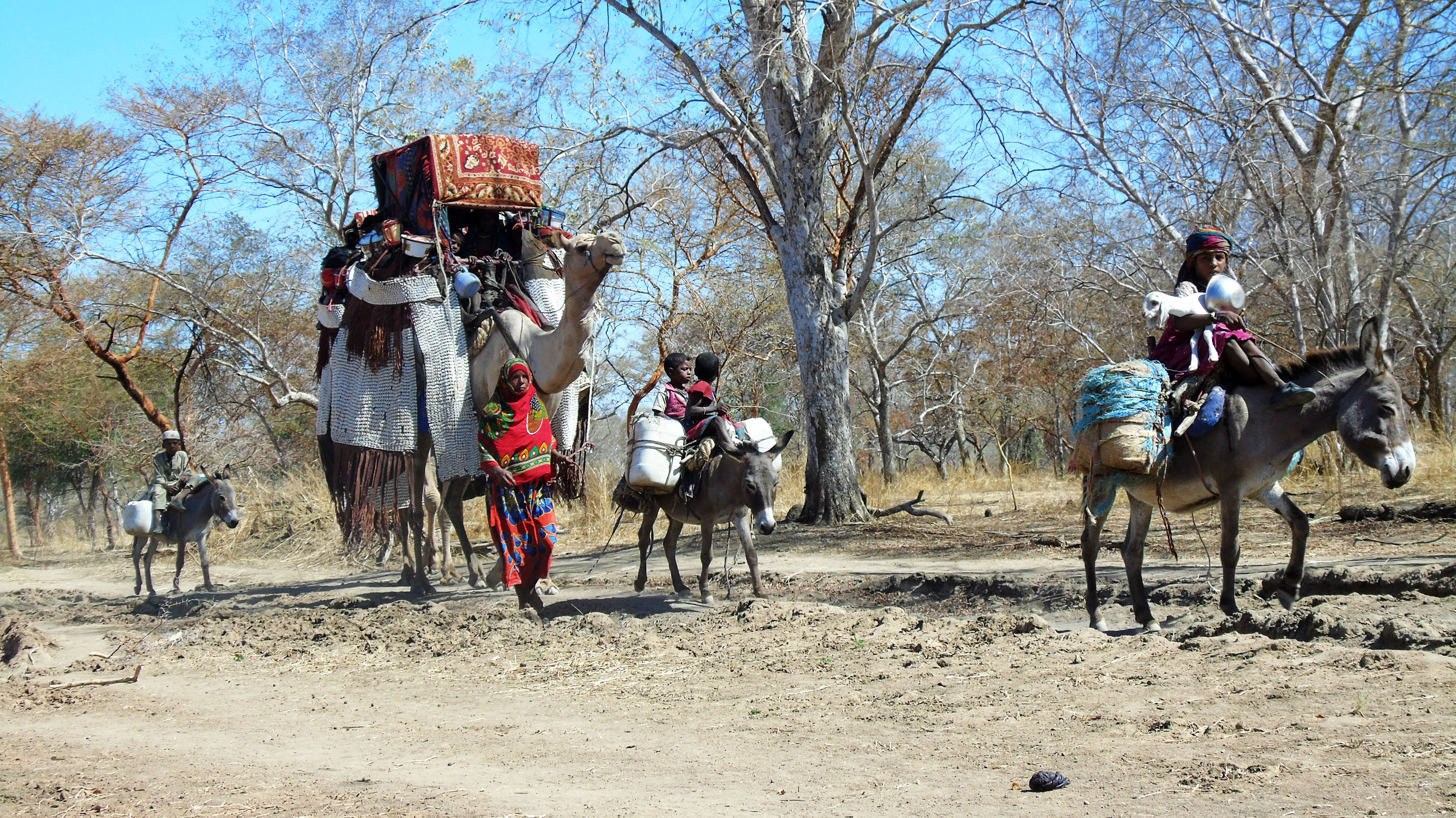
Movement of nomads in Chad

The violent herder–farmer conflicts in Nigeria, Mali, Sudan and other countries in the Sahel have been exacerbated by climate change, land degradation, and rapid population growth. Droughts and food shortages have been linked to the Mali War.

The Sahel is experiencing more severe weather due to climate change, exemplified by the extreme heatwave of March–April 2024 in Burkina Faso and Mali. This event was intensified by a 1.2 °C global temperature increase from human activities.

== See also ==
- 2012 Sahel drought
- Alliance of Sahel States
- Community of Sahel–Saharan States
- Pan Sahel Initiative
- Rainwater harvesting in the Sahel
- Sudan (region)
- Sahara Conservation Fund
- Tipping points in the climate system#Sahel greening
- Trans-Sahelian Highway

== Sources ==
- Azam (ed.), Conflict and Growth in Africa: The Sahel, Organisation for Economic Co-operation and Development (1999), ISBN 92-64-17101-0.
- Lagha CHEGROUCHE, "L'arc géopolitique de l'énergie : le croissant énergétique", in Le Soir d'Algérie, 19/12/2010 (in French)
- Khatim Kherraz; Nabil Ben Khatra (2019). Atlas of Land Cover Maps: Sahel and West Africa (PDF). Carthage, Tunisia: Sahara and Sahel Observatory. ISBN 978-9938-933-19-2.
