= Boulon Forest =

Forest in Burkina Faso

- Interactive map of Boulon Forest
- Location: Burkina Faso

Boulon Forest is a protected forest in Burkina Faso. It is located in Comoé Province.

It is located at an altitude of 313 meters. Boulon Forest is situated south of Sadara.
