= Dida Forest =

- IUCN category IV (habitat/species management area)
- Interactive map of Dida Forest
- Location: Burkina Faso
- Coordinates: 10°00′40″N 4°01′45″W
- Area: km²

Dida Forest is a protected forest in Burkina Faso. It is located in Comoé Province.

The forest is located at 330 meters above sea level.
