= Kourtiagou Reserve =

- IUCN category IV (habitat/species management area)
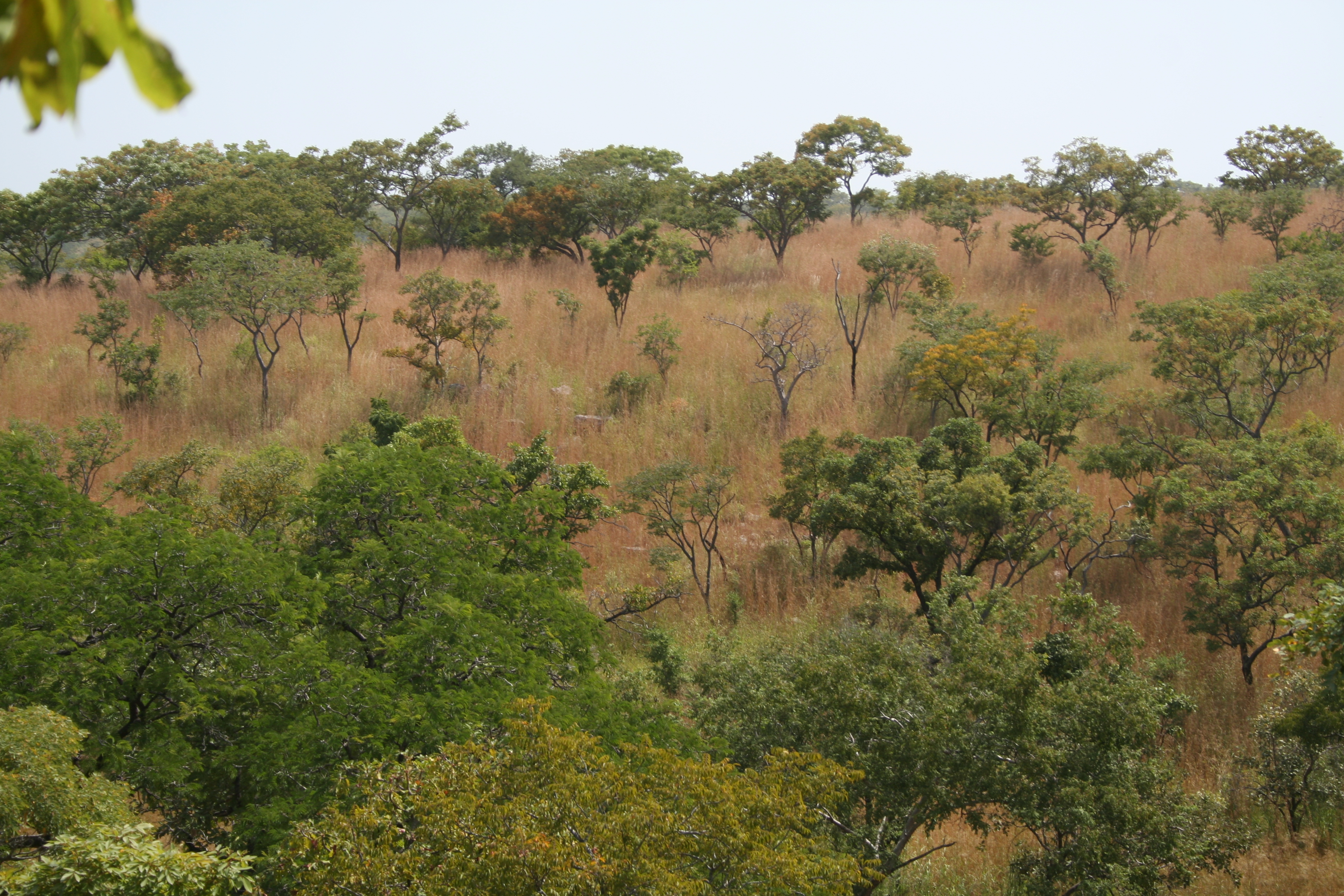
- Tree savannas of the Atacora mountains in the Kourtiagou reserve

- IUCN Protected Areas of the WAP complex: Kourtiagou is central
- Location: (Burkina Faso)
- Coordinates: 11.5236°N 1.94097°E
- Area: 510 km^{2} (200 sq mi)
- Established: 1957

Kourtiagou Reserve is a partial reserve in Burkina Faso. Established in 1957 it is located in Tapoa Province and covers an area of 510 km^{2}. Its name stems from the river Kourtiagou which is the western border of the reserve. In the East it is divided from the W National Park by the road R7 from Tansarga to Banikoara. The southern border is the national border to Benin.
