= Koflandé Forest =

- IUCN category IV (habitat/species management area)
- Location: Burkina Faso
- Area: km^{2}

Koflandé Forest is a protected forest in Burkina Faso. It is located in Comoé Province.

It has an elevation of 274 metres. The Forest of Koflandé is south of Forêt de la Koflandé.
