= West Sudanian savanna =

Tropical savanna ecoregion across Western Africa

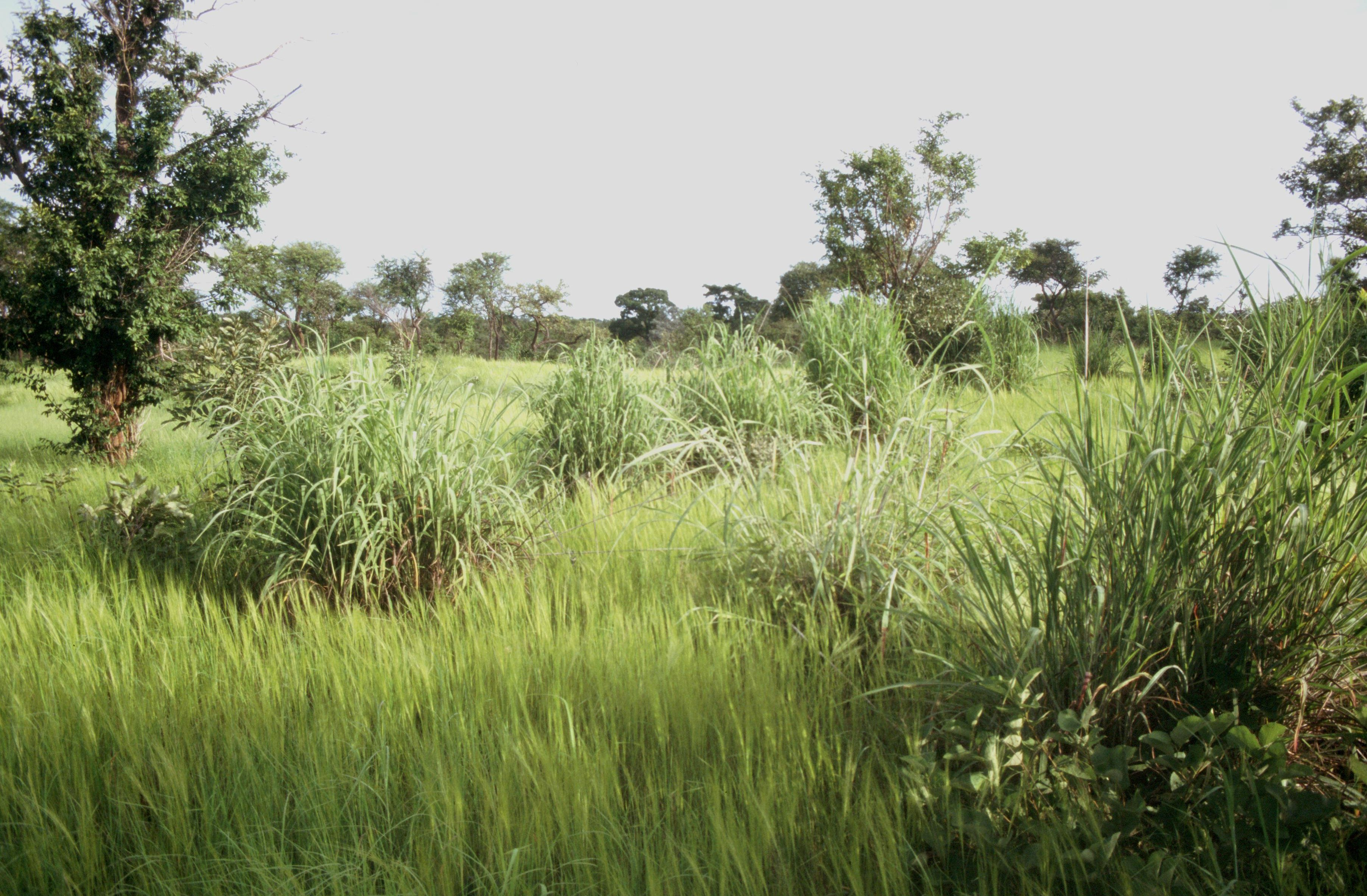
- Sudanian savanna with bunchgrass tufts of Andropogon gayanus, Pama Reserve, Burkina Faso

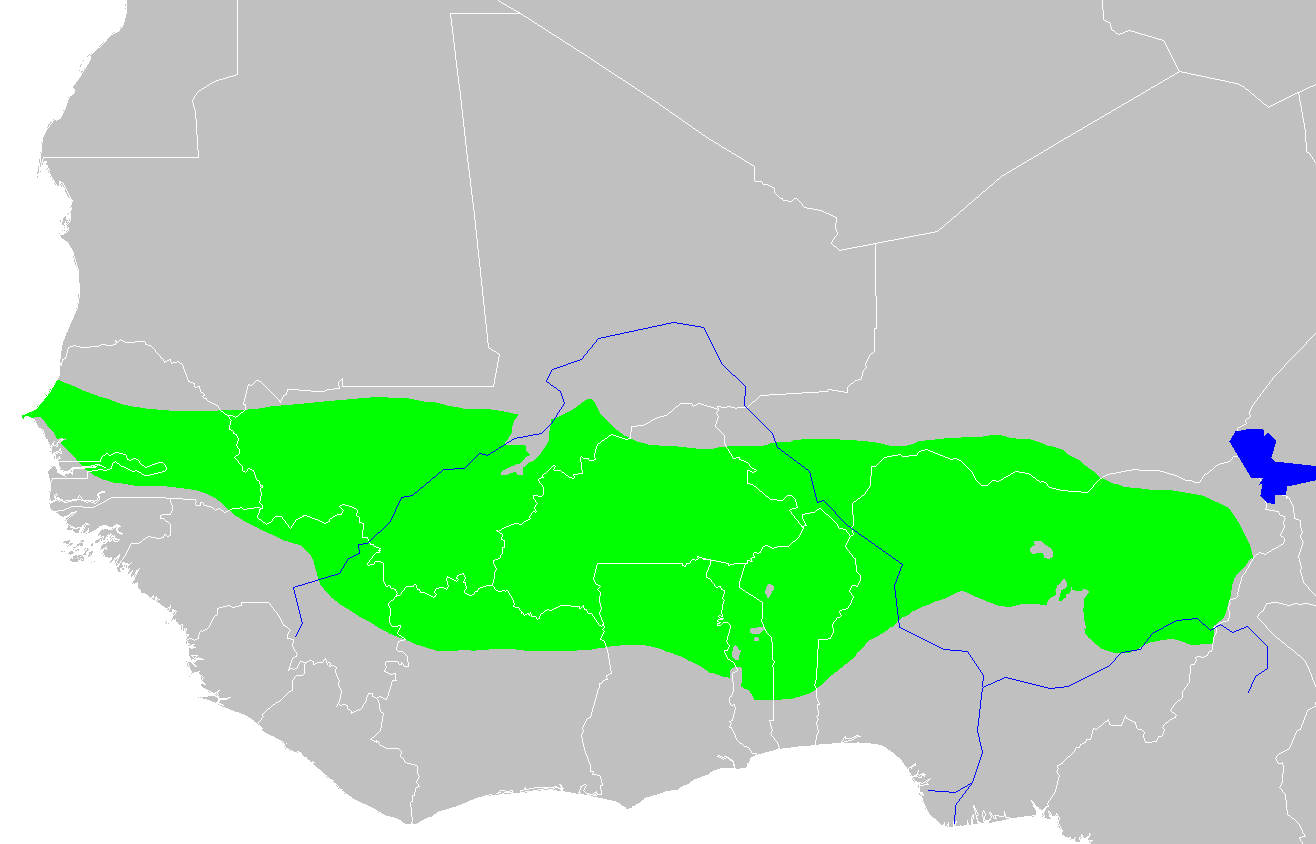
- Map of the West Sudanian savanna ecoregion

Ecology
- Realm: Afrotropical
- Biome: tropical and subtropical grasslands, savannas, and shrublands
- Borders: List: East Sudanian savanna; Eastern Guinean forests; Guinean forest-savanna mosaic; Inner Niger Delta flooded savanna; Jos Plateau forest-grassland mosaic; Lake Chad flooded savanna; Mandara Plateau mosaic; Sahelian Acacia savanna

Geography
- Area: 1,632,821 km^{2} (630,436 mi^{2})
- Countries: List: Benin; Burkina Faso; Gambia; Ghana; Guinea; Ivory Coast; Mali; Niger; Nigeria; Senegal; Togo

Conservation
- Conservation status: Critical/endangered
- Protected: 233,942 km^{2} (14%)

The West Sudanian savanna is a tropical savanna ecoregion that extends across West Africa.

== Geography ==
The ecoregion stretches east and west across West Africa, from the Atlantic coast of Senegal to the Mandara Mountains on Nigeria's eastern border.

The drier Sahelian Acacia savanna lies to the north, and the more humid Guinean forest-savanna mosaic lies to the south.

== Climate ==
The climate is a tropical savanna climate and a hot semi-arid climate (Köppen climate classification Aw and BSh) with a dry season and a wet season and the temperature being warm and hot year-round. Annual rainfall ranges from 1000 mm in the south to 600 mm in the north on the edge of the Sahel. Rainfall and temperature vary seasonally, with a hot rainy season from May to September, and a cooler dry season from October to April. Temperatures range from 30 °C to 33 °C during the hottest month, and 18 °C to 21 °C during the coolest month.

=== Examples ===
Climate data for Dakar, Senegal (1981–2010)
Month	Jan	Feb	Mar	Apr	May	Jun	Jul	Aug	Sep	Oct	Nov	Dec	Year
Record high °C (°F)	39.6 (103.3)	38.7 (101.7)	40.4 (104.7)	38.4 (101.1)	36.2 (97.2)	36.6 (97.9)	36.9 (98.4)	35.0 (95.0)	36.2 (97.2)	39.3 (102.7)	40.3 (104.5)	39.5 (103.1)	40.4 (104.7)
Mean daily maximum °C (°F)	25.3 (77.5)	25.2 (77.4)	25.4 (77.7)	25.0 (77.0)	26.0 (78.8)	28.6 (83.5)	30.0 (86.0)	30.3 (86.5)	30.7 (87.3)	31.0 (87.8)	29.8 (85.6)	27.4 (81.3)	27.9 (82.2)
Mean daily minimum °C (°F)	18.3 (64.9)	18.0 (64.4)	18.5 (65.3)	19.2 (66.6)	20.7 (69.3)	23.5 (74.3)	25.1 (77.2)	25.3 (77.5)	25.2 (77.4)	25.3 (77.5)	23.3 (73.9)	21.0 (69.8)	22.0 (71.6)
Record low °C (°F)	11.0 (51.8)	10.7 (51.3)	10.9 (51.6)	14.0 (57.2)	15.4 (59.7)	17.0 (62.6)	17.2 (63.0)	20.0 (68.0)	20.0 (68.0)	17.2 (63.0)	17.0 (62.6)	12.4 (54.3)	10.7 (51.3)
Average rainfall mm (inches)	1.0 (0.04)	2.0 (0.08)	0.3 (0.01)	0.0 (0.0)	0.1 (0.00)	14.0 (0.55)	51.0 (2.01)	154.0 (6.06)	133.0 (5.24)	26.0 (1.02)	9.2 (0.36)	1.0 (0.04)	391.6 (15.41)
Average rainy days	1.0	1.0	1.0	0.2	0.4	3.0	8.0	15.0	12.0	4.0	1.0	1.0	47.6
Average relative humidity (%)	68	74	77	81	81	80	78	81	83	80	72	68	77
Mean monthly sunshine hours	244.9	245.8	276.0	288.0	291.4	252.0	232.5	223.2	219.0	257.3	249.0	238.7	3,017.8
Percentage possible sunshine	70	74	74	74	73	65	58	57	60	70	73	69	68
Source 1: Pogoda.ru.net
Source 2: Spiegel Online Wetter

Climate data for Bamako (1950–2000, extremes 1949–2015)
Month	Jan	Feb	Mar	Apr	May	Jun	Jul	Aug	Sep	Oct	Nov	Dec	Year
Record high °C (°F)	38.9 (102.0)	42.8 (109.0)	43.9 (111.0)	43.5 (110.3)	45.0 (113.0)	42.0 (107.6)	40.0 (104.0)	37.8 (100.0)	38.4 (101.1)	38.9 (102.0)	42.0 (107.6)	40.0 (104.0)	45.0 (113.0)
Mean daily maximum °C (°F)	33.4 (92.1)	36.4 (97.5)	38.5 (101.3)	39.6 (103.3)	38.5 (101.3)	35.3 (95.5)	32.1 (89.8)	31.1 (88.0)	32.2 (90.0)	34.6 (94.3)	35.3 (95.5)	33.4 (92.1)	35.0 (95.0)
Mean daily minimum °C (°F)	17.0 (62.6)	19.9 (67.8)	22.9 (73.2)	25.2 (77.4)	25.4 (77.7)	23.6 (74.5)	22.2 (72.0)	21.8 (71.2)	21.6 (70.9)	21.3 (70.3)	18.4 (65.1)	16.8 (62.2)	21.3 (70.3)
Record low °C (°F)	8.7 (47.7)	9.0 (48.2)	12.0 (53.6)	15.8 (60.4)	17.8 (64.0)	16.1 (61.0)	17.5 (63.5)	17.2 (63.0)	18.0 (64.4)	14.7 (58.5)	10.8 (51.4)	6.0 (42.8)	6.0 (42.8)
Average rainfall mm (inches)	0.6 (0.02)	0.7 (0.03)	2.1 (0.08)	19.7 (0.78)	54.1 (2.13)	132.1 (5.20)	224.1 (8.82)	290.2 (11.43)	195.9 (7.71)	66.1 (2.60)	5.2 (0.20)	0.5 (0.02)	991.3 (39.03)
Average rainy days (≥ 0.1 mm)	0.2	0.2	0.6	3.3	6.3	7.7	16.7	17.9	14.7	5.7	0.3	0.1	73.7
Average relative humidity (%)	24	20	22	33	50	67	77	81	78	65	38	27	49
Mean monthly sunshine hours	277.4	253.0	268.1	230.4	242.6	233.6	216.6	218.3	221.7	253.7	270.7	268.6	2,954.7
Source 1: World Meteorological Organization
Source 2: NOAA (sun 1961–1990), Deutscher Wetterdienst (extremes and humidity)

Climate data for Ouagadougou (1971-2000, extremes 1902-present)
Month	Jan	Feb	Mar	Apr	May	Jun	Jul	Aug	Sep	Oct	Nov	Dec	Year
Record high °C (°F)	39.8 (103.6)	42.3 (108.1)	43.8 (110.8)	46.1 (115.0)	44.5 (112.1)	41.3 (106.3)	38.8 (101.8)	36.6 (97.9)	38.6 (101.5)	41.0 (105.8)	40.5 (104.9)	40.1 (104.2)	46.1 (115.0)
Mean daily maximum °C (°F)	32.9 (91.2)	35.8 (96.4)	38.3 (100.9)	39.3 (102.7)	37.7 (99.9)	34.7 (94.5)	32.1 (89.8)	31.1 (88.0)	32.5 (90.5)	35.6 (96.1)	35.9 (96.6)	33.4 (92.1)	34.9 (94.8)
Mean daily minimum °C (°F)	16.5 (61.7)	19.1 (66.4)	23.5 (74.3)	26.4 (79.5)	26.1 (79.0)	24.1 (75.4)	22.8 (73.0)	22.2 (72.0)	22.4 (72.3)	23.0 (73.4)	19.6 (67.3)	16.9 (62.4)	21.9 (71.4)
Record low °C (°F)	8.5 (47.3)	10.4 (50.7)	14.8 (58.6)	16.2 (61.2)	17.0 (62.6)	17.0 (62.6)	15.0 (59.0)	17.9 (64.2)	17.6 (63.7)	17.6 (63.7)	13.0 (55.4)	9.5 (49.1)	8.5 (47.3)
Average rainfall mm (inches)	0.1 (0.00)	0.5 (0.02)	5.9 (0.23)	26.5 (1.04)	66.8 (2.63)	97.5 (3.84)	176.2 (6.94)	214.2 (8.43)	121.2 (4.77)	33.5 (1.32)	1.2 (0.05)	0.2 (0.01)	743.8 (29.28)
Average rainy days (≥ 0.1 mm)	0	0	1	3	8	10	14	16	11	5	0	0	68
Average relative humidity (%)	24	21	22	36	50	64	72	80	77	60	38	29	48
Mean monthly sunshine hours	287	263	264	256	277	264	240	223	217	273	288	284	3,136
Source 1: World Meteorological Organization, Meteo Climat (record highs and lows)
Source 2: Deutscher Wetterdienst (humidity, 1961–1967, and sun, 1961–1990) (Note: Station ID for Ouagadougou is 65503 Use this station ID to locate the sunshine duration)

Climate data for Niamey, Niger (1961–1990, extremes: 1961–2015)
Month	Jan	Feb	Mar	Apr	May	Jun	Jul	Aug	Sep	Oct	Nov	Dec	Year
Record high °C (°F)	38.2 (100.8)	44.0 (111.2)	45.0 (113.0)	45.6 (114.1)	45.1 (113.2)	43.5 (110.3)	41.0 (105.8)	39.6 (103.3)	41.8 (107.2)	41.2 (106.2)	40.7 (105.3)	40.0 (104.0)	45.6 (114.1)
Mean daily maximum °C (°F)	32.5 (90.5)	35.7 (96.3)	39.1 (102.4)	40.9 (105.6)	40.2 (104.4)	37.2 (99.0)	34.0 (93.2)	33.0 (91.4)	34.4 (93.9)	37.8 (100.0)	36.2 (97.2)	33.3 (91.9)	36.2 (97.2)
Daily mean °C (°F)	24.3 (75.7)	27.3 (81.1)	30.9 (87.6)	33.8 (92.8)	34.0 (93.2)	31.5 (88.7)	29.0 (84.2)	27.9 (82.2)	29.0 (84.2)	30.8 (87.4)	27.9 (82.2)	25.0 (77.0)	29.3 (84.7)
Mean daily minimum °C (°F)	16.1 (61.0)	19.0 (66.2)	22.9 (73.2)	26.5 (79.7)	27.7 (81.9)	25.7 (78.3)	24.1 (75.4)	23.2 (73.8)	23.6 (74.5)	24.2 (75.6)	19.5 (67.1)	16.7 (62.1)	22.4 (72.3)
Record low °C (°F)	12.6 (54.7)	14.3 (57.7)	18.0 (64.4)	21.6 (70.9)	22.6 (72.7)	20.5 (68.9)	20.0 (68.0)	20.2 (68.4)	20.3 (68.5)	15.8 (60.4)	13.0 (55.4)	12.6 (54.7)	12.6 (54.7)
Average precipitation mm (inches)	0.0 (0.0)	0.0 (0.0)	3.9 (0.15)	5.7 (0.22)	34.7 (1.37)	68.8 (2.71)	154.3 (6.07)	170.8 (6.72)	92.2 (3.63)	9.7 (0.38)	0.7 (0.03)	0.0 (0.0)	540.8 (21.28)
Average precipitation days (≥ 1.0 mm)	0.0	0.0	0.2	0.8	2.9	5.9	9.9	12.2	7.4	1.6	0.1	0.0	41
Average relative humidity (%)	22	17	18	27	42	55	67	74	73	53	34	27	42
Mean monthly sunshine hours	280	264	264	251	257	251	238	203	228	285	285	276	3,082
Source 1: Deutscher Wetterdienst
Source 2: Danish Meteorological Institute

Climate data for Maiduguri
Month	Jan	Feb	Mar	Apr	May	Jun	Jul	Aug	Sep	Oct	Nov	Dec	Year
Record high °C (°F)	40 (104)	42 (108)	44 (111)	46 (115)	47 (117)	42 (108)	43 (109)	36 (97)	38 (100)	39 (102)	39 (102)	38 (100)	47 (117)
Mean daily maximum °C (°F)	31.9 (89.4)	34.6 (94.3)	37.8 (100.0)	40.1 (104.2)	39.4 (102.9)	36.4 (97.5)	33.2 (91.8)	32.0 (89.6)	33.7 (92.7)	36.4 (97.5)	34.2 (93.6)	32.3 (90.1)	35.2 (95.4)
Daily mean °C (°F)	21.8 (71.2)	24.8 (76.6)	29.3 (84.7)	32.6 (90.7)	32.5 (90.5)	30.2 (86.4)	27.5 (81.5)	26.6 (79.9)	27.2 (81.0)	27.9 (82.2)	24.9 (76.8)	23.2 (73.8)	27.4 (81.3)
Mean daily minimum °C (°F)	12.6 (54.7)	15.3 (59.5)	19.7 (67.5)	21.9 (71.4)	25.5 (77.9)	24.5 (76.1)	22.9 (73.2)	22.3 (72.1)	22.4 (72.3)	20.7 (69.3)	16.0 (60.8)	13.1 (55.6)	19.9 (67.8)
Record low °C (°F)	8 (46)	10 (50)	15 (59)	12 (54)	18 (64)	19 (66)	20 (68)	19 (66)	20 (68)	15 (59)	10 (50)	5 (41)	5 (41)
Average precipitation mm (inches)	0.0 (0.0)	0.0 (0.0)	0.3 (0.01)	13.0 (0.51)	30.5 (1.20)	73.8 (2.91)	147.1 (5.79)	193.2 (7.61)	83.0 (3.27)	11.1 (0.44)	0.0 (0.0)	0.1 (0.00)	552.1 (21.74)
Average precipitation days (≥ 1.0 mm)	0.0	0.0	0.5	1.6	4.0	7.0	10.7	10.7	6.8	1.4	0.0	0.0	42.7
Average relative humidity (%) (at 15:00 LST)	15.4	11.2	12.0	17.5	28.4	38.4	55.5	63.4	54.8	30.2	19.0	19.6	30.2
Mean monthly sunshine hours	266.6	249.2	257.3	237.0	263.5	249.0	217.0	204.6	225.0	285.2	282.0	275.9	3,012.3
Mean daily sunshine hours	8.6	8.9	8.3	7.9	8.5	8.3	7.0	6.6	7.5	9.2	9.4	8.9	8.3
Source 1: NOAA, Climate Charts (latitude: 11°51'N; longitude: 013°05'E; elevation: 354m, 1161')
Source 2: Voodoo Skies for record temperatures

== Flora ==
Flora

Savanna and open woodland are the characteristic vegetation types. Species of Combretum and Terminalia are the typical savanna trees, and the ground is covered with long grasses, herbs, and shrubs. Species of Hyparrhenia, or elephant grass, is the predominant grass, and often grows 1 meter or more in height. Trees in the drier woodlands generally less than 10 meters high, and include Anogeissus spp. with Acacia spp., Balanites aegyptiaca, Combretum glutinosum, Commiphora africana, Prosopis africana, Tamarindus indica, and Ziziphus mucronata. Many trees lose their leaves during the height of the dry season, and the grasses often dry out.

Acacia is less common in the wetter woodlands in higher-rainfall areas and along watercourses, where Afzelia africana, Burkea africana, Combretum spp. and Terminalia spp. are predominant. Smaller areas of Isoberlinia woodland occur in more humid portions of the southern ecoregion.

== Fauna ==
The ecoregion is home to many large mammals, including African bush elephant (Loxodonta africana), West African giraffe (Giraffa camelopardalis peralta), giant eland (Taurotragus derbianus derbianus), roan antelope (Hippotragus equinus), African buffalo (Syncerus caffer brachyceros), lion (Panthera leo), leopard (Panthera pardus) cheetah (Acinonyx jubatus), and African wild dog (Lycaon pictus). Most large mammals are now very limited in range and numbers.

== Conservation ==
A 2017 assessment found that 233,942 km^{2}, or 14%, of the ecoregion is in protected areas.
