= Kaboré Tambi National Park =

National park in Burkina Faso

- IUCN category II (national park)
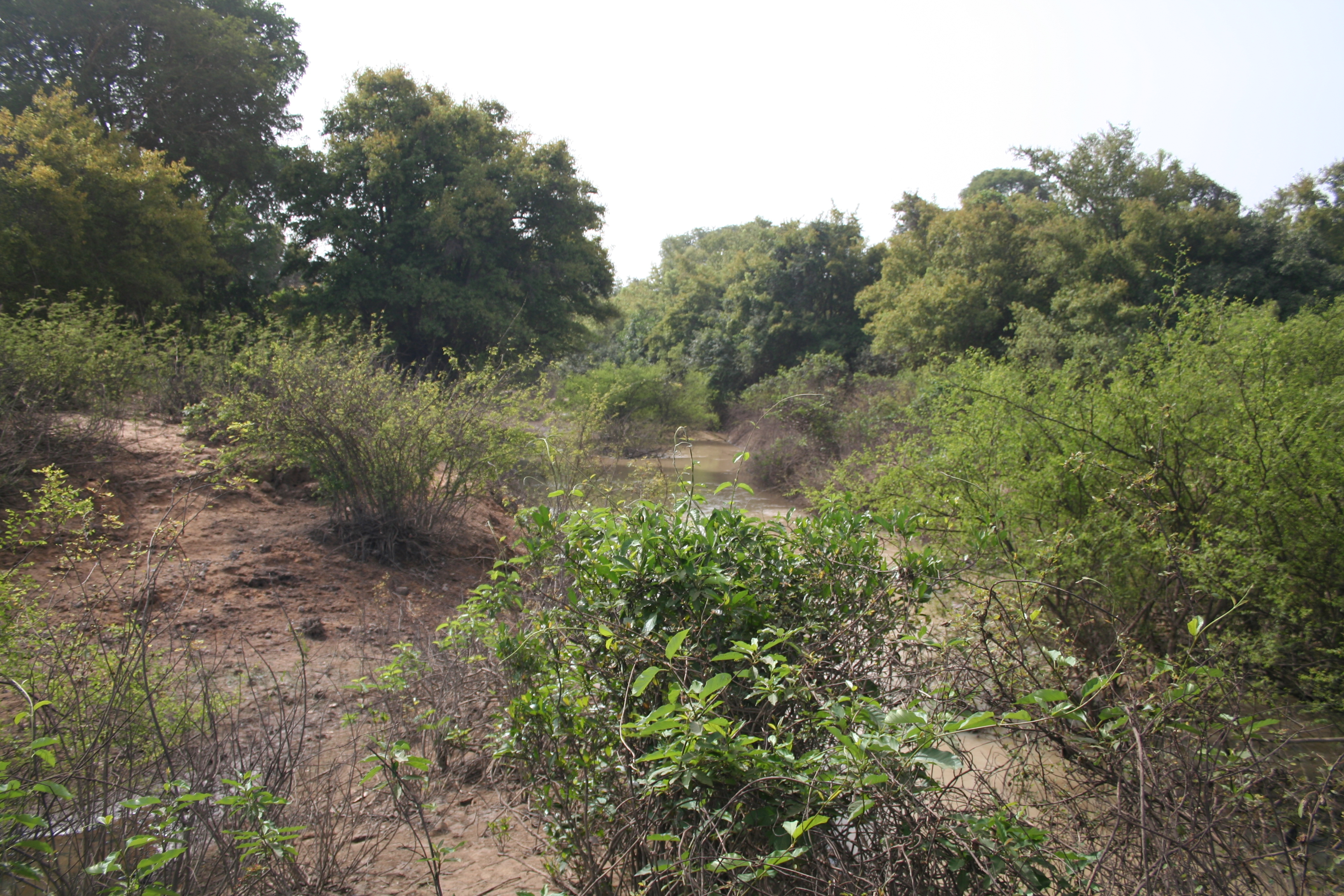
- View of the Red Volta in Kaboré Tambi National Park

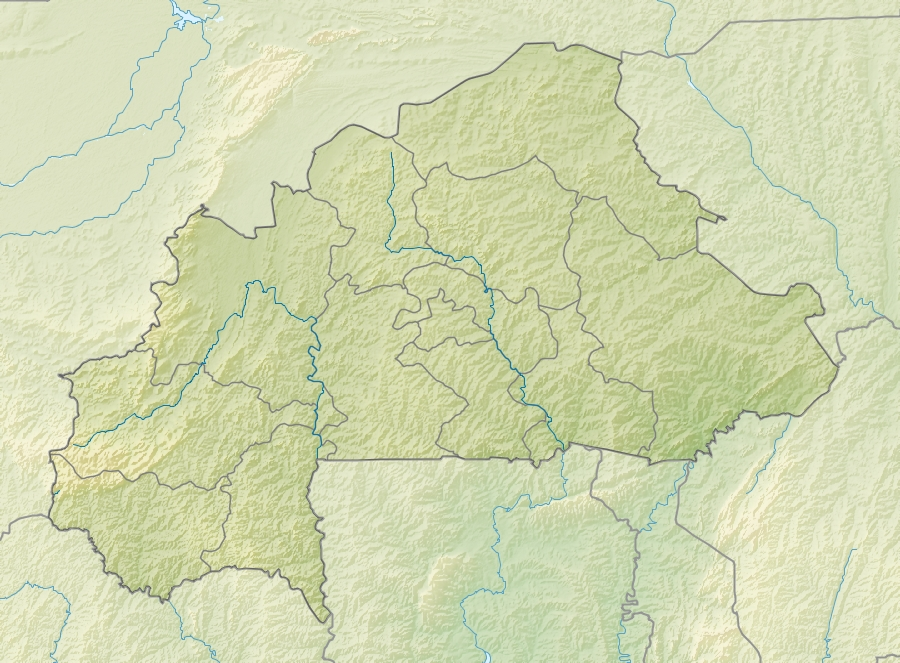
- Location within Burkina Faso
- Location: Burkina Faso
- Nearest city: Pô
- Coordinates: 11.45°N 1.4167°W
- Area: 1,555 km^{2} (600 sq mi)
- Established: 1976

Kaboré Tambi National Park is a national park in Burkina Faso. It is situated between Ouagadougou and the border with Ghana and follows the course of the Nazinon river. Founded in 1976 as Pô National Park, it has been renamed in honor of a park ranger who was killed by poachers in 1991.

The vegetation in the park is mainly distributed in northern Sudan savanna grassland for the north and in the south, a blend of the southern Sudan savanna and northern Guinea savanna.

The park is an important birding area in Burkina Faso with bird species like the Senegal parrot, Violet turaco, Yellow-billed shrike, Blue Blair roller, Yellow penduline tit, pipes, Bearded barbet, Pied-winged swallow, Senegal eremomela, Blackcap babbler, Sun lark, Purple starling, Lavender waxbill, Chestnut-crowned sparrow-weaver, Brown-rumped bunting, and many others.
