= Dibon Forest =

Protected forest in Burkina Faso

- IUCN category IV (habitat/species management area)
- Location: Burkina Faso
- Area: km^{2}

Dibon Forest is a protected forest in Burkina Faso. It is located in Tuy Province.

This protected reserve is located at an altitude of about 254 meters.
