= Nakéré Reserve =

Partial reserve in Burkina Faso

- IUCN category IV (habitat/species management area)
- Location: (Burkina Faso)
- Area: 365 km^{2} (141 sq mi)
- Established: 9 April 1957

Nakéré Reserve is a partial reserve in Burkina Faso. Established in 1957, it is located in Bougouriba Province and covers an area of 365 square kilometres (141 mi^{2}).
