= Mou Forest =

Forest reserve in Burkina Faso

- IUCN category IV (habitat/species management area)
- Location: Burkina Faso
- Area: 340 square kilometres (130 mi^{2})
- Established: 20 October 1938

Mou Forest is a protected forest in Burkina Faso, created in 1938. It is located in Tuy Province and has an area of 340 square kilometres (130 mi^{2}).
