= Pâ Forest =

Forest in Burkina Faso

- IUCN category IV (habitat/species management area)
- Location: Burkina Faso
- Area: 110 km^{2} (42 sq mi)

Pâ Forest is a protected forest in Burkina Faso. It has an area of 11,000 hectares (110 km^{2}). It is located in Balé Province.
