= Madjoari Reserve =

Protected area in Burkina Faso

- IUCN category IV (habitat/species management area)
- Location: (Burkina Faso)
- Area: 170 km^{2} (66 sq mi)
- Established: 1970

Madjoari Reserve is one of the four complete reserves in Burkina Faso. Established in 1970, it is located in Tapoa Province and covers an area of 170 square kilometres (66 mi^{2}).
