= Sylvo-Pastoral and Partial Faunal Reserve of the Sahel =

Protected area in Burkina Faso

- IUCN category IV (habitat/species management area)
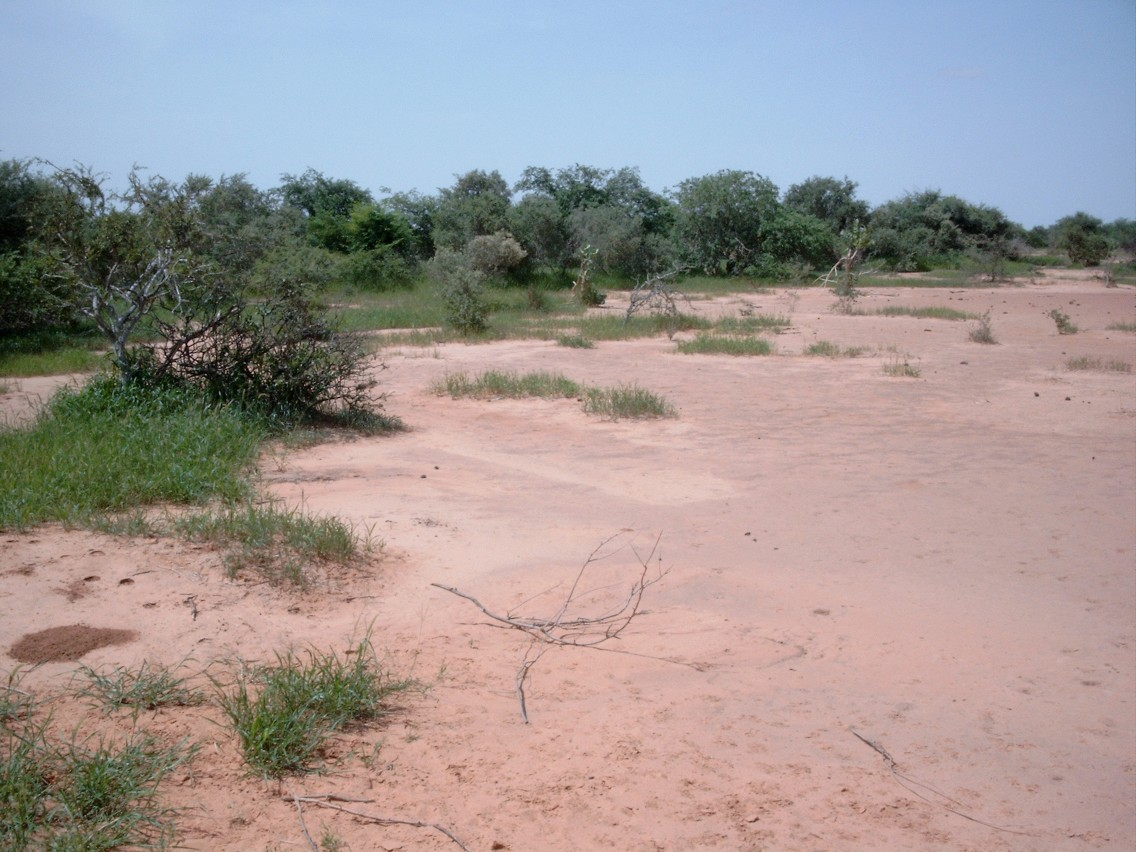
- Tiger bush in the northern part of the reserve.
- Interactive map of Sylvo-Pastoral and Partial Faunal Reserve of the Sahel
- Location: Burkina Faso
- Nearest city: Gorom-Gorom
- Coordinates: 14°42′27″N 0°17′35″E
- Area: 16,000 km^{2} (6,200 sq mi)
- Established: 1970

Ramsar Wetland
- Official name: La Mare d'Oursi
- Designated: 27 June 1990
- Reference no.: 490

Ramsar Wetland
- Official name: Mare de Yomboli
- Designated: 27 February 2019
- Reference no.: 2401

The Sylvo-Pastoral and Partial Faunal Reserve of the Sahel is the largest protected area of Burkina Faso, comprising an area of 16,000 km^{2}. Within the area of the nature reserve are temporary lakes (Mare d'Oursi, Mare de Yomboli, Mare de Kissi) being important for migratory birds.
