= Laba Forest =

Protected forest in Burkina Faso

Coordinates: 11.7168°N 2.6785°W

- IUCN category IV (habitat/species management area)
- Interactive map of Laba Forest
- Location: (Burkina Faso)
- Area: km²

Laba Forest is a protected forest in Burkina Faso. It is located in Sanguié Province.

The estimated terrain elevation above sea level is 260 m (850 ft).
