= Pama Reserve =

- IUCN category IV (habitat/species management area)
- The Pama reserve is the western part of the WAP complex.
- Interactive map of Pama Reserve
- Location: (Burkina Faso)
- Coordinates: 11°26′12″N 0°46′3″E
- Area: 2,237 km^{2} (864 sq mi)
- Established: 1955

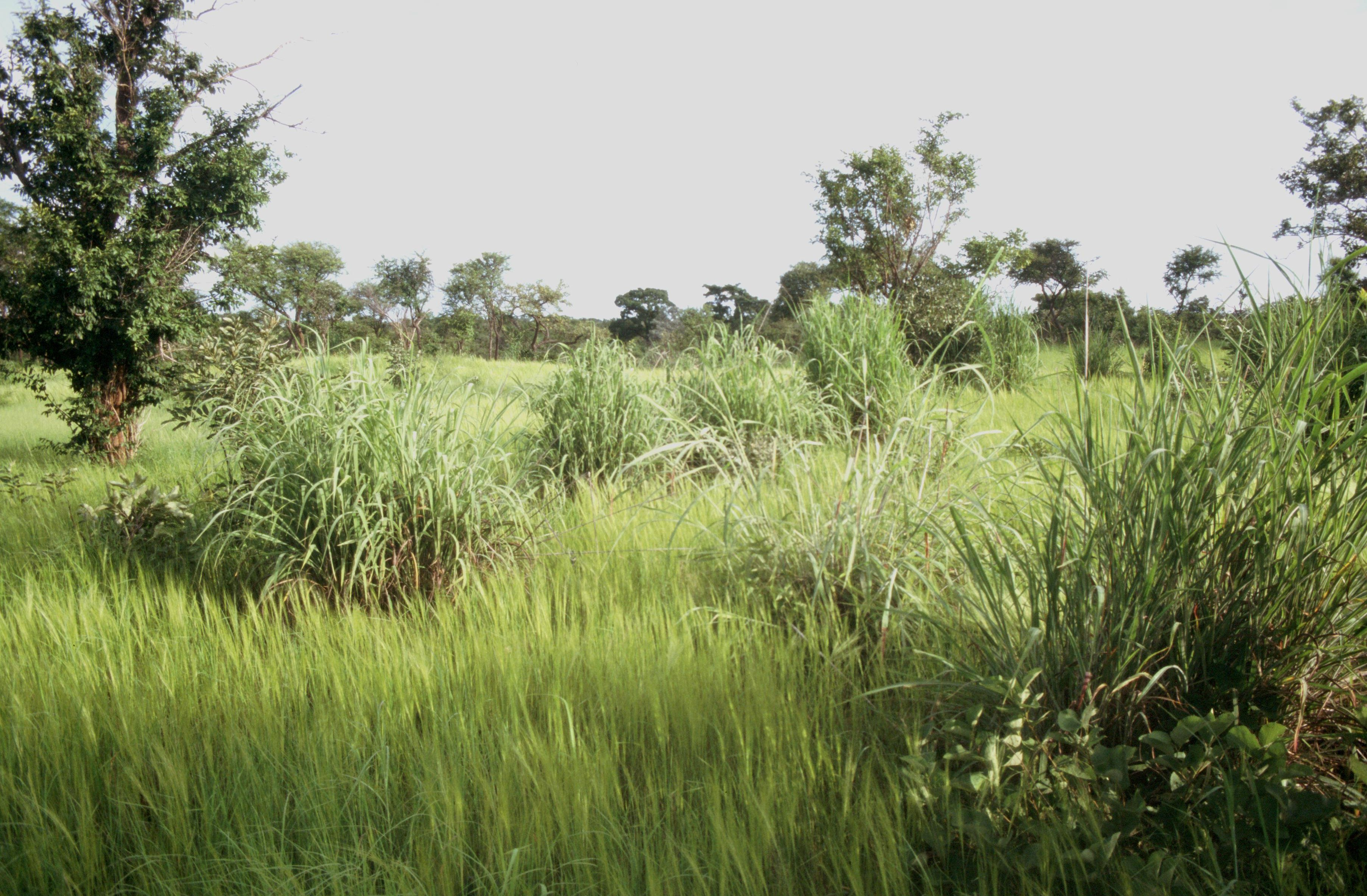
Savanna with Andropogon gayanus tufts.

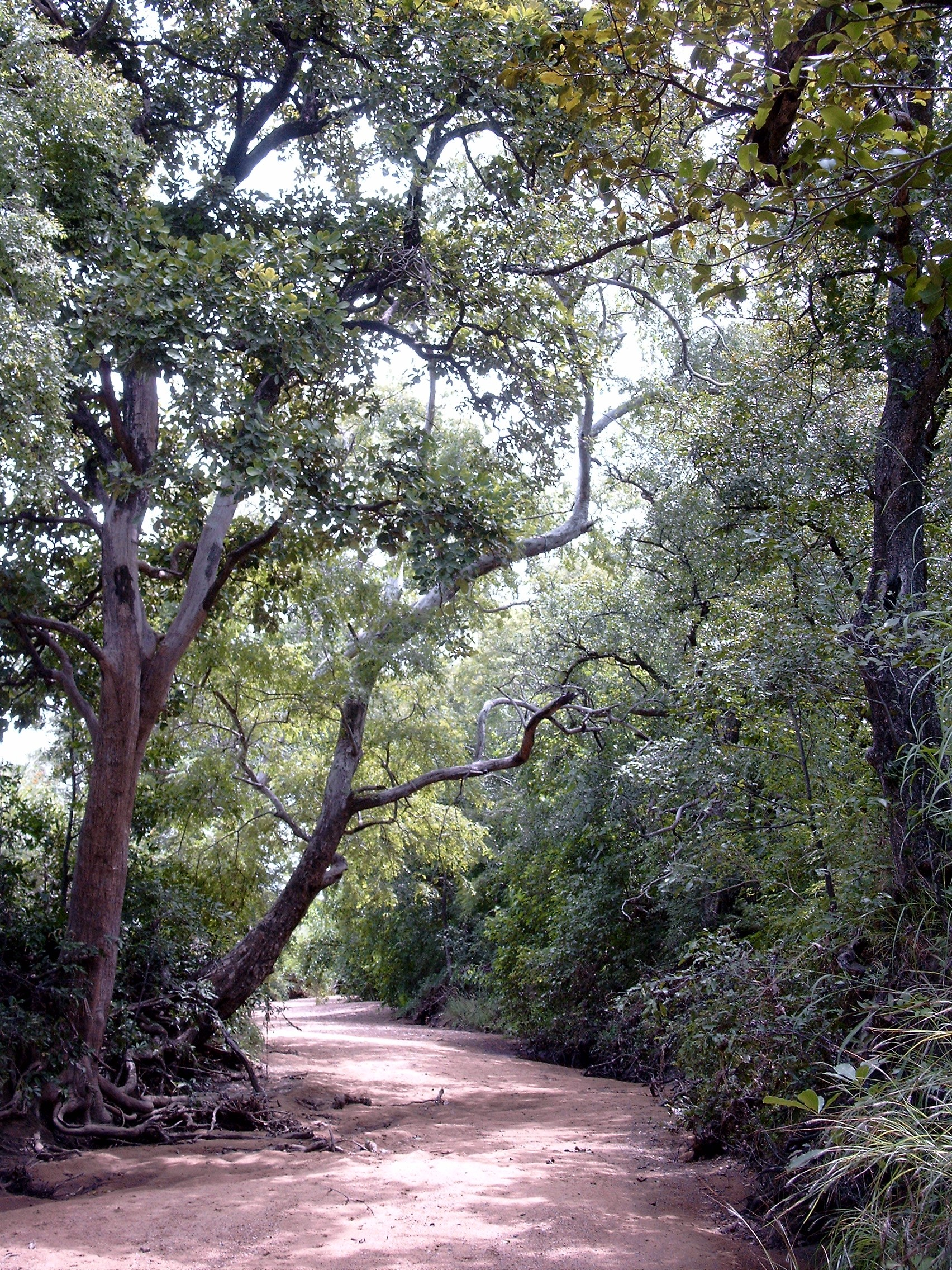
Temporary river in the reserve.

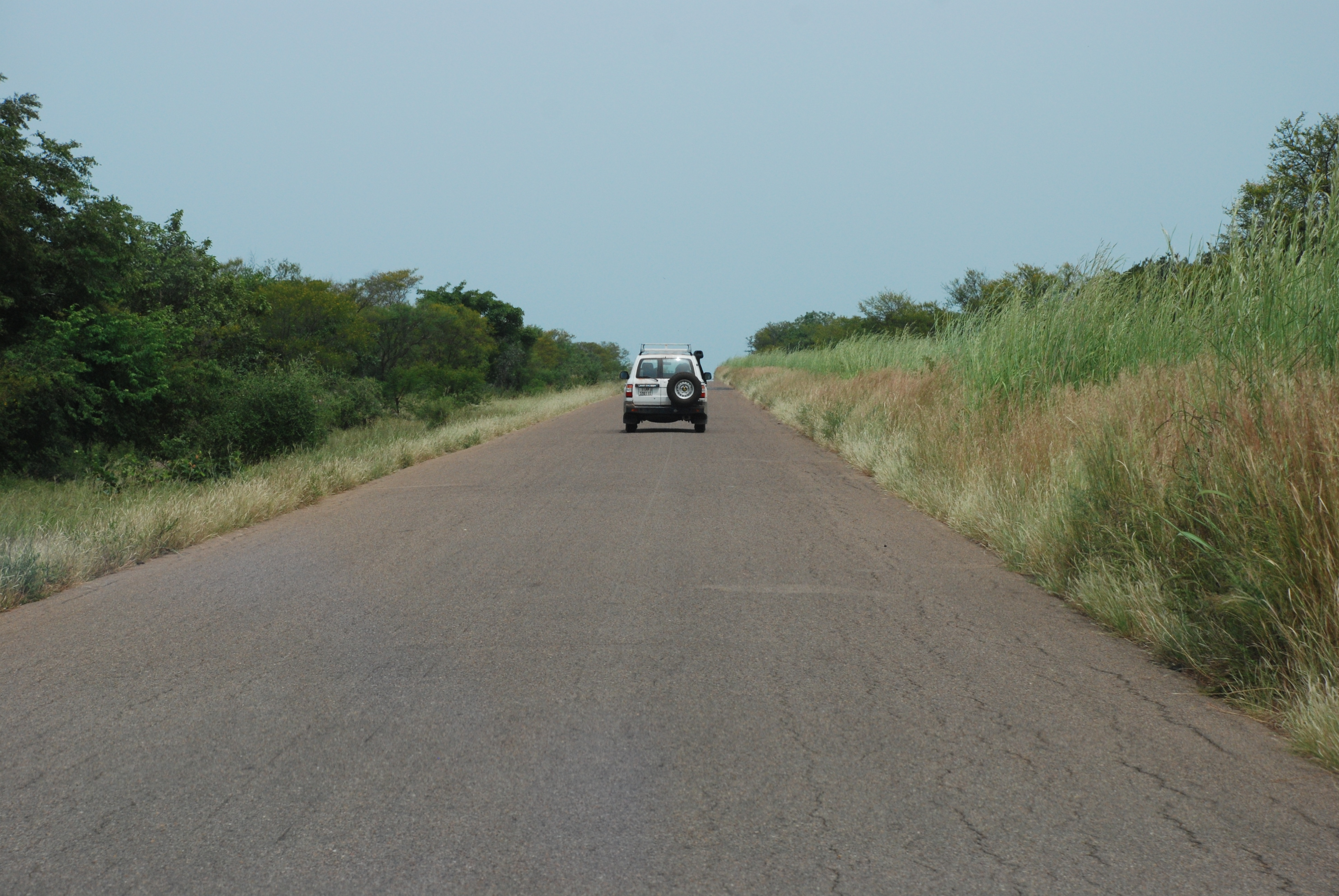
Western border of the Pama reserve. Note the tall grasses on the protected side of the road.

Pama Reserve is a partial reserve in Burkina Faso. Established in 1955, it is located in Kompienga Province and covers an area of 2237 km^{2}. Its eastern border is the Singou river, separating it from two other reserves, Singou and Arli. The western border is the national road N18 from Fada N'Gourma to Porga. In the South the reserve reaches the Pendjari river, being Burkina Faso's border with Benin. The reserve is home to elephants, hippopotamuses, lions, leopards, and 450 species of flowering plants.
