= Mare d'Oursi =

Lake in Burkina Faso

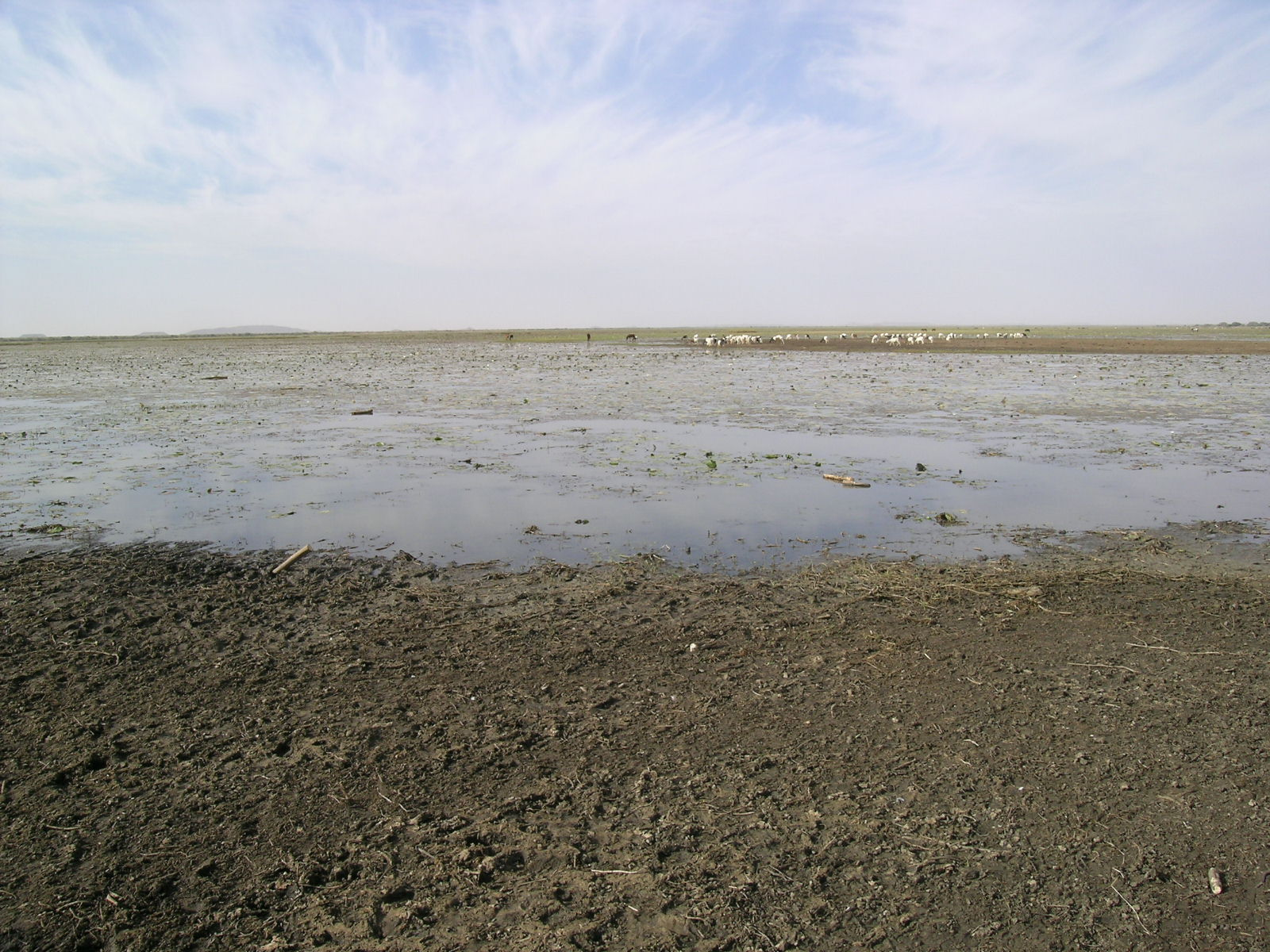

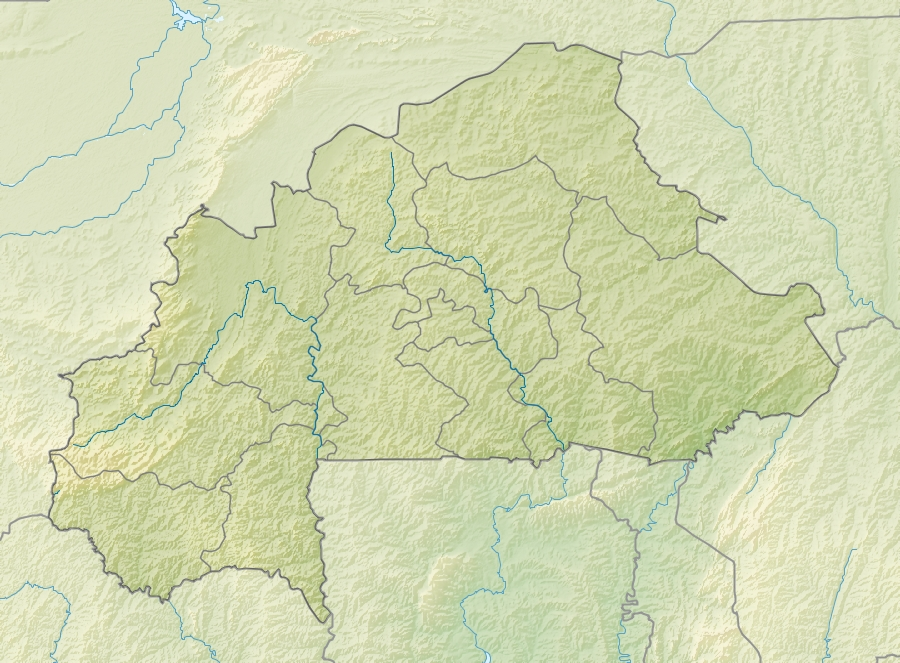
- Location within Burkina Faso
- Location: Oudalan Province, Burkina Faso
- Coordinates: 14°38′N 0°30′W
- Basin countries: Burkina Faso

Ramsar Wetland
- Designated: 27 June 1990
- Reference no.: 490

The Mare d'Oursi is a small, shallow lake in Oudalan Province in northern Burkina Faso, close to the town of Oursi. It is included in the List of Ramsar wetlands of international importance.
