= Wildlife of Burkina Faso =

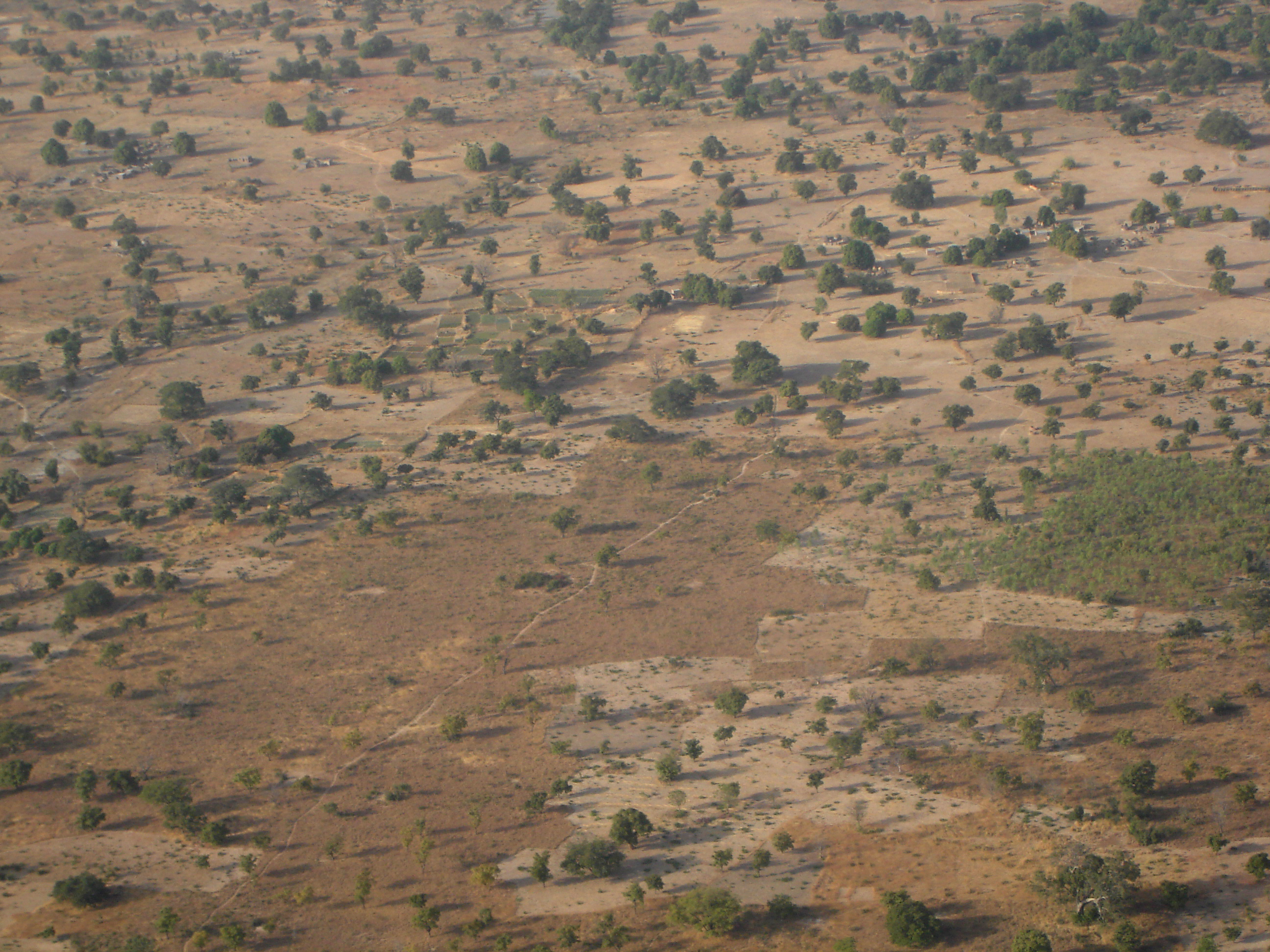
Savanna, west of Ouagadougou, typical of the majority of the country's landscape.

Location of Burkina Faso

Burkina Faso is largely wild bush country with a mixture of grass and small trees in varying proportions. The savanna region is mainly grassland in the rainy season and semi desert during the harmattan period (defined as the period when stormy and dusty Sahara winds blow dry and hot). Fauna, one of the most diverse in West Africa, includes the elephant, hippopotamus, buffalo, monkey, lions, crocodile, giraffe, various types of antelope, and a vast variety of bird and insect life. The country has 147 mammal species, 330 aquatic species including 121 species of fish and 2067 different plant species. Of the plant species, the dominant endemic species are shea tree (Butyrospermum parkii) and the baobab, the former plant species has immense economic value to the country.

Four national parks have been established. These are the Po National Park in the south-centre of the country, Arli National Park established in 1954 in the southeast, W of the Niger National Park, a trans frontier park existing since 1957 in the east bordering Benin and Niger and the Deux Balés National Park. The forests, fauna and fish have been declared part of the national estate of Burkina Faso. In addition, the List of national parks of Burkina Faso consist of one UNESCO Biosphere reserve, three complete reserves, six partial reserves and ten protected forests. However, according to conservation classification conducted between 1936 and 1957, the country has 78 protected areas that cover 38,369 km^{2} (14,814 sq mi), which accounts to about 14% of the area of the country.

== Geography ==
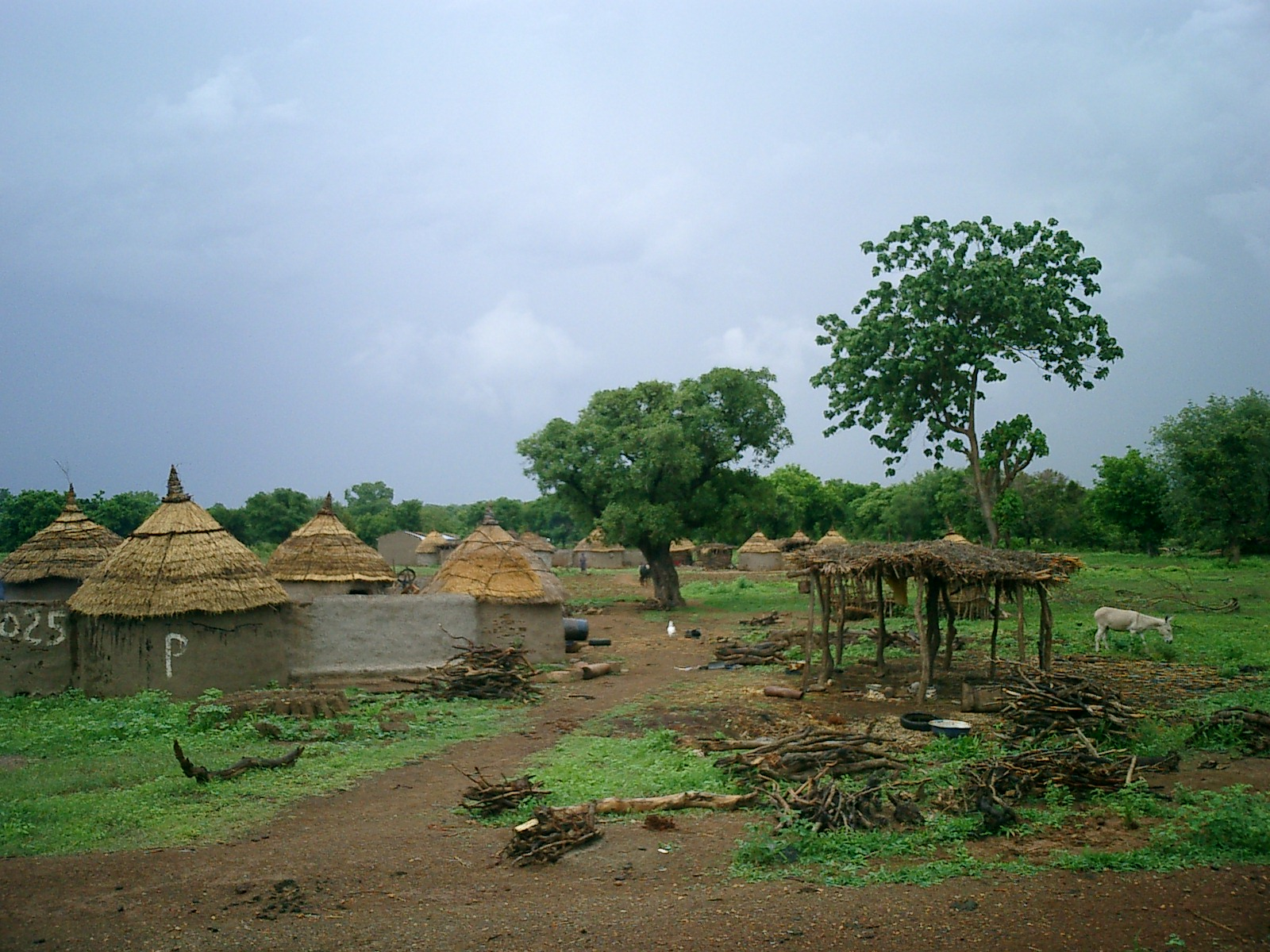
Landscape at Lalgaye

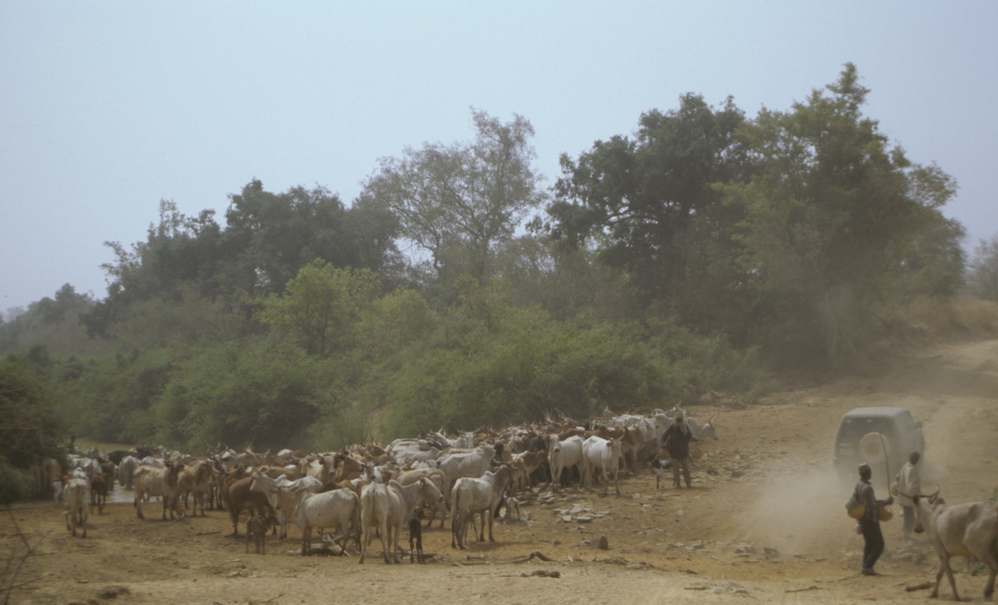
Arli National Park

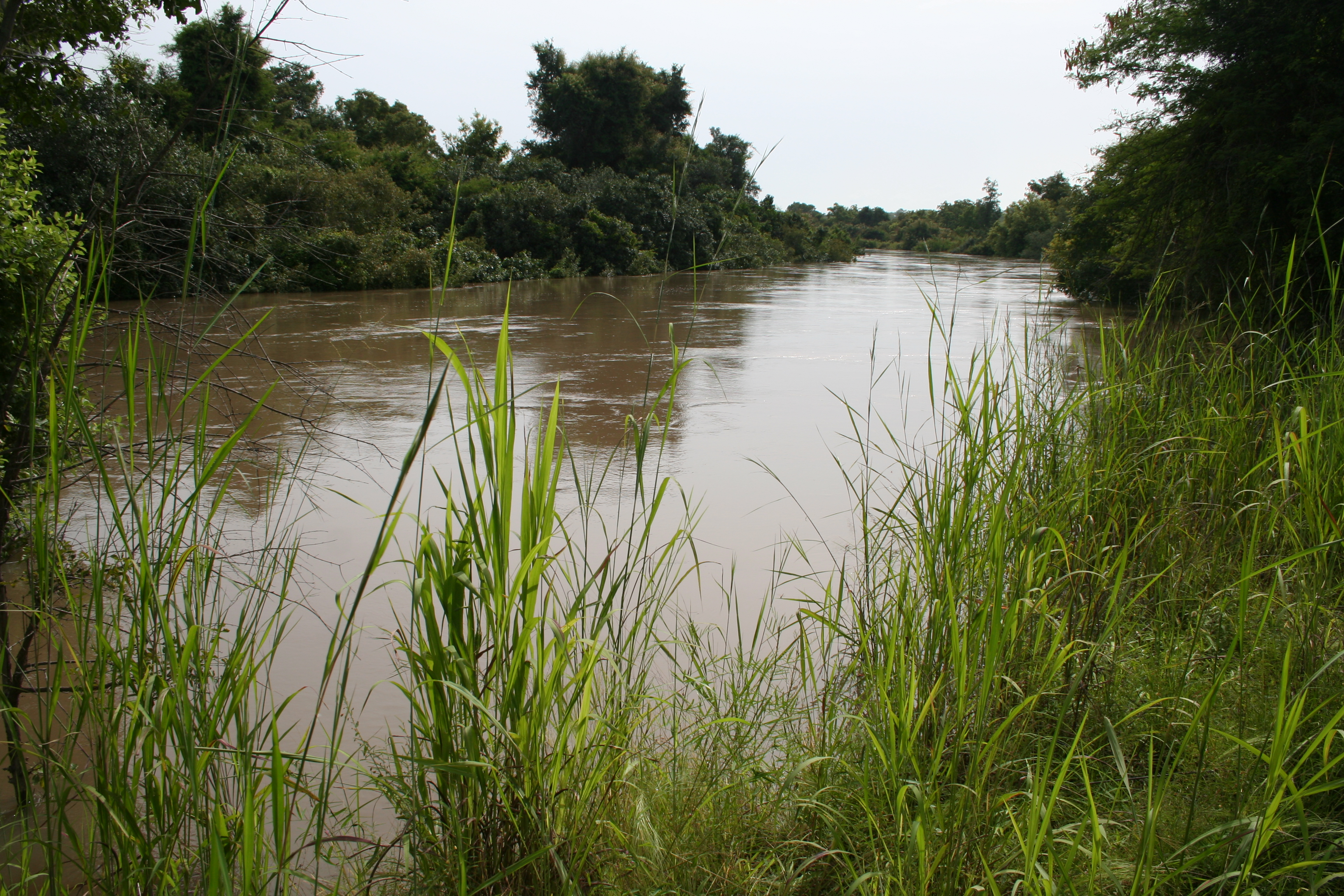
The Mékrou River near Point Triple in the W National Park during the rainy season.

Wildlife area in the landlocked Burkina Faso in western Africa is spread over a plateau area of 270,764 km^{2} (104,543 sq mi). The dominant habitat types are the grassy savanna in the north with transition to the varying thin forests in the south. In Burkina Faso forest cover is around 23% of the total land area, equivalent to 6,216,400 ha (24,002 sq mi) of forest in 2020, down from 7,716,600 ha (29,794 sq mi) in 1990. In 2020, naturally regenerating forest covered 6,039,300 ha (23,318 sq mi) and planted forest covered 177,100 ha (684 sq mi). Of the naturally regenerating forest 0% was reported to be primary forest (consisting of native tree species with no clearly visible indications of human activity) and around 16% of the forest area was found within protected areas. For the year 2015, 100% of the forest area was reported to be under public ownership.

Based on ecological characteristics and climatic conditions, the country is divided under three bio-climatic zones namely, the Sahelian Zone, the Sudanian Zone and the Sudano-Guinean Zone. The Sahelian Zone covers 25% of the area of the northern part of the country, which is further subdivided under the Sahelian and sub-Sahelian sectors. In the Sahelian sector, where the rainfall is only of the order of 400 millimetres (16 in), the vegetation is mostly of shrubs and wooded grassland or steppe. The sub-Sahelian sector represents the transition zone, receives an average annual rainfall of 400–600 millimetres (16–24 in) and represents the transition between the Sahelian and Sudanian bioclimatic zones. The vegetation in this sector has moist Sudan savanna vegetation in the river valleys, while the western half is largely inhabited by humans; most of the large trees in the northern half of the sector are reported to have vanished due to climate change. The Sudan Zone receives higher rainfall in the range of 600–1,000 millimetres (24–39 in) and is further subdivided into three sectors namely, the central plateau sector, the Mouhoun sector and the Pendjari–Mékrou sector and has widely varying vegetation depending on human occupation for agriculture and mostly savanna vegetation, predominantly wooded savanna. the Pendjari–Mékrou sector with its floodplains and many ephemeral rivers, is less populated by humans but has the largest population of mammals in the country; vultures and raptors are also reported. The Sudano-Guinean Zone in the southwest corner of the country is a humid zone with an annual rainfall in the range of 1,000–1,200 millimetres (39–47 in). It is heavily wooded with wooded savannas and gallery forests; it has the ambience of a park with its widespread vegetation of Khaya senegalensis, Daniellia oliveri and Isoberlinia forests, tall grasses and savanna vegetation is also a dominant feature. Its human population distribution is low but the wildlife population is the second largest in the country.

The area is drained by many rivers, the most important of them being the Black Volta (Mouhoun), the Red Volta (Nazinon), and the White Volta (Nakambé), which flow into Ghana on the south and form the Volta River.

=== Climate ===
Rainy season (June to September) is one of the four seasons in Burkina Faso; the other three being, an intermediate season from September to mid November, the summer of harmattan season of the Sahara hot and stormy winds (mid February to mid June) and the dry and winter cool season from mid November to mid February. During the rainy season is when the shrubs and stunted trees flourish in the savanna in the northern region where rainfall incidence is about 10 inches and the rivers flow full with dense vegetation growing in the southern region of the country when the rainfall incidence is as high as 40 inches (1,000 mm).

== National Parks ==
There are four important national parks in Burkina Faso namely, the Arli National Park existing since 1954, the Deux Balés National Park, Kaboré Tambi National Park and the W of the Niger National Park which is a trans-boundary park existing since 1957.

=== Arli National Park ===
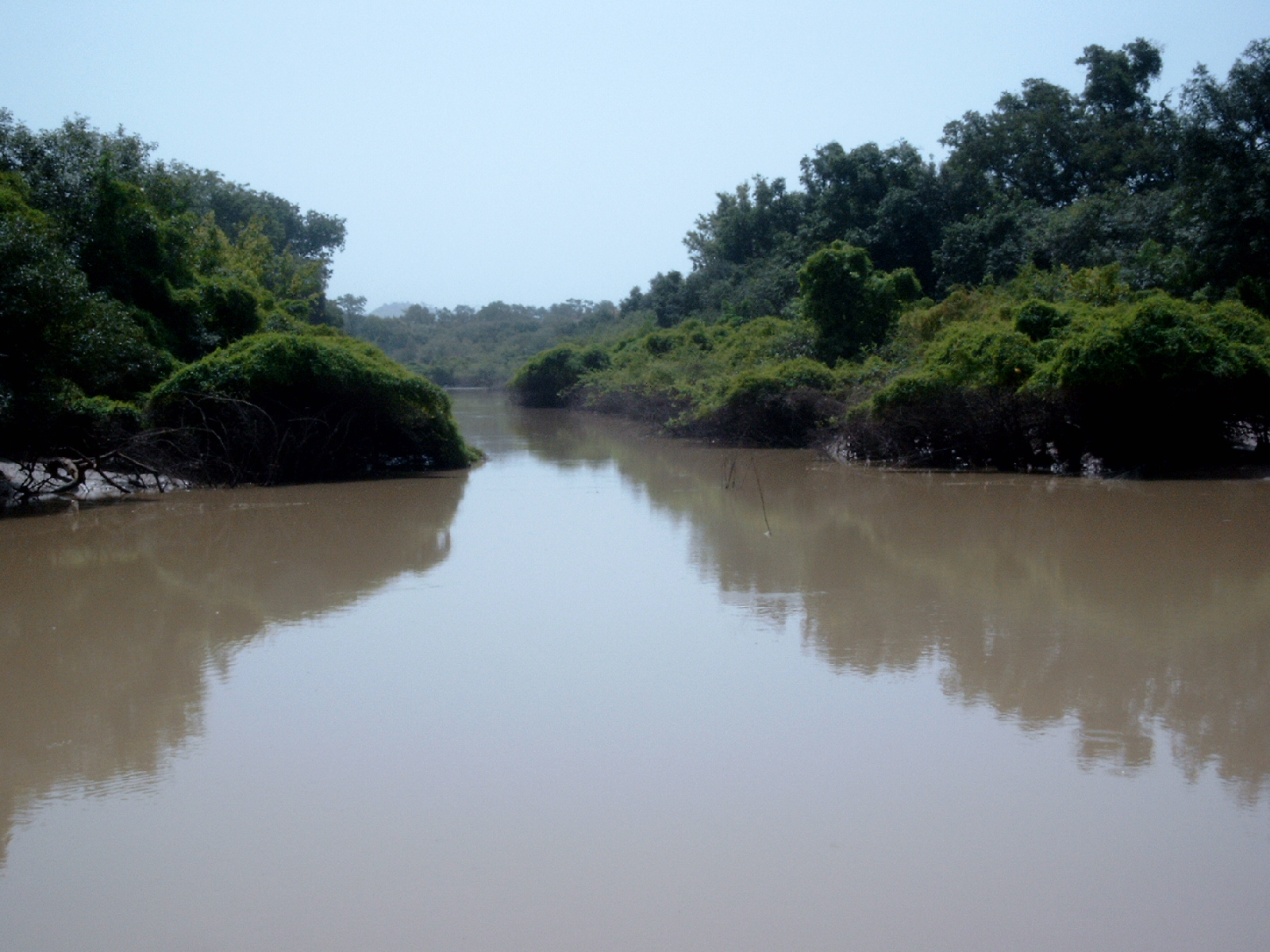
Arli National Park

The Arli National Park, covering an area of 76,000 hectares (190,000 acres), lies to the southwest of Arli–W–Singou complex. It borders with Benin (the Pendjari River forms the boundary) and Singou Game Ranch on its northwest direction and has large network of drainage system which has vast flood plains. Within the park boundary, the Falaise de Gobnangou is a prominent hill feature with cliffs that extends over 50 kilometres (31 mi) from the southwest to the northeast. The park also has many inselbergs. Shrub and tree-savanna (extensive growth of Isoberlinia doka) in the non-flooded areas, Mitragyna inermis with gallery forests in seasonally flooded areas, baobab Adansonia digitata trees near old village sites are some of the vegetation types found in the park.

=== Deux Balés National Park ===
The Deux Balés National Park, is located in central eastern Burkina Faso, within Mouhoun Province. It is situated to the west of the Black Volta River. It has an elevation range of 235–310 metres (771–1,017 ft). The park was first established in 1937 as the forêts classées des Deux Balés ('the Deux Balés Classified Forests') with an area of 610 km^{2} (240 sq mi). In 2001, the largest number of elephants in West Africa were found in Deux Balés (together with Baporo Forest), estimated at four hundred of them.

=== Kaboré Tambi National Park ===
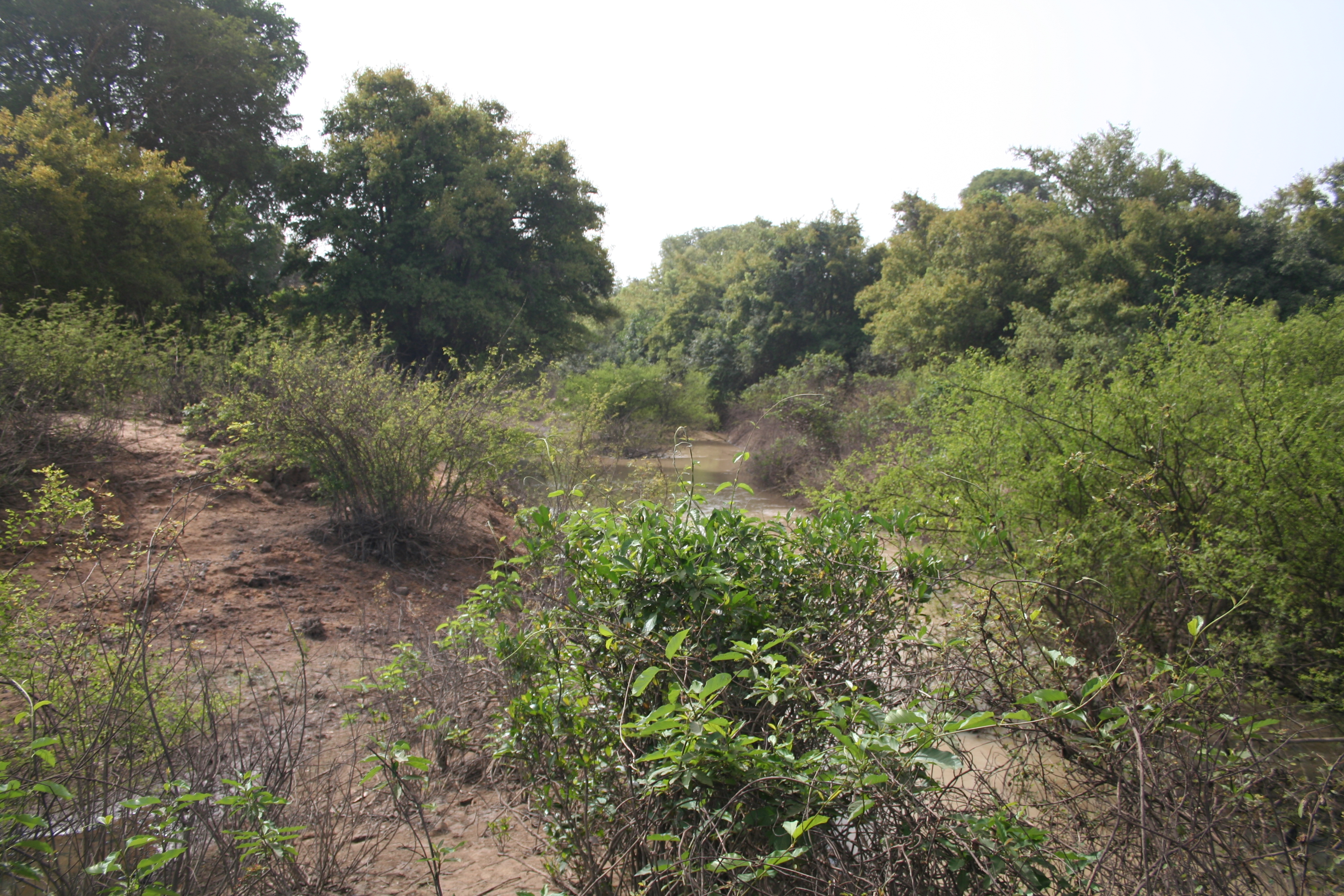
View of the Red Volta in Kaboré Tambi National Park

The Kaboré Tambi National Park is situated between Ouagadougou and the border with Ghana. It follows the course of the Nazinon River. It was founded in 1976 as Pô National Park or known as Parc National Kaboré Tambi (PNKT). The park has an area of 155,000 hectares (380,000 acres) in the alluvial floodplain on both banks of the ephemeral Volta Rouge River; the river results to small water holes during the summer season. A number of small marshes and lakes also dominate the scene. It maintains contiguity with the Nazinga Game Ranch of 94,000 hectares (230,000 acres) area, the Sissili Hunting Concession of 32,700 hectares (81,000 acres) ha and the village hunting zones around Nazinga and Sissili villages. The park has varied topography with geological formations of granite outcrops, lateritic plateaus and several isolated high mountains. The vegetation types found here are northern Sudan savanna, shrub savanna, tree-savanna and gallery forests. The park is home to lion, elephant, buffalo and a number of antelope species. Poaching and deforestation activities are an issue in the park. The main road from Ouagadougou to Bolgatanga in northern Ghana runs across the park.

=== W of the Niger National Park ===
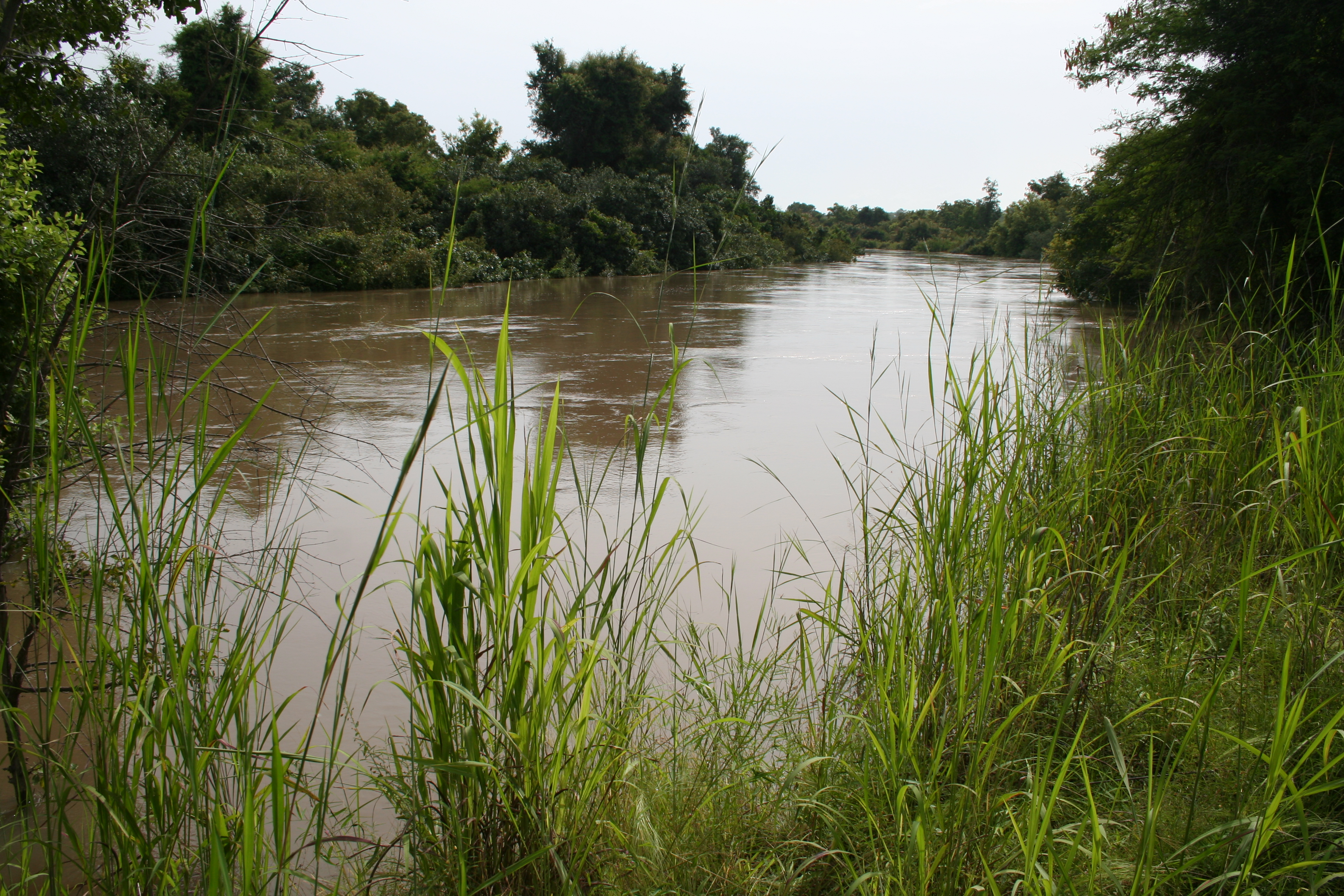
The Mékrou River in W National Park

The W of the Niger National Park was created in August 1954. It is a major national park of the three countries of Niger, Benin and Burkina Faso, and is governed by the three governments. It is around a meander in the River Niger shaped like a "W". Until 2008, the implementation of a regional management was supported by the EU-funded Project ECOPAS (French: Ecosystèmes Protégés en Afrique Soudano-Sahélienne). The three national parks operate under the name W Transborder Park. In the three nations, the park covers about 10,000 km^{2} (3,900 sq mi), largely uninhabited by humans, having been until the 1970s a malarial zone of wetlands formed by the delta of the Mékrou River with the Niger, broken by rocky hills. It was declared a Ramsar site in 1990. A cattle route from Mail and Niger to Tago passes through the park creating conservation problems which are proposed to be tackled through many conservation and biodiversity support programmes.

== Fauna ==
As of 2006, Burkina Faso is considered to be one of the West African countries with the largest faunal population.

=== Mammals ===
Mammals in Burkina Faso include aardvark, African bush elephant, African civet, African clawless otter, African golden cat, African ground squirrel, West African wild dog, western dwarf buffalo, bushbuck, Cape hare, Cape hyrax, caracal, Northwest African cheetah, common chimpanzee, common genet, Dorcas gazelle, fennec fox, four-toed hedgehog, giant pangolin, West African giraffe, Egyptian wolf, Hausa genet, hippopotamus, African leopard, West African lion, olive baboon, oribi, pale fox, patas monkey, honey badger, red-fronted gazelle, reedbuck, roan antelope, rusty-spotted genet, Senegal bushbaby, serval, side-striped jackal, slender mongoose, speckle-throated otter, spotted hyena, striped hyena, striped polecat, sun squirrel, tree pangolin, warthog, water chevrotain, western hartebeest, white-tailed mongoose and African wildcat.

The common chimpanzee is considered locally extinct in Burkina Faso, but may be migrating back into the country during the rainy season. Hyena are widespread but at low densities.

=== Reptiles ===
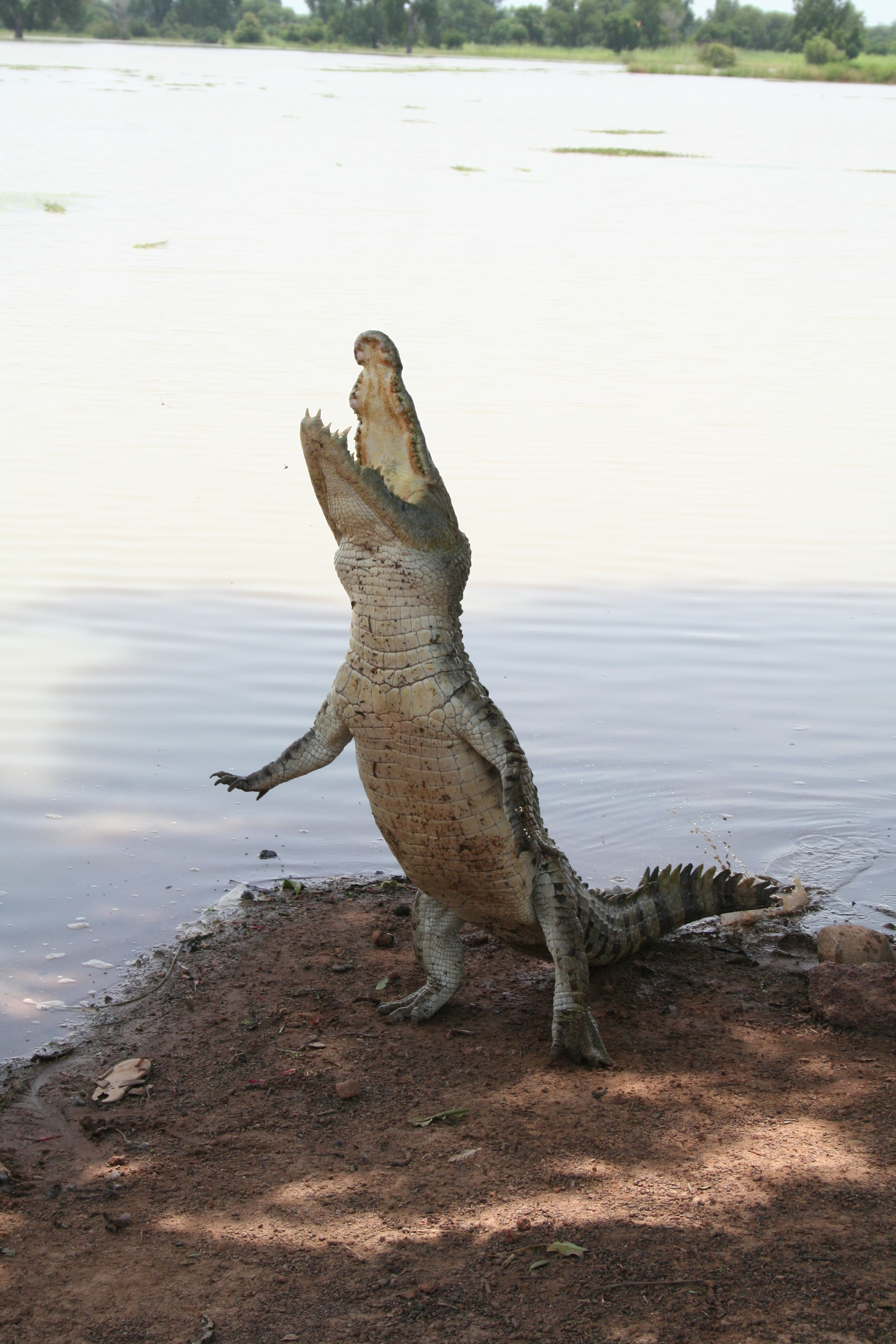
Sacred crocodiles of Bazoulé, Burkina Faso.

Three crocodile species are found in the wild, slender-snouted crocodile, Nile crocodile, and dwarf crocodile. According to BirdLife International, there are 119 migrant birds which visit the country out of which 81 belong to Palaearctic species including two species namely Falco naumanni (vulnerable) and Gallinago media (near threatened) of global conservation concern. There are also 10 Important Bird Areas (IBAs) identified which cover 20260 km^{2} accounting for 7.4% area of the country.

=== Birds ===
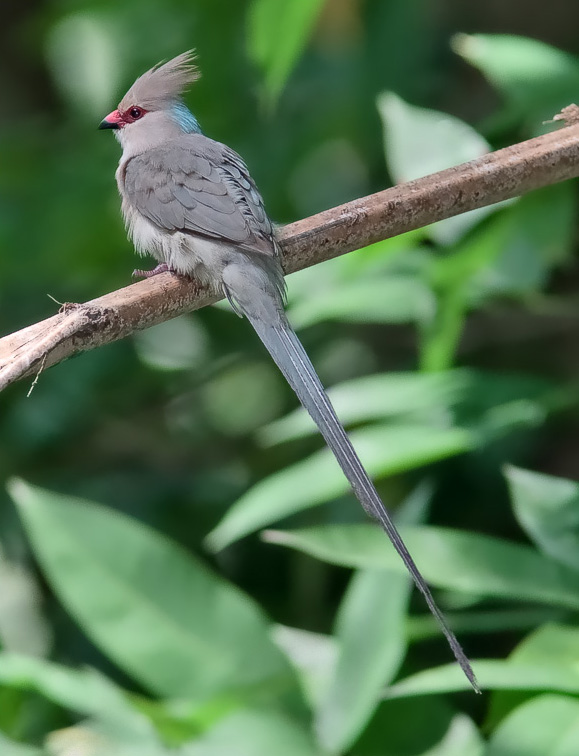
Urocolius macrourus, blue-naped mousebird

In Burkina Faso, as of 2005, 497 bird species of various families, including 35 rare or accidental species, 12 near threatened species, three vulnerable species (lesser kestrel Falco naumanni, white-headed vulture Trigonoceps occipitalis and Beaudouin's snake-eagle Circaetus beaudouini) and one endangered species (Egyptian vulture Neophron percnopterus) have been reported. These cover species under several families such as: thirteen of Anatidae, one of Numididae (helmeted guineafowl Numida meleagris), six of Phasianidae, one of Podicipedidae, two of Ciconiidae, one of Anhingidae (African darter Anhinga rufa), one of Pelecanidae (great white pelican Pelecanus onocrotalus), one of Scopidae (hamerkop Scopus umbretta), seventeen of Ardeidae, five of Threskiornithidae, one of family Pandionidae (osprey Pandion haliaetus), thirty-nine of Accipitridae (mostly eagles, vultures and hawks), one of Sagittariidae (secretary-bird Sagittarius serpentarius), eleven of Falconidae, nine of Rallidae, one of Rallidae (African finfoot Podica senegalensis), six of Otididae, one of Gruidae (black crowned-crane Balearica pavonina), three of Burhinidae, eleven of Charadriidae, two of Recurvirostridae, two of Jacanidae, eighteen of Scolopacidae, two of Turnicidae, five of Glareolidae, one of Rostratulidae (Greater painted-snipe Rostratula benghalensis), eight of Laridae, two of Pteroclidae, thirteen of Columbidae, two of Psittacidae, two of Musophagidae, twelve of Cuculidae (cuckoos), one of Tytonidae (barn owl Tyto alba), eight of Strigidae, eight of Apodidae, one of Coliidae (blue-naped mousebird Urocolius macrourus), one of Trogonidae (Narina trogon Apaloderma narina), nine of Alcedinidae, eight of Meropidae, five of Coraciidae, one of Upupidae (Eurasian hoopoe Upupa epops, two of Phoeniculidae, four of Bucerotidae, four of Lybiidae, two of Indicatoridae, two of Indicatoridae, nine of Picidae, three of Platysteiridae, two of Prionopidae, nine of Malaconotidae, two of Campephagidae, nine of Laniidae, two of Oriolidae, three of Dicruridae, two of Monarchidae, three of Corvidae, one of Nicatoridae (western nicator Nicator chloris, nine of Alaudidae, seventeen of Hirundinidae, one of Stenostiridae (African blue-flycatcher Elminia longicauda), one of Paridae (white-shouldered black-tit Parus guineensis), two of Remizidae, one of Salpornithidae (African spotted creeper Salpornis salvadori), two of Pycnonotidae, four of Phylloscopidae, six of Acrocephalidae, twenty of Cisticolidae, one of Hyliotidae (yellow-bellied hyliota Hyliota flavigaster), twenty-seven species of Muscicapidae, three of Turdidae, three of Timaliidae, one of Zosteropidae (northern yellow white-eye Zosterops senegalensis), nine of Sturnidae, one of Buphagidae (yellow-billed oxpecker Buphagus africanus), eight of Motacillidae, four of Emberizidae, three of Fringillidae, three of Passeridae, nineteen of Ploceidae, nineteen of Estrildidae and six of Viduidae.

Ten Important Bird Areas (IBAs) which cover about 20,260 km^{2} (7,820 sq mi) (7.4% of the area of the country). These have Sudan–Guinea Savanna biome (A04) (with 30 of the 32 species of this biome), Sahel biome (A03) (with six of eight biome species) and with breeding colony of Gyps rueppellii in the Arli–W–Singou Park complex (accounting for more than 1% of the global population of the species). The number of resident bird species is reported by BirdLife International as 318, out of which 119 are migratory birds. Of the migratory birds, 81 belong to Palaearctic family and two species are of global conservation concern, namely Falco naumanni (vulnerable) and Gallinago media (near threatened).

=== Insects ===
Lepidoptera

== Flora ==
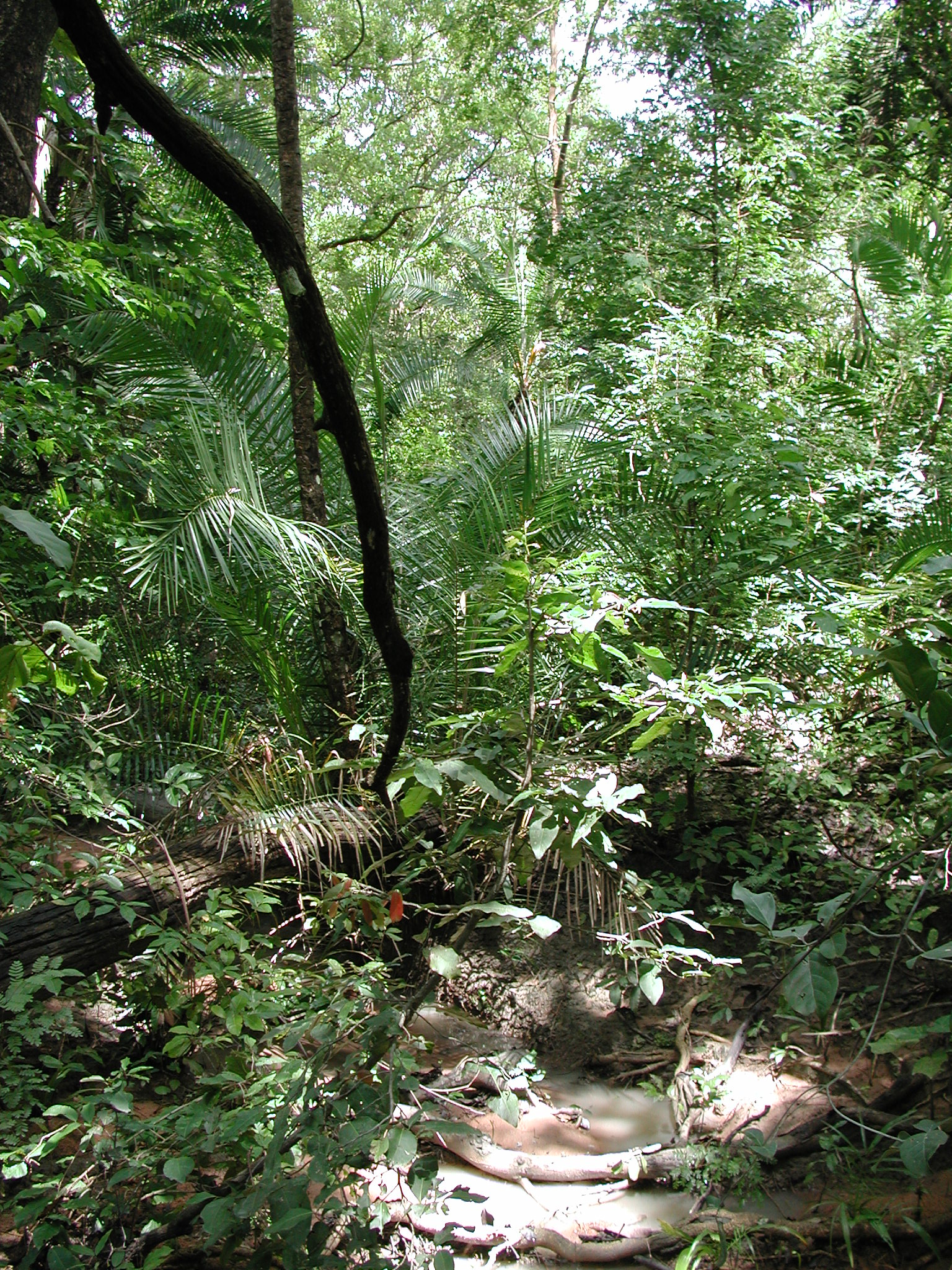
Niangoloko Forest

The flora of Burkina Faso is composed of 2067 plant species. The most important families in terms of species richness and abundance are the grasses (Poaceae) and legumes (Fabaceae). Many species are distributed widely in the savannas regions of Africa. There are however two endemic plants, Pandanus brevifrugalis and Isoetes jaegeri.

Approximately 15% of the country has forest cover while wooded land constitutes approximately 34% of the area. Very little closed forest can be found and this is mainly of the gallery forest type along waterways. The open forests include savanna of four types, namely Sahelian, Sahelian-Sudanian, Sudanian, and Sudanian-Guinean. Though much of the country is dry and sparse, vegetation can vary considerably. Northern Burkina Faso consists mainly of savanna, acacia woodland, and during the wet season, prickly shrubs and stunted trees flourish. Herbaceous plants include broadleaf deciduous, shrub, desert shrub, semi-desert savanna and thorny scrub. Crops include banana, cassava, bougainvillea, cotton, guava, maize, spinach, Malabar spinach, millet, onions, papaya, sorghum, tomatoes, and yams. Most of the country consists of sparse savanna grasslands, with the occasional shrub or acacia. Although the country only has about 15% forest cover overall, there are many forests in the south, growing denser along the banks of the perennial rivers. These include Diéfoula Forest, Logoniégué Forest, Laba Forest, Dida Forest, Koulbi National Forest, Bontioli Reserve Forest, Nabere Partial Reserve Forest, Koflandé Forest, Maro Forest, Tui Forest, Deux Balés Forest, Kalio Forest, Tisse Forest, Dibon Forest, Pâ Forest, Mou Forest, Boulon Forest, Tigo Forest, Nakambe Forest and Niangoloko Forest, of which about 16% have official protection.

Poverty means that deforestation is a problem in the country and each year the country loses approximately 32,000 hectares of forests, to make way for agriculture and for fuelwood, which around 90% of the national population are dependent upon. Numerous NGOs are active in the country, educating farmers and encouraging them to minimize land clearing and plant trees as well as cultivate the land.

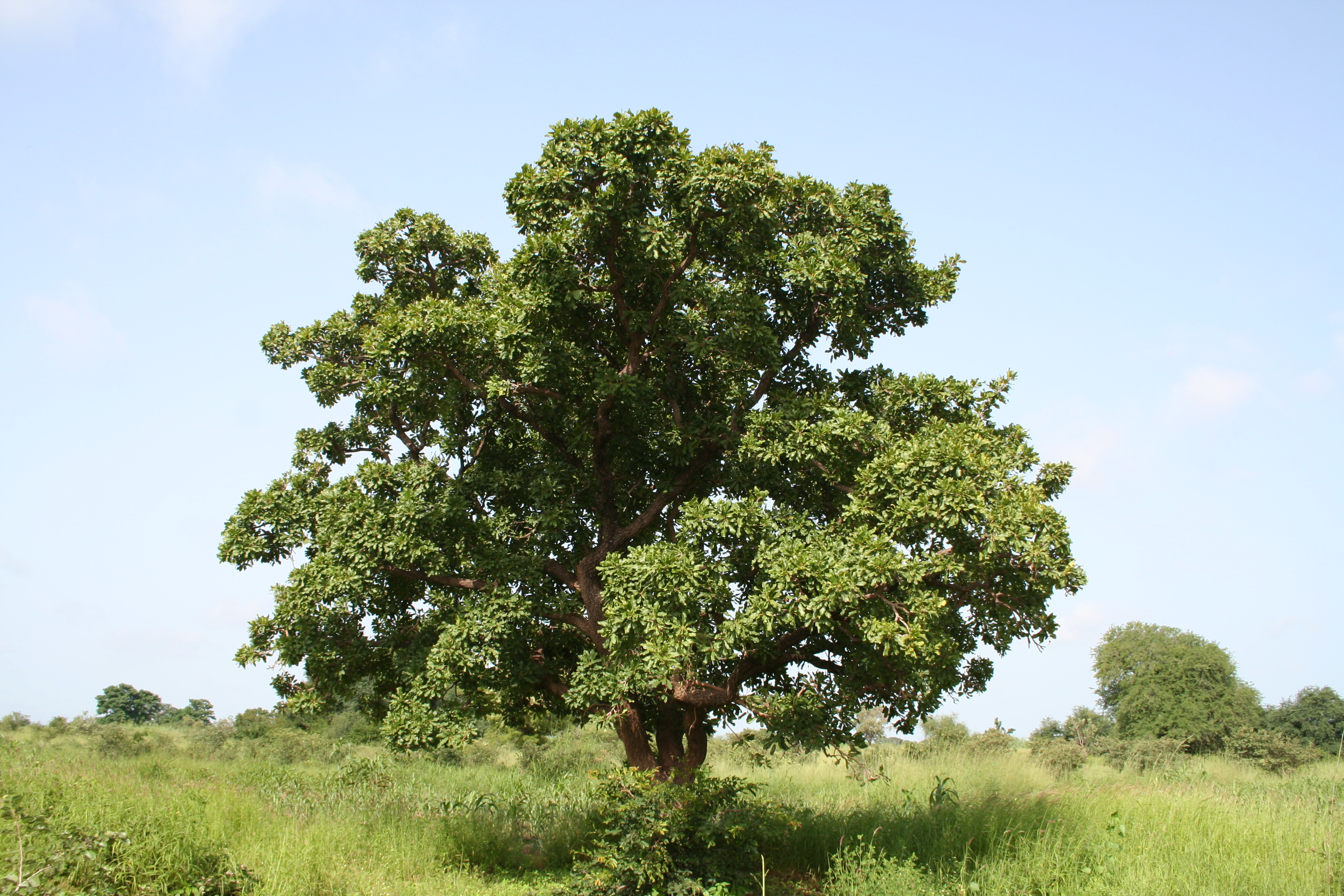
Vitellaria paradoxa or [shea tree, the largest collection in Burkina Faso

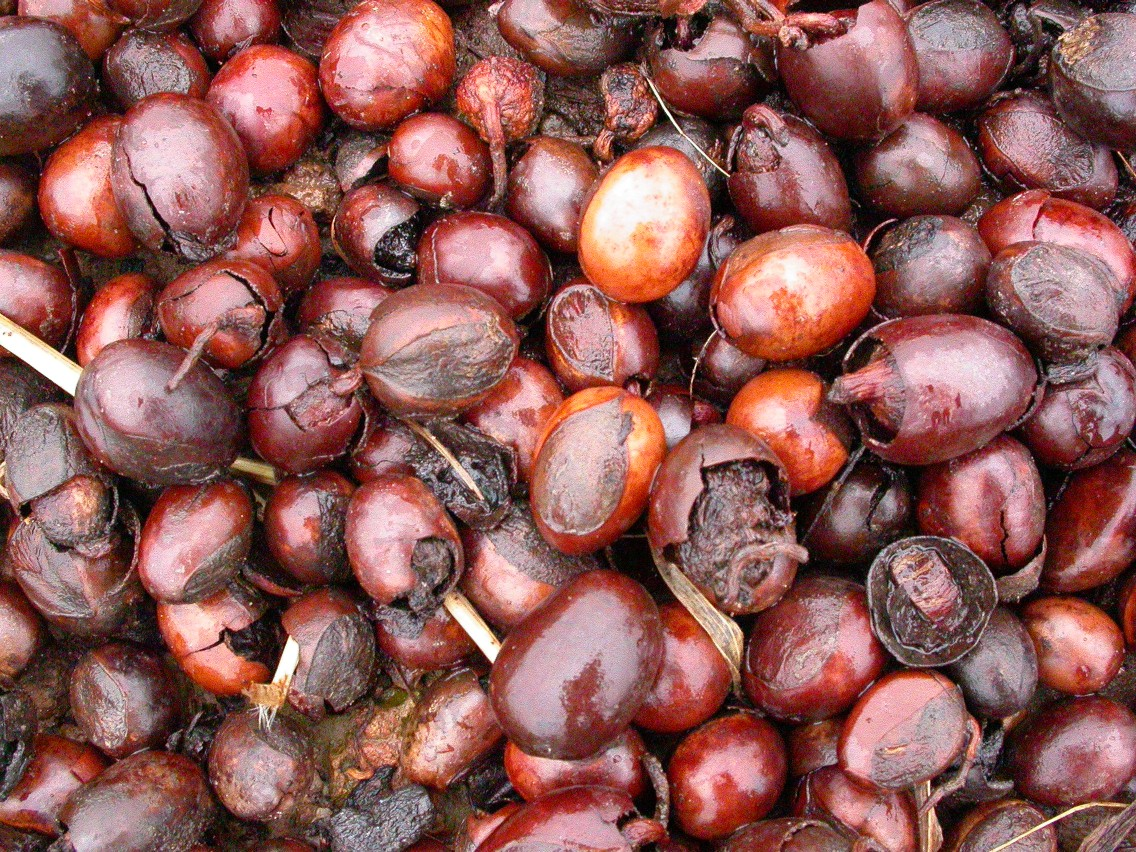
Shea nuts termed "women's gold" used to make shea butter, cosmetics and chocolates in Burkina Faso

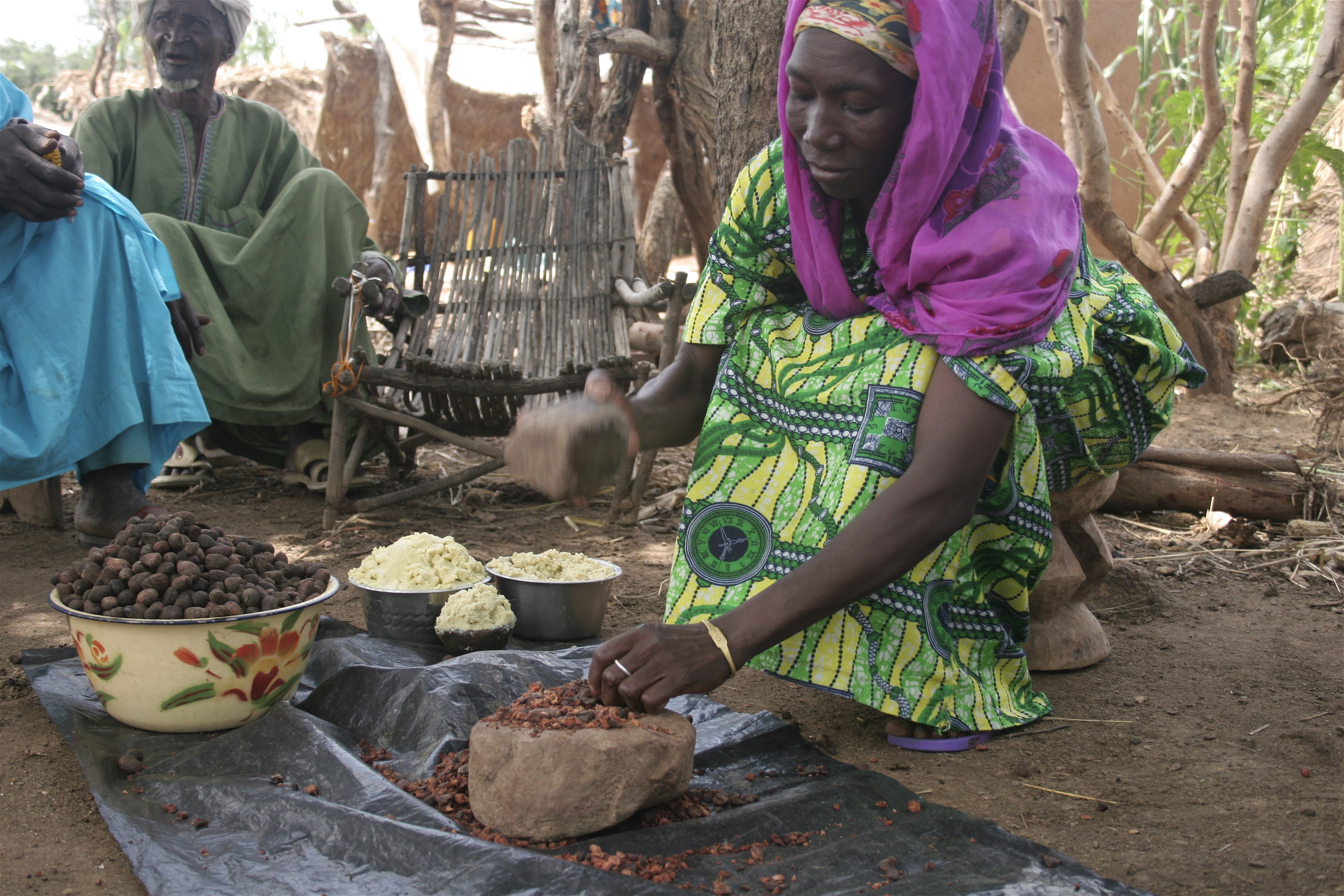
Shea nut processing by women in Burkina Faso

Trees of note include the shea tree (known as karité in the local Dioula language and the baobab. Although the shea tree is indigenous to the semi-arid Sahel region of West Africa, Burkina Faso contains the largest number of them. The shea tree is extremely important to the Burkinabe people and is termed as "women's gold" by the villagers, because the nuts of shea tree can be collected and then processed by crushing and grinding to yield shea butter, important in cuisine and in exports, for use in the manufacture of chocolate and cosmetics such as soap. Shea nuts are the country's third most important export, after cotton and livestock; in 1997, an average tonne of unprocessed shea nuts sold domestically for CFA70,000 (US$980) and overseas for CFA1,00,000 (US$1400). The most important centres of shea butter production are in Sissili Province and Ziro Province. The bark of the tree is also used as an ingredient in traditional medicines and the shell of nut is said to be able to repel mosquitoes and is also said to protect existing trees. The Bambara groundnut (Vigna subterranea) is also grown in abundance; Burkina Faso produced some 20,000 tonnes in 1989, after peanuts (160,000 tonnes) and cowpeas (74,000 tonnes). Between 1982 and 1985, an attempt was made to improve the Bambara groundnut, an initiative which involved the participation of plant breeders in the Grain Legumes Programme.

The country contains populations of Vitellaria paradoxa trees, which often have problems with parasites of the family Loranthaceae. Four species of Tapinanthus (Tapinanthus dodoneifolius, Tapinanthus globiferus, Tapinanthus ophiodes and Tapinanthus pentagonia) are widespread all across Burkina Faso and Mali and are also subject to being affected by pests. Other trees include Acacia, flamboyant tree, Delonix regia, and neem tree.

== Conservation ==
Fauna conservation areas were first established in 1926, which included five 'parcs de refuge' that covered 536,700 ha.

Global Environment Facility (GEF) in its report to the World Bank to promote conservation of natural habitat in Burkina Faso reported that the biodiversity species profile of Burkina Faso contains "655 wildlife species (mammals and birds); 330 aquatic species (includes 121 fish species), and 1054 plant species (751 grass, 304 tree and brush species)", based on meagre data. It was also noted that the natural habitats were found now only in parks, reserves and gazetted forests as agricultural operations dominated the scene in 70% area of the country. The oryx, cheetah, and giraffe are reported to be totally extinct, probably includes Burkina redneck ostrich. The nearing extinction species were reported to be black and white colobus, dama gazelle, leopard and topi. This alarming situation of loss of biodiversity resulted in creation of national operational strategies not only for rural development in 2001 but also for reforms in the wildlife and protected area sector in 1995 (a Forestry Code was introduced defining the National Forestry Policy and establishing 12 Wildlife Conservation Units covering the entire country in followed in 1996) and Biodiversity Strategy and Action Plan in 2000 with the objective stated as to "ensure responsible management of biological diversity by the populations by 2025".

In conservation and sustainable resources management efforts, the IBA Local Conservation Group with help from BirdLife Partners around the world have set up "site support groups" in Burkina Faso, which was initially begun in 1959 to count birds. This resulted in the training of local volunteers as ornithologists. In 2009, Vogelwacht Utrecht, a Dutch regional volunteer birding group, supported efforts conserve migratory birds. Cambridgeshire Bird Club in the UK has also pitched in with support. However, all these efforts are concentrated at Lake Oursi (included in the List of Ramsar wetlands of international importance) and are yet to permeate to a national scale.
