= Wasawasa =

Local dish from Ghana/West Africa

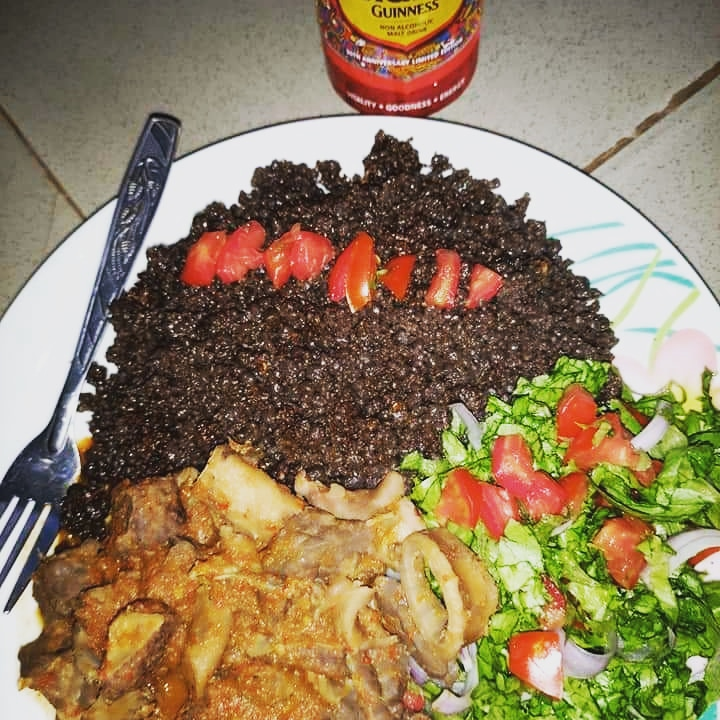
A picture depicting Wasawasa.

Wasawasa is a popular dish eaten in Dagbon and other parts of Northern Ghana. It is also eaten in some West African countries, such as Burkina Faso, Benin, Nigeria etc. It is made from dried yam peelings called jaling, which have been grounded into flour and steamed. Wasawasa is mostly eaten with spicy sauces and sometimes garnished with vegetables, accompanied with shea butter or raw groundnut oil and fried fish. Wasawasa is sometimes served with beans, pasta, and salad.

== Ingredients for Wasawasa ==
There are a variety of ingredients that can be used to prepare Wasawasa dish though these ingredients may be dependent on the choices of the beneficiaries but the most common or primary ingredients include; yam flour, salt, freshly ground pepper, water for steaming, onions, groundnut or shea butter oil. Wasawasa is cooked with a chamber pot and steamed until it's ready. It usually turns black after cooking.

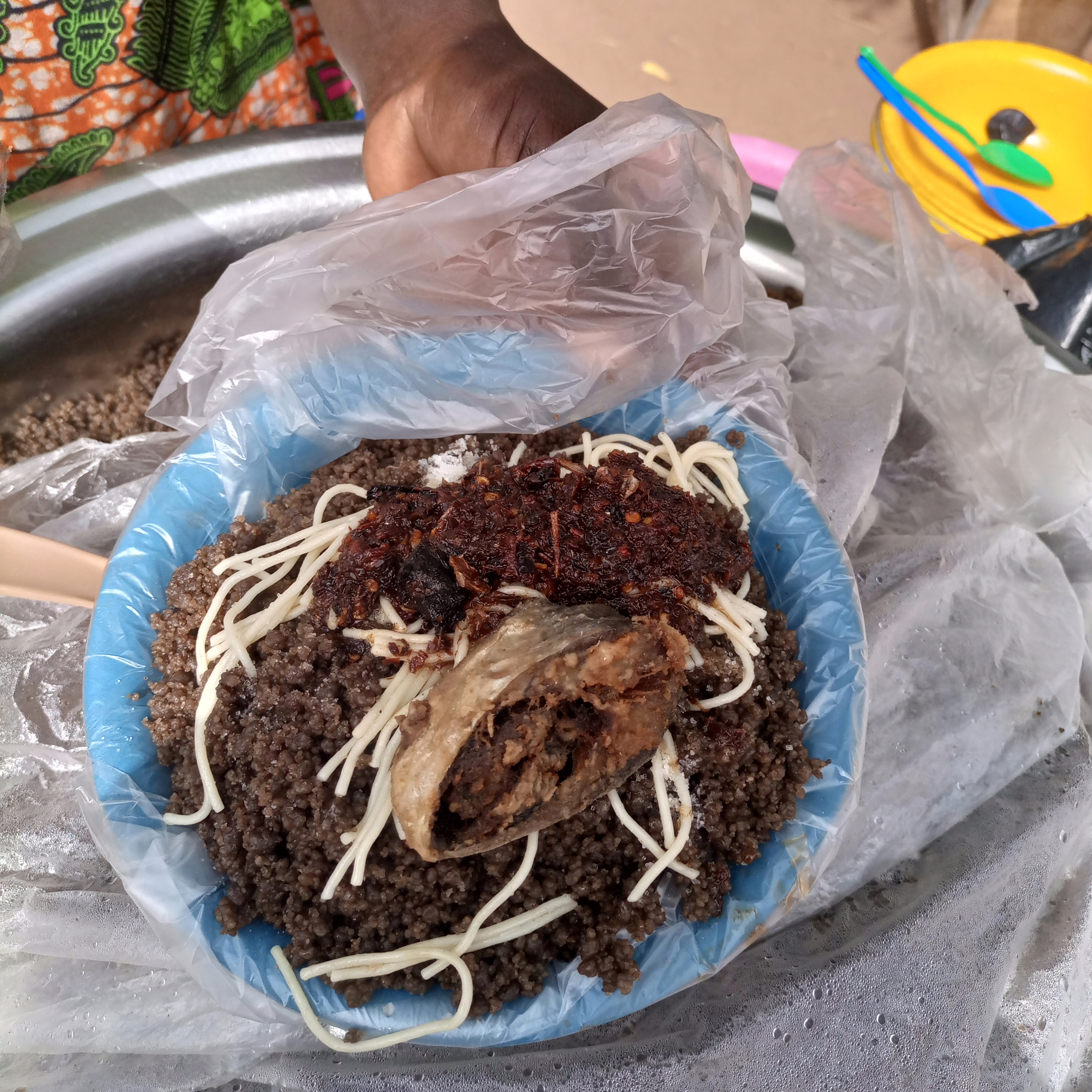

== Nutrition ==
It provides carbohydrates and proteins to the body.
