= Cochlospermum angolense =

Scientific classification
- Kingdom: Plantae
- Clade: Tracheophytes
- Clade: Angiosperms
- Clade: Eudicots
- Clade: Rosids
- Order: Malvales
- Family: Bixaceae
- Genus: Cochlospermum
- Species: C. angolense

Binomial name
- Cochlospermum angolense Welw. ex Oliv.

Synonyms
- Maximilianea angolensis (Welw. ex Oliv.) Kuntze

Species of tree

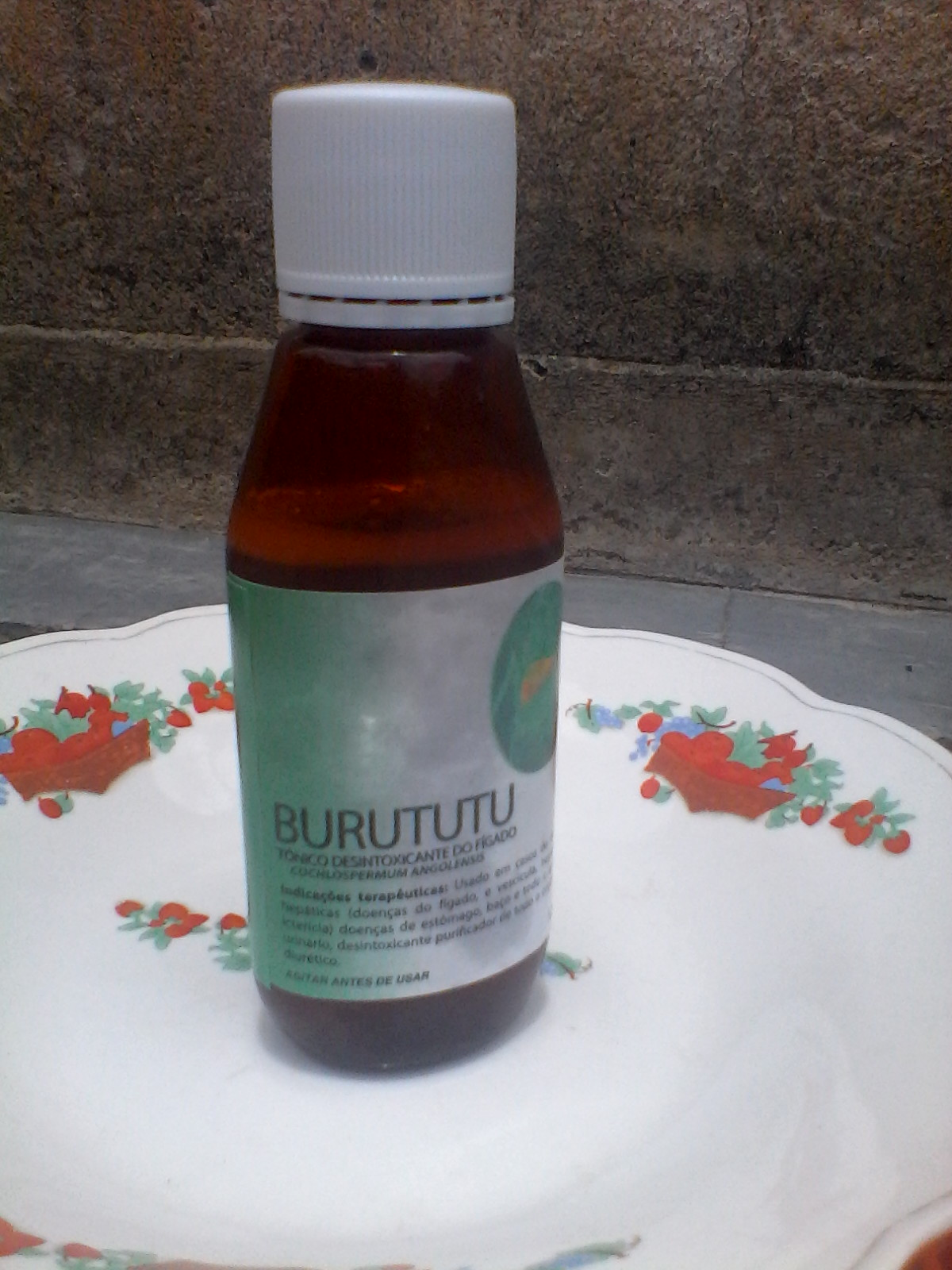
A bottle of syrup made from burututu roots, used to combat liver, stomach, spleen, and urinary tract diseases.

Cochlospermum angolense is a tree in the family Bixaceae. It is native to Angola and the Democratic Republic of the Congo. An extract of the tree's bark, called Borotutu in African traditional medicine, has been studied in mice for its potential to treat malaria.
