= W–Arly–Pendjari Complex =

UNESCO World Heritage Site
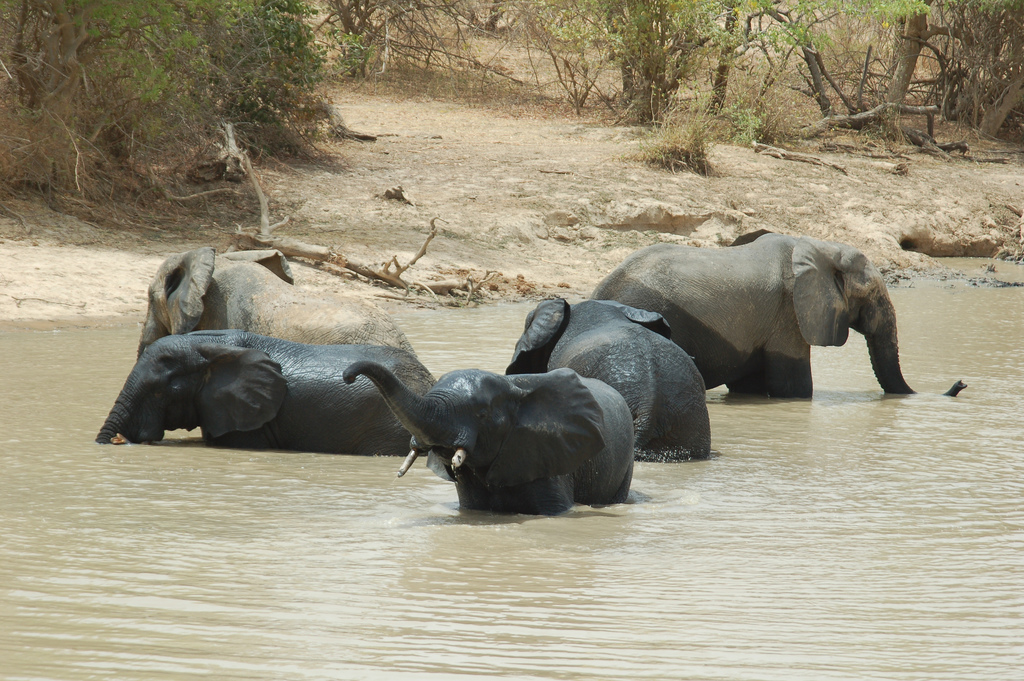
- African elephants in the Nigerien portion of W National Park

- Location within Niger
- Location: Benin, Burkina Faso and Niger
- Criteria: Natural: (ix),(x)
- Reference: 749
- Inscription: 2017 (41st Session)
- Area: 1,714,831 ha (4,237,440 acres)
- Buffer zone: 1,386,747 ha (3,426,730 acres)
- Coordinates: 12°20′53.57″N 2°21′23.62″E

W–Arly–Pendjari Complex, also known as the "WAP Complex", is a transboundary Natural UNESCO World Heritage Site in Benin, Burkina Faso and Niger covering:

- Arli National Park in Burkina Faso
- Pendjari National Park in Benin
- W National Park, shared by the three countries

Since 2005, the protected area is considered a Lion Conservation Unit and a potential lion stronghold.

== See also ==
- Arly-Singou
