= Singou Reserve =

- IUCN category IV (habitat/species management area)
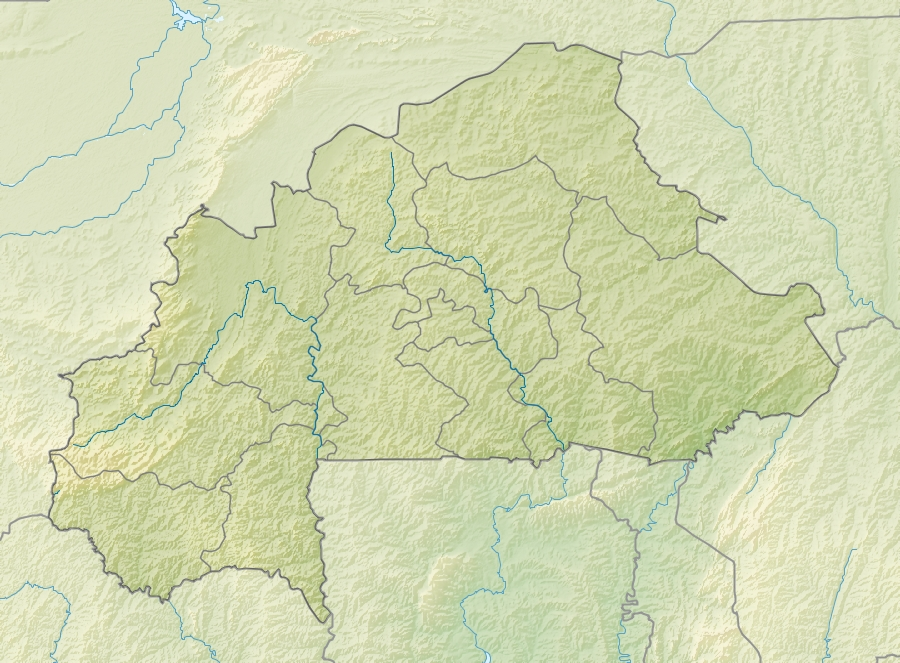
- Location within Burkina Faso
- Location: Gourma Province, Burkina Faso
- Coordinates: 11°38′20″N 1°00′00″E
- Area: 1,926 km^{2} (744 mi^{2})
- Established: 1955

Singou Reserve is one of three complete reserves in Burkina Faso. Established in 1955, it is located in Gourma Province and covers an area of 1,926 km^{2} (744 mi^{2}).

It is the country's largest reserve in terms of surface area.

It was created on August 3, 1955.

The reserve is part of a complex of protected areas with the Arli National Park, forming an important bird area.

== See also ==
- Arly-Singou
- Arli National Park
