= Shea nut and butter production in Burkina Faso =

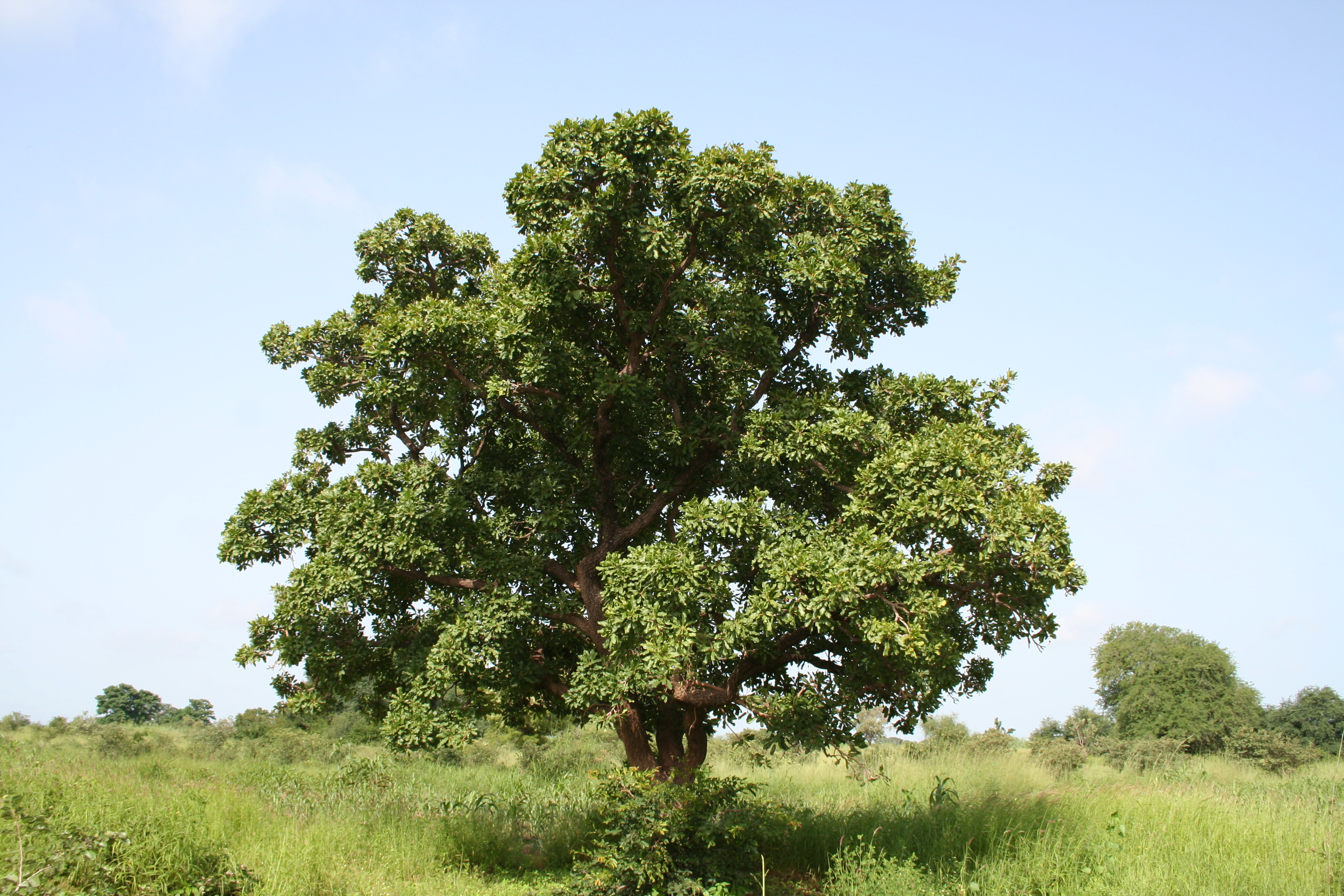
Vitellaria paradoxa, the shea tree

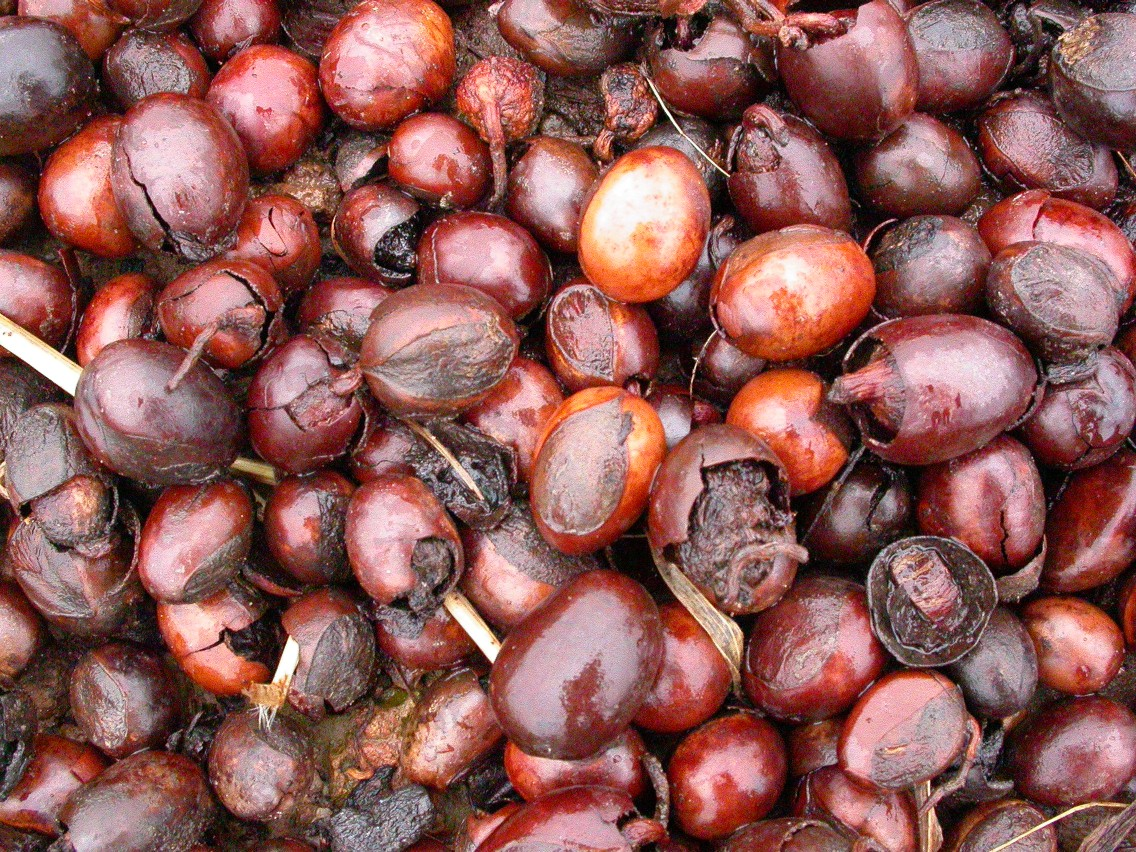
The shea nuts

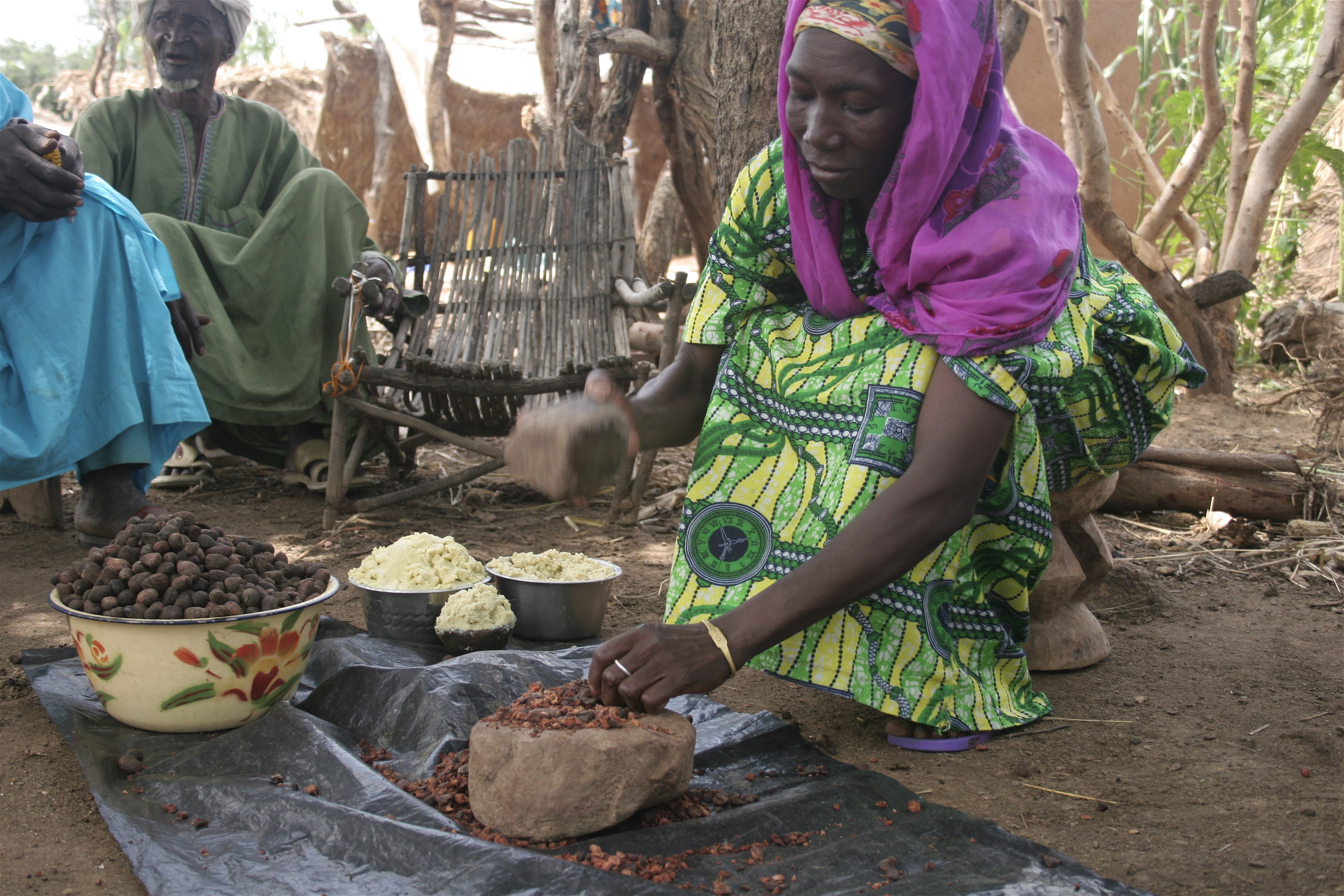
Shea nut processing in Burkina Faso

Vitellaria paradoxa (the shea tree) is extremely important in Burkina Faso. Termed "women's gold" by Burkinabé villagers, the nuts of shea tree can be collected and processed by crushing and grinding to yield shea butter, which is widely used in soap and in cosmetics as a moisturizer, salve, or lotion. Shea butter is also edible and may be used in food preparation; it is sometimes used in the manufacture of chocolate. The bark of the tree is also used as an ingredient in traditional medicines and the shell of nut is said to be able to repel mosquitoes and is also said to protect existing trees.

Shea nuts are important in the economy of Burkina Faso. It is the country's third most important export, after cotton and livestock. In 1997, an average tonne of unprocessed shea nuts sold domestically for CFA700,000 (US$980) and overseas for CFA1,000,000 (US$1400). The most important centres of shea butter production are in Sissili Province and Ziro Province.

== Sources ==
Shea butter is an oil extract from the kernel of the shea nut produce of the shea tree Vitellaria paradoxa (syn. Butyrospermum parkii, Butyrospermum paradoxum) (Sapotaceae). It grows profusely in the wild without any special nourishment and attention. Every part of this indigenous tree is found to be useful. Its distribution is exclusive to sub-Saharan West Africa in the savannas, particularly in Burkina Faso where it provides economic sustenance to rural women. Its distribution extends from Senegal to Ethiopia and Uganda over stretch of savanna nearly a thousand kilometers long covering an area of 1 million square km of wooded grassland (about 500 million trees) across 19 countries of the region.

The shea tree, though slow in its initial growth, has a useful fruit bearing life span of 15–20 years. Under indigenous farming system when clearing land for other agricultural activities, Shea trees are preserved and its exclusive plantation is restricted to avoid shading of other crops; however the operations of weeding and management of soil fertility adopted for other crops also facilitates shea tree growth. The shea fruit matures into the shea nut which has the shea kernel within it. The kernel is the source of the shea butter that is extracted through an arduous several hours of processing, over 22 steps, to produce 1 kg of the butter. In Burkina Faso, an impoverished country, it is the exclusive prerogative of rural women who number from 300,000 to 400,000. In the local Dioula language it is known as "Si" [shi].

The fruits are shaped like large plums and have smooth skin with an egg-shaped nut with the kernel that yields the fatty shea butter.

== Product ==
The product that is extracted as fat from the kernel of the shea nuts, which has five primary fatty acids namely, palmitic, stearic, oleic, linoleic, and arachidic; stearic and oleic acids constitute 85–90% of the fatty acids. Though a fat, it is not extracted in a fluid state like other oils, but is processed in the form of a white, odourless, and nearly tasteless creamy paste or similar to firm butter. The shea butter produced in the Mossi plateau region of Burkina Faso has higher average stearic acid percentage and is thus harder than the shea butter from other West African regions; this is due to scientific inference that the phenolic content in shea kernels varies from region to region.

== Quality ==
The quality of shea nuts and butter, both of which are also exported in large quantities from Burkina Faso, are basically dependent upon post harvest processing; in this process parboiling of shea nuts is carried out at the beginning of the season as it the eliminates germination and helps in faster drying. Better quality is obtained by sun-drying of the shea nut since smoking the nuts over a fire contaminates it with hydrocarbons.

== Uses ==
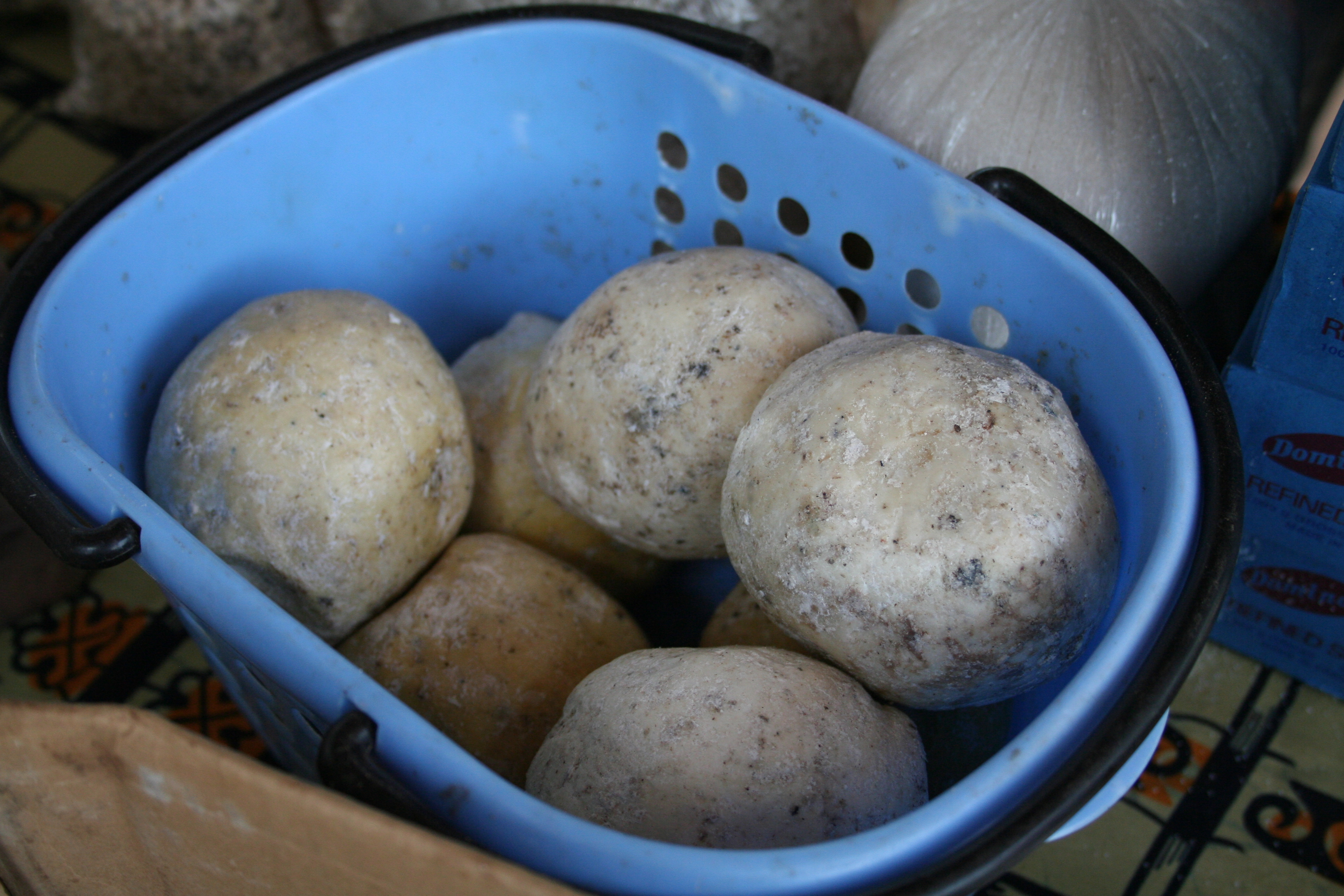
Shea soap

The shea butter which is extracted from the shea nuts that is rich in vitamins and minerals, is vital to daily existence of the people as it is used to enhance the "taste, texture, and digestibility of the major regional dishes" as cooking medium. Other activities related to shea butter that enhances the financial income of the impoverished people consists of use as ingredient to make cosmetics, chocolates (as substitute for cocoa butter) pharmaceutical applications and soap. Soap manufacturers use it typically in small amounts (5–7% of the oils in the recipe) as it has the property of leaving a small amount of oil in the soap. Other uses include as a waterproofing wax, for hairdressing and for candle-making. Its export potential is on account of its industrial production in Europe for separation into stearin for use with "cocoa butter equivalents or improvers (CBEs/CBIs) and margarines, and an oil fraction used as a low-value base for margarines and as a component of animal feeds." Its use is also noted in traditional African percussion instruments to increase the durability of wood (such as carved djembe shells), dried calabash gourds, and leather tuning straps.

=== Medicinal uses ===
Bark of the tree is used to cure ailments in skin treatment in children and treat minor scratches and cuts. Shea unsaponifiables are used as anti-inflammatory treatment for arthritis and a topical treatment for eczema and other skin conditions including herpes lesions. A patented product "nutraceutical" is a shea product that has been developed for lowering cholesterol in humans. Its use as a base for medicinal ointments, has been claimed to have anti-inflammatory, emollient and humectant properties.

== Exports ==
As an export commodity, the shea nuts, unprocessed shea kernels and processed shea butter, have been important, and in 2000 accounted as Burkina Faso's third most important export; the first two export products were cotton and livestock. Export to Europe for use in manufacture of chocolates was even better in 1970 and 1980s, and amounted to 22,000 tonnes in 1990. However, economic policies of restructuring changed this picture and caused decline in the trade. This created the need for a revisiting of the policies and resulted in participation of the NGOs such the Canadian Centre for International Studies and Cooperation for financial and technical assistance, bilateral donors, Taiwan, the West African Office of the United Nations Development Fund for Women (UNIFEM), and many others.

== Women's empowerment ==
In Burkina Faso, women have traditionally played a central role in the extraction of shea butter, from the stage of collection of shea nuts to its final processing into shea butter. However, the improved economic conditions of the shea trade had not permeated to benefit them and as result their participation had remained restricted to their local markets, while the men had garnered the large export market to Europe for the cosmetic industry; the wide disparity in returns to the local women is reflected in the fact that a tonne of unprocessed shea nuts which sold in 1997 locally for CFA 700,000 (US$980) and exported at CFA 1,000,000 (US$1400) sold at CFA 1,480,000 (US$2072) once processed into shea butter; a kilo of butter which sold locally at only a paltry equivalent of 60 cents to the women was worth two to three times as much in the international market. The export earnings were boosted due to shea butter’s use in cosmetics (for lotions, creams, soaps and other products) by well-known firms such as L'Oréal, The Body Shop and L'Occitane en Provence. These exports were monitored by UNIFEM to ensure benefits flowed directly to the local women involved in the industry; the L'Occitane purchase was engineered directly, bypassing middlemen, through the Union des groupements Kiswendsida (UGK), a network of more than 100 shea groups set up in Burkina Faso. As a result, shea butter exports for L'Occitane alone recorded an increase from 60 tonnes in 2001 to 90 tonnes in 2002, with greater share of the spoils reaching the women who produced it. The women were also trained in the trade to produce better quality product, as quality had declined in the recent past. This women empowerment process has imparted "a certain sense of self-respect among the workers. It has also helped the women producers earn the respect of their family and the right to speak out in the community."

== See also ==
- Le Beurre et l'argent du beurre, a 2007 film about shea butter production in the country
- Shea Yeleen, a social enterprise that empowers and trains women-owned shea butter cooperatives
