= Borututu =

Medicinal tree bark

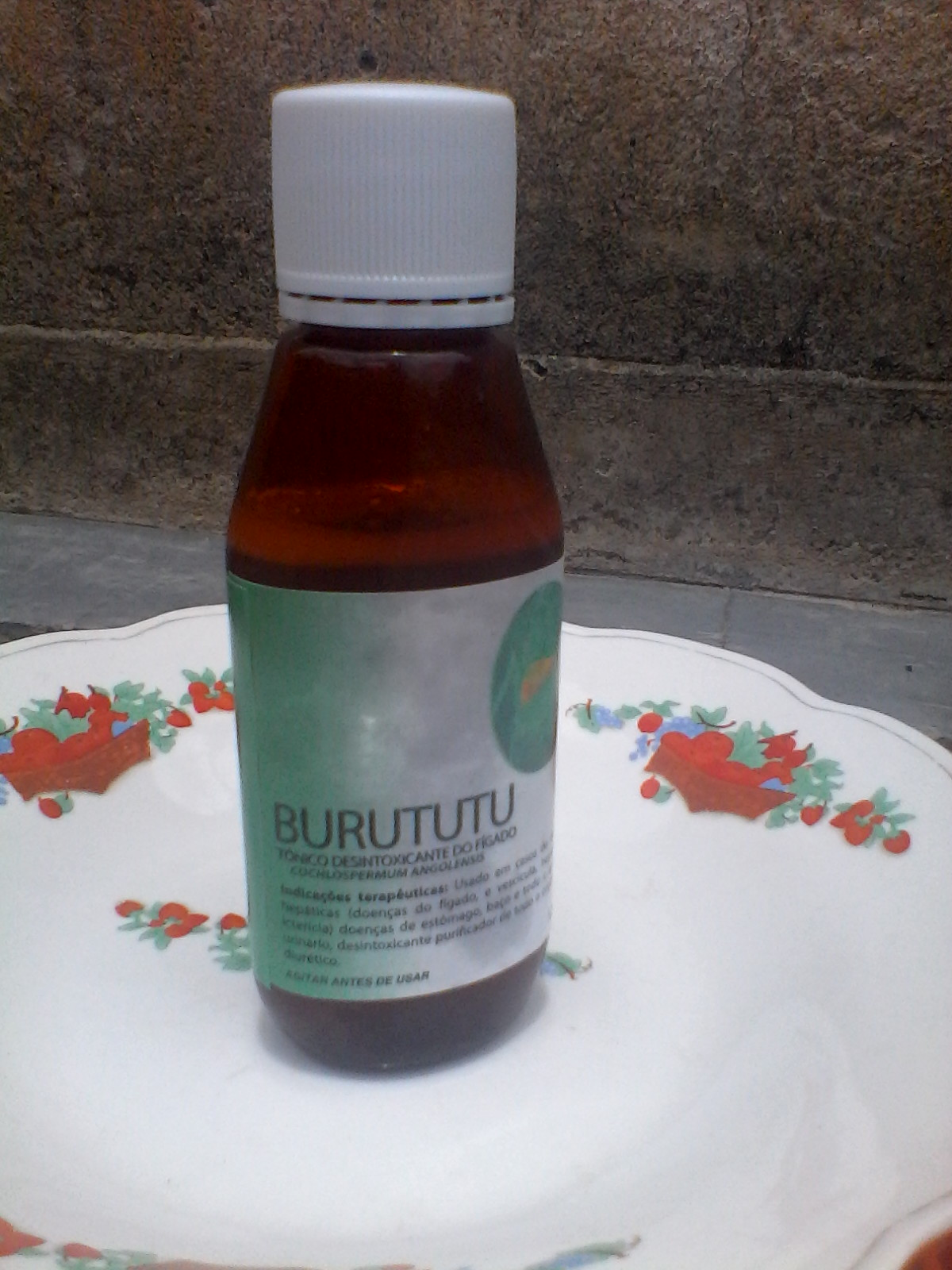
Syrup preparation made from borututu

Borotutu is traditional medicine made from the African tree Cochlospermum angolense. It is widespread in parts of Angola, where it is known as mburututu in the Chokwe and Kimbundu languages.

== Uses ==
Borututu bark is claimed to have hepatic healing properties and a general cleansing effect. Borotutu bark pills and herbal teas are sold in health stores. The bark showed activity against the rodent malaria parasite Plasmodium berghei in laboratory tests.

In Ghana, where the bark locally known as paajawu, it is added to Shea Butter during the boiling process for a vibrant yellow coloring.
