= Logoniégué Forest =

Forest reserve in Burkina Faso

Coordinates: 9.80447°N 4.54173°W

- IUCN category IV (habitat/species management area)
- Interactive map of Logoniégué Forest
- Location: Burkina Faso
- Area: km²

Logoniégué Forest is a protected forest in Burkina Faso. It is located in Comoé Province, in the western portion of the country, near the border with Ivory Coast. It became a protected area in 1955, and has been merged with the nearby Diéfoula Forest to form the Forêt Classée et Réserve Partielle de Faune de la Comoé-Léraba or AGEREF/CL. It is part of a connected cross-border protected area with the Ivorian Warigué protected area and Comoé National Park.

The forest is home to white-naped mangabeys, an endangered Old World monkey.
