= Diéfoula Forest =

Protected forest in Burkina Faso

- IUCN category IV (habitat/species management area)
- Location: Burkina Faso
- Area: km²

Diéfoula Forest is a protected forest in Burkina Faso. It is located in Comoé Province in the western portion of the country, near the border with Ivory Coast. It became a protected area in 1937, and has been merged with the nearby Logoniégué Forest to form the Forêt Classée et Réserve Partielle de Faune de la Comoé-Léraba or AGEREF/CL. It is part of a connected cross-border protected area with the Ivorian Warigué protected area and Comoé National Park.

The forest is home to white-naped mangabeys, an endangered Old World monkey.

The dominant tree species are Daniellia olivieri, Isoberlinia doka, Pterocarpus erinaceus and Khaya senegalensis. The average annual rainfall is about 1,300 mm.
