= Arly-Singou =

Large ecosystem in Burkina Faso

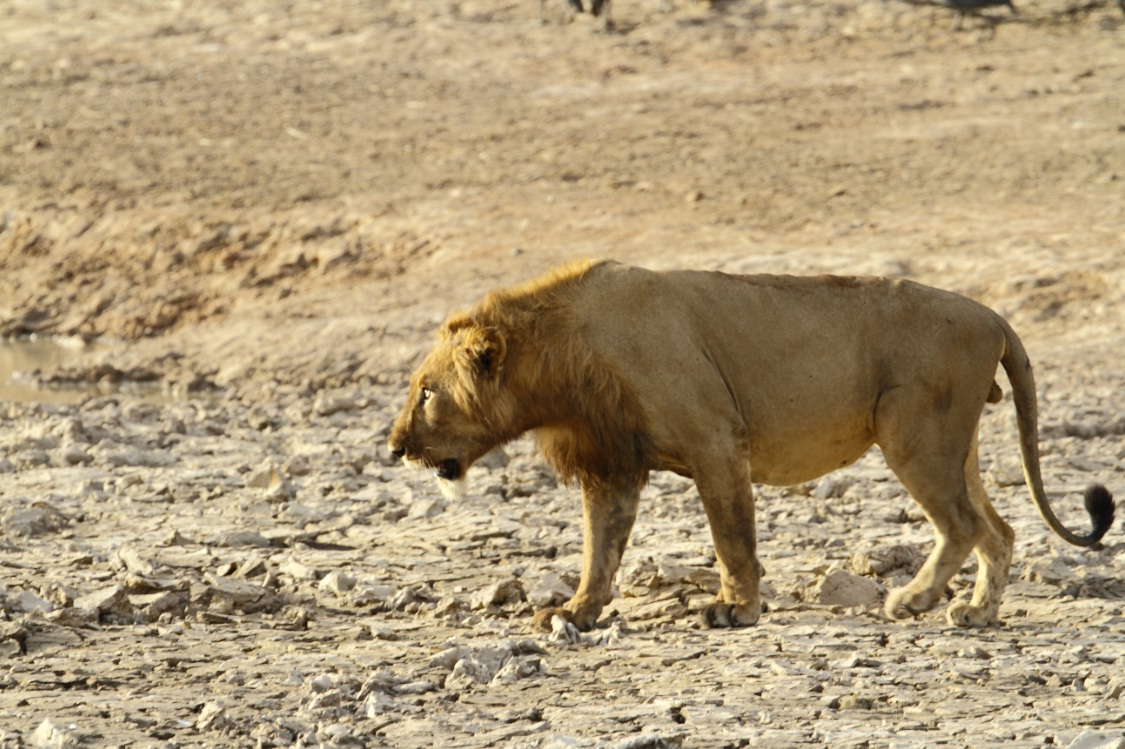
- Male West African lion in Pendjari National Park
- Interactive map of Arly-Singou
- Location: Burkina Faso
- Nearest city: Diapaga
- Coordinates: 11°35′N 1°28′E

Arly-Singou is a 6,388 km^{2} (2,466 sq mi) large ecosystem in Burkina Faso. It encompasses the Arli National Park and the Singou Reserve. It is considered to comprise part of the most significant and important savanna woodland wildlife areas still existing in West Africa.

== Fauna and history ==
In 1980, aerial counts revealed that the largest antelope population in the entire region inhabited the Arly-Singou complex. More recent studies indicate that the antelope population has been sustained by the end of the 20th century.

In 2003, herds of African elephant, buffalo, roan antelope, western hartebeest, oribi, Grimm's duiker, Buffon's kob, bushbuck, waterbuck, bohor reedbuck and groups of warthog, anubis baboon and Patas monkey were recorded in Arly-Singou during an aerial survey. In 2002, it was estimated that between 364 and 444 lions reside in Arly-Singou, based on information by local people. But census data were not available. In 2004, census data were still not available. Based on information by wildlife researchers, it was estimated that 50 to 150 lions reside in Arly-Singou.

Previously the endangered painted hunting dog, Lycaon pictus, occurred in Burkina Faso within the Arly-Singou ecosystem, but, although last sightings were made in Arli National Park, the species is considered extirpated throughout Burkina Faso.

The Arly-Singou project is considered to have taken a somewhat new initiative in structure, in regard to wildlife management undertakings funded by the government in the area. However, the project also permits private operators to share and hold authority of the area's management, in a bid to take advantage of the benefits of greater external funds, from these operators.

== See also ==
- W-Arly-Pendjari Complex
