= Arli National Park =

National park in Burkina Faso

- IUCN category IV (habitat/species management area)
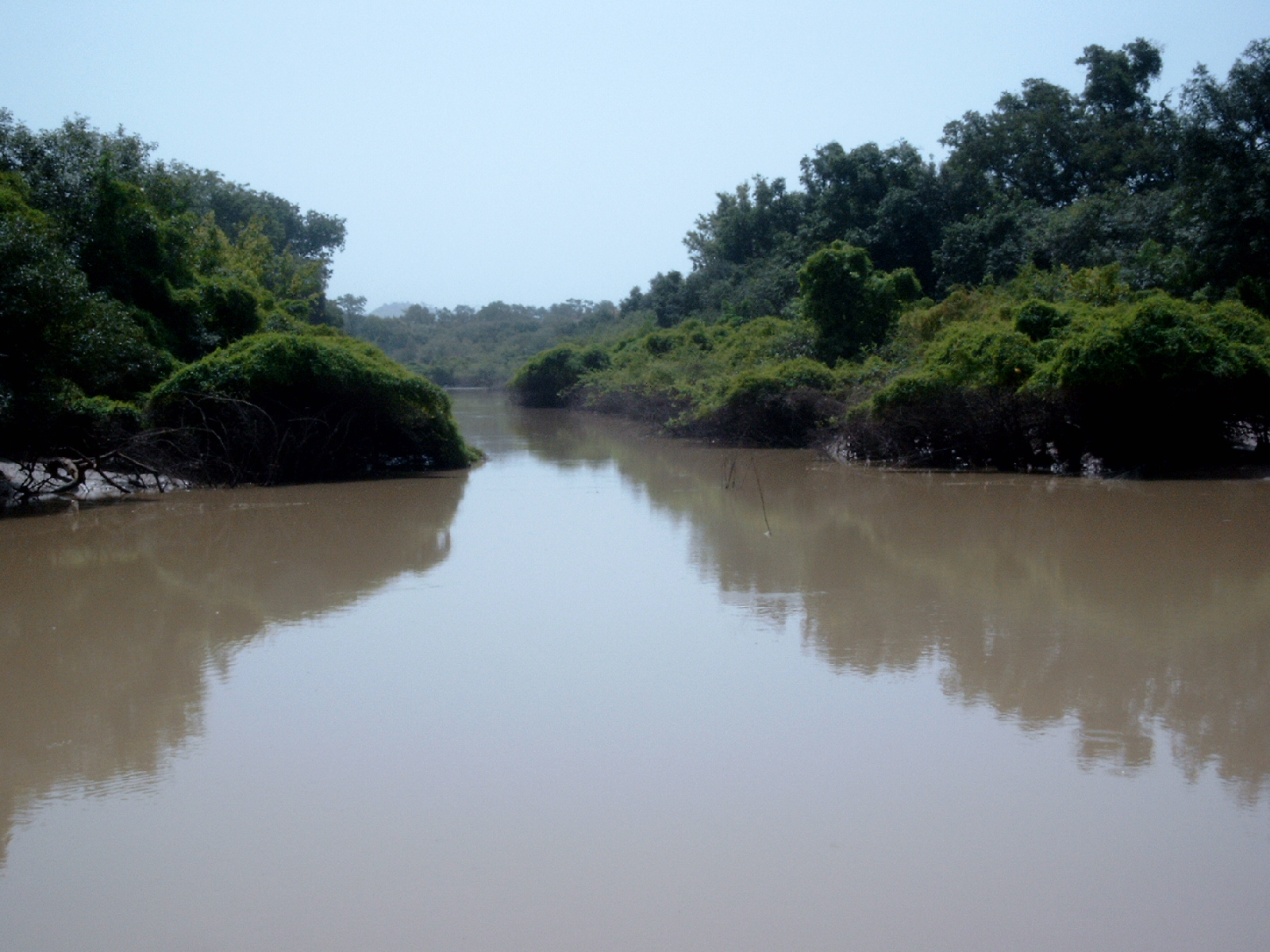
- Arli National Park with view on the river Arli

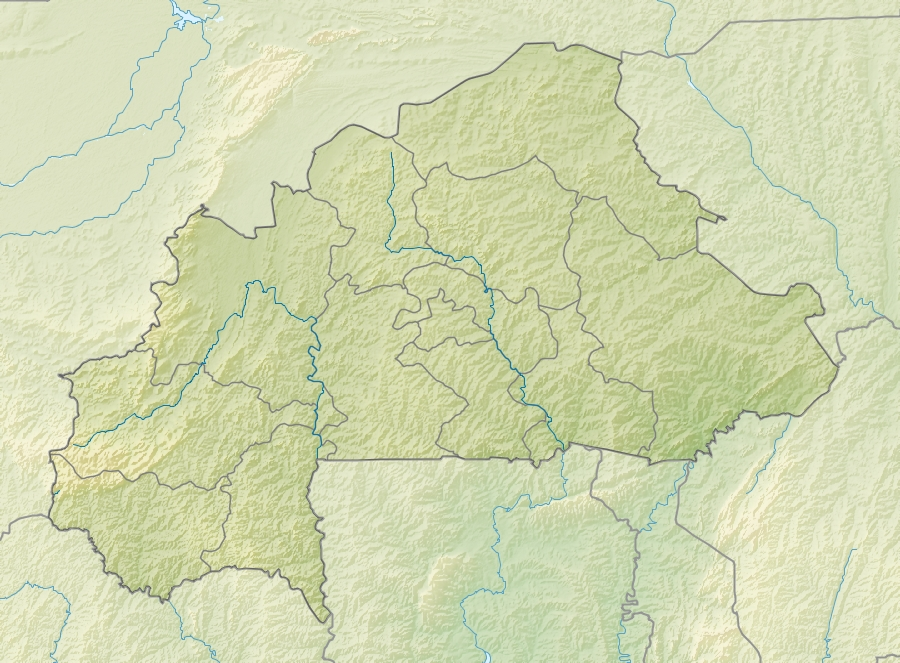
- Location within Burkina Faso
- Location: Burkina Faso
- Nearest city: Diapaga
- Coordinates: 11°35′N 1°28′E
- Area: 760 km^{2} (290 sq mi)
- Established: 1954

UNESCO World Heritage Site
- Part of: Burkinabé part of W-Arly-Pendjari Complex
- Criteria: Natural: (ix), (x)
- Reference: 749bis-003
- Inscription: 1996 (20th Session)
- Extensions: 2017

Ramsar Wetland
- Official name: Parc National d'Arly
- Designated: 7 October 2009
- Reference no.: 1884
- +

Arli National Park, often called Arly, is a national park located in Tapoa Province, southeastern Burkina Faso. It adjoins Benin's Pendjari National Park in the south and the Singou Reserve in the west.

== Geography and history ==
IUCN Protected Areas of the WAP Complex

The park covers 760 km^{2} (290 sq mi) with a wide variety of habitats, ranging from the gallery forests of the Arli and Pendjari rivers to savanna woodland and sandstone hills of the Gobnangou chain. It is home to around 200 African elephants, 200 hippos and 100 lions. There are also buffaloes, baboons, red and green monkeys, warthogs, and various antelopes, such as the western hartebeest and roan antelope. There are also bushbucks, duikers and waterbuck.

The park can be accessed via the N19 highway via Diapaga (in the dry season also via Pama). Arli National Park has several pools, such as Tounga where there is a waterhole and two pools which are often visited by up to twenty hippos.

The park was earlier a habitat for the West African wild dog (Lycaon pictus manguensis), although this canid is likely extirpated from the local area due to an expanding human population, and lack of national protection.

The Arly reserve is part of a complex of protected areas with the Singou reserve, forming an important bird area.

Management of the park has been delegated to the Burkinabe NGO NATURAMA since 1993.

The reserve has been designated a Ramsar site since 2009 for the international importance of its wetlands.

== See also ==
- Arly-Singou
- W National Park
