= Shea Yeleen =

U.S.-based nonprofit organization

- Formation: 2005
- Type: Social enterprise, natural beauty care
- Key people: Rahama Wright (President & CEO)
- Website: sheayeleen.com

Shea Yeleen is a social enterprise that includes a 501(c)(3) nonprofit and a commercial entity that sells "high-quality, unrefined shea butter products." The mission of the organization is "to promote sustainable economic development in rural sub-Saharan Africa, empower and train women-owned shea butter cooperatives, and educate consumers in the U.S. about natural beauty care products and fair trade.

Rahama Wright, a former Peace Corps volunteer in Mali, founded Shea Yeleen in 2005 and serves as the organization's President and CEO.

== Founding ==
Wright, a first-generation Ghanaian American, first discovered shea butter production while an intern at the U.S. Embassy in Ouagadougou, Burkina Faso, in 2002. Later that year, Wright became a Peace Corps volunteer in Mali, where she "supported the creation of the first shea butter cooperative in the village of Dio."

Through her experiences in these countries, Wright made two key observations that would inspire her work. First, she saw that "women could not take basic steps to improve their families’ health and nutrition because they lack independent income." Second, she noted that "women in Mali and more than a dozen African countries are key players in the production of shea butter — and that shea butter is a cosmetic hit in developed countries."

In 2005, Wright applied these lessons to found Shea Yeleen, which has worked with women in cooperatives in Ghana, Burkina Faso and Mali. In March 2012, Shea Yeleen launched a for-profit LLC to market and sell their fair trade shea butter beauty care line.

== Business model and products ==
Shea Yeleen "promotes empowerment among women in rural West Africa by teaching them sustainable economic development through organizing and training women-owned cooperatives to produce, market, and sell high quality shea butter themselves." Shea Yeleen also works to ensure "that the profits from their products go back to the female-owned cooperatives that are cultivating and developing the products."

Shea butter products sold by Shea Yeleen include body butter, black soap, body balms, lip balms and handmade soaps.

Shea Yeleen is a member of the Fair Trade Federation and YouthTrade.

== Accolades ==
For her work at Shea Yeleen, Wright was one of only 80 women selected among more than 3,000 female applicants for the "O-White House Leadership Project" contest in 2008.

In 2011, Shea Yeleen was selected to represent the Peace Corps theme at the Smithsonian Folklife Festival on the National Mall in Washington, D.C.
