= Shea butter =

Fat from the nut of the African shea tree

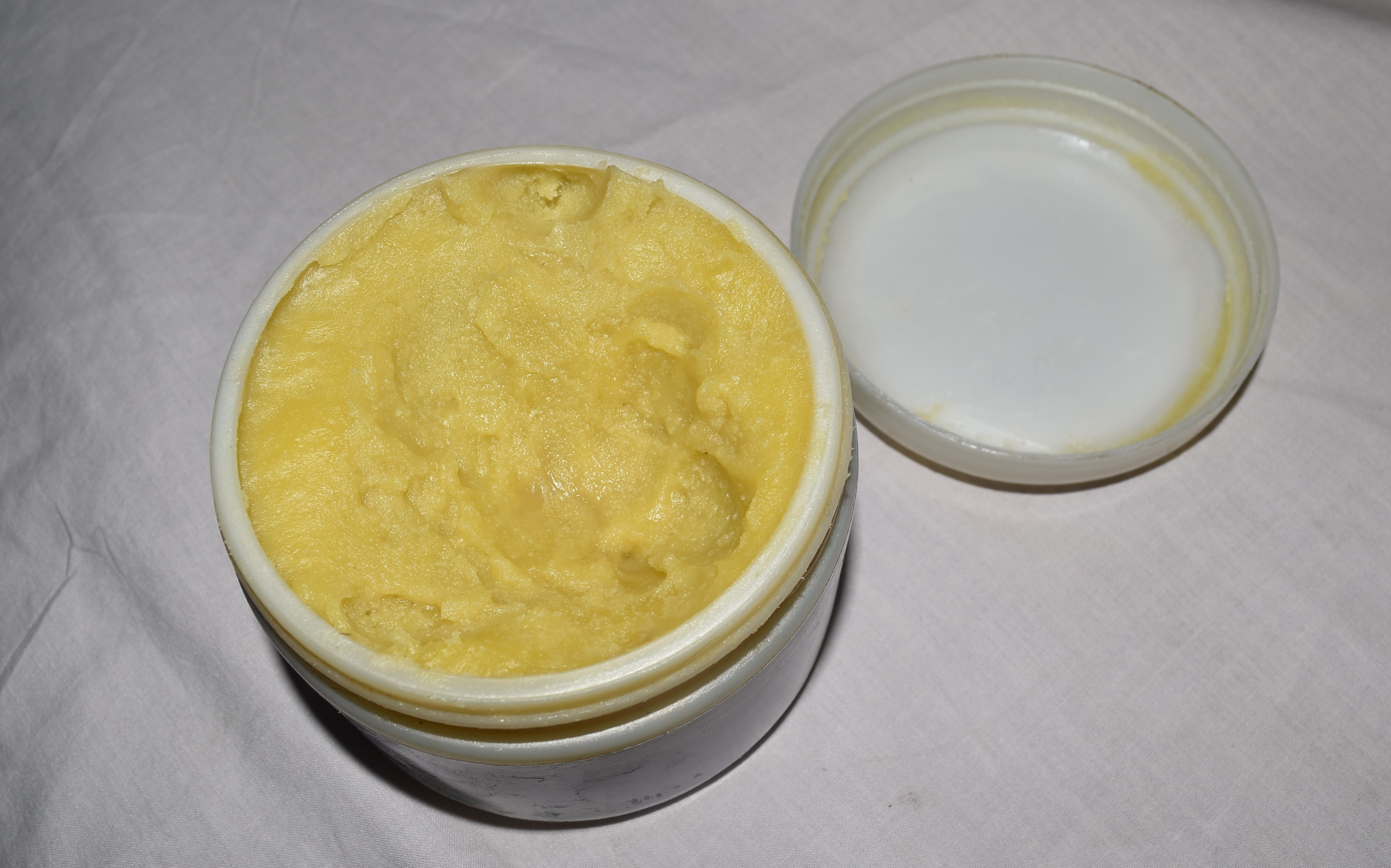
A container of shea butter as sold in Benin

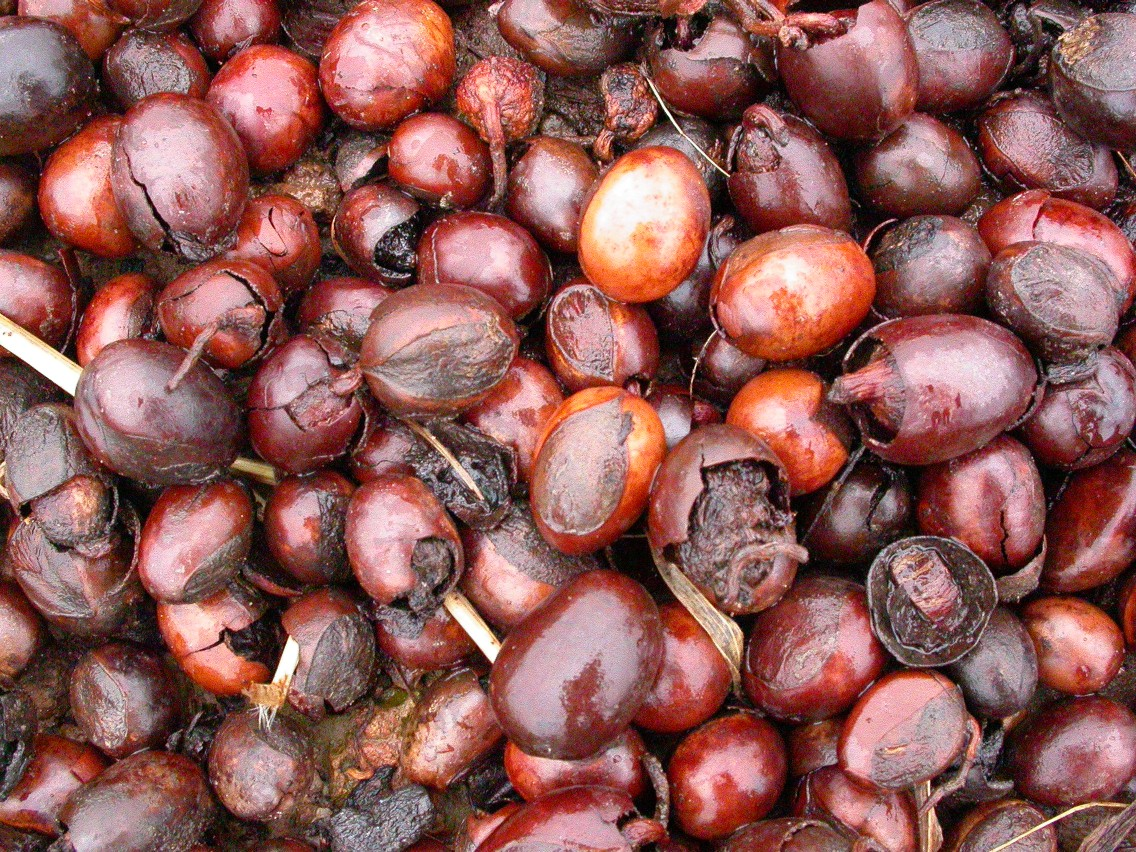
Seeds of a shea tree—raw materials for oil production

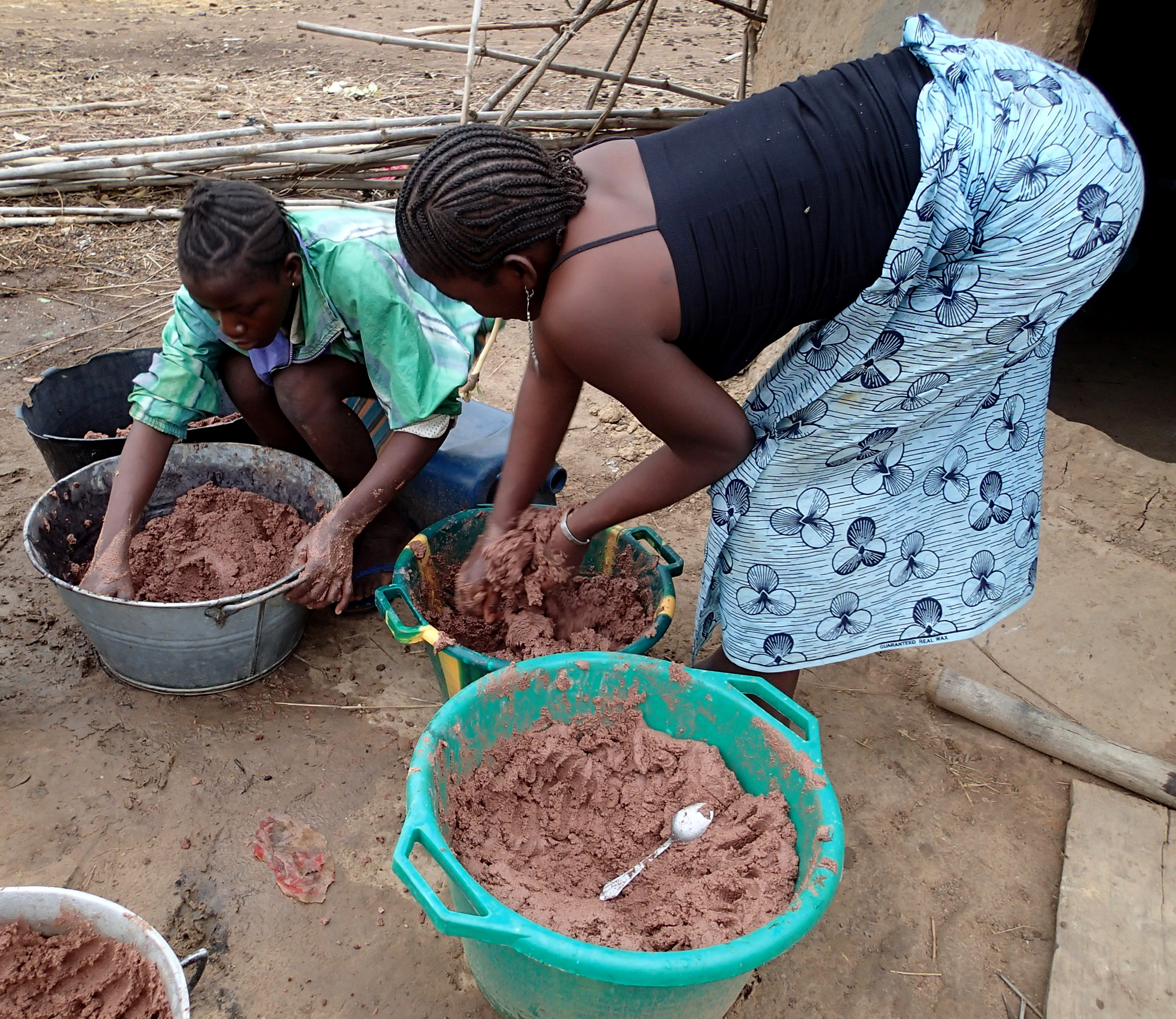
Traditional preparation of shea butter in Mali

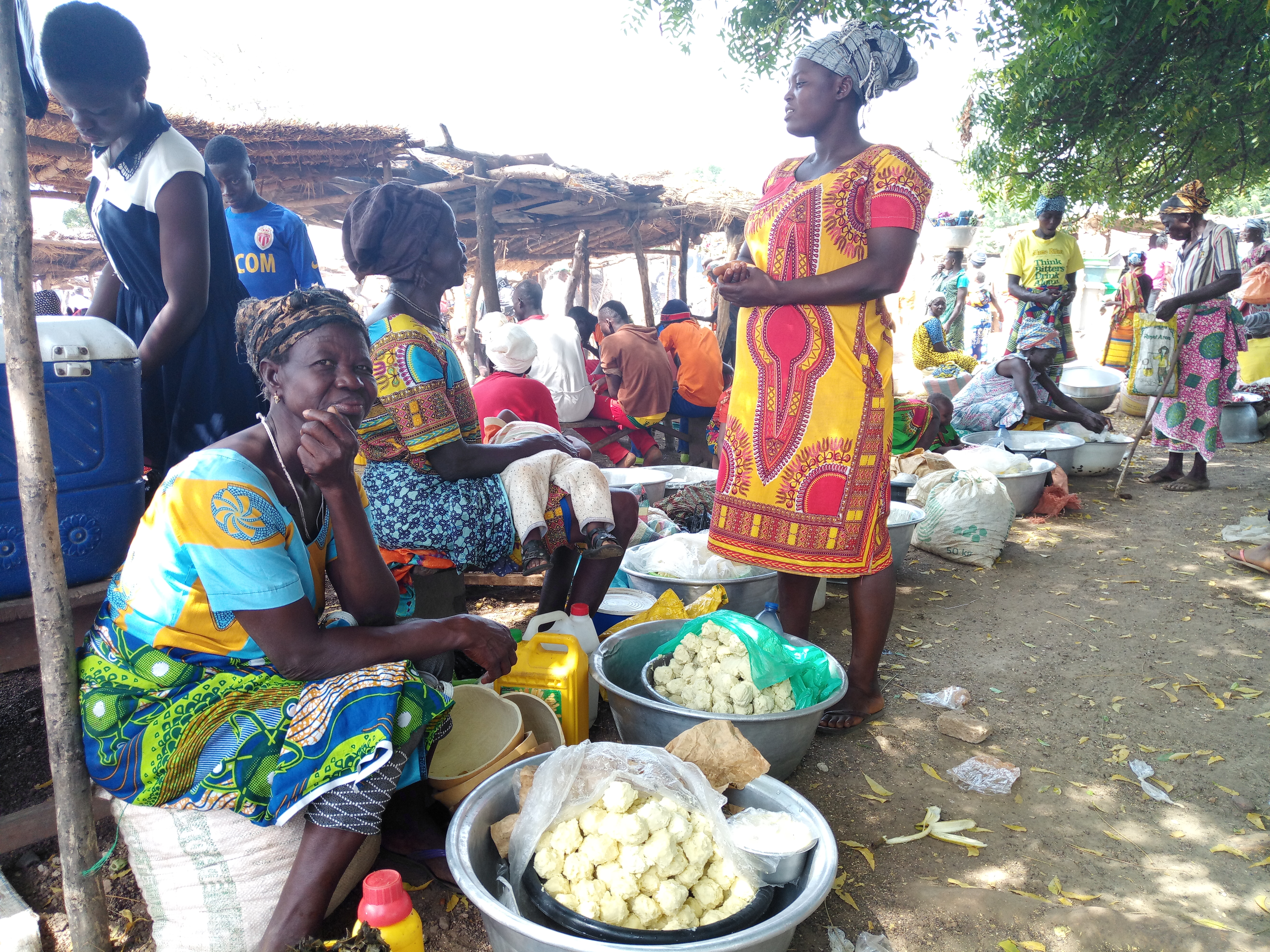
Wala women selling shea butter in Ghana

Shea butter (/ʃiː/ SHEE, /ˈʃiːə/ SHEE-ə, or /ʃeɪ/ SHAY; Bambara: ߛߌ߮ߕߎߟߎ, romanized: sìtulu) is a fat (triglyceride; mainly oleic acid and stearic acid) extracted from the nut of the African shea tree (Vitellaria paradoxa). It is ivory in color when raw and commonly dyed yellow with borututu root or palm oil. It is widely used in cosmetics as a moisturizer or lotion. It is edible and is used in food preparation in some African countries. It is occasionally mixed with other oils as a substitute for cocoa butter, although the taste is noticeably different.

The English word "shea" comes from sǐ, the tree's name in Bambara. It is known by many local names, such as kpakahili in the Dagbani language, taama in the Wali language, nkuto in Twi, kaɗe or kaɗanya in Hausa, òkwùmá in the Igbo language, òrí in the Yoruba language, and karité in the Wolof language of Senegal. It is also known as Moo-yaa in the Acholi language.

== History ==
The common name is shísu ߛ߭ߌ߭ߛߎ (lit. 'shea tree') in the Bambara language of Mali. This is the origin of the English word, one pronunciation of which rhymes with "tea" /ʃiː/, although the pronunciation /ʃeɪ/ (rhyming with "day") is common, and is listed second in major dictionaries. The tree is called ghariti in the Wolof language of Senegal, which is the origin of the French name of the tree and the butter, karité.

The shea tree grows naturally in the wild in the dry savannah belt of West Africa from Senegal in the west to Sudan in the east, and onto the foothills of the Ethiopian highlands. It occurs in 21 countries across the African continent, namely Benin, Burkina Faso, Cameroon, Central African Republic, Chad, Ethiopia, Eritrea, Ghana, Guinea Bissau, Ivory Coast, Mali, Niger, Nigeria, Senegal, Sierra Leone, South Sudan, Sudan,Togo, Uganda, Democratic Republic of the Congo, Kenya and Guinea.

A testa found at the site of the medieval village of Saouga is evidence of shea butter production by the 14th century. The butter was being imported into Britain by 1846.

Production of karite nuts

Karite nut yield

== Composition ==
=== Fatty acids ===
Shea butter is composed of five principal fatty acids: palmitic, stearic, oleic, linoleic, and arachidic. About 85 to 90% of the fatty acid composition is stearic and oleic acids. The relative proportion of these two fatty acids affects shea butter consistency. The stearic acid gives it a solid consistency, while the oleic acid influences how soft or hard the shea butter is, depending on ambient temperature.

The proportions of stearic and oleic acids in the shea kernels and butter differ across the distribution range of the species. Ugandan shea butter has consistently high oleic acid content, and is liquid at warm ambient temperatures. It fractionizes into liquid and solid phases, and is the source of liquid shea oil. The fatty acid proportion of West African shea butter is much more variable than Ugandan shea butter, with an oleic content of 37 to 55%. Variability can be high even locally, and a tree that produces hard butter can grow with one that produces soft butter.

Nuts are gathered from a wide area for local production so shea butter consistency is determined by the average fatty acid profile of the population. Within West Africa shea butter from the Mossi Plateau region of Burkina Faso has a higher average stearic acid content so is usually harder than shea butter from other West African regions.

Fatty Acid	Mean	Min	Max
16:0 Palmitic	4.0	2.6	8.4
18:0 Stearic	41.5	25.6	50.2
18:1 Oleic	46.4	37.1	62.1
18:2 Linoleic	6.6	0.6	10.8
20:0 Arachidic	1.3	0.0	3.5

=== Phenolics ===
A 2014 review characterized and quantified phenolic compounds in shea butter, identifying 10 phenolic compounds, eight of which are catechins. This study also found that the overall concentration and relative percentages of different phenolic content in shea kernels varied from region to region. The authors hypothesized that the overall concentration of phenols in shea kernels is linked to the level of environmental stress that the trees endure.

== Uses ==
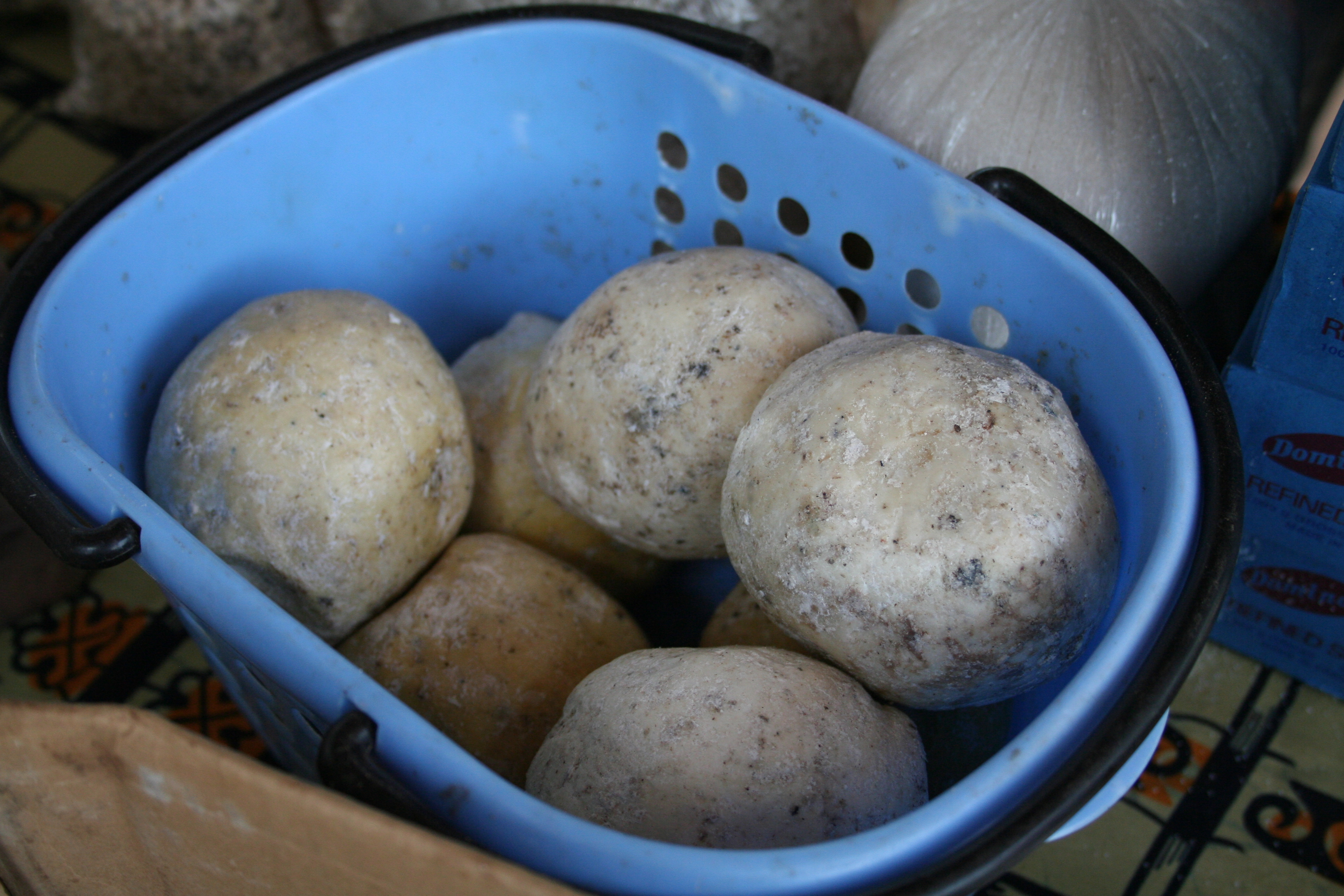
Shea butter soap

Shea butter is mainly used in the cosmetics industry as an emollient and skin conditioner.

In some African countries, such as Benin, shea butter is used as a cooking oil,

=== Classification ===
The United States Agency for International Development and other companies have suggested a classification system for shea butter, separating it into five grades:

- A (raw or unrefined, extracted using water)
- B (refined)
- C (highly refined and extracted with solvents such as hexane)
- D (lowest uncontaminated grade)
- E (with contaminants)

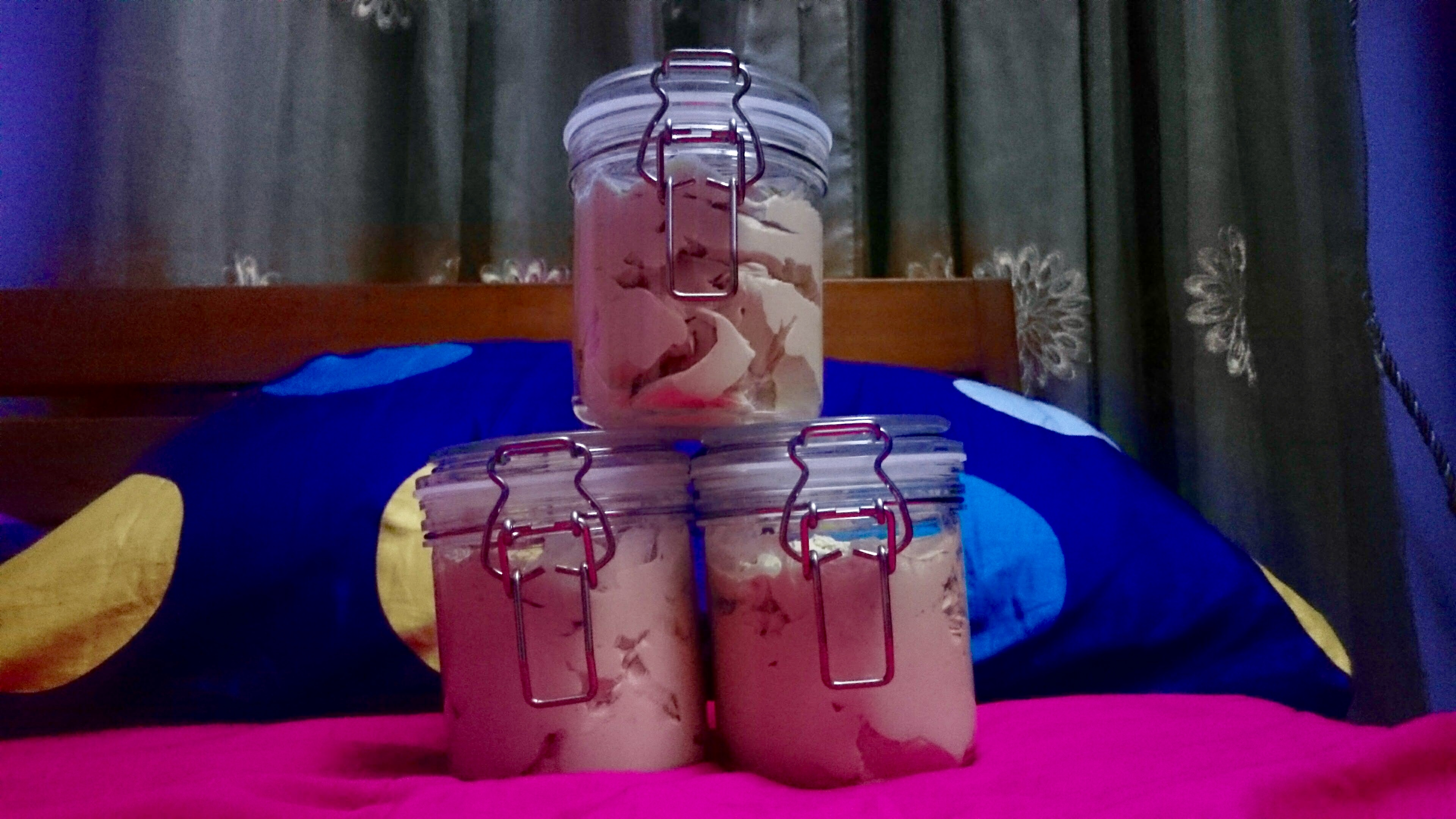
Whipped shea butter

Commercial grades are A, B, and C. The color of raw (grade A) butter ranges from cream (like whipped butter) to grayish yellow. It has a nutty aroma which is removed in the other grades. Grade C is pure white. While the level of vitamin content can be affected by refining, up to 95% of vitamin content can be removed from refined grades (i.e., grade C) of shea butter while reducing contamination levels to undetectable levels.

== See also ==
- African black soap, a West African soap traditionally prepared with shea butter.
- Shea nut and butter production in Burkina Faso
- Shea Yeleen, a social enterprise that trains women-owned shea butter cooperatives.
