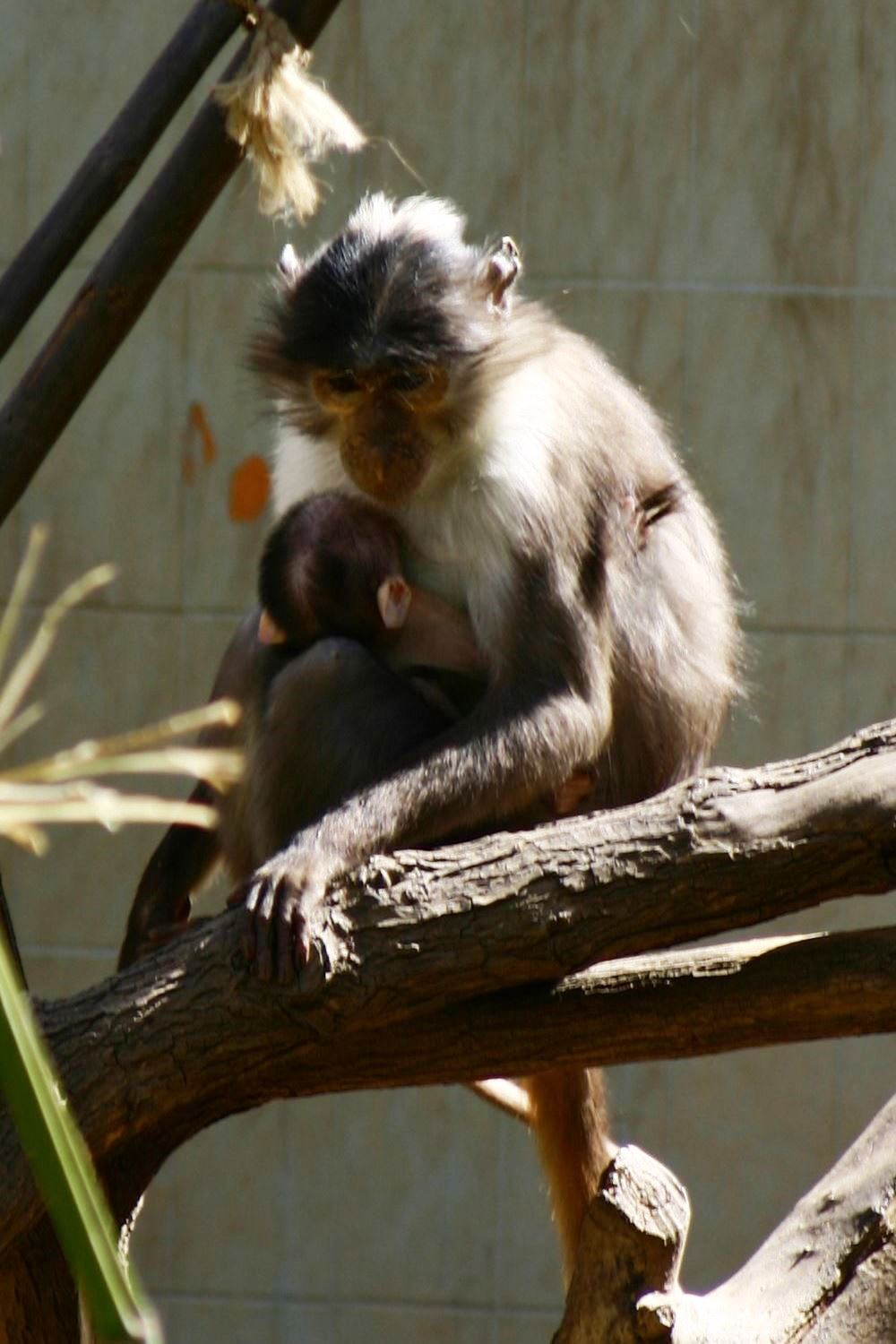
- At Barcelona Zoo, Barcelona

Conservation status
- Endangered (IUCN 3.1)

Scientific classification
- Kingdom: Animalia
- Phylum: Chordata
- Class: Mammalia
- Order: Primates
- Suborder: Haplorhini
- Infraorder: Simiiformes
- Family: Cercopithecidae
- Genus: Cercocebus
- Species: C. lunulatus

Binomial name
- Cercocebus lunulatus (Temminck, 1853)
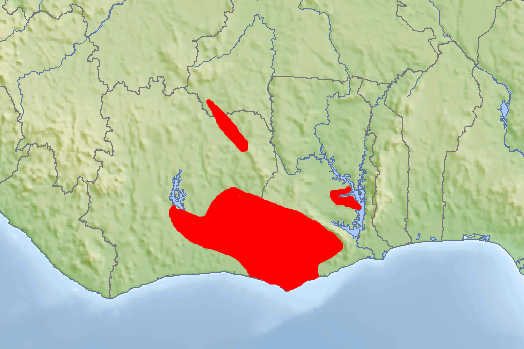

Synonyms
- Cercocebus atys lunulatus Temminck, 1853; Cercopithecus lunnulatus Temminck, 1853

= White-naped mangabey =

Species of mammal

The white-naped mangabey (Cercocebus lunulatus) is a species of Old World monkey in the subfamily Cercopithecinae. The species is found in the forest of Burkina Faso, Ghana and Ivory Coast. The species population has been declining due to deforestation and hunting and has thus been put as an endangered species by the International Union for Conservation of Nature. The species was once considered a subspecies of the sooty mangabey but is now a separate species.
