= Burkina Faso =

Country in West Africa

- Flag Coat of arms
- Motto: "La Patrie ou la Mort, Nous Vaincrons"; "Homeland or Death, we will overcome"
- Anthem: Ditanyè
- Capital and largest city: Ouagadougou; 12°22′N 1°32′W
- Official languages: Mooré; Dyula; Fula; Bissa
- Working languages: English; French
- Ethnic groups (2010 est.): 52% Mossi; 8.4% Fula; 7% Gurma; 4.9% Bobo; 4.6% Gurunsi; 4.5% Senufo; 3.7% Bissa; 2.4% Lobi; 2.3% Dagara; 1.9% Tuareg; 0.8% Dyula; 7.5% other
- Religion (2019 census): 63.8% Islam; 26.3% Christianity; 20.1% Catholicism; 6.2% Protestantism; 9% Animism; 0.7% irreligion
- Demonym: Burkinabe
- Government: Unitary semi-presidential republic under a military junta
  - President of the Patriotic Movement for Safeguard and Restoration: Ibrahim Traoré
  - President: Ibrahim Traoré (interim)
  - Prime Minister: Jean Emmanuel Ouédraogo (interim)
- Legislature: National Assembly

History
  - Republic of Upper Volta proclaimed: 11 December 1958
  - Independence from France: 5 August 1960
  - 1966 Upper Voltan coup d'état: 3 January 1966
  - 2014 Burkina Faso uprising: 28 October – 3 November 2014
  - Jan 2022 Burkina Faso coup d'état: 23–24 January 2022
  - Sep 2022 Burkina Faso coup d'état: 30 September 2022

Area
  - Total: 274,223 km^{2} (105,878 sq mi) (74th)
  - Water (%): 0.148%

Population
  - 2023 estimate: ▲22,489,126 (58th)
  - Density: 86/km^{2} (222.7/sq mi) (126th)
- GDP (PPP): 2026 estimate
  - Total: ▲$79.54 billion (116th)
  - Per capita: ▲$3,230 (175th)
- GDP (nominal): 2026 estimate
  - Total: ▲$32.51 billion (116th)
  - Per capita: ▲$1,320 (170th)
- Gini (2021): 37.4 medium inequality
- HDI (2023): ▲0.459 low (186th)
- Currency: West African CFA franc (XOF)
- Time zone: UTC+00:00 (GMT)
- Calling code: +226
- ISO 3166 code: BF
- Internet TLD: .bf

Burkina Faso, (Note: UK: /bɜːrˌkiːnə ˈfæsoʊ/ bur-KEE-nə FASS-oh, US: /-ˈfɑːsoʊ/ -FAH-soh;) formerly known as Upper Volta, is a landlocked country in West Africa. It is bordered by Mali to the northwest, Niger to the northeast, Benin to the southeast, Togo and Ghana to the south, and Ivory Coast to the southwest. It covers an area of 274,223 km^{2} (105,878 sq mi). In 2024, the country had an estimated population of approximately 23,286,000. Its citizens are known as Burkinabes, and its capital and largest city is Ouagadougou.

The largest ethnic group in Burkina Faso is the Mossi people, who settled the area in the 11th and 13th centuries. They established kingdoms such as Ouagadougou, Tenkodogo, and Yatenga. In 1896, it was colonised by the French as part of French West Africa; in 1958, it became a self-governing colony within the French Community. In 1960, it gained full independence with the name of the Republic of Upper Volta, with Maurice Yaméogo as the president. Since it gained its independence, the country has dealt with political instability, droughts, famines, and corruption. There have been various coups d'état, in 1966, 1980, 1982, 1983, 1987, and twice in 2022, in January and September. There were also unsuccessful coup attempts in 1989, 2015, and 2023.

Burkina Faso remains one of the least developed countries in the world, with a GDP of $16.226 billion in 2022. Approximately 63.8% of its population practices Islam, while 26.3% practices Christianity and 9% animistic religions, especially in the southwest of the country. The country's official languages include Mooré, Dyula, Fula, and Bissa (as of 1998), with Mooré being spoken by over half the population. There are more than 60 indigenous languages, and the constitution provides for other languages to be made official by law. The former government and business language was French until January 2024 when, alongside English, its status was demoted to that of a "working language" by ratification of a constitutional amendment.

The country's territory is geographically biodiverse, and includes plentiful reserves of gold, manganese, copper and limestone. Due to its multicultural make-up, Burkinabe art has a rich and long history, and is renowned for its orthodox style.

The country is governed as a semi-presidential republic, with executive, legislative and judicial powers. It is a member of the United Nations and the Organisation of Islamic Cooperation. In 2025, Burkina Faso withdrew from ECOWAS and La Francophonie, after it helped form the Alliance of Sahel States (AES). It also remains suspended from the African Union.

== Etymology ==
The country was renamed "Burkina Faso" on 4 August 1984 by then-President Thomas Sankara. The words "Burkina" and "Faso" stem from different languages spoken in the country: "Burkina" comes from Mooré and means "upright", showing how the people are proud of their integrity. "Faso" comes from the Dyula language, as written in N'Ko: ߝߊ߬ߛߏ߫ faso, and means "fatherland", literally, "father's house". The "-bé" suffix added onto "Burkina" to form the demonym "Burkinabé" comes from the Fula language and means "women or men". The US Central Intelligence Agency's World Fact Book gives the translation as "Land of the Honest (Incorruptible) Men".

The French Colony of Upper Volta was named for its location on the upper courses of the Volta River, the Black, Red and White Volta.

== History ==
=== Early history ===
The northwestern part of present-day Burkina Faso was populated by hunter-gatherers from 14,000 BC to 5,000 BC. Their tools, including scrapers, chisels and arrowheads, were discovered in 1973 through archaeological excavations. Agricultural settlements were established between 3600 and 2600 BC.

Iron metallurgy occurred in regions near Douroula at least as far back as the 8th century BC and was widely practiced across the region by the 5th century BC. The oldest evidence of iron smelting found in Burkina Faso dates from 800 to 700 BC and forms part of the Ancient Ferrous Metallurgy World Heritage Site. From the 3rd to the 13th centuries AD, the Bura culture existed in the territory of present-day southeastern Burkina Faso and southwestern Niger.

West Africa c. 1875

=== 8th to 18th centuries ===
From medieval times until the end of the 19th century, the central region of present-day Burkina Faso was ruled by the Mossi people, descendants of warriors of the Dagomba people of present-day Ghana, who mixed with Mandé and other local peoples in the 11th century. During this time, the Mossi Kingdoms successfully defended their territory, religious beliefs and social structure against forcible attempts at conquest and conversion from Muslims to the northwest. However, by the 11th century Islam had been accepted.

The Samo arrived around the 15th century. The Dogon lived in Burkina Faso's north and northwest regions until sometime in the 15th or 16th centuries, and many of the other ethnic groups that make up the country's population arrived in the region during this time.

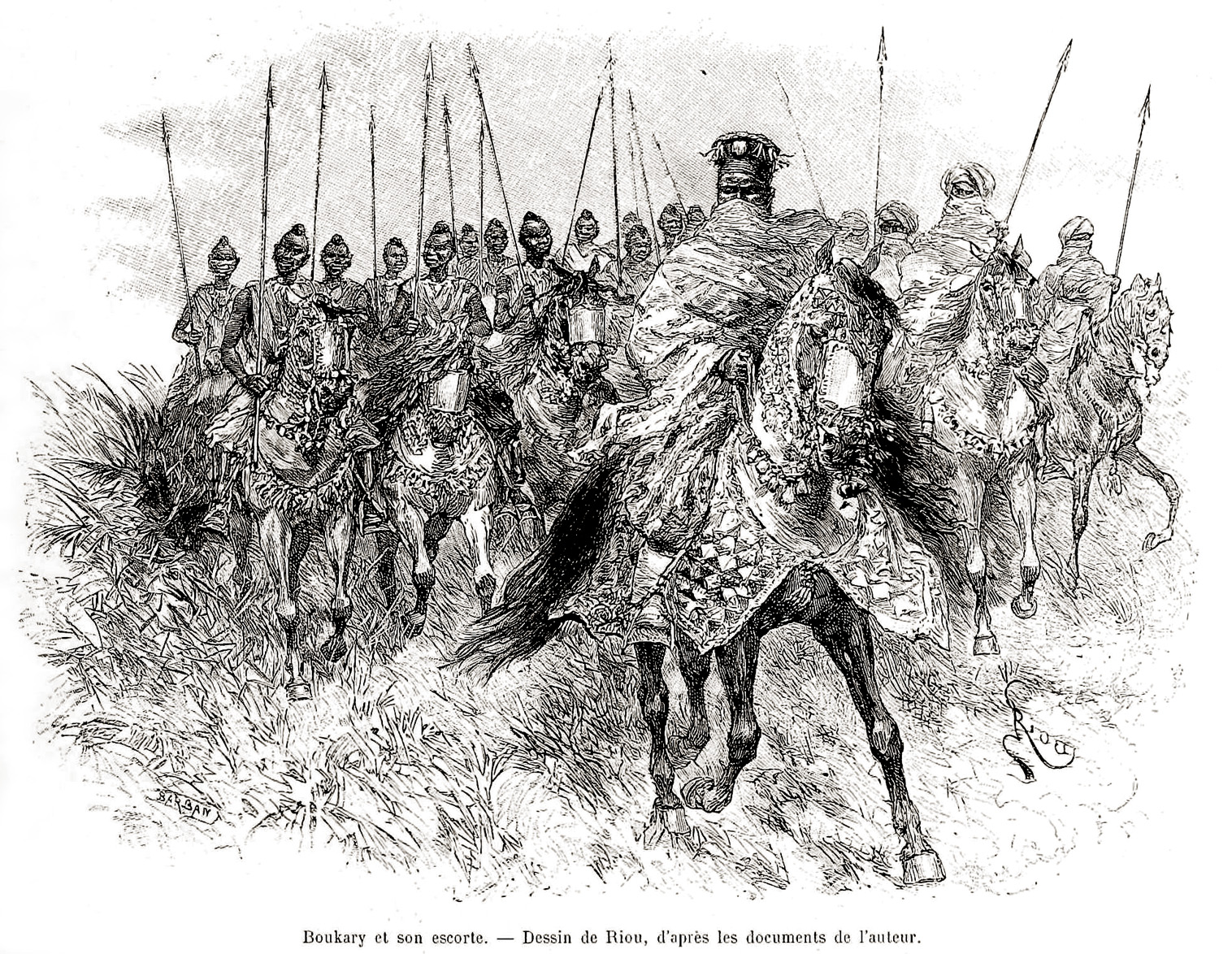
The cavalry of the Mossi Kingdoms were experts at raiding deep into enemy territory, even against the formidable Mali Empire.

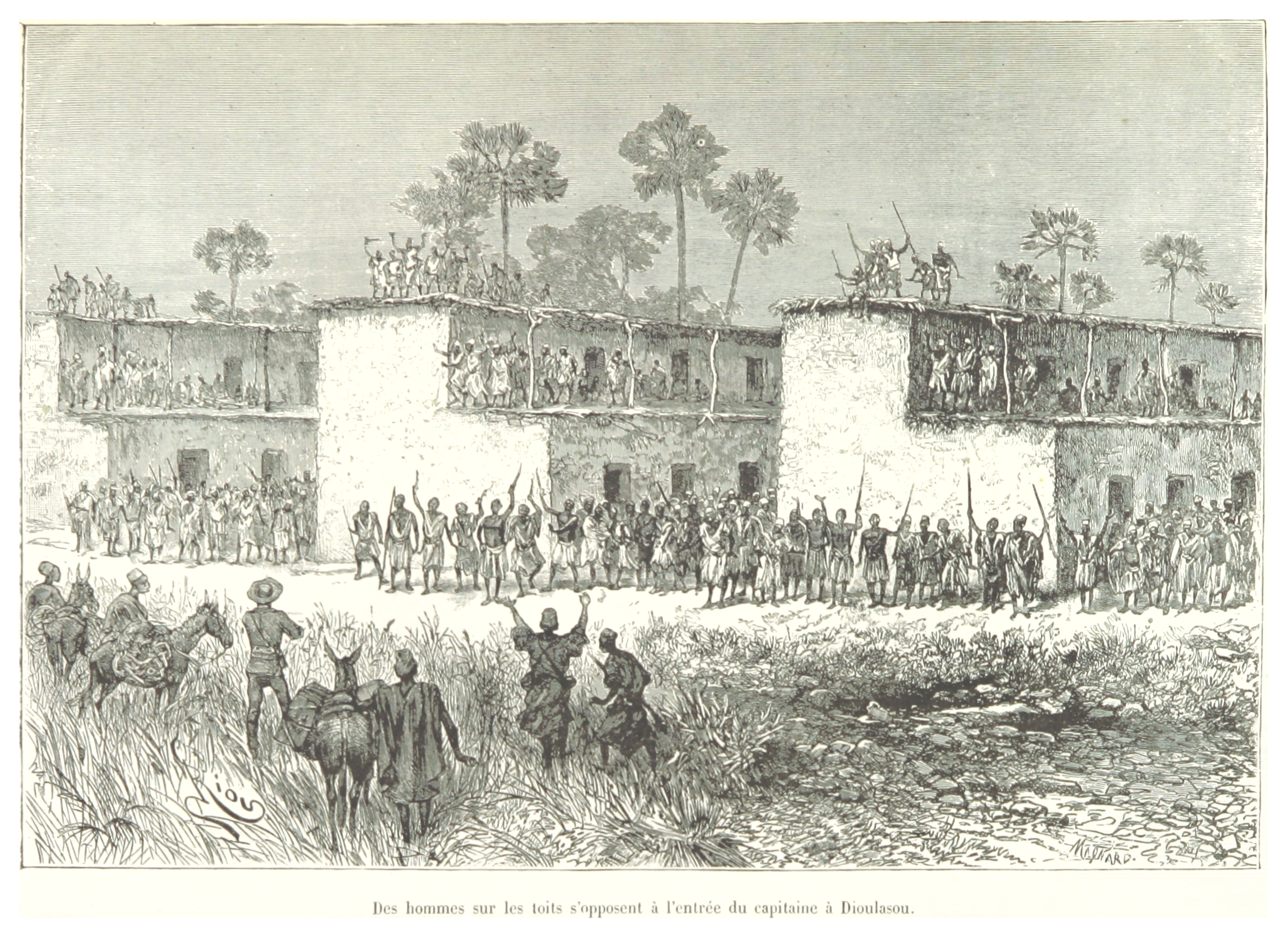
Armed men prevent the French explorer Louis-Gustave Binger from entering Sia (Bobo-Dioulasso) during his stay in April 1892.

During the Middle Ages, the Mossi established several separate kingdoms including those of Tenkodogo, Yatenga, Zandoma, and Ouagadougou. The Mossi Kingdoms in present-day Burkina Faso are mentioned in the seventeenth-century Timbuktu chronicles. According to the Tarikh al-Sudan, the Mossi ruler successfully took control of Timbuktu during the reign of Mansa Musa in the 14th century, plundering the city with the help of a large army sometime between 1328 and 1338. In 1337, Mansa Musa said he was at war with a relentless enemy "among the blacks ... skilled in shooting arrows", possibly referring to the Mossi sacking Timbuktu. The Tarikh al-fattash describes military conflicts between the 15th century Mossi king known locally as Komdao and the Songhay ruler Sonni Ali. The Burkinabé capital was called Argūma, in present-day Yatenga. The Mossi were defeated at the Battle of Kobi in Mali in 1483.

According to Boubou Hama in 1966, there is a 1410 Arabic manuscript describing the people of the Niger Bend, containing a paragraph about the Mossi kingdom on the Niger river. Michel Izard writes that it is impossible to make scientific use of this information since the manuscript is unpublished.

During the early 16th century, the Songhai conducted many slave raids into what is today Burkina Faso. During the 18th century, the Gwiriko Kingdom was established at Bobo-Dioulasso and ethnic groups such as the Dyan, Lobi, and Birifor settled along the Black Volta.

=== From colony to independence (1890s–1958) ===
During the European Scramble for Africa, various European powers attempted to colonise much of modern-day Burkina Faso. The Mossi Kingdoms long resisted European colonisation, maintaining their autonomy and traditional governance systems until their defeat to France in 1896. Although nominally conquered, French control over large swaths of land remained uncertain, being complicated by local militias, especially Samori Ture.

French West Africa c. 1913

Borders between France and Britain were agreed at the Anglo-French Convention of 1898. In 1904, the largely part pacified territories were organised as the Upper Senegal and Niger colony within the colonial federation of French West Africa. The indigenous population was highly discriminated against. In the aftermath of the Volta-Bani War and World War I, the colony was in 1919–1921 split into French Upper Volta and French Sudan, with the former constituting the modern-day borders of Burkina Faso. The colony was dismembered in 1932, being split between the French colonies of Ivory Coast, French Sudan and Niger. After World War II, however, the Mossi pressured the French for separate territorial status, and in 1947, the Upper Volta was revived as a colony in its own right under the French Union with its previous boundaries.

On 11 December 1958, the colony achieved self-government as the Republic of Upper Volta; it joined the Franco-African Community. A revision in the organisation of French Overseas Territories had begun with the passage of the Basic Law (Loi Cadre) of 23 July 1956. This act was followed by reorganisation measures approved by the French parliament early in 1957 to ensure a large degree of self-government for individual territories. Upper Volta became an autonomous republic in the French community on 11 December 1958. Full independence from France was received in 1960.

=== Upper Volta (1958–1984) ===
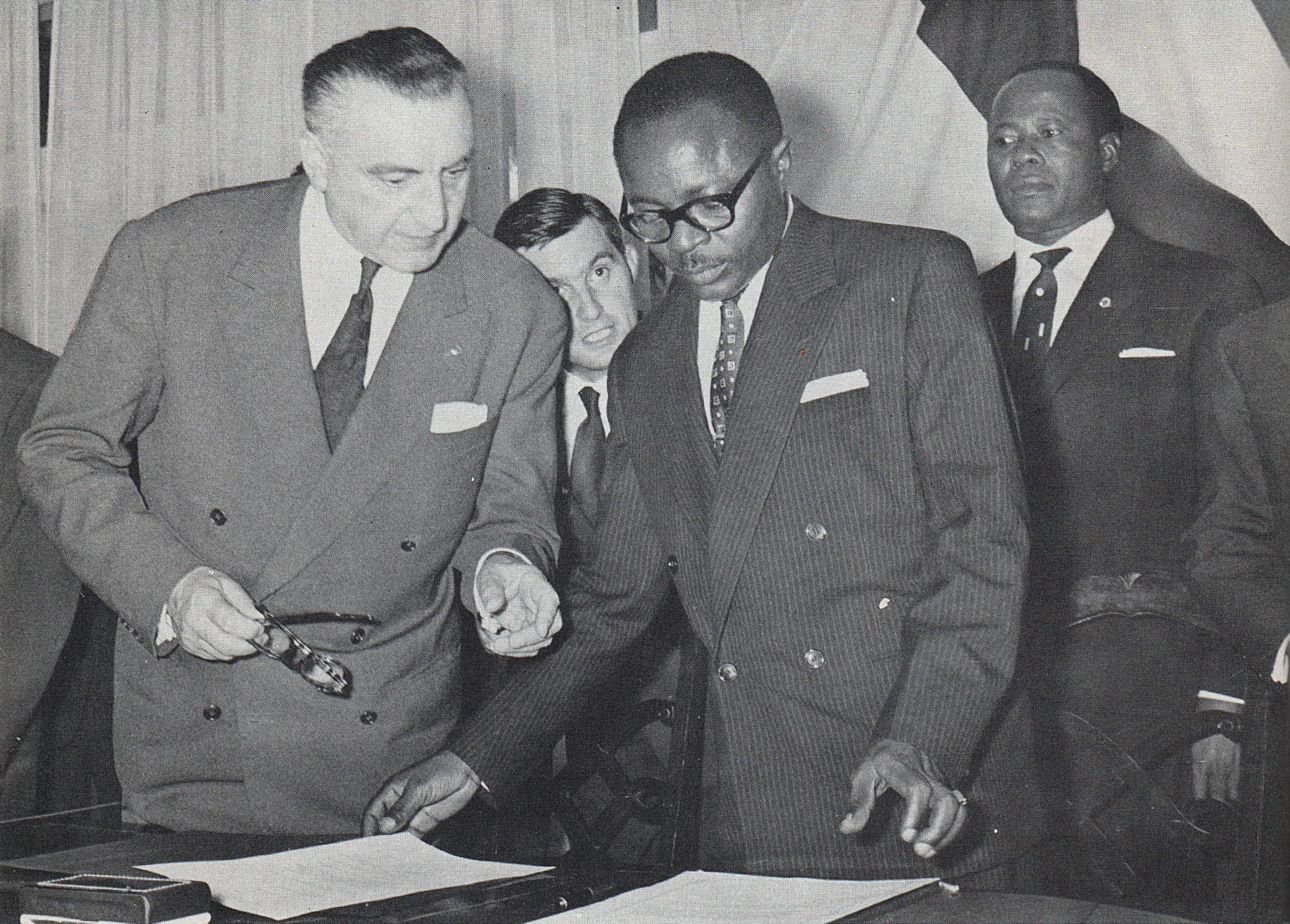
Maurice Yaméogo, the first president of Upper Volta, examines documents pertaining to the ratification of the country's independence in 1960.

The Republic of Upper Volta (French: République de Haute-Volta) was established on 11 December 1958 as a self-governing colony within the French Community. The name Upper Volta referred to the nation's location along the upper reaches of the Volta River. The river's three tributaries — the Black Volta, White Volta, and Red Volta — were represented by the three colours of the former national flag: black, white, and red.

Before attaining autonomy, it had been French Upper Volta and part of the French Union. On 5 August 1960, it attained full independence from France. The first president, Maurice Yaméogo, was the leader of the Voltaic Democratic Union (UDV). The 1960 constitution provided for election by universal suffrage of a president and a national assembly. Soon after coming to power, Yaméogo banned all political parties other than the UDV. The government lasted until 1966. After much unrest, including mass demonstrations and strikes by students, labor unions, and civil servants, the military intervened.

==== Lamizana's rule and multiple coups ====
The 1966 military coup deposed Yaméogo, suspended the constitution, dissolved the National Assembly, and placed Lt. Col. Sangoulé Lamizana at the head of a government of senior army officers. The army remained in power for four years. On 14 June 1976, the Voltans ratified a new constitution that established a four-year transition period toward complete civilian rule. Lamizana remained in power throughout the 1970s as president of military or mixed civil-military governments. Lamizana's rule coincided with the beginning of the Sahel drought and famine which had a devastating impact on Upper Volta and neighboring countries. After conflict over the 1976 constitution, a new constitution was written and approved in 1977. Lamizana was re-elected by open elections in 1978.

Lamizana's government faced problems with the country's traditionally powerful trade unions, and on 25 November 1980, Col. Saye Zerbo overthrew President Lamizana in a bloodless coup. Colonel Zerbo established the Military Committee of Recovery for National Progress as the supreme governmental authority, thus eradicating the 1977 constitution.

Colonel Zerbo also encountered resistance from trade unions and was overthrown two years later by Maj. Dr. Jean-Baptiste Ouédraogo and the Council of Popular Salvation (CSP) in the 1982 Upper Voltan coup d'état. The CSP continued to ban political parties and organisations, yet promised a transition to civilian rule and a new constitution.

==== 1983 coup d'état ====
Infighting developed between the right and left factions of the CSP. The leader of the leftists, Capt. Thomas Sankara, was appointed prime minister in January 1983, but was subsequently arrested. Efforts to free him, directed by Capt. Blaise Compaoré, resulted in a military coup d'état on 4 August 1983.

The coup brought Sankara to power and his government began to implement a series of revolutionary programs which included mass-vaccinations, infrastructure improvements, the expansion of women's rights, encouragement of domestic agricultural consumption, and anti-desertification projects.

=== Burkina Faso (since 1984) ===
On 2 August 1984, on Sankara's initiative, the country's name changed from "Upper Volta" to "Burkina Faso", or land of the honest men; (the literal translation is land of the upright men). The presidential decree was confirmed by the National Assembly on 4 August 1984.

Sankara launched an ambitious socioeconomic programme for change, one of the largest ever undertaken on the African continent. His foreign policies centred on anti-imperialism, with his government rejecting all foreign aid, pushing for odious debt reduction, nationalising all land and mineral wealth and averting the power and influence of the International Monetary Fund (IMF) and World Bank. His domestic policies included a nationwide literacy campaign, land redistribution to peasants, railway and road construction and the outlawing of female genital mutilation, forced marriages and polygamy.

Sankara pushed for agrarian self-sufficiency and promoted public health by vaccinating 2,500,000 children against meningitis, yellow fever, and measles. His national agenda also included planting more than 10,000,000 trees to halt the growing desertification of the Sahel. Sankara called on every village to build a medical dispensary and had more than 350 communities build schools with their own labour.

In the 1980s, when ecological awareness was still very low, Sankara was one of the few African leaders to consider environmental protection a priority. He engaged in three major battles: against bush fires "which will be considered as crimes and will be punished as such"; against cattle roaming "which infringes on the rights of peoples because unattended animals destroy nature"; and against the illegitimate cutting of firewood "whose profession will have to be organised and regulated". As part of a development program involving a large part of the population, ten million trees were planted in Burkina Faso in fifteen months during the revolution. To face the advancing desert and recurrent droughts, Sankara also proposed the planting of wooded strips about fifty kilometers wide, crossing the country from east to west. Cereal production, close to 1.1 billion tons before 1983, was predicted to rise to 1.6 billion tons in 1987. Jean Ziegler, former UN special rapporteur for the right to food, said that the country "had become food self-sufficient."

==== Compaoré presidency (1987–2014) ====
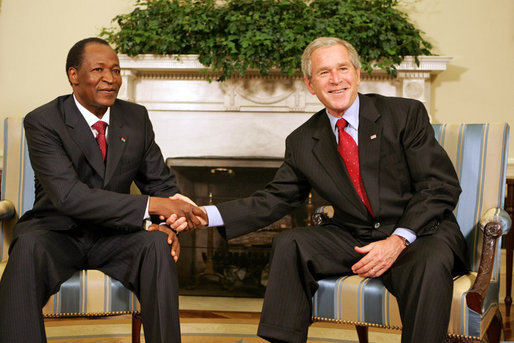
Blaise Compaoré (left), shaking hands with George W. Bush

On 15 October 1987, Sankara and twelve other government officials were assassinated in a coup d'état organised by Blaise Compaoré, Sankara's former colleague, who took over as Burkina Faso's president. He held the position until October 2014. After the coup and although Sankara was known to be dead, some CDRs mounted an armed resistance to the army for several days.

Compaoré gave the deterioration in relations with neighbouring countries as one of the reasons for the coup. He argued that Sankara had jeopardised foreign relations with France and Ivory Coast. Following the coup, Compaoré immediately reversed the nationalisations, overturned nearly all of Sankara's policies. Following an alleged coup-attempt in 1989, Compaoré introduced limited democratic reforms in 1990. Under the 1991 constitution, Compaoré was re-elected without opposition in December 1991. In 1998 Compaoré won election in a landslide.

In 2000, the constitution was amended to reduce the presidential term to five years and set term limits to two. In August 2005, Compaoré announced his intention to run for a third term. Opposition politicians argued that Compaoré could not run in the election because a constitutional amendment passed in 2000 limited a president to two terms. Compaoré's supporters, however, argued that the amendment could not be applied retroactively. In October 2005, the Constitutional Council ruled that because Compaoré was president in 2000, the amendment would not apply until the end of his current term, thereby allowing his candidacy in the 2005 election.

In the 2010 presidential election, Compaoré was re-elected. Only 1.6 million Burkinabè voted, out of a total population 10 times that size. In February 2011, the death of a schoolboy provoked the 2011 Burkinabè protests, a series of popular protests, coupled with a military mutiny and a magistrates' strike, that called for Compaoré's resignation, democratic reforms, higher wages for troops and public servants and economic freedom. As a result, governors were replaced and wages for public servants were raised. In April 2011, there was an army mutiny; the president named new chiefs of staff, and a curfew was imposed in Ouagadougou.

Compaoré's government played the role of negotiator in several West-African disputes, including the 2010–2011 Ivorian crisis, the Inter-Togolese Dialogue (2007), and the 2012 Malian Crisis. As of 2014, Burkina Faso remained one of the least-developed countries in the world.

==== Kafando presidency ====
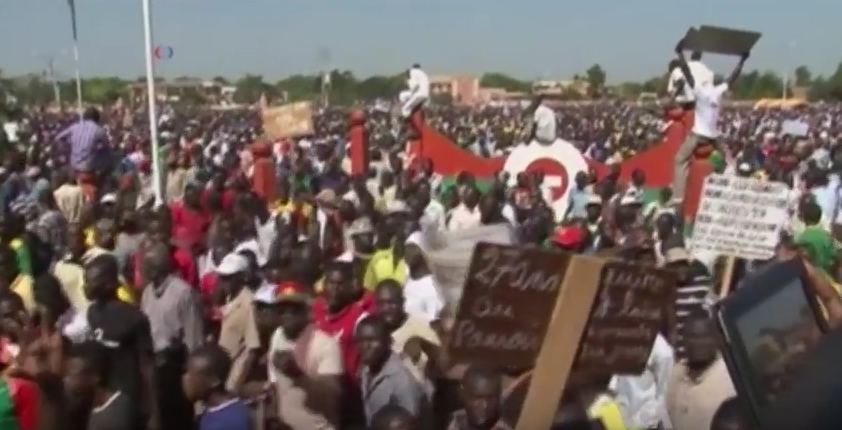
Thousands of protesters march through Ouagadougou, 2014

Starting on 28 October 2014 protesters began to march and demonstrate in Ouagadougou against President Compaoré, who appeared ready to amend the constitution and extend his rule. On 30 October protesters set fire to the parliament building and took over the national TV headquarters. Ouagadougou International Airport closed and MPs suspended the vote on changing the constitution (the change would have allowed Compaoré to stand for re-election in 2015). Later in the day, the military dissolved all government institutions and imposed a curfew.

On 31 October 2014, Compaoré resigned. Lt. Col. Isaac Zida said that he would lead the country during its transitional period before the planned 2015 presidential election, but there were concerns over his close ties to the former president. In November 2014 opposition parties, civil-society groups and religious leaders adopted a plan for a transitional authority to guide Burkina Faso to elections.

On 16 September 2015, the Regiment of Presidential Security (RSP) carried out a coup d'état, seizing the president and prime minister and then declaring the National Council for Democracy the new national government. However, on 22 September 2015, the coup leader, Gilbert Diendéré, vowed to restore civilian government. On 23 September 2015 the prime minister and interim president were restored to power.

==== Kaboré presidency and Jihadist insurgency (2015–2023) ====
General elections took place on 29 November 2015. Roch Marc Christian Kaboré won the election in the first round with 53.5% of the vote, defeating businessman Zéphirin Diabré, who took 29.7%. Kaboré was sworn in as president on 29 December 2015. Kaboré was re-elected in the general election of 22 November 2020, but his party Mouvement du Peuple pour le Progrès (MPP), failed to reach absolute parliamentary majority. It secured 56 seats out of a total of 127. The Congress for Democracy and Progress (CDP), the party of former President Blaise Compaoré, was distant second with 20 seats.

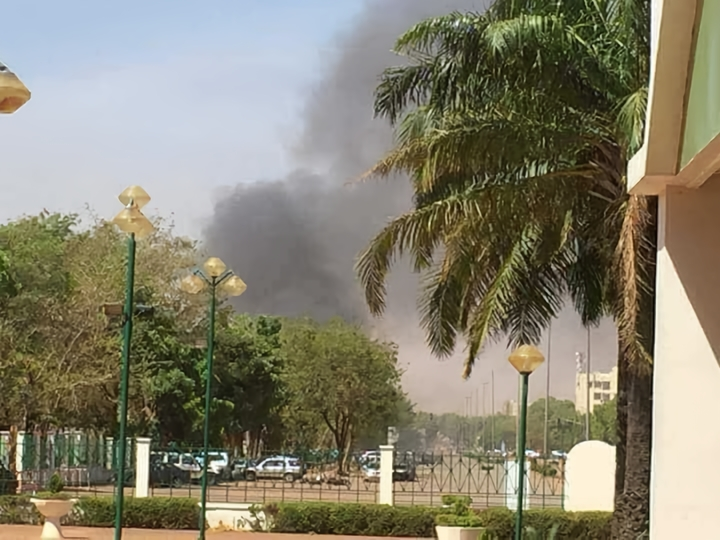
Smoke rising from French Embassy in Ouagadougou, 2 March 2018, during the 2018 Ouagadougou attacks

A Jihadist insurgency began in August 2015, part of the Islamist insurgency in the Sahel. Between August 2015 and October 2016, seven different posts were attacked across the country. On 15 January 2016, terrorists attacked the capital city of Ouagadougou, killing 30 people. Al-Qaeda in the Islamic Maghreb and Al-Mourabitoune, which until then had mostly operated in neighbouring Mali, claimed responsibility for the attack.

In 2016, attacks increased after a new group Ansarul Islam, led by imam Ibrahim Malam Dicko, was founded. Its attacks focused particularly on Soum province and it killed dozens of people in the attack on Nassoumbou on 16 December.

Between 27 March and 10 April 2017, the governments of Mali, France, and Burkina Faso launched a joint operation named "Operation Panga", which involved 1,300 soldiers from the three countries, in the Fhero Forest, near the Burkina Faso-Mali border, considered a sanctuary for Ansarul Islam. The head of Ansarul Islam, Ibrahim Malam Dicko, was killed in June 2017 and Jafar Dicko became leader.

On 2 March 2018, Jama'at Nasr al-Islam wal Muslimin attacked the French embassy in Ouagadougou as well as the general staff of the Burkinabè army. Eight soldiers and eight attackers were killed, and a further 61 soldiers and 24 civilians were injured. The insurgency expanded to the east of the country and, in early October, the Armed Forces of Burkina Faso launched a major military operation in the country's East, supported by French forces. Between mid-2018 to February 2019, at least 42 people were murdered by jihadists and a minimum of 116 mostly Fulani civilians were killed by military forces without trial. The attacks increased significantly in 2019. According to the ACLED, armed violence in Burkina Faso jumped by 174% in 2019, with nearly 1,300 civilians dead and 860,000 displaced. Jihadist groups also began to specifically target Christians.

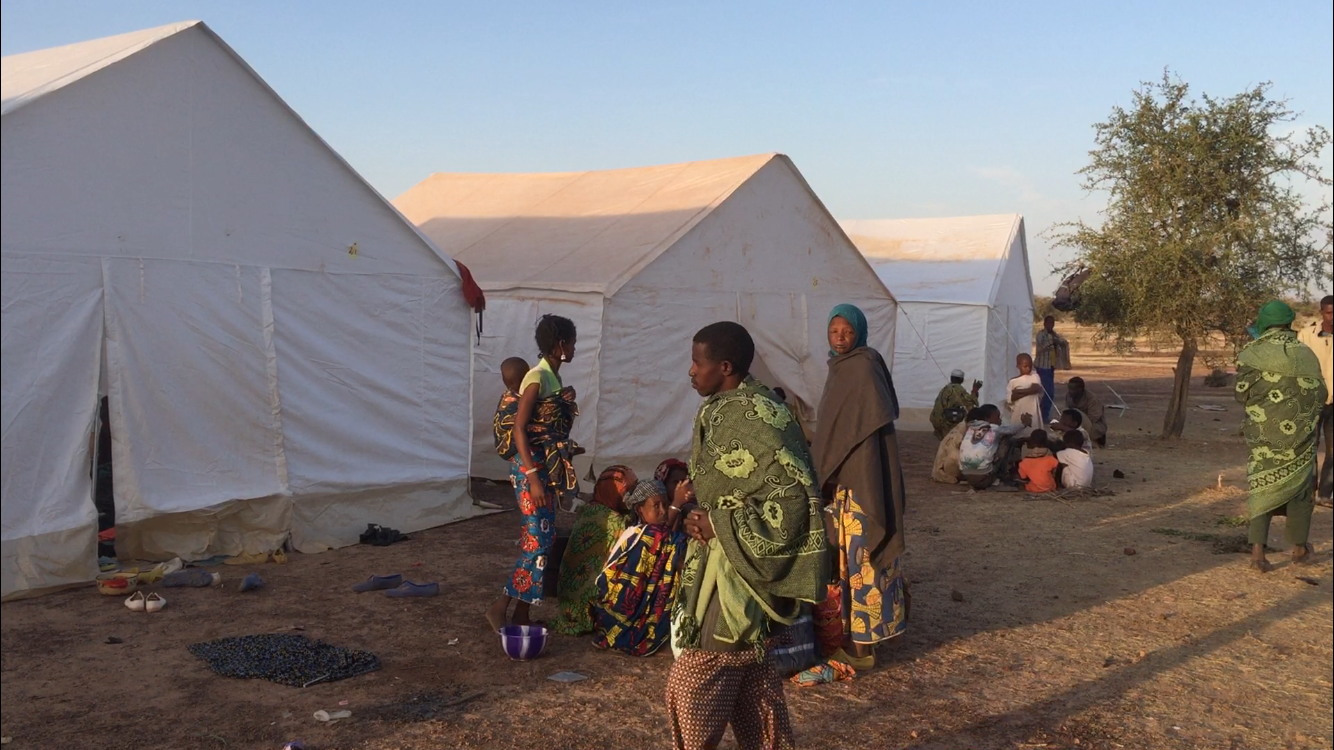
Displaced Fulani civilians in the aftermath of the Yirgou massacre

On 8 July 2020, the United States raised concerns after a Human Rights Watch report revealed mass graves with at least 180 bodies, which were found in northern Burkina Faso where soldiers were fighting jihadists. On 4 June 2021, the Associated Press reported that according to the government of Burkina Faso, gunmen killed at least 100 people in Solhan village in northern Burkina Faso near the Niger border. A local market and several homes were also burned down. A government spokesman blamed jihadists. Heni Nsaibia, senior researcher at the Armed Conflict Location and Event Data Project said it was the deadliest attack recorded in Burkina Faso since the beginning of the jihadist insurgency.

From 4–5 June 2021, unknown militants massacred more than 170 people in the villages of Solhan and Tadaryat. Jihadists killed 80 people in Gorgadji on 20 August. On 14 November, the Jama'at Nasr al-Islam wal Muslimin attacked a gendarmerie in Inata, killing 53 soldiers, the heaviest loss of life by the Burkinabe military during the insurgency, and a major morale loss in the country. In December Islamists killed 41 people in an ambush, including the popular vigilante leader Ladji Yoro. Yoro was a central figure in the Volunteers for the Defense of the Homeland (VDP) a pro-government militia that had taken a leading role in the struggle against Islamists.

In 2023, shortly after the murder of a Catholic priest by insurgents, the bishop of Dori, Laurent Dabiré, claimed in an interview with Catholic charity Aid to the Church in Need that around 50% of the country was in the hands of Islamists.

==== 2022 coups and Traoré presidency ====
A map of the Islamist insurgency in Burkina Faso, November 2024. The government controlled areas of Burkina Faso are in blue.

The Alliance of Sahel States between Burkina Faso, Mali and Niger

In a successful coup on 24 January 2022, mutinying soldiers arrested and deposed President Roch Marc Christian Kaboré following gunfire. The Patriotic Movement for Safeguard and Restoration (MPSR) supported by the military declared itself to be in power, led by Lieutenant Colonel Paul-Henri Sandaogo Damiba. On 31 January, the military junta restored the constitution and appointed Damiba interim president. In the aftermath of the coup, ECOWAS and the African Union suspended Burkina Faso's membership.

On 10 February, the Constitutional Council declared Damiba president. He was sworn in as president on 16 February. On 1 March 2022, the junta approved a charter allowing a military-led transition of 3 years. The charter provides for the transition process to be followed by the holding of elections. President Kaboré, who had been detained since the military junta took power, was released on 6 April 2022.

The insurgency continued following the coup, with about 60% of the country under government control. The Siege of Djibo began in February 2022 and continued as of June 2023. Between 100 and 165 people were killed in Seytenga Department, Séno Province on 12–13 June and around 16,000 people fled their homes. In June 2022, the Government announced the creation of "military zones", which civilians were required to vacate so that the country's Armed and Security Forces could fight insurgents without any "hindrances".

On 30 September 2022, Damiba was ousted in a military coup led by Capt. Ibrahim Traoré. This came eight months after Damiba had seized power. The rationale given by Traoré for the coup d'état was the purported inability of Paul-Henri Sandaogo Damiba to deal with an Islamist insurgency. Damiba resigned and left the country. On 6 October 2022, Captain Ibrahim Traoré was officially appointed as president. Apollinaire Joachim Kyélem de Tambèla was appointed interim Prime Minister on 21 October 2022.

On 13 April 2023, authorities in Burkina Faso declared a mobilisation in order to give the nation all means necessary to combat terrorism and create a "legal framework for all the actions to be taken" against the insurgents in recapturing 40% of the national territory from Islamist insurgents. On 20 April, the Rapid Intervention Brigade committed the Karma massacre, rounding up and executing civilians en masse. Between 60 and 156 civilians were killed.

On 25 August 2024, JNIM again launched a major attack in the region of Barsalogho, killing at least 400 people.

In 2025, the armed forces foiled an attempted coup, which they said had been planned by plotters based in the Ivory Coast. Thousands rallied in Ouagadougou in support of the military government after the foiled coup plot. In May, reports of a digital cult around Traoré began to surface.

== Geography ==
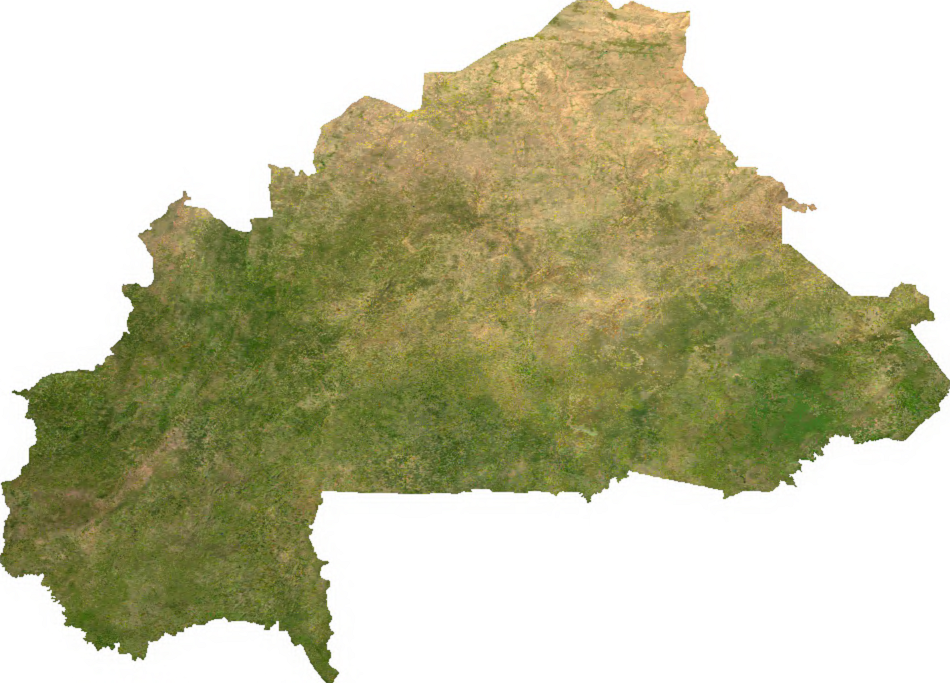
A satellite image of Burkina Faso

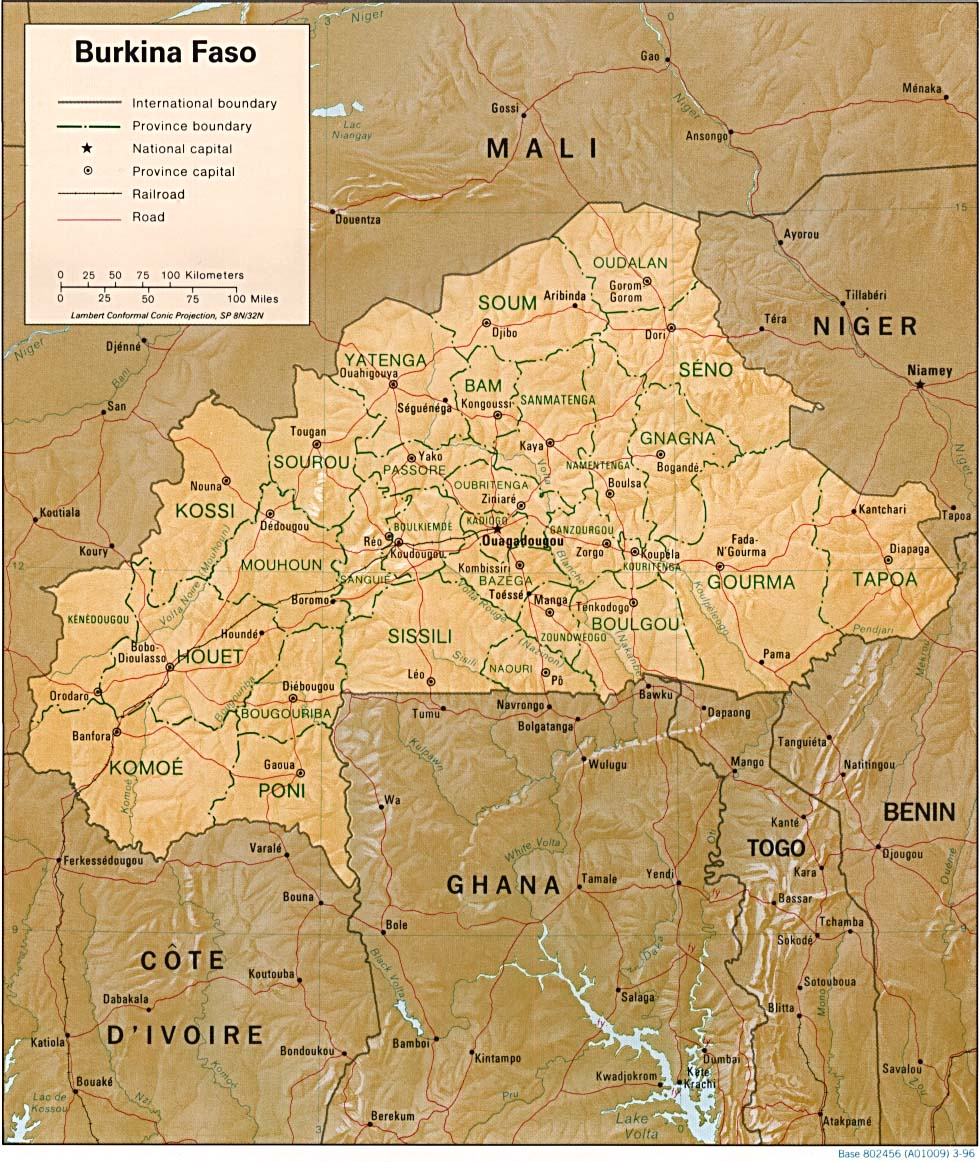
A map of Burkina Faso

Burkina Faso lies mostly between latitudes 9° and 15° N (a small area is north of 15°), and longitudes 6° W and 3° E.

There are two major types of countryside. The larger part of the country is covered by a peneplain, which forms a gently undulating landscape with, in some areas, a few isolated hills, the last vestiges of a Precambrian massif. The southwest of the country is a sandstone massif, where the highest peak, Ténakourou, is found at an elevation of 749 meters (2,457 ft). The massif is bordered by sheer cliffs up to 150 m (492 ft) high. The average altitude of Burkina Faso is 400 m (1,312 ft) and the difference between the highest and lowest terrain is no greater than 600 m (1,969 ft).

The country owes its former name of Upper Volta to three rivers which cross it: the Black Volta (or Mouhoun), the White Volta (Nakambé) and the Red Volta (Nazinon). The Black Volta is one of the country's only two rivers which flow year-round, the other being the Komoé, which flows to the southwest. The basin of the Niger River also drains 27% of the country's surface.

The Niger's tributaries – the Béli, Gorouol, Goudébo, and Dargol – are seasonal streams and flow for only four to six months a year. They still can flood and overflow, however. The country also contains numerous lakes – the principal ones are Tingrela, Bam, and Dem. The country contains large ponds, such as Oursi, Béli, Yomboli, and Markoye. Water shortages are often a problem, especially in the north of the country.

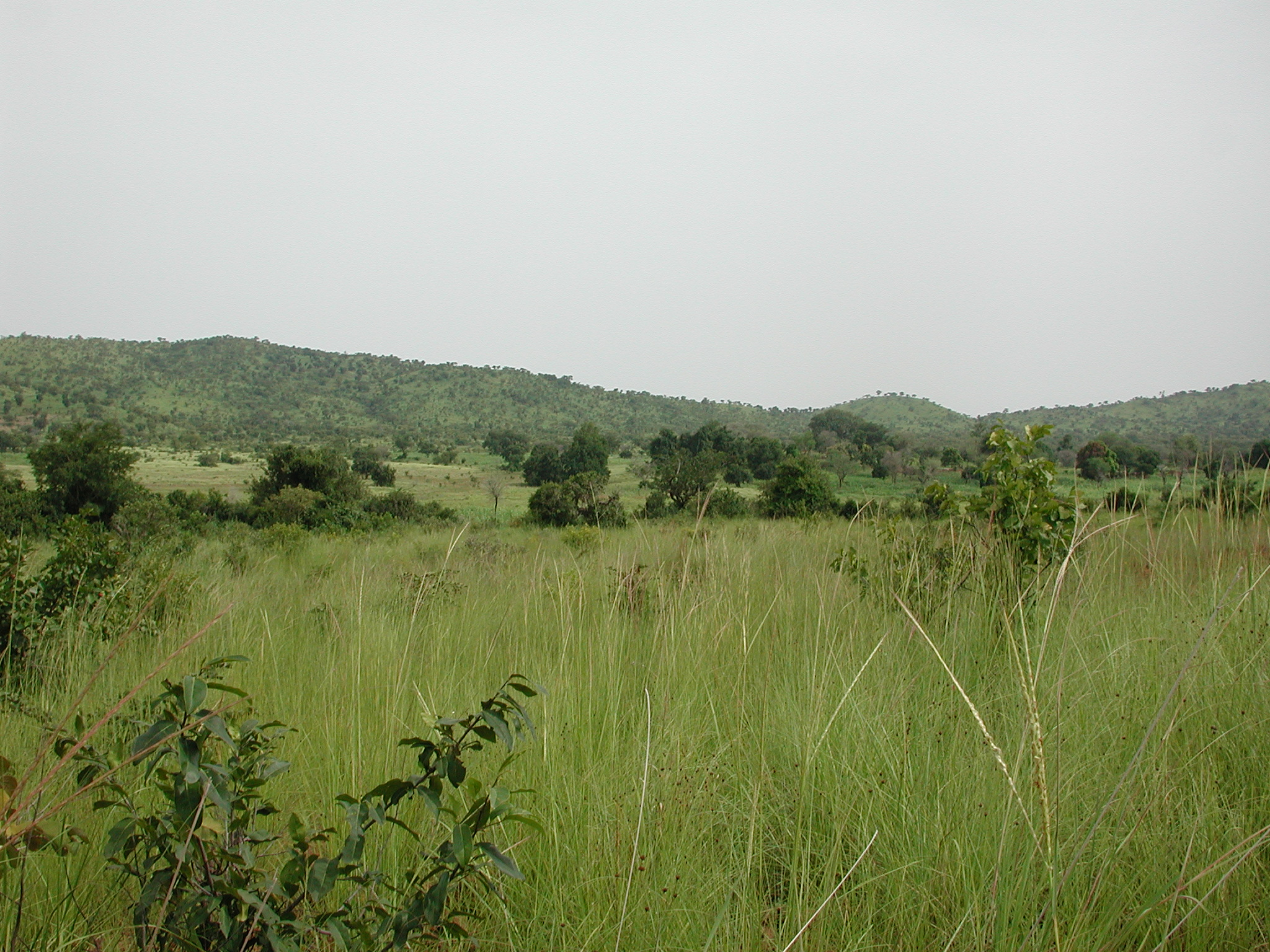
Savannah near the Gbomblora Department, on the road from Gaoua to Batié

Burkina Faso lies within two terrestrial ecoregions: Sahelian Acacia savanna and West Sudanian savanna.

In Burkina Faso forest cover is around 23% of the total land area, equivalent to 6,216,400 hectares (ha) of forest in 2020, down from 7,716,600 hectares (ha) in 1990. In 2020, naturally regenerating forest covered 6,039,300 hectares (ha) and planted forest covered 177,100 hectares (ha). Of the naturally regenerating forest 0% was reported to be primary forest (consisting of native tree species with no clearly visible indications of human activity) and around 16% of the forest area was found within protected areas. For the year 2015, 100% of the forest area was reported to be under public ownership.

=== Climate ===
A map of Burkina Faso's climate zones

Burkina Faso has a primarily tropical climate with two very distinct seasons. In the rainy season, the country receives between 600 and 900 mm (24 and 35 in) of rainfall. In the dry season, the harmattan – a hot dry wind from the Sahara – blows. The rainy season lasts around four months, May/June to September, but is shorter in the north of the country. There are three climatic zones: the Sahel, the Sudan-Sahel, and the Sudan-Guinea. The Sahel in the north typically receives less than 600 mm (24 in) of rainfall per year and has high temperatures, 5–47 °C (41–117 °F).

A relatively dry tropical savanna, the Sahel extends beyond the borders of Burkina Faso, from the Horn of Africa to the Atlantic Ocean, and borders the Sahara to its north and the fertile region of the Sudan to the south. Situated between 11° 3′ and 13° 5′ north latitude, the Sudan-Sahel region is a transitional zone with regard to rainfall and temperature. Further to the south, the Sudan-Guinea zone receives more than 900 mm (35 in) of rain each year and has cooler average temperatures.

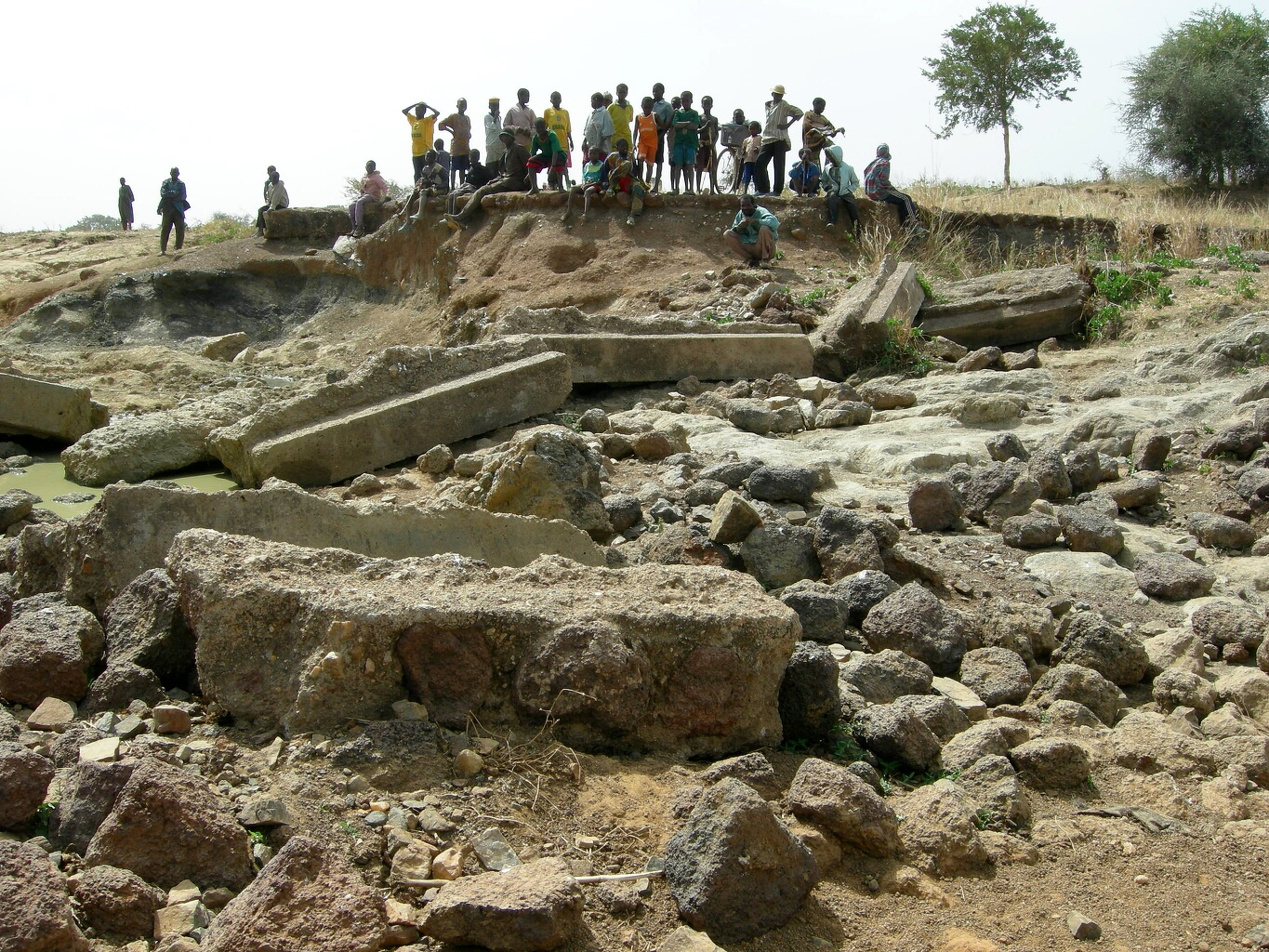
Damage caused by the Dourtenga floods in 2007

Geography and environment contribute to Burkina Faso's food insecurity. As the country is situated in the Sahel region, it has some of the most radical climatic variation in the world, ranging from severe flooding to extreme drought. The unpredictable climatic shocks can make it very difficult for Burkina Faso citizens to rely on and prosper from agriculture.

Burkina Faso's climate renders its crops vulnerable to insect attacks, including attacks from locusts and crickets, which destroy crops and further inhibit food production. Most of the population of Burkina Faso is dependent upon agriculture as a source of income, and rely upon the agricultural sector to directly feed the household. Due to the vulnerability of agriculture, more families are having to look for other sources of non-farm income, and often have to travel outside of their regional zone to find work.

=== Natural resources ===
Burkina Faso's natural resources include gold, manganese, limestone, marble, phosphates, pumice, and salt.

=== Wildlife ===
Burkina Faso has a larger number of elephants than many countries in West Africa. Lions, leopards and buffalo can also be found here, including the dwarf or red buffalo. Other large predators live in Burkina Faso, such as the cheetah, the caracal or African lynx, the spotted hyena and the African painted dog, one of the continent's most endangered species.

Burkina Faso's fauna and flora are protected in four national parks:

- The W National Park in the east, other sections of which are located in Benin and Niger
- The Arly Wildlife Reserve (Arly National Park in the east)
- The Léraba-Comoé Classified Forest and Partial Reserve of Wildlife in the west
- The Mare aux Hippopotames in the west

and several reserves: see List of national parks in Africa and List of protected areas of Burkina Faso.

== Government and politics ==
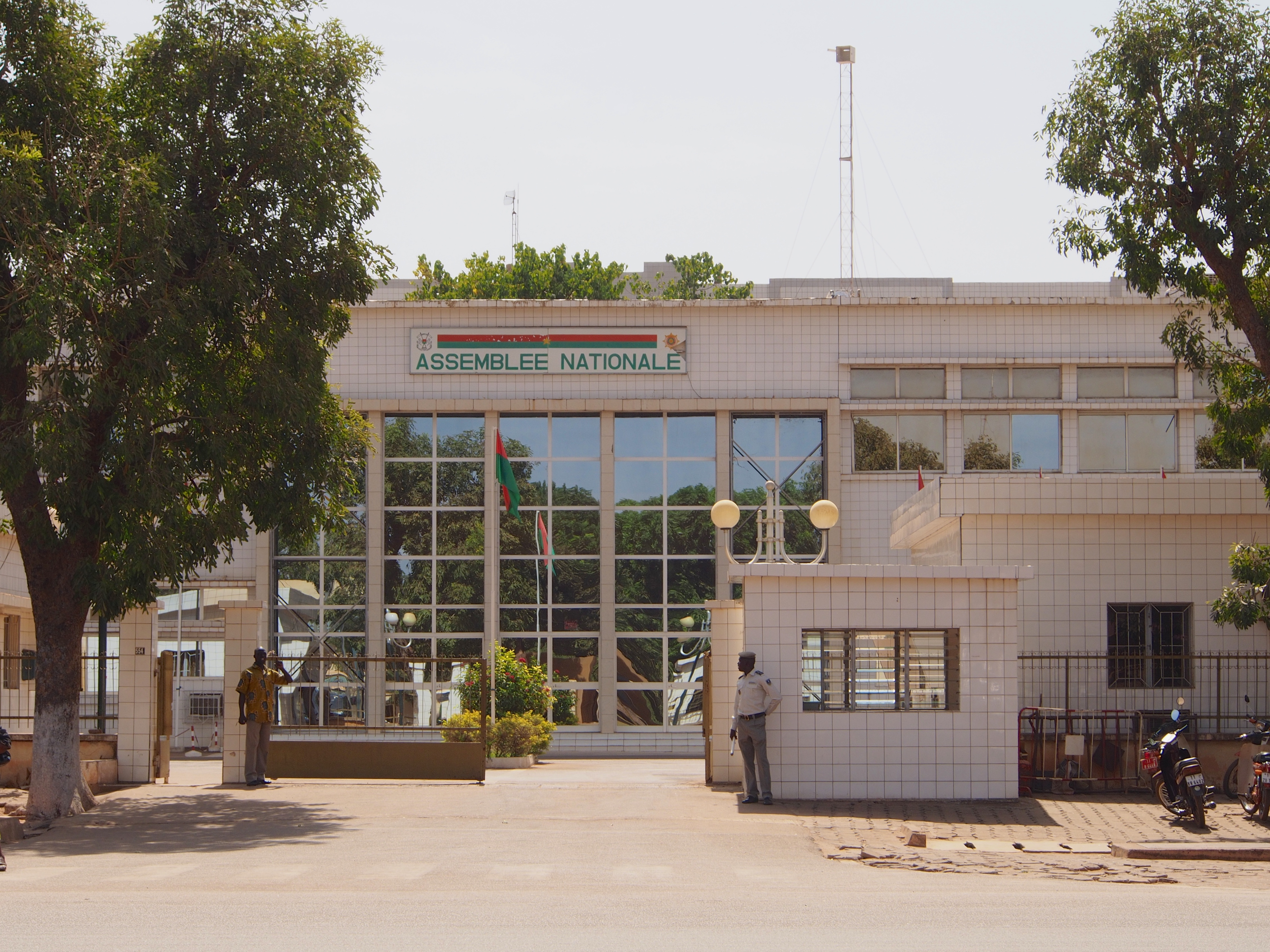
The National Assembly building in downtown Ouagadougou

The June 1991 constitution established a semi-presidential government: its parliament could be dissolved by the President of the Republic, who was to be elected for a term of seven years. In 2000, the constitution was amended to reduce the presidential term to five years and set term limits to two, preventing successive re-election. The amendment took effect during the 2005 elections.

The parliament consisted of one chamber known as the National Assembly, which had 111 seats with members elected to serve five-year terms. There was a constitutional chamber, with ten members, and an economic and social council whose roles were purely consultative. The 1991 constitution created a bicameral parliament, but the upper house (Chamber of Representatives) was abolished in 2002.

The Compaoré administration worked to decentralise power by devolving some of its powers to regions and municipal authorities. The widespread distrust of politicians and lack of political involvement by many residents complicated this process. Critics described this as a hybrid decentralisation.

Political freedoms are severely restricted in Burkina Faso. Human rights organisations had criticised the Compaoré administration for numerous acts of state-sponsored violence against journalists and other politically active members of society.

The prime minister is head of government and is appointed by the president with the approval of the National Assembly. He is responsible for recommending a cabinet for appointment by the president.

=== Constitution ===
In 2015, Kaboré promised to revise the 1991 constitution. The revision was completed in 2018. One condition prevents any individual from serving as president for more than ten years either consecutively or intermittently and provides a method for impeaching a president. A referendum on the constitution for the Fifth Republic was scheduled for 24 March 2019.

Certain rights are also enshrined in the revised wording: access to drinking water, access to decent housing and a recognition of the right to civil disobedience, for example. The referendum was required because the opposition parties in Parliament refused to sanction the proposed text.

Following the January 2022 coup d'état, the military dissolved the parliament, government and constitution. On 31 January, the military junta restored the constitution, but it was suspended again following the September 2022 coup d'état.

The Progressive and Popular Revolution has led to increased scepticism that the constitution will ever be restored in its old form.

=== Administrative divisions ===
The country is divided into 13 administrative regions. These regions encompass 45 provinces and 301 departments. Each region is administered by a governor.

=== Foreign relations ===
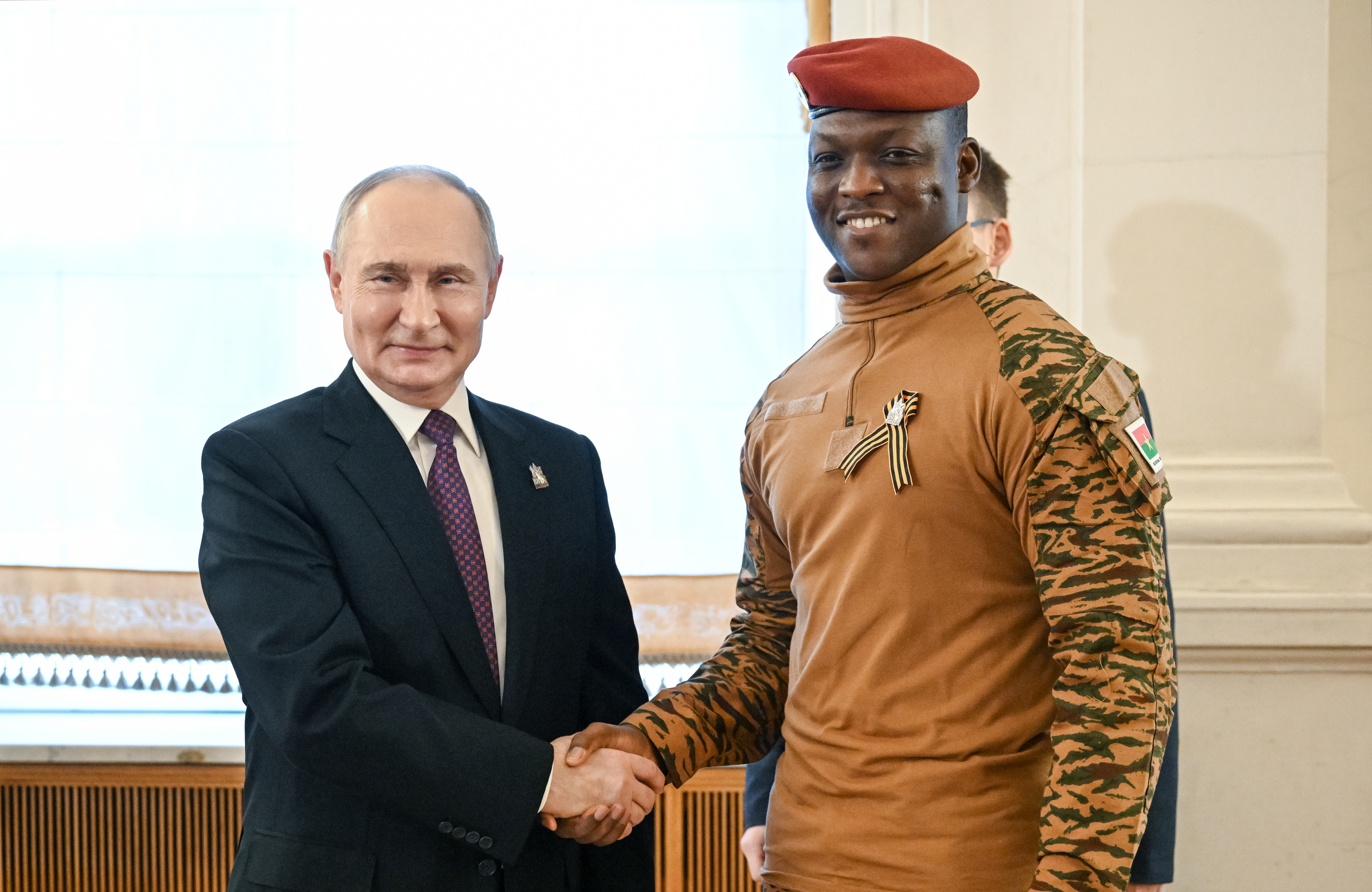
Burkinabè interim President Ibrahim Traoré with Russian President Vladimir Putin in Moscow, 8 May 2025

Burkina Faso is a member of the Community of Sahel–Saharan States, the Organisation of Islamic Cooperation, and United Nations. It formally withdrew from ECOWAS and La Francophonie in 2025, following its suspension by both organisations in 2022 over the military coup. In addition, Burkina Faso remains suspended from the African Union. Until December 2023, Burkina Faso was a member of G5 Sahel, a small group formed in 2014 to co-operate with development and security matters. However, in December 2023 the country withdrew from the organisation due to concerns of "serving foreign interests to the detriments of our people".

=== Military ===
The army has 6,000 men in voluntary service, augmented by a part-time national People's Militia composed of civilians between 25 and 35 years of age who are trained in military and civil duties. According to Jane's Sentinel Country Risk Assessment in 2022, Burkina Faso's Army is undermanned for its force structure and poorly equipped, but has wheeled light-armour vehicles, and may have developed useful combat expertise through interventions in Liberia and elsewhere in Africa.

In terms of training and equipment, the regular Army is believed to be neglected in relation to the elite Regiment of Presidential Security. Reports have emerged in recent years of disputes over pay and conditions.

=== Law enforcement ===
Burkina Faso employs numerous police and security forces, generally modeled after organisations used by French police. France continues to provide significant support and training to police forces. The Gendarmerie Nationale is organised along military lines, with most police services delivered at the brigade level. The Gendarmerie operates under the authority of the Minister of Defence, and its members are employed chiefly in the rural areas and along borders.

There is a municipal police force controlled by the Ministry of Territorial Administration, a national police force controlled by the Ministry of Security, and the autonomous Presidential Security Regiment. Both the gendarmerie and the national police are subdivided into both administrative and judicial police functions; the former are detailed to protect public order and provide security, the latter are charged with criminal investigations.

All foreigners and citizens are required to carry photo ID passports, or other forms of identification or risk a fine, and police spot identity checks are commonplace for persons traveling by auto, bush-taxi, or bus.

== Economy ==
GDP per capita in Burkina Faso, 1950 to 2018

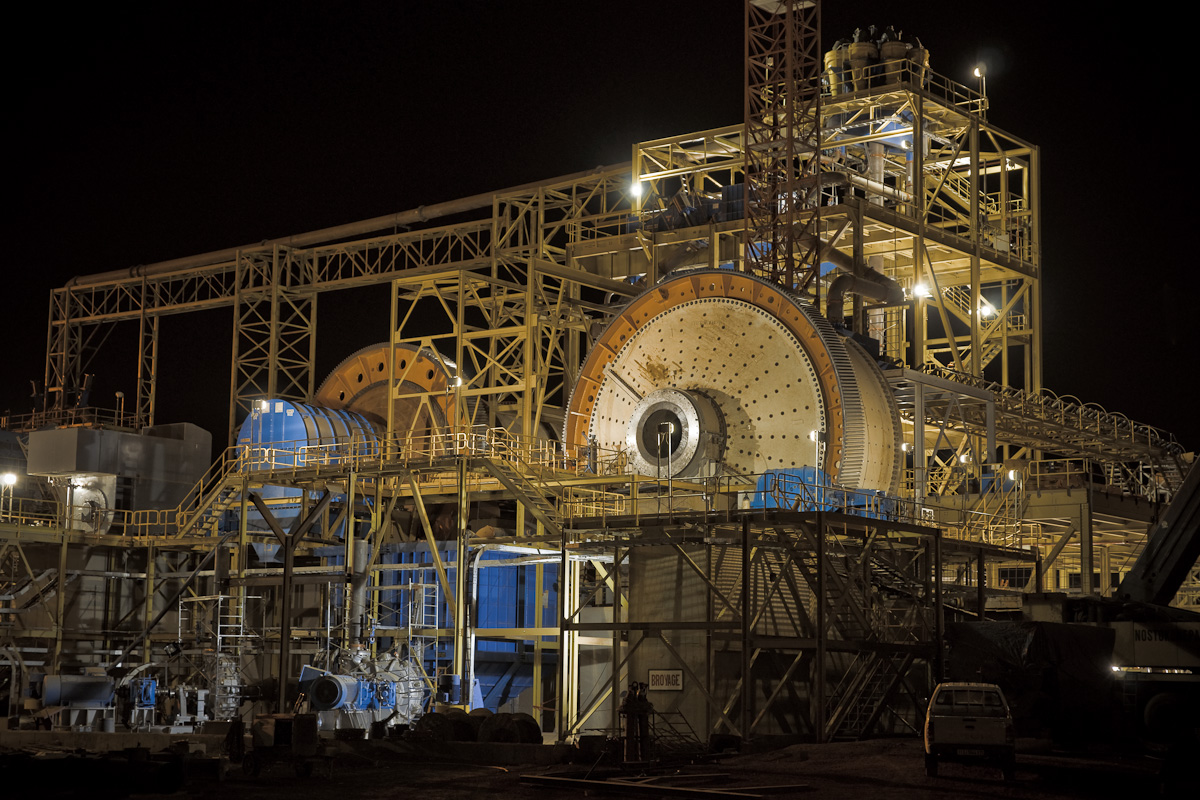
Processing facilities at the Essakane Mine in Burkina Faso

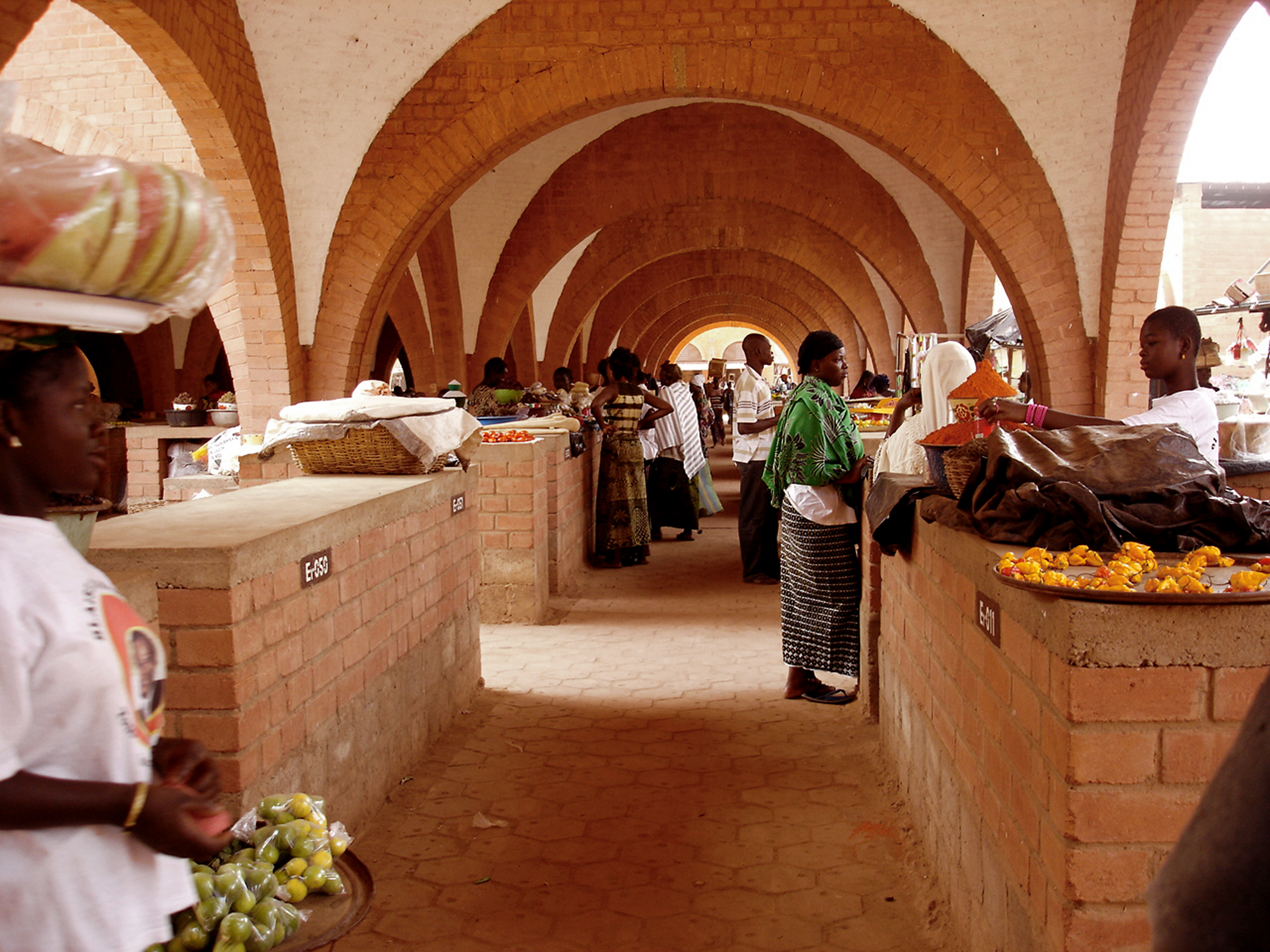
The Grand marché in Koudougou, Burkina Faso

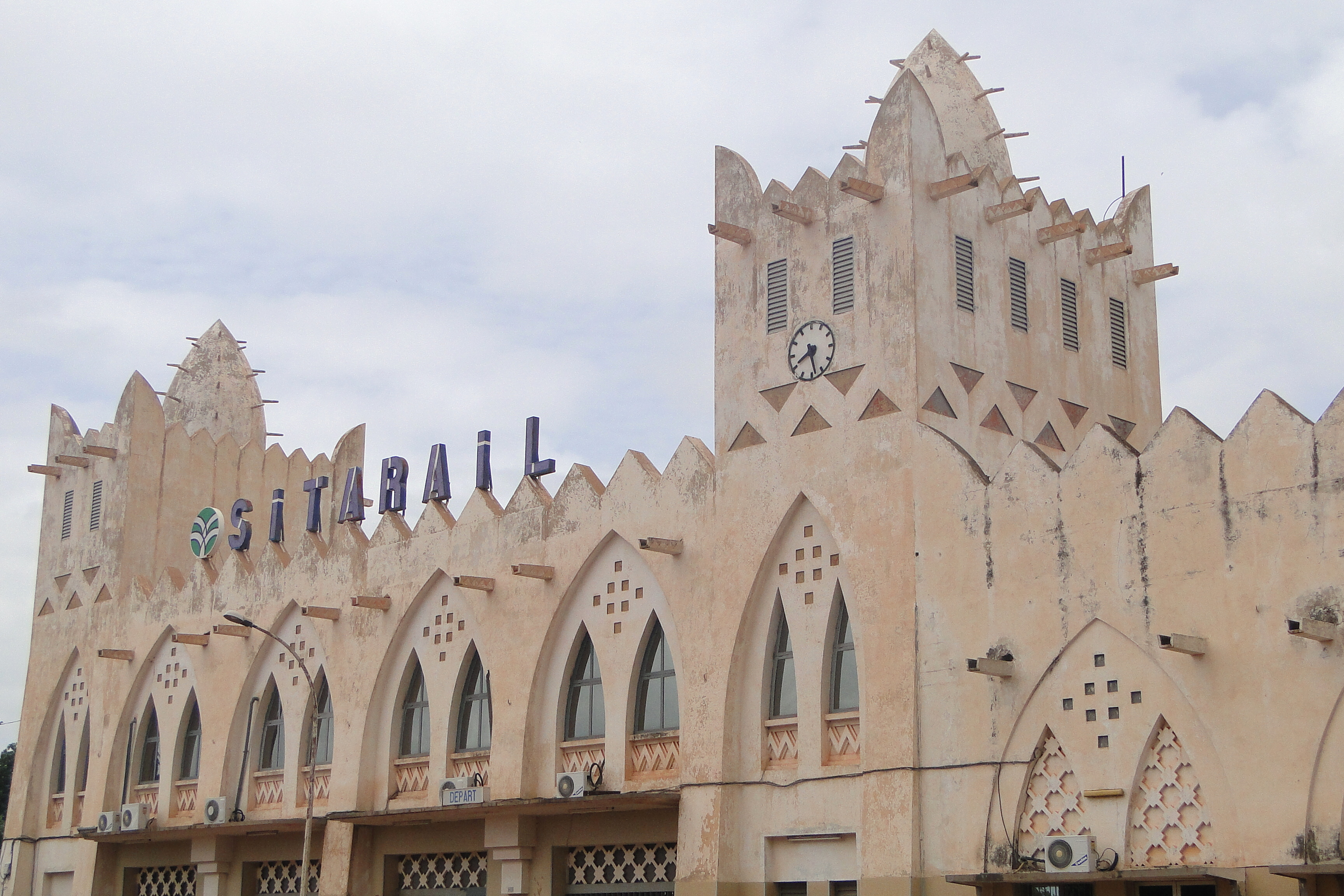
The railway station in Bobo Dioulasso was built during the colonial era and remains in operation.

Burkina Faso remains one of the least developed countries in the world, with an economy based primarily on subsistence farming and livestock raising. The country has an average income purchasing-power-parity per capita of $2,980 and nominal per capita of $1,110 in 2025. More than 80% of the population relies on subsistence agriculture, with only a small fraction directly involved in industry and services. A large part of the economic activity of the country is funded by international aid, despite having gold ores in abundance.

=== Economic overview ===
Burkina Faso's economy showed signs of recovery in recent years. According to the World Bank, the economy grew by 4.9% in 2024 compared to 3.0% in 2023. Real per capita GDP growth also increased from 0.7% to 2.5% over the same period. This acceleration was attributed mainly to the performance of services and agriculture, supported by an improved security situation, favorable weather conditions, and increased government support to the agriculture sector.

Inflation increased in 2024 to 4.2% from 0.7% in 2023, driven by spikes in food prices caused by market speculation linked to a late start to the rainy season. Despite this, the strong growth in the agriculture and services sectors in 2024 reduced the extreme poverty rate by 3 points to 23.2%, with a sharper decline in rural areas. Nevertheless, the absolute number of people living in poverty remains high, exceeding 5.5 million.

The country faces significant economic challenges, including highly variable rainfall patterns, poor soils, lack of adequate communications and other infrastructure, low literacy rate, high population density with few natural resources, and fragile soil conditions.

Key economic indicators for Burkina Faso
Indicator	2023	2024	2025 (est.)
GDP (nominal, billions USD)	19.59	23.98	27.06
GDP (PPP, billions Intl$.)	59.58	67.99	72.82
GDP per capita (nominal, USD)	863	1,005	1,110
GDP per capita (PPP, Intl$.)	2,628	2,851	2,980
GDP growth (%)	3.0	4.9	4.3
Inflation rate (%)	0.7	4.2	-
Population below poverty line (%)	26.2	23.2	-

=== Agriculture ===
Agriculture represents approximately 32% of Burkina Faso's gross domestic product and occupies 80% of the working population. It consists mostly of rearing livestock, especially in the south and southwest, where people grow crops of sorghum, pearl millet, maize (corn), peanuts, rice and cotton, with surpluses to be sold. Cotton is the main cash crop.

=== Mining ===
There is mining of copper, iron, manganese, gold, cassiterite (tin ore), and phosphates. These operations provide employment and generate international aid. Gold production increased 32% in 2011 at six gold mine sites, making Burkina Faso the fourth-largest gold producer in Africa, after South Africa, Mali and Ghana.

Gold accounts for roughly 70% of Burkina Faso's export earnings. With production of 66.9 tons valued at $7.18 billion, gold accounted for an estimated 16% of Burkina Faso's gross domestic product in 2023. Since then, gold production has declined dramatically owing to growing insecurity, which has led to the closure of 7 out of the country's 17 industrial mines (Inata, Taparko, Karma, Boungou, Youga, Nétiana, Yaramoko). The junta has also nationalized five mines. Industrial gold production has subsequently dropped by 20% to 53.4 tons. In 2026, Burkina Faso's first gold refinery opened.

Zabsone et al. (2020) show find that gold extraction increases household expenditures and reduces poverty rates in producing municipalities. Nevertheless, it also increased inequality and child labor.

=== External trade ===
The value of Burkina Faso's exports fell from $2.77 billion in 2011 to $754 million in 2012.

The top five export commodities in 2017 were, in order of importance: gems and precious metals, US$1.9 billion (78.5% of total exports), cotton, $198.7 million (8.3%), ores, slag, ash, $137.6 million (5.8%), fruits, nuts: $76.6 million (3.2%) and oil seeds: $59.5 million (2.5%).

In 2023, exports totaled $5.87 billion while imports were $7.31 billion, resulting in a trade deficit. The current account deficit improved from 8.0% of GDP in 2023 to 6.4% in 2024, due to the rise in gold prices which boosted the value of exports.

=== Economic challenges and outlook ===
The economic outlook for Burkina Faso remains subject to multiple significant risks. The fragile security situation continues to threaten economic gains, with ongoing instability potentially disrupting key sectors. Climate shocks, particularly irregular rainfall patterns, persistently affect agricultural production and food security. Debt refinancing presents substantial challenges, requiring careful management of the country's financial obligations. The financial sector remains vulnerable due to banks' overexposure to the cotton sector, creating systemic risks. Foreign investment has declined precipitously since the military coup, with FDI inflows dropping from $670 million in 2022 to $83 million in 2024, severely limiting capital for development projects.

The World Bank recommends strengthening the mobilisation and efficiency of public resources through several key measures. These include continuous modernisation of the tax administration, broadening of the tax base, optimisation of public spending, improving debt management strategies, and mobilising more concessional financing to support sustainable development.

=== Infrastructure ===
==== Water management ====
The National Office for Water and Sanitation (ONEA), a state-owned utility company operated along commercial lines. A 2011 report by Overseas Development instittute found that ONEA's operational and financial performance had improved substantially and described it as "closing the gap" with the best performing utilities in Africa. The report cited increased autonomy, improved staff productivity, reduced water losses, improved financial reporting, and increased revenue among the factors accompanying its improved performance.

Since 2000, nearly 2 million more people have access to water in the four principal urban centres in the country; the company has kept the quality of infrastructure high (less than 18% of the water is lost through leaks – one of the lowest in sub-Saharan Africa), improved financial reporting, and increased its annual revenue by an average of 12% (well above inflation). Challenges remain, including difficulties among some customers in paying for services, with the need to rely on international aid to expand its infrastructure. The state-owned, commercially run venture has helped the nation reach its Millennium Development Goal (MDG) targets in water-related areas, and has grown as a viable company.

However, access to drinking water has improved over the last 28 years. According to UNICEF, access to drinking water has increased from 39 to 76% in rural areas between 1990 and 2015. In this same time span, access to drinking water increased from 75 to 97% in urban areas.

==== Energy ====
Access to electricity remains limited in Burkina Faso, with a rate well below the regional average. This situation constitutes a major obstacle to inclusive growth and reduces economic opportunities for a large part of the population, particularly in rural areas.

A 33-megawatt solar power plant in Zagtouli, near Ouagadougou, came online in late November 2017. At the time of its construction, it was the largest solar power facility in West Africa.

==== Transport ====
Transport in Burkina Faso is limited by relatively underdeveloped infrastructure.

As of June 2014 the main international airport, Ouagadougou Airport, had regularly scheduled flights to many destinations in West Africa as well as Paris, Brussels and Istanbul. The other international airport, Bobo Dioulasso Airport, has flights to Ouagadougou and Abidjan.

Rail transport in Burkina Faso consists of a single line which runs from Kaya to Abidjan in Ivory Coast via Ouagadougou, Koudougou, Bobo Dioulasso and Banfora. Sitarail operates a passenger train three times a week along the route.

There are 15,000 kilometres of roads in Burkina Faso, of which 2,500 kilometres are paved.

=== Science and technology ===
In 2009, Burkina Faso spent 0.20% of GDP on research and development (R&D), one of the lowest ratios in West Africa. There were 48 researchers (in full-time equivalents) per million inhabitants in 2010, which is more than twice the average for sub-Saharan Africa (20 per million population in 2013) and higher than the ratio for Ghana and Nigeria (39). It is, however, much lower than the ratio for Senegal (361 per million inhabitants). In Burkina Faso in 2010, 46% of researchers were working in the health sector, 16% in engineering, 13% in natural sciences, 9% in agricultural sciences, 7% in the humanities and 4% in social sciences.

In January 2011, the government created the Ministry of Scientific Research and Innovation. Up until then, management of science, technology and innovation had fallen under the Department of Secondary and Higher Education and Scientific Research. Within this ministry, the Directorate General for Research and Sector Statistics is responsible for planning. A separate body, the Directorate General of Scientific Research, Technology and Innovation, coordinates research. This is a departure from the pattern in many other West African countries where a single body fulfills both functions. The move signals the government's intention to make science and technology a development priority. Burkina Faso was ranked 126th in the Global Innovation Index in 2025.

=== International relations ===
Burkina Faso is part of the West African Monetary and Economic Union (UMEOA) and has adopted the CFA franc. This is issued by the Central Bank of the West African States (BCEAO), situated in Dakar, Senegal. The BCEAO manages the monetary and reserve policy of the member states, and provides regulation and oversight of financial sector and banking activity. A legal framework regarding licensing, bank activities, organisational and capital requirements, inspections and sanctions (all applicable to all countries of the Union) is in place, having been reformed significantly in 1999. Microfinance institutions are governed by a separate law, which regulates microfinance activities in all WAEMU countries. The insurance sector is regulated through the Inter-African Conference on Insurance Markets (CIMA).

Burkina Faso is a member of the Organization for the Harmonization of Business Law in Africa (OHADA). The country also belongs to the United Nations, International Monetary Fund, World Bank, and World Trade Organization.

== Demographics ==
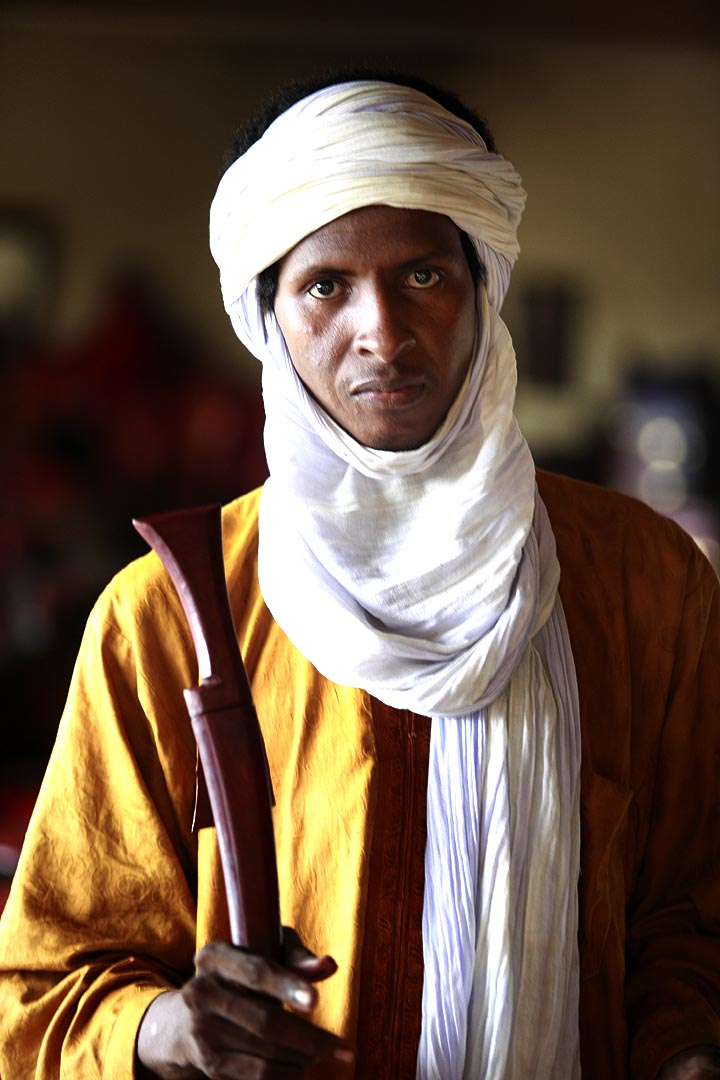
A Burkinabè Tuareg man in Ouagadougou

Population
Year	Million
1950	4.3
2000	11.6
2021	22.1

Burkina Faso is an ethnically integrated, secular state where most people are concentrated in the south and centre, where their density sometimes exceeds 48 inhabitants per square kilometre (120/sq mi). Hundreds of thousands of Burkinabè migrate regularly to Ivory Coast and Ghana, mainly for seasonal agricultural work. These flows of workers are affected by external events; the September 2002 coup attempt in Ivory Coast and the ensuing fighting meant that hundreds of thousands of Burkinabè returned to Burkina Faso. The regional economy suffered when they were unable to work.

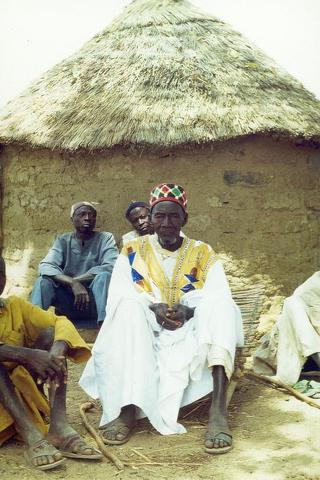
Mossi people in Dourtenga Department

The total fertility rate of Burkina Faso was estimated to be 4.02 children born per woman in 2024, the 23rd highest in the world.

In 2009 the U.S. Department of State's Trafficking in Persons Report reported that slavery in Burkina Faso continued to exist and that Burkinabè children were often the victims. Slavery in the Sahel states in general, is an entrenched institution with a long history that dates back to the trans-Saharan slave trade. In 2018, an estimated 82,000 people in the country were living under "modern slavery" according to the Global Slavery Index.

Largest cities or towns in Burkina Faso According to the 2019 Census
Rank	Name	Region	Pop.
1	Ouagadougou	Centre	2,415,266
2	Bobo-Dioulasso	Hauts-Bassins	904,920
3	Koudougou	Centre-Ouest	160,239
4	Saaba	Centre	136,011
5	Ouahigouya	Nord	124,587
6	Kaya	Centre-Nord	121,970
7	Banfora	Cascades	117,452
8	Pouytenga	Centre-Est	96,469
9	Houndé	Hauts-Bassins	87,151
10	Fada N'gourma	Est	73,200

=== Ethnic groups ===
Burkina Faso's 23 million people belong to two major West African ethnic cultural groups: the Voltaic and the Mandé (whose common language is Dioula). The Voltaic Mossi make up about one-half of the population. The Mossi claim descent from warriors who migrated to present-day Burkina Faso from northern Ghana around 1100 AD. They established an empire that lasted more than 800 years. Predominantly farmers, the Mossi kingdom is led by the Mogho Naba, whose court is in Ouagadougou. There are approximately 5,000 Europeans.

=== Languages ===
Native Languages in Burkina Faso
Languages	percent
Mooré	40.5%
Fula	9.3%
Gourmanche	6.1%
Bambara	4.9%
Bissa	3.2%
Bwamu	2.1%
Dagara	2%
San	1.9%
Lobiri	1.8%
Lyele	1.7%
Bobo	1.4%
Senoufo	1.4%
Nuni	1.2%
Dafing	1.1%
Tamasheq	1%
Kassem	0.7%
Gouin	0.4%
Dogon	0.3%
Songhai	0.3%
Gourounsi	0.3%
Ko	0.1%
Koussasse	0.1%
Sembla	0.1%
Siamou	0.1%
Other National	5%
Other African	0.2%
French	1.3%
Other non-indigenous	0.1%

Burkina Faso is a multilingual country. The working languages are French, which was introduced during the colonial period, and English. In December 2023, due to deteriorating relations between Burkina Faso and the French government, the Burkina Faso government announced it was elevating national languages to the status of official languages. French was dropped as an official language, becoming a working language with English instead. The 2024 transitional charter adopted under President Traoré mentions "all national languages of Burkina Faso" would serve as the country's official languages. The charter does not name any of those official or national languages.

An estimated 69 languages are spoken in the country, of which about 60 languages are indigenous. The Mooré language is the most spoken language in Burkina Faso, spoken by about half the population, mainly in the central region around the capital, Ouagadougou.

In 2006, the languages spoken natively in Burkina Faso were Mooré by 40.5% of the population, Fula by 9.3%, Gourmanché by 6.1%, Bambara by 4.9%, Bissa by 3.2%, Bwamu by 2.1%, Dagara by 2%, San by 1.9%, Lobiri with 1.8%, Lyélé with 1.7%, Bobo and Sénoufo with 1.4% each, Nuni by 1.2%, Dafing by 1.1%, Tamasheq by 1%, Kassem by 0.7%, Gouin by 0.4%, Dogon, Songhai, and Gourounsi by 0.3% each, Ko, Koussassé, Sembla, and Siamou by 0.1% each, other national languages by 5%, other African languages by 0.2%, French (an official language at the time) by 1.3%, and other non-indigenous languages by 0.1%.

In the west, Mandé languages are widely spoken, the most predominant being Dyula (also known as Jula or Dioula), others including Bobo, Samo, and Marka. Fula is widespread, particularly in the north. Gourmanché is spoken in the east, while Bissa is spoken in the south.

=== Religion ===
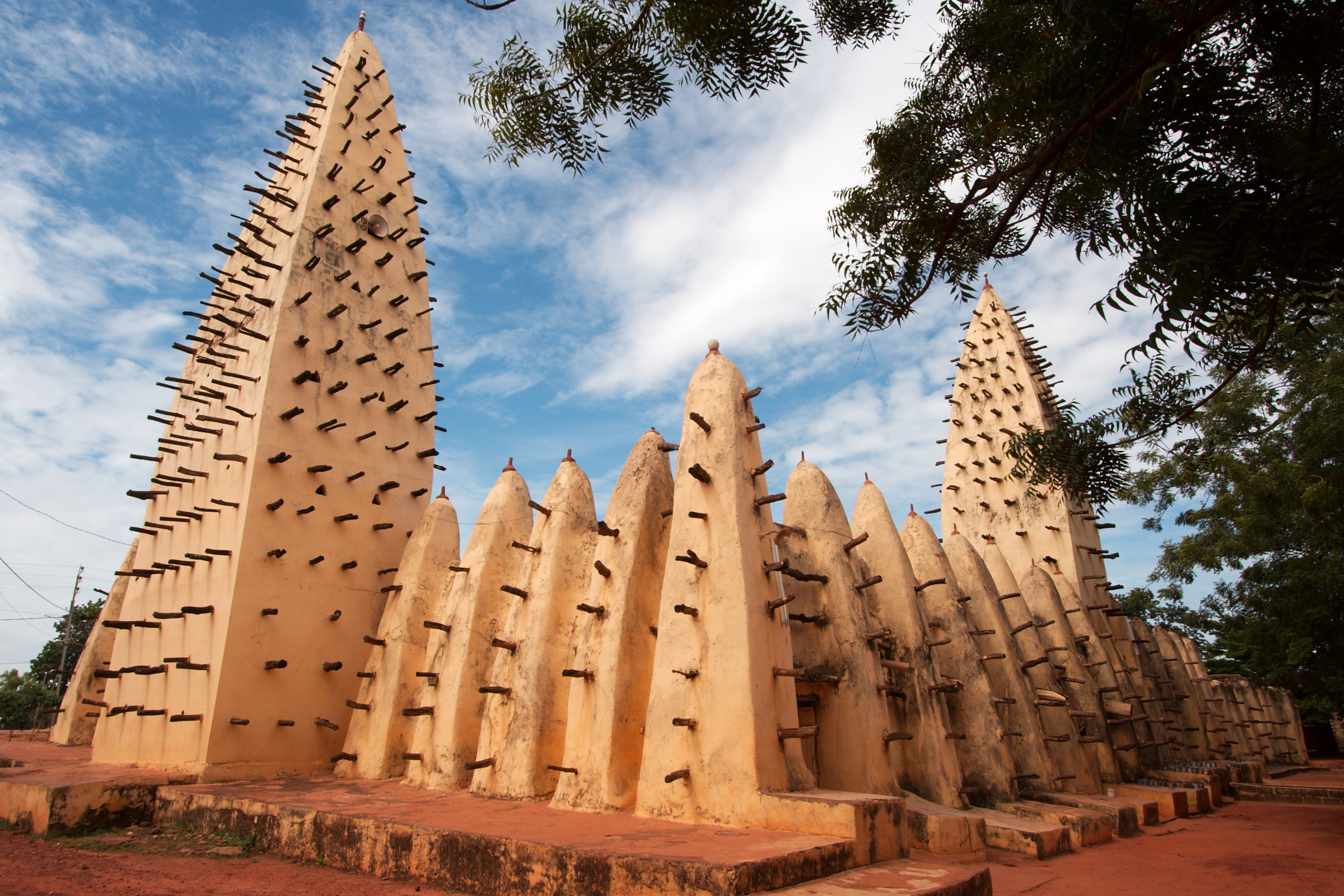
The Grand Mosque of Bobo-Dioulasso

The government of Burkina Faso's 2019 census reported that 63.8% of the population practiced Islam, and that the majority of this group belong to the Sunni branch, while a small minority adheres to Shia Islam. A significant number of Sunni Muslims identify with the Tijaniyah Sufi order.

The 2019 census also found that 26.3% of the population were Christians (20.1% being Roman Catholics and 6.2% members of Protestant denominations) and 9.0% followed traditional indigenous beliefs such as the Dogon religion, 0.2% followed other religions, and 0.7% were non-religious.

Animists are the largest religious group in the country's Sud-Ouest region, forming 48.1% of its total population.

=== Health ===
In 2016, the average life expectancy was estimated at 60 for males and 61 for females. In 2018, the under-five mortality rate and the infant mortality rate was 76 per 1000 live births. In 2024, the median age of its inhabitants was 18 and the estimated population growth rate was 2.4%.

In 2011, health expenditures was 6.5% of GDP; the maternal mortality ratio was estimated at 300 deaths per 100000 live births and the physician density at 0.05 per 1000 population in 2010. In 2012, it was estimated that the adult HIV prevalence rate (ages 15–49) was 1.0%. In 2011, HIV prevalence was declining among pregnant women who attend antenatal clinics. In 2005, an estimated 72.5% of Burkina Faso's girls and women had undergone female genital mutilation, administered according to traditional rituals.

Central government spending on health was 3% in 2001. As of 2009, studies estimated there were as few as 10 physicians per 100,000 people. There were 41 nurses and 13 midwives per 100,000 people. Demographic and Health Surveys has completed three surveys in Burkina Faso since 1993, and had another in 2009.

In the 2024 Global Hunger Index (GHI), Burkina Faso ranks 98th out of 127 countries and has a serious level of hunger.

=== Education ===
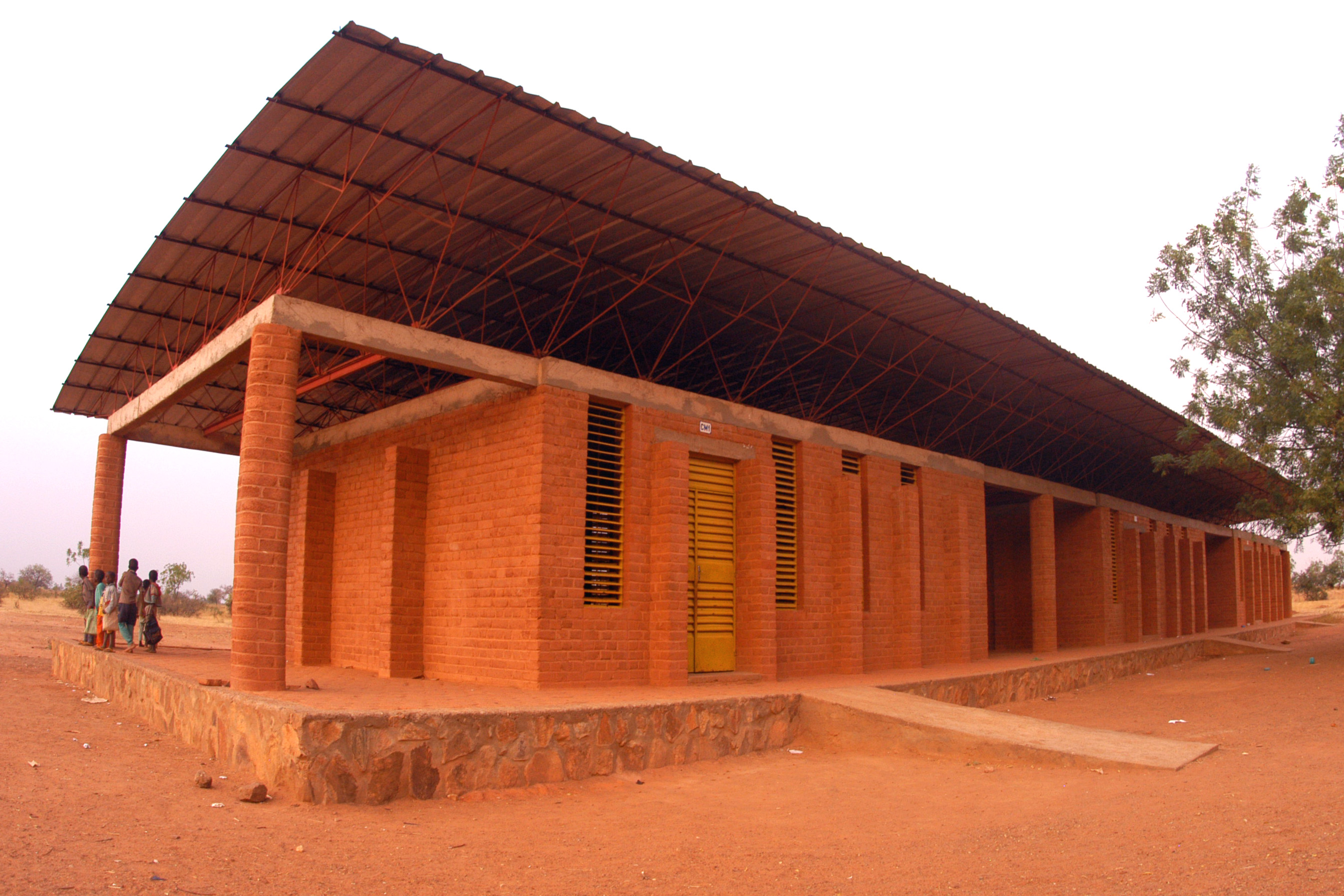
The Gando primary school, designed by Diébédo Francis Kéré. The innovative clay/cement hybrid structure provides thermal protection and natural ventilation, addressing characteristic problems of educational buildings in the region. Kéré received the Aga Khan Award for Architecture in 2004 for this design.

Education in Burkina Faso is divided into primary, secondary and higher education. The Education Act makes schooling compulsory from age 6 to 16, with French as the official language of instruction.

By law, education is free, but the government lacks adequate resources to provide universal free primary education. Children must pay for school supplies, and communities are often responsible for constructing primary school buildings and teachers' housing. Children from poor families can receive tuition-free education through junior high and high school if their grades qualify.

High school costs approximately CFA 25,000 (US$50) per year, which is far above the means of most Burkinabè families. Boys receive preference in schooling; as such, girls' education and literacy rates are far lower than their male counterparts’. An increase in girls' schooling has been observed because of the government's policy of making school cheaper for girls and granting them more scholarships.

To proceed from primary to middle school, middle to high school or high school to college, national exams must be passed. Institutions of higher education include the University of Ouagadougou, The Polytechnic University of Bobo-Dioulasso, and the University of Koudougou, which is also a teacher training institution. There are some small private colleges in the capital city of Ouagadougou but these are affordable to only a small portion of the population.

Higher education provision is highly centralised in Ouagadougou. The University of Ouagadougou had around 40,000 students (83% of the national population of university students) in 2010/2011, the University of Koudougou had 5,600 students, and the Polytechnic University of Bobo-Dioulasso had 2,600. The private universities each had less than 1,000 students. Supervision rates vary significantly between institutions - at the University of Ouagadougou there is one lecturer for every 24 students, while at The Polytechnic University of Bobo-Dioulasso there is one lecturer for every three students.

As of 2023, the gross enrollment ratio for tertiary education among males was reported at 12.1%. The gross enrollment ratio represents the ratio of total enrollment, regardless of age, to the population of the age group that officially corresponds to the level of education shown.

There is also the International School of Ouagadougou (ISO), an American-based private school located in Ouagadougou.

The 2008 UN Development Program Report ranked Burkina Faso as the country with the lowest level of literacy in the world, despite a concerted effort to double its literacy rate from 12.8% in 1990 to 25.3% in 2008.

== Food insecurity ==
According to the Global Hunger Index, a multidimensional tool used to measure and track a country's hunger levels, Burkina Faso ranked 65 out of 78 countries in 2013. It is estimated that there are currently over 1.5 million children who are at risk of food insecurity in Burkina Faso, with around 350,000 children who are in need of emergency medical assistance. However, only about a third of these children will actually receive adequate medical attention. Only 11.4 percent of children under the age of two receive the daily recommended number of meals. Stunted growth as a result of food insecurity is a severe problem in Burkina Faso, affecting at least a third of the population from 2008 to 2012. Additionally, stunted children, on average, tend to complete less school than children with normal growth development, further contributing to the low levels of education of the Burkina Faso population.

The European Commission expects that approximately 500,000 children under age 5 in Burkina Faso will suffer from acute malnutrition in 2015, including around 149,000 who will suffer from its most life-threatening form. Rates of micronutrient deficiencies are also high. According to the Demographic and Health Survey (DHS 2010), 49 percent of women and 88 percent of children under the age of five suffer from anemia. Forty percent of infant deaths can be attributed to malnutrition, and in turn, these infant mortality rates have decreased Burkina Faso's total work force by 13.6 percent, demonstrating how food security affects more aspects of life beyond health.

These high rates of food insecurity and the accompanying effects are even more prevalent in rural populations compared to urban ones, as access to health services in rural areas is much more limited and awareness and education of children's nutritional needs is lower.

An October 2018 report by USAid stated that droughts and floods remained problematic, and that "violence and insecurity are disrupting markets, trade and livelihoods activities in some parts of Burkina Faso's northern and eastern areas". The report estimated that over 954,300 people needed food security support, and that, according to UNICEF, an "estimated 187,200 children under 5 years of age will experience severe acute malnutrition". Agencies providing assistance at the time included USAID's Office of Food for Peace (FFP) working with the UN World Food Programme, the NGO Oxfam Intermón and ACDI/VOCA.

=== Approaches to improving food security ===
==== World Food Programme ====
The United Nations' World Food Programme has worked on programs that are geared towards increasing food security in Burkina Faso. The Protracted Relief and Recovery Operation 200509 (PRRO) was formed to respond to the high levels of malnutrition in Burkina Faso, following the food and nutrition crisis in 2012. The efforts of this project are mostly geared towards the treatment and prevention of malnutrition and include take home rations for the caretakers of those children who are being treated for malnutrition. Additionally, the activities of this operation contribute to families' abilities to withstand future food crises. Better nutrition among the two most vulnerable groups, young children and pregnant women, prepares them to be able to respond better in times when food security is compromised, such as in droughts.

The Country Programme (CP) has two parts: food and nutritional assistance to people with HIV/AIDS, and a school feeding program for all primary schools in the Sahel region. The HIV/AIDS nutrition program aims to better the nutritional recovery of those who are living with HIV/AIDS and to protect at-risk children and orphans from malnutrition and food security. As part of the school feeding component, the Country Programme's goals are to increase enrollment and attendance in schools in the Sahel region, where enrollment rates are below the national average. Furthermore, the program aims at improving gender parity rates in these schools, by providing girls with high attendance in the last two years of primary school with take-home rations of cereals as an incentive to households, encouraging them to send their girls to school.

The WFP concluded the formation of a subsequently approved plan in August 2018 "to support the Government's vision of 'a democratic, unified and united nation, transforming the structure of its economy and achieving a strong and inclusive growth through patterns of sustainable consumption and production.' It will take important steps in WFP's new strategic direction for strengthened national and local capacities to enable the Government and communities to own, manage, and implement food and nutrition security programmes by 2030".

In April 2026, India sent one thousand metric tonnes of rice to Burkina Faso as humanitarian assistance, to support food security for vulnerable communities and internally displaced persons.

==== World Bank ====
One of the main projects the World Bank is working on to reduce food insecurity in Burkina Faso is the Agricultural Productivity and Food Security Project. According to the World Bank, the objective of this project is to "improve the capacity of poor producers to increase food production and to ensure improved availability of food products in rural markets." The Agricultural Productivity and Food Security Project has three main parts. Its first component is to work towards the improvement of food production, including financing grants and providing 'voucher for work' programs for households that cannot pay their contribution in cash.

The project's next component involves improving the availability of food products, particularly in rural areas. This includes supporting the marketing of food products and aims to strengthen the capabilities of stakeholders to control the variability of food products and supplies at local and national levels. Lastly, the third component of this project focuses on institutional development and capacity building. Its goal is to reinforce the capacities of service providers and institutions that are specifically involved in project implementation. The project's activities aim to build capacities of service providers, strengthen the capacity of food producer organisations, strengthen agricultural input supply delivery methods, and manage and evaluate project activities.

The December 2018 report by the World Bank indicated that the poverty rate fell slightly between 2009 and 2014, from 46% to a still high 40.1%. The report provided this updated summary of the country's development challenges: "Burkina Faso remains vulnerable to climatic shocks related to changes in rainfall patterns and to fluctuations in the prices of its export commodities on world markets. Its economic and social development will, to some extent, be contingent on political stability in the country and the sub-regions, its openness to international trade, and export diversification".

== Culture ==
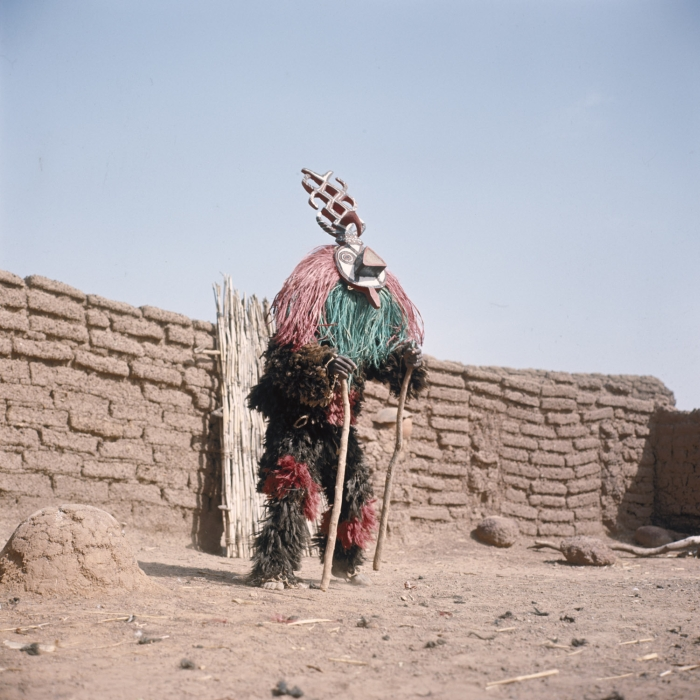
A masked Winiama dancer, c. 1970

Literature in Burkina Faso is based on the oral tradition, which remains important. In 1934, during French occupation, Dim-Dolobsom Ouedraogo published his Maximes, pensées et devinettes mossi (Maxims, Thoughts and Riddles of the Mossi), a record of the oral history of the Mossi people.

The oral tradition continued to have an influence on Burkinabè writers in the post-independence Burkina Faso of the 1960s, such as Nazi Boni and Roger Nikiema. The 1960s saw a growth in the number of playwrights being published. Since the 1970s, literature has developed in Burkina Faso with many more writers being published.

The theatre of Burkina Faso combines traditional Burkinabè performance with the colonial influences and post-colonial efforts to educate rural people to produce a distinctive national theatre. Traditional ritual ceremonies of the many ethnic groups in Burkina Faso have long involved dancing with masks. Western-style theatre became common during colonial times, heavily influenced by French theatre. With independence came a new style of theatre inspired by forum theatre aimed at educating and entertaining Burkina Faso's rural people.

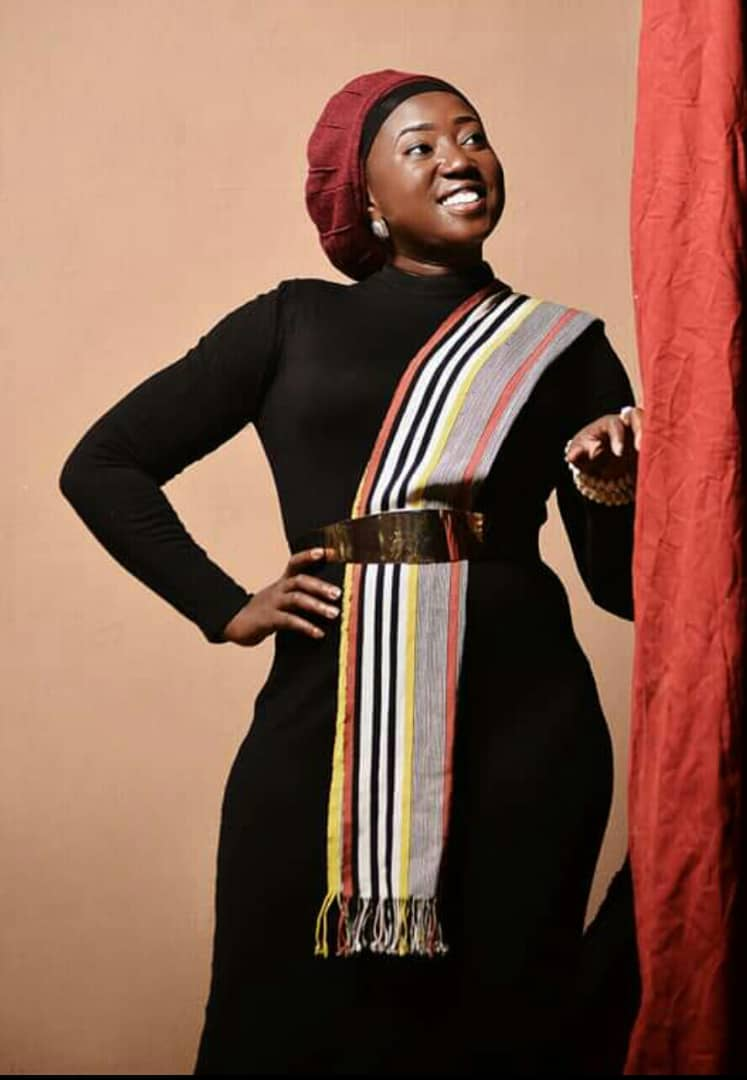
Malika Outtara, poet

Slam poetry is increasing in popularity in the country, in part due to the efforts of slam poet Malika Outtara. She uses her skills to raise awareness around issues such as blood donation, albinism and the impact of COVID-19.

=== Arts and crafts ===
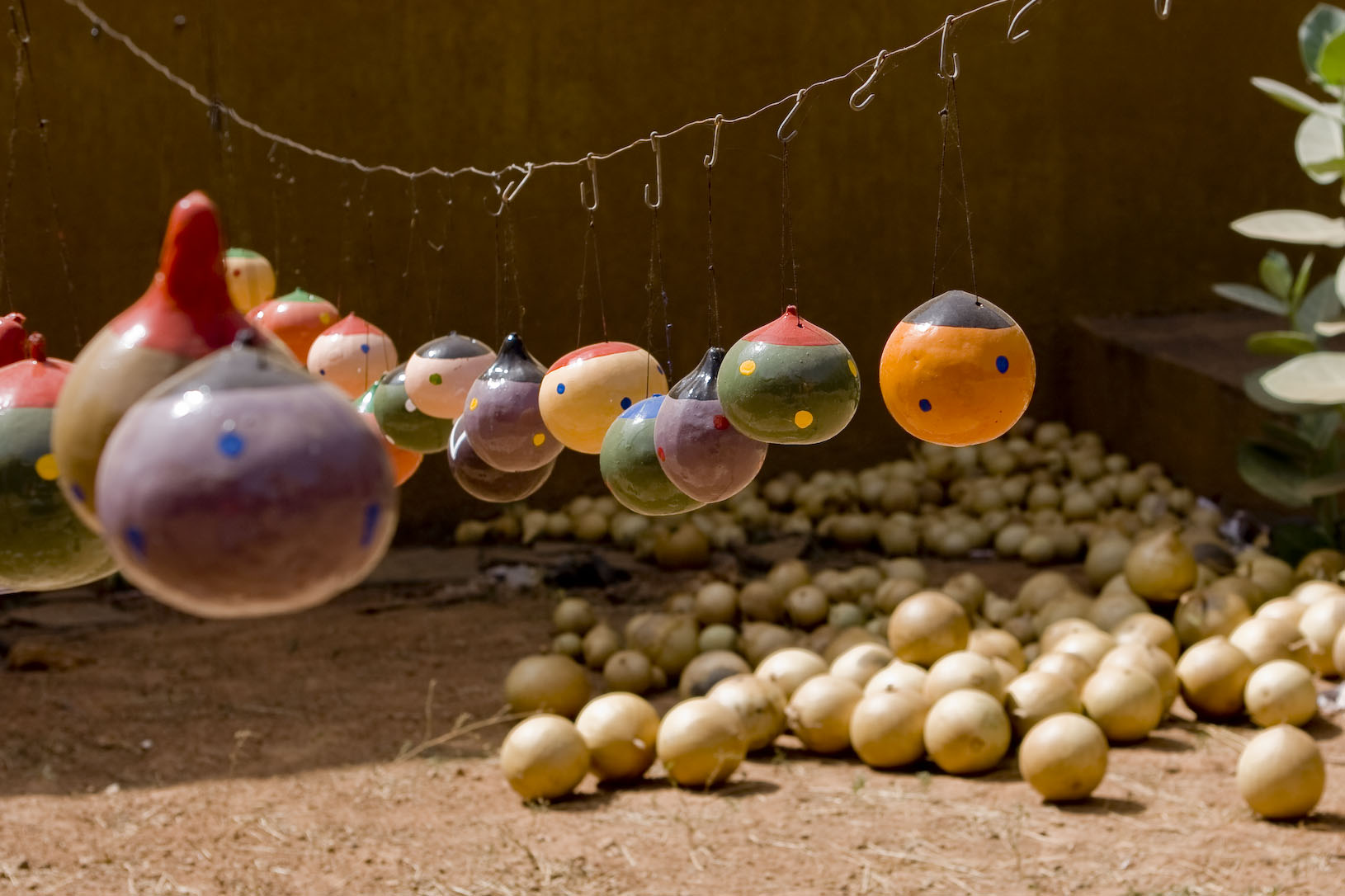
Artisan garland of decorative painted gourds in Ouagadougou

In addition to several rich traditional artistic heritages among the peoples, there is a large artist community in Burkina Faso, especially in Ouagadougou. Much of the crafts produced are for the country's growing tourist industry.

Burkina Faso also hosts the International Art and Craft Fair, Ouagadougou. It is better known by its French name as SIAO, Le Salon International de l' Artisanat de Ouagadougou, and is one of the most important African handicraft fairs.

=== Music ===
The music of Burkina Faso includes the folk music of 60 different ethnic groups. The Mossi people, centrally located around Ouagadougou, account for 40% of the population while, to the south, Gurunsi, Gurma, Dagaaba and Lobi populations, speaking Gur languages closely related to the Mossi language, extend into the coastal states. In the north and east the Fulani of the Sahel preponderate, while in the south and west the Mande languages are common; Samo, Bissa, Bobo, Senufo and Marka. Burkinabé traditional music has continued to thrive and musical output remains quite diverse. Popular music is mostly in French. Burkina Faso has yet to produce a major pan-African success.

=== Media ===
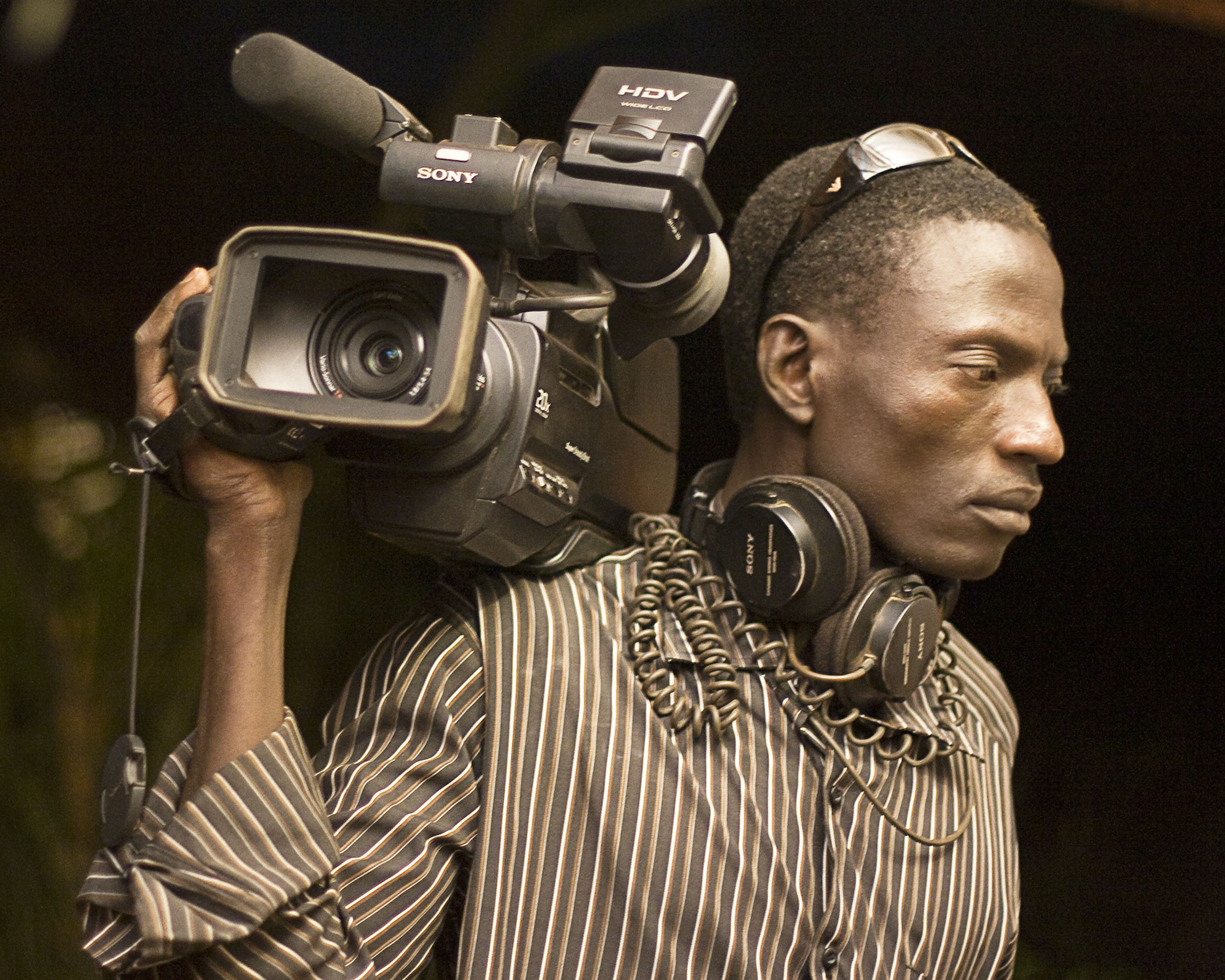
A cameraman in Ouagadougou in 2010

The nation's principal media outlet is its state-sponsored combined television and radio service, Radio Télévision du Burkina (RTB). RTB broadcasts on two medium-wave (AM) and several FM frequencies. Besides RTB, there are privately owned sports, cultural, music, and religious FM radio stations. RTB maintains a worldwide short-wave news broadcast (Radio Nationale Burkina) in the French language from Ouagadougou using a 100 kW transmitter on 4.815 and 5.030 MHz.

Attempts to develop an independent press and media in Burkina Faso have been intermittent. In 1998, investigative journalist Norbert Zongo, his brother Ernest, his driver, and another man were assassinated by unknown assailants, and the bodies burned. The crime was never solved. However, an independent Commission of Inquiry later concluded that Norbert Zongo was killed for political reasons because of his investigative work into the death of David Ouedraogo, a chauffeur who worked for François Compaoré, President Blaise Compaoré's brother.

In January 1999, François Compaoré was charged with the murder of David Ouedraogo, who had died as a result of torture in January 1998. The charges were later dropped by a military tribunal after an appeal. In August 2000, five members of the President's personal security guard detail (Régiment de la Sécurité Présidentielle, or RSP) were charged with the murder of Ouedraogo. RSP members Marcel Kafando, Edmond Koama, and Ousseini Yaro, investigated as suspects in the Norbert Zongo assassination, were convicted in the Ouedraogo case and sentenced to lengthy prison terms. Because of his role in the Zongo affair, François Compaoré was arrested on 29 October 2017 by French police on his return from Abidjan. His extradition to Burkina Faso was annulled by the ECHR, following an appeal lodged by his lawyer François-Henri Briard.

Since the death of Norbert Zongo, several protests regarding the Zongo investigation and treatment of journalists have been prevented or dispersed by government police and security forces. In April 2007, popular radio reggae host Karim Sama, whose programs feature reggae songs interspersed with critical commentary on alleged government injustice and corruption, received several death threats.

Sama's personal car was later burned outside the private radio station Ouaga FM by unknown vandals. In response, the Committee to Protect Journalists (CPJ) wrote to President Compaoré to request his government investigate the sending of e-mailed death threats to journalists and radio commentators in Burkina Faso who were critical of the government. In December 2008, police in Ouagadougou questioned leaders of a protest march that called for a renewed investigation into the unsolved Zongo assassination. Among the marchers was Jean-Claude Meda, the president of the Association of Journalists of Burkina Faso.

=== Cinema ===
The cinema of Burkina Faso is an important part of the West African film industry and African film as a whole. Burkina's contribution to African cinema started with the establishment of the film festival FESPACO (Festival Panafricain du Cinéma et de la Télévision de Ouagadougou), which was launched as a film week in 1969. Many of the nation's filmmakers are known internationally and have won international prizes.

For many years the headquarters of the Pan African Federation of Filmmakers (FEPACI) was in Ouagadougou, rescued in 1983 from a period of moribund inactivity by the enthusiastic support and funding of President Sankara. (In 2006 the Secretariat of FEPACI moved to South Africa, but the headquarters of the organisation is still in Ouagadougou.) Among the best known directors from Burkina Faso are Gaston Kaboré, Idrissa Ouedraogo, and Dani Kouyate. Burkina produces popular television series such as Les Bobodiouf. Internationally known filmmakers such as Ouedraogo, Kabore, Yameogo, and Kouyate make popular television series.

=== Cuisine ===
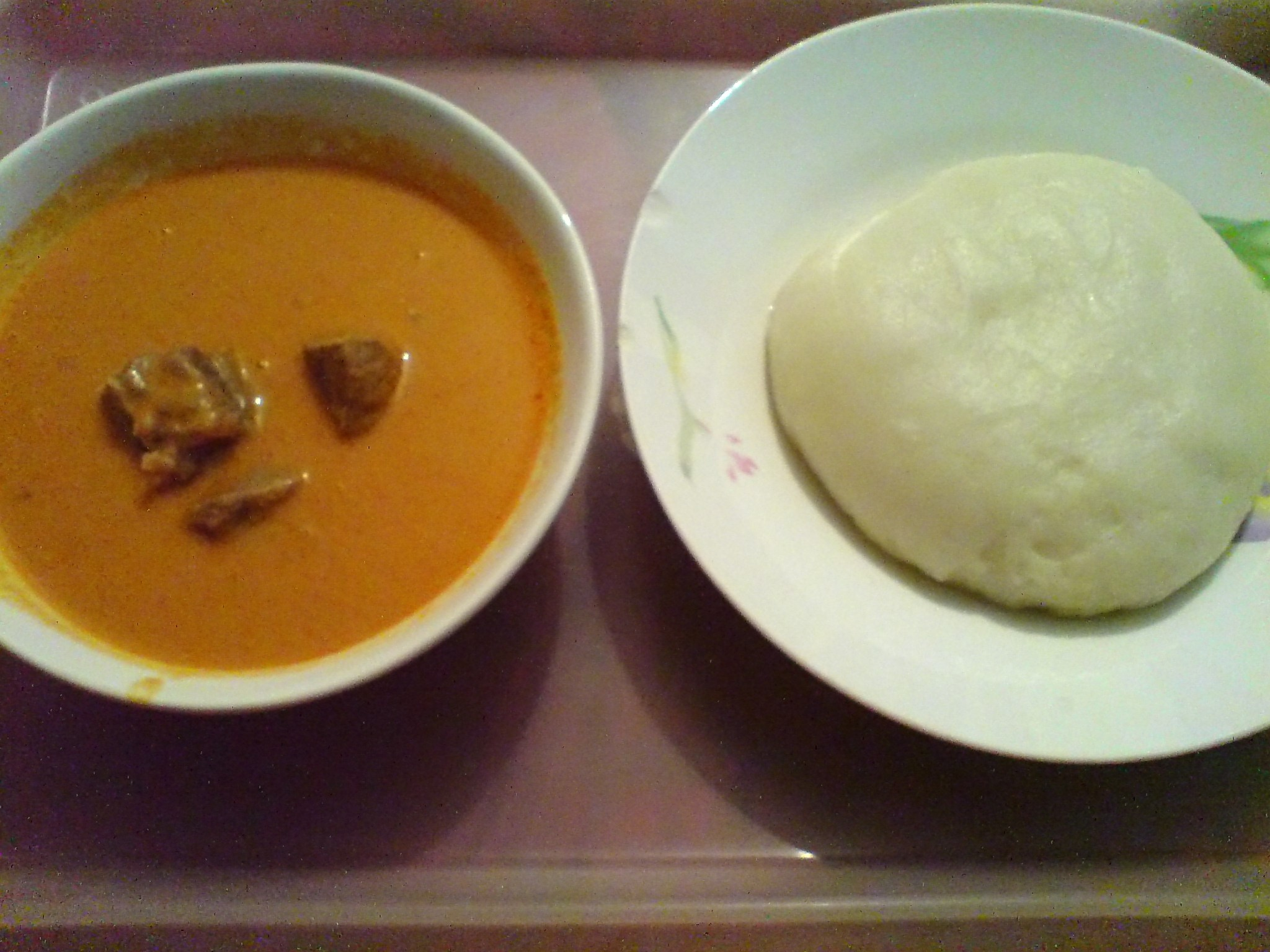
A plate of fufu (right) accompanied with peanut soup

Typical of West African cuisine, Burkina Faso's cuisine is based on staple foods of sorghum, millet, rice, maize, peanuts, potatoes, beans, yams and okra. The most common sources of animal protein are chicken, chicken eggs and freshwater fish. A typical Burkinabè beverage is banji or palm wine, which is fermented palm sap; and zoom-kom, or "grain water", is purportedly the national drink of Burkina Faso. Zoom-kom is milky-looking and whitish, having a water and cereal base, and often drunk with ice cubes. In the more rural regions, in the outskirts of Burkina, dolo, a drink made from fermented millet, may be found. In times of crisis, zamnè, a legume native to Burkina, can be served as a main dish or in a sauce.

=== Cultural festivals and events ===
Every two years, Ouagadougou hosts the Panafrican Film and Television Festival of Ouagadougou (FESPACO), the largest African cinema festival on the continent (February, odd years).

Held every two years since 1988, the International Art and Craft Fair, Ouagadougou (SIAO) is one of Africa's most important trade shows for art and handicrafts (late October-early November, even years).

Also, every two years, the Symposium de sculpture sur granit de Laongo takes place on a site located about 35 kilometres (22 miles) from Ouagadougou in the province of Oubritenga.

The National Culture Week of Burkina Faso, better known by its French name La semaine nationale de la culture (SNC), is one of the most important cultural activities of Burkina Faso. It is a biennial event which takes place every two years in Bobo Dioulasso, the second-largest city in the country.

The Festival International des Masques et des Arts (FESTIMA), celebrating traditional masks, is held every two years in Dédougou.

=== Sports ===
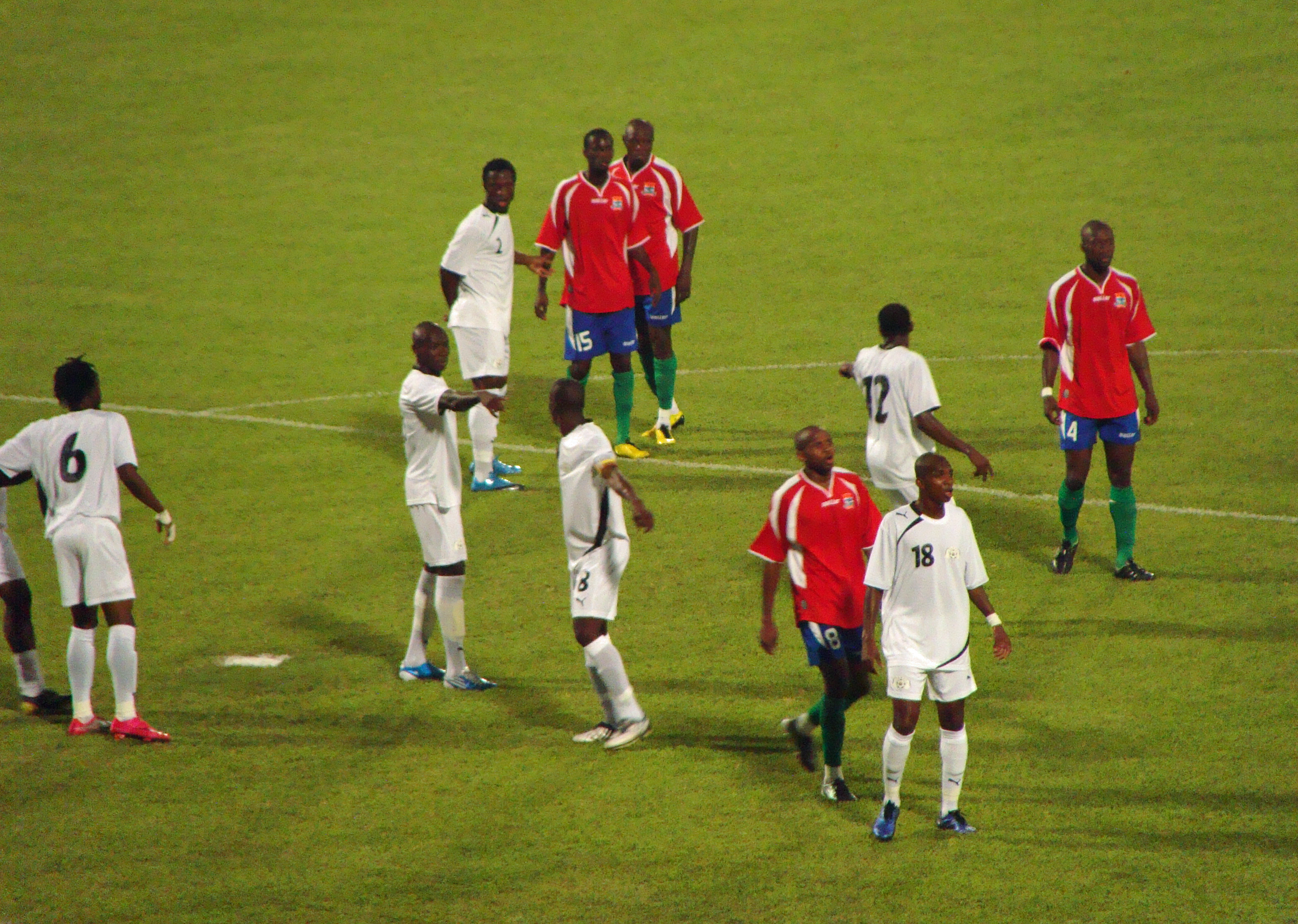
The Burkina Faso national football team in white during a match

Sport in Burkina Faso is widespread and includes football, basketball, cycling, rugby union, handball, tennis, boxing and martial arts. Football is the most popular sport in Burkina Faso, played both professionally, and informally in towns and villages across the country. The national team is nicknamed "Les Etalons" ("the Stallions") in reference to the legendary horse of Princess Yennenga.

In 1998, Burkina Faso hosted the Africa Cup of Nations for which the Omnisport Stadium in Bobo-Dioulasso was built. Burkina Faso qualified for the 2013 African Cup of Nations in South Africa and reached the final, but then lost to Nigeria 0–1. The country has never qualified for a FIFA World Cup.

Basketball is another sport which enjoys much popularity for both men and women. The country's men's national team had its most successful year in 2013 when it qualified for the AfroBasket, the continent's prime basketball event.

At the 2020 Summer Olympics, the athlete Hugues Fabrice Zango won Burkina Faso's first Olympic medal, winning bronze in the men's triple jump. Zango also won the gold medal in the triple jump at the 2023 world championships. Cricket is also picking up in Burkina Faso with Cricket Burkina Faso running a ten-club league.

== See also ==
- Outline of Burkina Faso

== Bibliography ==
- Rupley, Lawrence; Bangali, Lamissa & Diamitani, Boureima (2013). Historical Dictionary of Burkina Faso. The Scarecrow Press. ISBN 978-0-8108-6770-3.
