= Burkinabe =

Burkinabe (Fulfulde: Burkinabè, French: burkinabè or burkinabé) may refer to:

- Something of, from, or related to Burkina Faso, a nation in West Africa
- A person from Burkina Faso, or of Burkinabe descent. For information about the Burkinabe people, see:
  - Demographics of Burkina Faso
  - Culture of Burkina Faso
  - List of Burkinabes
- Burkinabe cuisine
- Alphabet national burkinabè
