= Telephone numbers in Burkina Faso =

Country Code: +226
International Call Prefix: 00
Trunk Prefix:

== Calling formats ==
- AB PQ MC DU - Calls within Burkina Faso
- +226 AB PQ MC DU - Calls from outside Burkina Faso

The NSN length is eight digits.

== Changes since 2004 ==
LIST OF MOBILE ALLOCATION CHANGES SINCE 2004
Operator	New Numbers AB PQ MC DU
ONATEL SA	60 00 XXXX - 60 99 XXXX
ONATEL SA	61 20 XXXX - 61 39 XXXX
ONATEL SA	61 60 XXXX - 61 79 XXXX
ONATEL SA	61 80 XXXX - 61 99 XXXX
Telecel FASO SA	6830 XXXX - 6839 XXXX
AIRTEL BURKINA FASO S.A.	65 00 XXXX – 65 09 XXXX
AIRTEL BURKINA FASO S.A.	66 80 XXXX – 66 99 XXXX
AIRTEL BURKINA FASO S.A.	77 40 XXXX - 77 69 XXXX
AIRTEL BURKINA FASO S.A.	77 90 XXXX - 77 99 XXXX
TELECEL FASO S.A.	68 00 XXXX - 68 29 XXXX
TELECEL FASO S.A.	79 84 XXXX - 79 99 XXXX

== Changes in 2004 ==
LIST OF MOBILE ALLOCATIONS IN 2004
Operator	New numbers AB PQ MC DU
TELMOB SA	70 00 XXXX – 70 05 XXXX
TELMOB SA	70 10 XXXX – 70 45 XXXX
TELMOB SA	70 50 XXXX – 70 55 XXXX
TELMOB SA	70 60 XXXX – 70 99 XXXX
TELMOB SA	71 00 XXXX – 71 40 XXXX
TELMOB SA	71 81 XXXX – 71 99 XXXX
TELMOB SA	72 00 XXXX – 72 19 XXXX
TELMOB SA	72 20 XXXX – 72 99 XXXX
TELMOB SA	73 00 XXXX – 73 19 XXXX
TELMOB SA	73 22 XXXX – 73 41 XXXX
TELMOB SA	73.52 XXXX – 73.91 XXXX
CELTEL BURKINA FASO S.A	74 00 XXXX – 74 99 XXXX
CELTEL BURKINA FASO S.A	75 00 XXXX – 75 19 XXXX
CELTEL BURKINA FASO S.A	75 30 XXXX – 75 49 XXXX
CELTEL BURKINA FASO S.A	75 60 XXXX – 75 99 XXXX
CELTEL BURKINA FASO S.A	76 00 XXXX – 76 28 XXXX
CELTEL BURKINA FASO S.A	76 31 XXXX – 76 99 XXXX
CELTEL BURKINA FASO S.A	77 20 XXXX – 77 29 XXXX
AIRTEL BURKINA FASO S.A.	77 00 XXXX – 77 19 XXXX
AIRTEL BURKINA FASO S.A.	77 30 XXXX – 77 39 XXXX
TELECEL FASO S.A.	78 00 XXXX – 78 13 XXXX
TELECEL FASO S.A.	78 37 XXXX – 78 61 XXXX
TELECEL FASO S.A.	78 72.XXXX – 78 79 XXXX
TELECEL FASO S.A.	78 80 XXXX – 78 87 XXXX
TELECEL FASO S.A.	78 90 XXXX – 78 99 XXXX
TELECEL FASO S.A.	79 00 XXXX – 79 09 XXXX
TELECEL FASO S.A.	79 13 XXXX
TELECEL FASO S.A.	79 24 XXXX – 79 68 XXXX

There is no record of what the old mobile number allocations were, or how these map to the new number ranges.

LIST OF FIXED LINE CHANGES IN 2004
Area	Former numbers PQ MC DU	New numbers AB PQ MC DU
1	-	20 49 XXXX
1	52 XX XX	20 52 XX XX
1	53 XX XX	20 53 XX XX
1	90 XX XX	20 90 XX XX
1	91 XX XX	20 91 XX XX
1	-	20 96 XXXX
1	97 XX XX	20 97 XX XX
1	98 XX XX	20 98 XX XX
1	99 XX XX	20 99 XX XX
2	30 XX XX	50 30 XX XX
2	31 XX XX	50 31 XX XX
2	32 XX XX	50 32 XX XX
2	33 XX XX	50 33 XX XX
2	34 XX XX	50 34 XX XX
2	35 XX XX	50 35 XX XX
2	36 XX XX	50 36 XX XX
2	37 XX XX	50 37 XX XX
2	38 XX XX	50 38 XX XX
2	39 XX XX	50 39 XX XX
2	40 XX XX	50 40 XX XX
2	41 XX XX	50 41 XX XX
2	42 XX XX	50 42 XX XX
2	43 XX XX	50 43 XX XX
2	44 XX XX	50 44 XX XX
2	-	50 45 XX XX
2	-	50 46 XX XX
2	-	50 47 XX XX
3	45 XX XX	40 45 XX XX
3	46 XX XX	40 46 XX XX
3	-	40 49 XX XX
3	55 XX XX	40 55 XX XX
3	70 XX XX	40 70 XX XX
3	71 XX XX	40 71 XX XX
3	77 XX XX	40 77 XX XX
3	79 XX XX	40 79 XX XX

== List of area codes in Burkina Faso ==
LIST OF AREA CODES
Area/City	Area Code
Banfora	xx88
Dédougou	xx52
Diébougou	xx86
Dori	xx66
Fada	4077
Gaoua	xx87
Kantchari	4079
Kaya	4045 or 2049
Koudougou	5044
Koupéla	4070
Orodara	2096
Ouagadougou	5030 – 5038
Ouahigouya	4055 or xx56
Tenkodogo	4071
Tougan	2053 or xx54
	2052
	2090
	2091
	2097
	2098
	2099
	5039
	5040
	5041
	5042
	5043
	5046
	5047
	4046
