= Symposium de sculpture sur granit de Laongo =

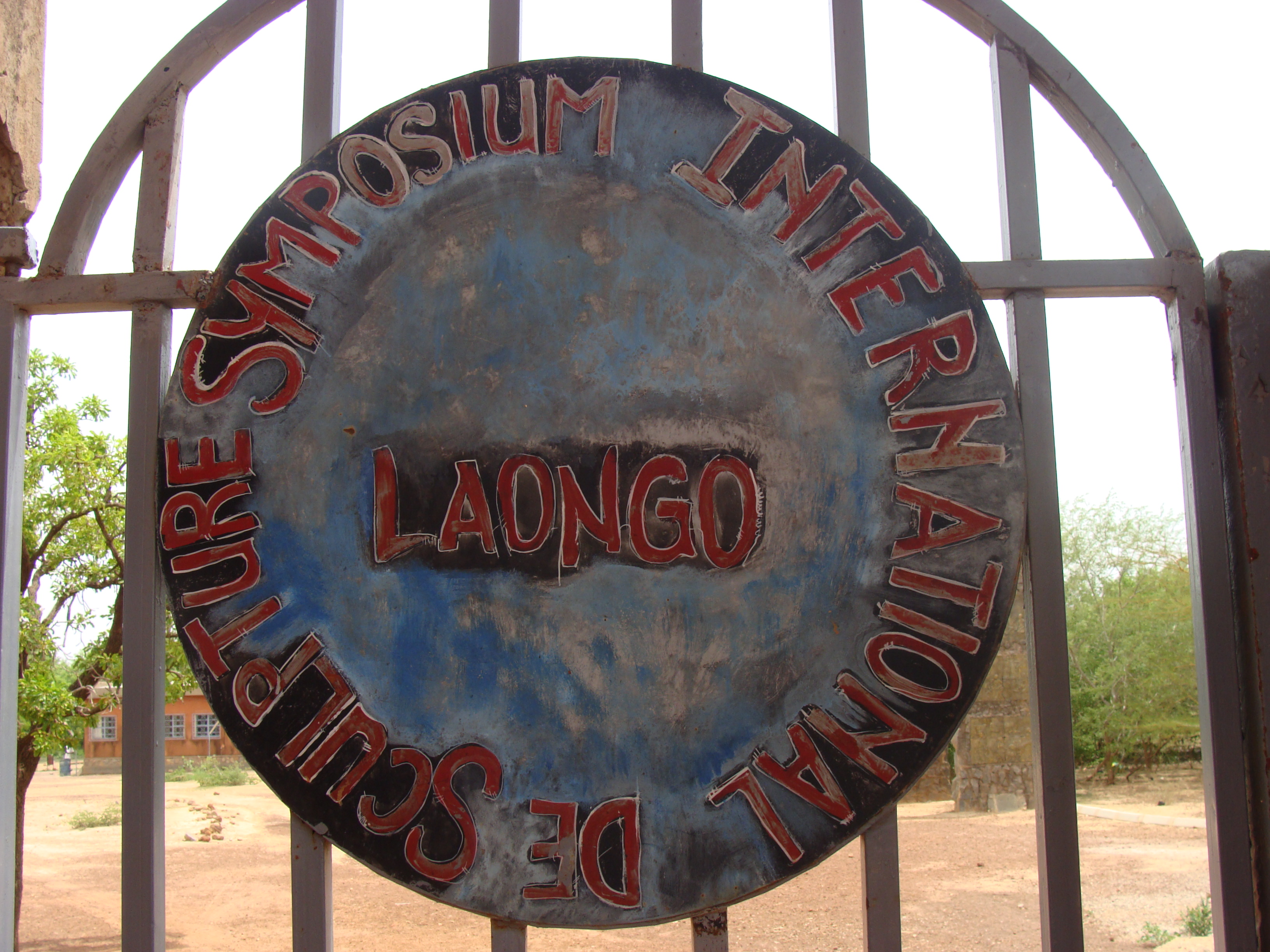
- Symbol on gates
- Established: January 13, 1989
- Coordinates: 12.535875°N 1.284473°W
- Collections: Granite sculpture
- Founder: Siriki Ky
- Public transit access: no
- Website: none

Founded in 1989, by Burkinabe sculptor Siriky Ky, the symposium takes place on a site located about 35 km from Ouagadougou, in the province of Oubritenga. Invited sculptors create their works in-situ using granite from the site. Some works combine local granite and other materials such as metal.

The first iteration of the biennial symposium opened January 13, 1989, gathering 18 sculptors from 13 countries.

The tenth edition took place over twenty days in May 2012.

As of 2010, the legal status of the site was unclear, with overlaps and gaps in jurisdictions.
