= Muzzle clamp =

The muzzle clamp is a method of killing used by big predators, usually cats such as Panthera leo, the lion, Panthera pardus, the leopard, and Panthera uncia, the snow leopard. It requires the subduing of prey, usually completely on the ground and pinned by the predator, and the engulfing of the muzzle of the prey entirely in the mouth of the predator, blocking respiration through either the mouth or nose.

== Usage ==
It is generally easier for large, social carnivores to use this method with large prey when there are multiple individuals holding the prey still while it suffocates, in the case of the lion, or for solitary carnivores killing weak or small animals. It is not as common as the throat clamp with cats. It is also a calculated measure not seen often because most predators are known, especially canids and hyaenids, for eating the prey while it's still alive and letting it die of loss of blood and/or shock, not bothering with killing it first. This method also silences the prey for the most part and can be used by solitary animals to keep the noise down as not to attract other predators with the commotion.

== Anatomy ==
Canines that are strong and not too long are generally essential for this method because any rapid movement of the head of the prey can break long or fragile canines and canines that are too short won't penetrate into the muscle and skin of the muzzle far enough and the prey can pull free. The predator cannot breathe through its mouth when applying a muzzle clamp and must resort to breathing through the nose, which causes the issue of not enough oxygen if the predator is exhausted since panting through the mouth is much more efficient than breathing through the nose for most predators. If the predator is too tired, it may resort to another method of killing or withhold from finishing the prey off until it catches its breath.
