= Throat clamp =

Predation method

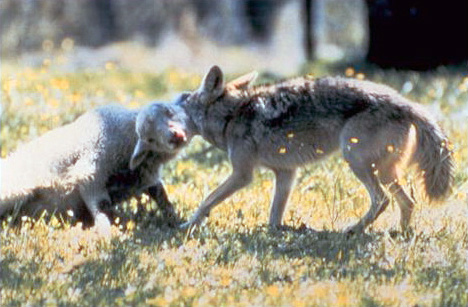
Coyote with a typical throat hold on domestic sheep

Throat clamp is a method of subduing that involves the predator using its jaw to grasp the throat of the prey and clamp tight so that the prey's windpipe is either crushed or blocked, causing asphyxiation. It is often seen in predatory felids and occasionally canids and hyaenids, and it has been recently observed in small didelphids.

Cats use this technique to kill prey while dogs and hyenas use this to weaken the prey before eating it, generally alive. It's more often used than the muzzle clamp and is generally safer, though slower. It is usually most effective when positioned as near to the mandible as the carnivore can get. Between the larynx and the jaw, the windpipe is surrounded with less cartilage and is more malleable, while lower down, near the chest, the passageway would be increasingly harder to collapse, so the throat clamp is usually positioned high up on the animal's neck.

== Usage ==
If the prey is on the ground and pinned, most predators position themselves behind the animal to use their body's weight to help control the movements of the prey and reach around to grab the throat, usually twisting the head around, aiding in both their grasp and the blocking of the windpipe.

If the prey is standing, a solitary predator can use a throat clamp usually only if the prey is small or in shock. A strong, large animal can easily kick and injure the predator from this angle. A social predator can use the standing throat clamp much more easily because there can be other individuals on the back of the prey, stopping it from kicking, which could lead to collapse, or using a throat clamp periodically to tire the animal out. This latter method usually involves large, patient carnivores such as the gray wolf (Canis lupus) and African wild dog (Lycaon pictus). They surround the prey in relatively large numbers, individuals taking turns to jump in and grab the prey by the flanks to try and pull it down, while the prey forcing them off grows exhausted, and in the meantime, more experienced individuals secure a throat clamp on the distracted animal and hold on as long as possible to the struggling prey. The temporary throat clamp can make the prey dizzy and uncoordinated and even force it to go into shock if the chase and attack wasn't enough, aiding in the predator's attempts to pull it to the ground. Agile predators such as lions have been observed to perch on the upper back and neck of large cape buffalo and wrap around to secure a partial throat clamp.

== Anatomy ==
Strong canine teeth are generally required for this move: canines that are too short won't penetrate deeply enough and struggling prey can tear free, while canines that are too long or weak can be broken in the struggle with large prey. This fact created a controversy that is still generally unresolved as to the killing tactics of the extinct carnivores machairodonts, or sabre-toothed cats. Strong jaws are often needed to compress the windpipe far enough.

Most often, the canines pierce the prey behind the windpipe so that it is not torn, but compressed between premolars of upper and lower jaws. It can be compared to the bit of a horse's bridle in placement. With the mouth completely enclosing the windpipe, it is very difficult to break free from if the predator does not relax its grip.

== Alternative forms ==
Occasionally, and as suggested for the killing method of machairodonts, the canines actually pierce the windpipe and the surrounding blood vessels so that the tear in arteries and adjacent windpipe lead to a flow of blood into the windpipe and down into the lungs where the animal essentially drowns in its own blood. This method has not been used regularly by any modern carnivores and is, due to the bloody nature, not suitable for an area with high competition due to the smell attracting other predators. It can be argued that this is not a true throat clamp, but another specialized type of killing.
