= Joachim Hermenegilde Ouédraogo =

Burkinabe Catholic prelate (born 1962)

The Most Reverend Joachim Hermenegilde Ouédraogo
- Bishop of Koudougou, Burkina Faso
- Church: Catholic Church
- Archdiocese: Roman Catholic Archdiocese of Ouagadougou
- See: Diocese of Koudougou
- Appointed: 4 November 2011
- Installed: 17 December 2011
- Predecessor: Basile Tapsoba
- Successor: Incumbent
- Other post: Bishop of the Roman Catholic Diocese of Dori (20 November 2004 - 4 November 2011)

Orders
- Ordination: 6 July 1991
- Consecration: 19 March 2005 by Philippe Nakellentuba Ouédraogo
- Rank: Bishop

Personal details
- Born: Joachim Hermenegilde Ouédraogo; 18 March 1962 (age 64) Roukou, Centre-Ouest Region, Diocese of Ouahigouya, Burkina Faso
- Motto: "TOTUS OMNIBUS UT TE COGNOSCANT" (Let everyone know you)

Styles of Joachim Hermenegilde Ouédraogo
- Reference style: Your Lordship; The Most Reverend
- Spoken style: His Lordship
- Religious style: Bishop

Joachim Hermenegilde Ouédraogo (born 18 March 1962) is a Burkinabe Catholic prelate who serves as Bishop of the Roman Catholic Diocese of Koudougou, Burkina Faso, since 4 November 2011. Before that, from 20 November 2004 until 4 November 2011, he was the Bishop of the Roman Catholic Diocese of Dori, Burkina Faso. He was appointed bishop of Dori on 20 November 2004 by Pope John Paul II. He was consecrated and installed at Dori, in March 2005 by Bbishop Philippe Nakellentuba Ouédraogo, Bishop of Ouahigouya. On 4 November 2011, Pope Francis transferred him to the Diocese of Koudougou, Burkina Faso and appointed him the local ordinary there. He was installed at Koudougou on 17 December 2011.

== Background and education ==
He was born on 18 March 1962, at Rouko, in the Diocese of Ouahigouya, Burkina Faso. He attended minor seminary in Burhina Faso. He studied at the Saint Jean Baptiste Seminary in Ouagadougou, where he studied philosophy. He then transferred to the Koumi Major Seminary in Bobo-Dioulasso, where he studied Theology. He holds a Licentiate in spiritual theology awarded by the Teresianum in Rome, Italy.

== Priesthood ==
On 6 July 1991, he was ordained a priest and incardinated in the diocese of Ouahigouya. He served in that capacity until 20 November 2004. While a priest, he served in various roles including as:

- Parochial vicar in the parish of Kongoussi from 1991 until 1994.
- Priest in charge of vocations in the diocese from 1991 until 1994.
- Professor at the Notre Dame d'Afrique Minor Seminary in Koudougou from 1994 until 1995.
- Secretary to the Bishopric of Ouahigouya from 1995 until 1998.
- Studies at the Teresianum in Rome, leading to the award of a Licentiate in Spiritual Theology, from 1998 until 2000.
- Parish priest of Gourcy Parish from 2000 until 2001.
- President of the Diocesan Council of Catholic Education from 2000 until 2001.
- Rector of the Minor Seminary of Notre Dame de Nazareth in Ouahigouya from 2001 until 2004.
- Vicar General of the Diocese of Ouahigouya from 2001 until 2004.

== As bishop ==
On 20 November 2004, Pope John Paul II created the Roman Catholic Diocese of Dori by taking territory from the Diocese of Fada N'Gourma and the Diocese of Ouahigouya. The new diocese was a made a suffragan of the Ecclesiastical Metropolitan Province of Koupéla. The Holy Father appointed Father Joachim Hermenegilde Ouédraogo, previously the icar General of Ouahigouya Diocese as the first bishop at Dori.

He was consecrated and installed at Dori, Burkina Faso on 19 March 2005 by the hands of Bishop Philippe Nakellentuba Ouédraogo, Bishop of Ouahigouya assisted by Bishop Paul Yemboaro Ouédraogo, Bishop of Fada N'Gourma and Séraphin François Rouamba, Archbishop of Koupéla.

On 4 November 2011, Pope Francis appointed him bishop of the Roman Catholic Diocese of Koudougou, Burkina Faso. He succeeded Bishop Basile Tapsoba, whose health-related retirement was accepted by The Holy Father that May. Bishop Joachim Hermenegilde Ouédraogo served as Apostolic Administrator of the Diocese of Koudougou from May 2011 until November 2011. He was installed at Koudougou, on 17 December 2011.

== Controversy ==
According to ACI Africa Bishop Joachim Hermenegilde Ouédraogo was introduced to one Jonace Kiswendsida Yaméogo, the CEO of Group Champy International, in 2018. Over time, "Yaméogo becoming a benefactor to the Diocese, offering financial and material support such as motorbikes, IT equipment, and building projects",... The bishop reportedly partnered with his acquaintance to secure a loan of US$3.5 million, from a local financial institution, using Diocesan real estate as collateral. Bishop Joachim Hermenegilde Ouédraogo "has been prosecuted for organized fraud and money laundering".

In June 2025, Bishop Joachim Ouédraogo took an indefinite leave of absence from the pastoral care of Koudougou Diocese. The Holy Father appointed Bishop Alexandre Yikyi Bazié, the Auxiliary Bishop of the same Catholic diocese, as Apostolic Administrator until further notice.

== See also ==
- Catholic Church in Burkina Faso

== Succession table ==
Catholic Church titles
Preceded by None (Diocese created)	Bishop of Dori (20 November 2004 - 4 November 2011)	Succeeded by Laurent Birfuoré Dabiré (31 January 2013 - 18 December 2024)
Preceded by Basile Tapsoba (2 July 1984 - 21 May 2011)	Bishop of Koudougou (since 4 November 2011)	Succeeded by Incumbent
