= Justin Kientega =

Burkinabe Catholic prelate (born 1959)

The Most Reverend Justin Kientega
- Bishop of Ouahigouya, Burkina Faso
- Church: Catholic Church
- Archdiocese: Roman Catholic Archdiocese of Ouagadougou
- See: Roman Catholic Diocese of Ouahigouya
- Appointed: 2 February 2010
- Installed: 29 May 2010
- Predecessor: Philippe Nakellentuba Ouédraogo
- Successor: Incumbent

Orders
- Ordination: 25 July 1987
- Consecration: 29 May 2010 by Philippe Nakellentuba Ouédraogo
- Rank: Bishop

Personal details
- Born: 7 July 1959 (age 67) Temnaore, Centre-Nord Region, Burkina Faso

Styles of Justin Kientega
- Reference style: Your Lordship; The Most Reverend
- Spoken style: His Lordship
- Religious style: Bishop

Justin Kientega (born 7 July 1959) is a Burkinabe Catholic prelate who is the bishop of the Roman Catholic Diocese of Ouahigouya, Burkina Faso since 2 February 2010. Before that, from 25 July 1987 until 2 February 2010, he was a priest of the Catholic Diocese of Koudougou. He was consecrated and installed at Ouahigouya on 29 May 2010 by Archbishop Philippe Nakellentuba Ouédraogo, Archbishop of Ouagadougou.

== Background and education ==
He was born on 7 July 1959 in Temnaoré, Centre-Nord Region, Burkina Faso. He studied philosophy at the Saint Jean-Baptiste Major Seminary in Ouagadougou, from 1980 until 1982. He then studied theology at the Saint Pierre Claver de Koumi Major Seminary in Bobo Dioulasso, from 1982 until 1987. He studied at the Camillianum Institute of the Theology of Pastoral Care in Sick, in Rome, Italy from 2002 until 2007, graduating with a Doctorate in Pastoral Theology of Health.

== Priesthood ==
On 25 July 1987, he was ordained a priest of the Diocese of Koudougou, Burkina Faso. He was a priest until 2 Feb 2010.

He served in many roles during his priesthood including:

- Vicar of "St Alphonse" in Réo, Burkina Faso, from 1987 until 1992.
- Diocesan chaplain of the "Missionary Child" from 1988 until 1992.
- Parish priest of the Cathedral Parish of Koudougou from 1992 until 2001.
- Parish Vicar of "Our Lady of Reconciliation of Burkina" in Koudougou from 2007 until 2008.
- General Bursar of the Diocese of Koudougou from 2008 until 2010.
- Chaplain of the Koudougou Regional Hospital Center from 2008 until 2010.

== As bishop ==
Pope Benedict XVI appointed him as bishop of the Roman Catholic Diocese of Ouahigouya, on 2 February 2010. He was consecrated and installed at Ouahigouya on 29 May 2010 by the hands of Archbishop Philippe Nakellentuba Ouédraogo, Archbishop of Ouagadougou assisted by Archbishop Séraphin François Rouamba, Archbishop of Koupéla and Bishop Bishop Basile Tapsoba, Bishop of Koudougou.

== See also ==
- Catholic Church in Burkina Faso

== Succession table ==
Catholic Church titles
Preceded by Philippe Nakellentuba Ouédraogo (5 July 1996 - 13 May 2009)	Bishop of Ouahigouya (since 2 February 2010)	Succeeded by Incumbent
