= List of cathedrals in Burkina Faso =

This is the list of cathedrals in Burkina Faso.

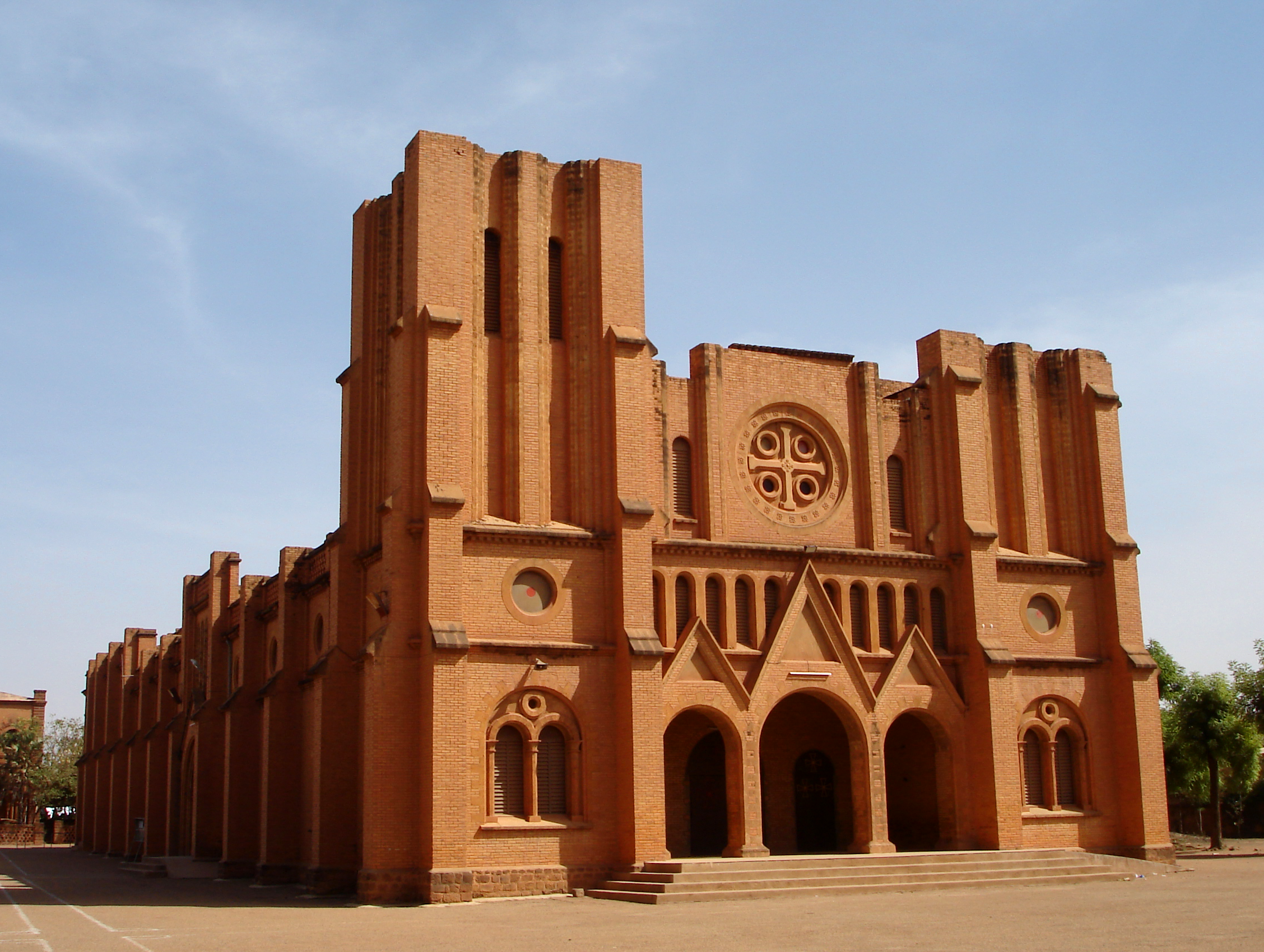
Cathedral of the Immaculate Conception in Ouagadougou

== Catholic ==
Cathedrals of the Catholic Church in Burkina Faso:

- Cathedral of St. Peter in Banfora
- Cathedral of Our Lady of Lourdes in Bobo-Dioulasso
- Cathedral of St. Ann in Dédougou
- Cathedral of Sts. Peter and Paul in Diébougou
- Cathedral of St. Ann in Dori
- Cathedral of St. Joseph in Fada N’Gourma
- Cathedral of the Sacred Heart in Gaoua
- Cathedral of Our Lady of Kaya in Kaya
- Cathedral of St. Augustine in Koudougou
- Cathedral of Our Lady of Graces in Koupéla
- Cathedral of Our Lady of the Assumption in Manga
- Cathedral of Our Lady of Perpetual Help in Nouna
- Cathedral of the Immaculate Conception in Ouagadougou
- Cathédrale Notre Dame de la Délivrance in Ouahigouya
- Cathedral of Maria Regina in Tenkodogo

== See also ==
- List of cathedrals
