= Alexandre Yikyi Bazié =

Burkinabe Catholic prelate (born 1960)

The Most Reverend Alexandre Yikyi Bazié
- Auxiliary Bishop of Koudougou, Burkina Faso
- Church: Catholic Church
- Archdiocese: Roman Catholic Archdiocese of Ouagadougou
- See: Roman Catholic Diocese of Koudougou
- Appointed: 25 March 2019
- Installed: 29 June 2019
- Other posts: Titular Bishop of Gummi in Byzacena (since 25 March 2019); Apostolic Administrator of Koudougou (since 23 June 2025)

Orders
- Ordination: 19 July 1987
- Consecration: 29 June 2019 by Joachim Hermenegilde Ouédraogo
- Rank: Bishop

Personal details
- Born: Alexandre Yikyi Bazié; 17 August 1960 (age 66) Ténado, Diocese of Koudougou, Centre-Ouest Region, Burkina Faso

Styles of Alexandre Yikyi Bazié
- Reference style: Your Eminence; The Most Reverend
- Spoken style: His Eminence
- Religious style: Bishop

Alexandre Yikyi Bazié (born 17 August 1960) is a Burkinabe Catholic prelate who is the Auxiliary Bishop of the Roman Catholic Diocese of Koudougou, in Burkina Faso since 25 March 2019. He was concurrently assigned Titular Bishop of Gummi in Byzacena. Before that, from 19 July 1987 until he was appointed bishop, he was a priest of the same Catholic diocese. He was appointed bishop by Pope Francis. He was consecrated bishop at Koudougou on 29 June 2019. On 23 June 2025, Pope Leo XIV appointed him Apostolic Administrator of the Diocese of Koudougou.

== Background and education ==
He was born on 17 August 1960 in Ténado, Diocese of Koudougou, Centre-Ouest Region, Burkina Faso. He studied at the Notre Dame d’Afrique Minor Seminary in Koudougou. He studied philosophy at the inter-diocesan Saint Jean-Baptiste Major Seminary in Ouagadougou. He then transferred to the Saint Pierre Claver Major Seminary of Koumi, in Bobo-Dioulasso, where he studied Theology. He holds a Doctorate in Dogmatic Theology awarded by the Pontifical Urban University in Rome, Italy, where he graduated in 1997.

== Priest ==
On 19 July 1987, he was ordained a priest of the Diocese of Koudougou, Burkina Faso. He served a priest until 25 March 2019. He served in various roles and locations, while a priest, including:

- Parochial Vicar in Réo, Burkina Faso from 1987 until 1988.
- Parochial Vicar in Didyr, Burkina Faso from 1988 until 1992.
- National chaplain of the scouts in Burkina Faso in 1992.
- Studies at the Pontifical Urban University in Rome, Italy leading to the award of a doctorate in dogmatic theology from 1992 until 1997.
- Professor of Systematic Theology at the Interdiocesan Saint Pierre Claver Major Seminary of Koumi, in Bobo-Dioulasso from 1997 until 2005.
- Rector of the Interdiocesan Saint Pierre Claver Major Seminary of Koumi, in Bobo-Dioulasso from 1998 until 2005.
- Sabbatical year from 2005 until 2006.
- Professor at the Catholic University of West Africa in Abidjan, Ivory Coast from 2006 until 2009.
- In the Diocese available to the Bishop from 2009 until 2010.
- Parish administrator of Notro Dame de Tourlande in the Diocese of Saint-Flour in France from 2010 until 2011.
- Parochial Vicar of Saint Géraud d'Aurillac, in the Diocese of Saint-Flour, in France from 2011 until 2016.
- Diocesan responsible for Youth Ministry in the Diocese of Saint-Flour, France from 2011 until 2016.
- Parish priest of Saint Alphonse in Réo, Diocese of Koudougou from 2016 until 2018.
- Vicar General of Koudougou Catholic Diocese from 2018 until 2019.

== Bishop ==
On 25 March 2019, Pope Francis appointed Reverend Father Alexandre Yikyi Bazié, previously a member of the clergy of Koudougou and the Vicar General of the same See, as Auxiliary Bishop of the Diocese of Koudougou, Burkina Faso. The new bishop was assigned Titular Bishop of Gummi in Byzacena.

He was consecrated auxiliary bishop of Koudougou and Titular Bishop of Gummi in Byzacena, at Saint Augustin Cathedral, in Koudougou, on 29 June 2019. The Principal Consecrator was Joachim Hermenegilde Ouédraogo, Bishop of Koudou gou assisted by Justin Kientega, Bishop of Ouahigouya and Paul Yemboaro Ouédraogo, Archbishop of Bobo-Dioulasso. On 23 June 2025, following the indefinite leave taken by Bishop Joachim Hermenegilde Ouédraogo, The Holy Father, Pope Leo XIV appointed Bishop Alexandre Yikyi Bazié Apostolic Administrator of the Diocese of Koudougou until further notice.

== See also ==
- Catholic Church in Burkina Faso

== Succession table ==
Catholic Church titles
Preceded by	Auxiliary Bishop of Koudougou (since 25 March 2019)	Succeeded by Incumbent
Preceded by	Apostolic Administrator of Koudougou (since 23 June 2025)	Succeeded by Incumbent
