= Basile Tapsoba =

Burkinabe Catholic prelate (born 1942)

The Most Reverend Basile Tapsoba
- Bishop Emeritus of Koudougou, Burkina Faso
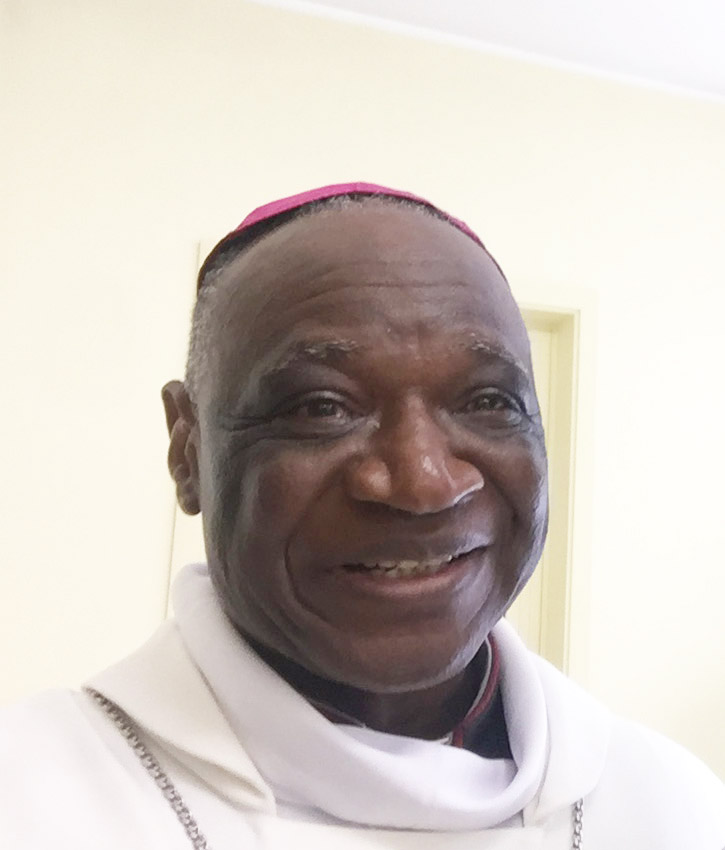
- Bishop Basile Tapsoba on 23 April 2017
- Church: Catholic Church
- Archdiocese: Roman Catholic Archdiocese of Ouagadougou
- See: Roman Catholic Diocese of Koudougou
- Appointed: 2 July 1984
- Installed: 2 July 1084
- Predecessor: Anthyme Bayala
- Successor: Joachim Hermenegilde Ouédraogo
- Other post: Auxiliary Bishop of the Diocese of Koudougou (19 December 1981 - 2 July 1984)

Orders
- Ordination: 4 July 1971
- Consecration: 21 March 1982 by Paul Zoungrana
- Rank: Bishop

Personal details
- Born: Basile Tapsoba; 9 December 1942 (age 83) Koudougou, Centre-Ouest Region, Burkina Faso

Styles of Basile Tapsoba
- Reference style: Your Lordship; The Most Reverend
- Spoken style: His Lordship
- Religious style: Bishop

Basile Tapsoba (born 9 December 1942) is a Burkinabe Catholic prelate who is the Bishop Emeritus of the Roman Catholic Diocese of Koudougou in Burkina Faso, since 21 May 2011. He served as Bishop of that Catholic See from 2 July 1984, until his resignation on 21 May 2011. Before that, he was Auxiliary Bishop of the same diocese, from 19 December 1981 until 2 July 1984. He concurrently served as Titular Bishop of Mesarfelta, while auxiliary bishop. He was appointed bishop on 19 December 1981 by Pope John Paul II. His episcopal consecration took place on 21 March 1982 at Koudougou by the hands of Cardinal Paul Zoungrana, Archbishop of Ouagadougou. Pope Benedict XVI accepted his resignation request on 21 May 2011.

== Background and education ==
He was born on 9 December 1942 in Koudougou, Diocese of Koudougou, Centre-Ouest Region, in Burkina Faso. He studied philosophy and theology at seminary. He was ordained a priest for the Diocese of Koudougou on 4 July 1971.

== Priest ==
On 4 July 1971, he was ordained a priest for the Diocese of Koudougou. He served as a priest until 19 December 1981.

== Bishop ==
On 19 December 1981, Pope John Paul II appointed Reverend Father Basile Tapsoba of the clergy of Koudougou as Auxiliary Bishop of the Diocese of Koudougou. The Holy Father assigned him the title of Titular Bishop of Mesarfelta. He was consecrated at Koudougou, on 21 March 1982 by the hands of Cardinal Paul Zoungrana, Archbishop of Ouagadougou assisted by Justo Mullor García, Titular Archbishop of Emerita Augusta and Dieudonné Yougbaré, Bishop of Koupéla.

On 3 April 1984, Bishop Anthyme Bayala, the local ordinary of the Diocese of Koudougou died in office. Bishop Basile Tapsoba, previously the auxiliary bishop of the same Catholic See was appointed to succeed at Koudougou on 2 July 1984. He served in that capacity until 21 May 2011. On that date, Pope Benedict XVI accepted his early-resignation request. The holy Father appointed Bishop Joachim Hermenegilde Ouédraogo to succeed him on 4 November 2011.

== See also ==
- Catholic Church in Burkina Faso

== Succession table ==
Catholic Church titles
| Preceded by Anthyme Bayala (15 November 1966 - 3 April 1984) | Bishop of Koudougou (2 July 1984 - 21 May 2011) | Succeeded by Joachim Hermenegilde Ouédraogo (since 4 November 2011) |
| Preceded by | Auxiliary Bishop of Koudougou (19 Dec 1981 - 2 July 1984) | Succeeded by |
