= David Koudougou =

Burkinabe Roman Catholic prelate (born 1972)

The Most Reverend David Koudougou
- Bishop-Elect of Tenkodogo, Burkina Faso
- Church: Catholic Church
- Archdiocese: Roman Catholic Archdiocese of Koupéla
- See: Roman Catholic Diocese of Tenkodogo
- Appointed: 6 February 2025
- Installed: 24 May 2025
- Predecessor: Prosper Kontiebo
- Successor: Bishop-Elect
- Other post: Apostolic Administrator of Tenkodogo Diocese (November 2023 - February 2025)

Orders
- Ordination: 14 July 2001
- Consecration: 24 May 2025 by Philippe Ouédraogo (cardinal)
- Rank: Bishop

Personal details
- Born: David Koudougou; 1 August 1972 (age 54) Tenkodogo, Boulgou Province, Centre-Est Region, Burkina Faso

Styles of David Koudougou
- Reference style: Your Lordship; The Most Reverend
- Spoken style: His Lordship
- Religious style: Bishop

David Koudougou (born 1 August 1972) is a Burkinabe Catholic prelate who was appointed bishop of the Roman Catholic Diocese of Tenkodogo, Burkina Faso on 6 February 2025. Before that, from 14 July 2001 until 6 February 2025, he was a priest of the Catholic Diocese of Tenkodogo. He served as Apostolic Administrator of Tenkodogo Diocese from November 2025 until his appointment as bishop there in February 2025. His consecration and installation a Tenkodogo is scheduled to take place on 24 May 2025.

== Background and education ==
He was born on 1 August 1972 in Tenkodogo, Boulgou Province, Centre-Est Region, Burkina Faso. At that time this location was in the Roman Catholic Diocese of Fada N'Gourma.

He attended primary school in his home area from 1979 until 1985. From 1986 until 199, he studied at Rialé High School in Tenkodogo. He studied at the Saint Jean-Baptiste de Wayalgê Major Seminary at Ouagadougou from 1994 until 2001. As part of his studies at seminary, he took off one year to perform a pastoral internship at the Cathedral of Our Lady of Graces in Koupéla, Burkina Faso from 1998 until 1999.

From 2006 until 2009 he studied at the Pontifical Gregorian University in Rome, Italy, graduating with a Licentiate in Canon Law. Between 2013 and 2016, he undertook further studies at the same university graduating with a Doctorate in Canon Law.

== Priesthood ==
On 14 July 2001 he was ordained a priest of the Diocese of Fada N'Gourma, in the Metropolitan Province of Koupéla, Burkina Faso. When the diocese of Tenkodogo was created on 11 February 2012, Father David Koudougou was incardinated as a priest of the new diocese. He served in that capacity until 6 February 2025.

He served in many roles during his priesthood as detailed in this reference. From late 2023 until February 2025, he was Apostolic Administrator of Tenkodogo Diocese.

== As bishop ==
Pope Francis appointed him as Bishop of the Roman Catholic Diocese of Tenkodogo, on 6 February 2025. He took over a position that was left vacant on 16 October 2023 when Bishop Prosper Kontiébo was appointed Archbishop of Ouagadougou. His consecration and installation are scheduled on 24 May 2025 at Tenkodogo.

== See also ==
- Catholic Church in Burkina Faso

== Succession table ==
Catholic Church titles
Preceded by Prosper Kontiebo (11 February 2012 - 16 October 2023)	Bishop of Tenkodogo (since 6 February 2025)	Succeeded by Bishop-Elect
