= Laurent Birfuoré Dabiré =

Burkinabe Catholic prelate (born 1965)

The Most Reverend Laurent Birfuoré Dabiré
- Archbishop of Bobo-Dioulasso, Burkina Faso
- Church: Catholic Church
- Archdiocese: Roman Catholic Archdiocese of Bobo-Dioulasso
- See: Bobo-Dioulasso
- Appointed: 18 December 2024
- Installed: 18 December 2024
- Predecessor: Paul Yemboaro Ouédraogo
- Successor: Incumbent
- Other post: Bishop of the Roman Catholic Diocese of Dori (31 January 2013 - 18 December 2024)

Orders
- Ordination: 29 December 1995
- Consecration: 4 May 2013 by Séraphin François Rouamba
- Rank: Archbishop

Personal details
- Born: Laurent Birfuoré Dabiré; 17 September 1965 (age 61) Dissin, Diocese of Diébougou, Hauts-Bassins Region, Burkina Faso
- Motto: "His will be done"

Styles of Laurent Birfuoré Dabiré
- Reference style: Your Lordship; The Most Reverend
- Spoken style: His Lordship
- Religious style: Bishop

Laurent Birfuoré Dabiré (born 17 September 1965) is a Burkinabe Catholic prelate who serves as Archbishop of the Roman Catholic Archdiocese of Bobo-Dioulasso, since 18 December 2024. Before that, from 31 January 2013 until 18 December 2024, he was the Bishop of the Roman Catholic Diocese of Dori, Burkina Faso. He was appointed bishop of Dori on 31 January 2013 by Pope Benedict XVI. He was consecrated and installed at Dori, on 4 May 2013 by Séraphin François Rouamba, Archbishop of Koupéla. On 18 December 2024, Pope Francis appointed him archbishop of the Metropolitan Province of Bobo-Dioulasso. He was installed there on 2 February 2025.

== Background and education ==
He was born on 17 September 1965, at Dissin, near Diébougou, in the archdiocese of Bobo-Dioulasso, Burkina Faso. After attending studies in philosophy and Theology, in Burkina Faso, he was ordained a priest of the Roman Catholic Diocese of Diébougou on 29 December 1995.

== Priesthood ==
On 29 December 1995, he was ordained a priest. He served in that capacity until 31 January 2013. As a priest, he served in various roles including as professor at the minor seminary of Saint-Tarcisius in Diébougou from 1996 until 1998.

== As bishop ==
On 31 January 2013, Pope Benedict XVI appointed him as bishop of the Roman Catholic Diocese of Dori. He was consecrated and installed at Dori, Burkina Faso on 4 May 2013 by the hands of Archbishop Séraphin François Rouamba, Archbishop of Koupéla assisted by Bishop Der Raphaël Dabiré Kusiélé, Bishop of Diébougou and Bishop Joachim Hermenegilde Ouédraogo, Bishop of Koudougou.

On 18 December 2024, Pope Francis appointed him Archbishop of the Roman Catholic Archdiocese of Bobo-Dioulasso. He succeeded Bishop Paul Yemboaro Ouédraogo, whose age-related resignation was accepted by The Holy Father that same day. He was installed there as archbishop on 2 February 2025, in a ceremony presided over by Cardinal Philippe Nakellentuba Ouédraogo, Archbishop Emeritus of Ouagadougou.

== See also ==
- Catholic Church in Burkina Faso

== Succession table ==
Catholic Church titles
Preceded by Joachim Hermenegilde Ouédraogo (20 November 2004 - 4 November 2011)	Bishop of Dori (31 January 2013 - 18 December 2024)	Succeeded by Théophile Naré (Apostolic Administrator: since 2 Feb 2025)
Preceded by Paul Yemboaro Ouédraogo (13 November 2010 - 18 December 2024)	Archbishop of Bobo-Dioulasso (since 18 December 2024)	Succeeded by Incumbent
