= Médard Léopold Ouédraogo =

Burkinabe Catholic prelate (born 1953)

The Most Reverend Médard Léopold Ouédraogo
- Bishop of Manga, Burkina Faso
- Church: Catholic Church
- Archdiocese: Roman Catholic Archdiocese of Ouagadougou
- See: Roman Catholic Diocese of Manga
- Appointed: 16 June 2022
- Installed: 6 August 2022
- Predecessor: Gabriel Sayaogo
- Successor: Incumbent

Orders
- Ordination: 30 June 1979
- Consecration: 11 August 2012 by Philippe Nakellentuba Ouédraogo
- Rank: Bishop

Personal details
- Born: Médard Léopold Ouédraogo; 8 June 1953 (age 72) Ouagadougou, Archdiocese of Ouagadougou, Burkina Faso

Styles of Médard Léopold Ouédraogo
- Reference style: Your Lordship; The Most Reverend
- Spoken style: His Lordship
- Religious style: Bishop

Médard Léopold Ouédraogo (born 8 June 1953) is a Burkinabe Catholic prelate who is the bishop of the Roman Catholic Diocese of Manga in Burkina Faso since 16 June 2022. Before that, from 28 May 2012 until 16 June 2022, he was the Auxiliary Bishop of the Roman Catholic Archdiocese of Ouagadougou in Burkina Faso. He was appointed bishop on 28 May 2012 by Pope Benedict XVI. The Holy Father simultaneously appointed him Titular Bishop of Sutunurca. He was ordained and installed at Ouagadougou, Burkina Faso, on 11 August 2012. While auxiliary bishop of Ouagadougou, he simultaneously served as Apostolic Administrator of the Roman Catholic Diocese of Dédougou, Burkina Faso from 3 September 2016 until 21 July 2018.

== Background, education and priesthood ==
He was born on 8 June 1953 in Ouagadougou, in the Roman Catholic Archdiocese of Ouagadougou, in Burkina Faso. He studied at St. Peter Claver Major Seminary Koumi. He was ordained a priest of the Archdiocese of Ouagadougou on 30 June 1979. He served in that role until 28 May 2012.

While a priest, he served in various roles including as Vicar General of the Catholic Archdiocese of Ouagadougou and as a lecturer at Saints Peter and Paul Major Seminary.

== As bishop ==
On 28 May 2012, Pope Benedict XVI appointed Father Médard Léopold Ouédraogo, as auxiliary bishop of the Roman Catholic Archdiocese of Ouagadougou. He was concomitantly appointed Titular Bishop of Sutunurca. He was consecrated and installed at Ouagadougou on 11 August 2012 by Archbishop Philippe Nakellentuba Ouédraogo, Archbishop of Ouagadougou assisted by Archbishop Philippe Gabriel Marie Augustin Ballot, Archbishop of Chambé and Bishop Ambroise Ouédraogo, Bishop of Maradi.

On 3 September 2016, following the death of Bishop Judes Bicaba, formerly Local Ordinary of the Roman Catholic Diocese of Dédougou, Burkina Faso, which occurred on 19 August 2016, Pope Francis appointed Bishop Léopold Médard Ouédraogo as Apostolic Administrator of Dédougou. That administratorship ceased on 21 July 2018.

On 16 June 2022, Pope Francis appointed Bishop Médard Léopold Ouédraogo, formerly Auxiliary Bishop of Ouagadougou as the new Bishop of Manga, Burkina Faso. He was installed at Manga, Burkina Faso on 6 August 2022.

== See also ==
- Catholic Church in Burkina Faso

== Succession table ==
Catholic Church titles
Preceded by	Auxiliary Bishop of Ouagadougou (28 May 2012 - 16 June 2022)	Succeeded by
Preceded by Séraphin François Rouamba (1 June 1995 - 7 December 2019)	Bishop of Manga (since 16 June 2022)	Succeeded by Incumbent
