= Dabire =

Dabire or Dabiré is a surname. Notable people with the surname include:

- Charbel Dabire (born 1997), Burkinabé football defensive back
- Christophe Joseph Marie Dabiré (born 1948), Burkinabé politician
- Gabin Dabiré (fl. 1975), Burkinabé musician
- Laurent Birfuoré Dabiré (born 1965), Burkinabé Catholic prelate
