= Diocese of Dori =

Roman Catholic diocese in Burkina Faso

Coordinates: 14.0367°N 0.0346°W

Diocese of Dori Dioecesis Doriensis

Location
- Country: Burkina Faso
- Metropolitan: Koupéla

Information
- Rite: Latin Rite
- Cathedral: Cathédrale Sainte-Anne

Current leadership
- Pope: Leo XIV
- Bishop: Vacant
- Bishops emeritus: Laurent Birfuoré Dabiré

The Roman Catholic Diocese of Dori (Latin: Dioecesis Doriensis) is a diocese located in the city of Dori in the ecclesiastical province of Koupéla in Burkina Faso.

== History ==
- November 20, 2004: Established as Diocese of Dori from the Diocese of Fada N’Gourma and Diocese of Ouahigouya

== Leadership ==
- Bishops of Dori (Roman rite)
  - Bishop Joachim Hermenegilde Ouédraogo (20 November 2004 – 4 November 2011), appointed Bishop of Koudougou
  - Bishop Laurent Birfuoré Dabiré (31 January 2013 - 18 December 2024) appointed Archbishop of Bobo-Dioulasso
- Apostolic administrators (Roman rite)
  - Bishop Théophile Naré: Apostolic Administrator (since 2 February 2025)

== See also ==
- Roman Catholicism in Burkina Faso
