= Tapsoba =

Tapsoba is a Burkinabé surname. Notable people with the surname include:

- Denis Martin Tapsoba (1916–2008), Burkinabé Roman Catholic bishop
- Edmond Tapsoba (born 1999), Burkinabé football centre-back
- Abdoul Tapsoba (born 2001), Burkinabé football forward
