= Diocese of Ouahigouya =

Roman Catholic diocese in Burkina Faso

Coordinates: 13.5774°N 2.4188°W

Diocese of Ouahigouya Dioecesis Uahiguyaensis Diocèse de Ouahigouya

Location
- Country: Burkina Faso
- Metropolitan: Archdiocese of Ouagadougou
- Headquarters: Ouahigouya, Yaadga Region, Burkina Faso

Statistics
- Area: 17,067 km^{2} (6,590 sq mi)
- Population: Total; Catholics: (as of 2023); 1,585,594; 147,755 (9.3%)
- Parishes: 14

Information
- Denomination: Catholic Church
- Sui iuris church: Latin Church
- Rite: Roman Rite
- Established: 23 June 1958; 68 years ago
- Cathedral: Cathédrale Notre Dame de la Délivrance in Ouahigouya
- Secular priests: 60 Diocesan

Current leadership
- Pope: Leo XIV
- Bishop: Justin Kientega
- Metropolitan Archbishop: Prosper Kontiebo, M.I.

The Roman Catholic Diocese of Ouahigouya is a diocese located in Ouahigouya in the ecclesiastical province of Ouagadougou in Burkina Faso.

== History ==
- 12 June 1947: Established as Apostolic Prefecture of Ouahigouya from the Apostolic Vicariate of Ouagadougou
- 14 June 1954: Suppressed to Apostolic Vicariate of Koudougou
- 23 June 1958: Restored as Diocese of Ouahigouya from the Diocese of Koudougou

== Special churches ==
The cathedral is Cathédrale Notre Dame de la Délivrance in Ouahigouya.

== Leadership ==
=== Bishops of Ouahigouya ===
- Louis-Marie-Joseph Durrieu, M. Afr. (4 July 1958 – 31 May 1965)
- Denis Martin Tapsoba, M. Afr. (15 March 1966 – 8 November 1984), resigned
- Marius Ouédraogo (8 November 1984 – 15 July 1995)
- Philippe Ouédraogo (5 July 1996 – 13 May 2009), appointed Archbishop of Ouagadougou
- Justin Kientega (2 February 2010 – Present)

=== Other priests of this diocese who became bishops ===
- Joachim Hermenegilde Ouédraogo (1991-2004), appointed Bishop of Dori in 2004
- Gabriel Sayaogo (1991-2010), appointed Bishop of Manga in 2010
- Relwendé Kisito Ouédraogo (2000-2026), appointed Titular Archbishop of Hilta in 2026

== See also ==
- Roman Catholicism in Burkina Faso
