= Diocese of Koudougou =

Roman Catholic diocese in Burkina Faso

Coordinates: 12.2550°N 2.3633°W

Diocese of Koudougou Dioecesis Kuduguensis Diocèse de Koudougou

Location
- Country: Burkina Faso
- Headquarters: Koudougou, Burkina Faso

Statistics
- Area: 26,354 km^{2} (10,175 sq mi)
- Population: Total; Catholics: (as of 2023); 2,030,000; 554,700 (27.3%)
- Parishes: 24

Information
- Denomination: Catholic Church
- Sui iuris church: Latin Church
- Rite: Roman Rite
- Established: 12 June 1947; 79 years ago
- Cathedral: Cathédrale Saint-Augustin in Koudougou
- Secular priests: 104

Current leadership
- Pope: Leo XIV
- Bishop: Joachim Hermenegilde Ouédraogo
- Metropolitan Archbishop: Prosper Kontiebo, M.I.
- Auxiliary Bishops: Alexandre Yikyi Bazié
- Apostolic Administrator: Alexandre Yikyi Bazié
- Bishops emeritus: Basile Tapsoba

The Roman Catholic Diocese of Koudougou (Latin: Dioecesis Kuduguensis) is a diocese located in the city of Koudougou in the ecclesiastical province of Ouagadougou in Burkina Faso.

== History ==
- 14 June 1954: Established as Apostolic Vicariate of Koudougou from Apostolic Prefecture of Ouahigouya
- 14 September 1955: Promoted as Diocese of Koudougou

== Special churches ==
The cathedral is the Cathédrale Saint Augustin in Koudougou.

== Bishops ==
=== Ordinaries, in reverse chronological order ===
- Bishops of Koudougou (Roman rite), below
  - Bishop Joachim Hermenegilde Ouédraogo (since 4 November 2011)
  - Bishop Basile Tapsoba (2 July 1984 – 21 May 2011), resigned
  - Bishop Anthyme Bayala (15 November 1966 – 3 April 1984)
  - Bishop Joseph-Marie-Eugène Bretault, M. Afr. (14 September 1955 – 19 November 1965), resigned; see below
- Vicar Apostolic of Koudougou (Roman rite), below
  - Bishop Joseph-Marie-Eugène Bretault, M. Afr. (27 June 1954 – 14 September 1955); see above & below
- Prefect Apostolic of Koudougou (Roman rite), below
  - Father Joseph-Marie-Eugène Bretault, M. Afr. (24 October 1947 – 27 June 1954); see above

=== Auxiliary bishops ===
- Basile Tapsoba (1981–1984), appointed Bishop here
- Alexandre Yikyi Bazié (since 25 March 2019)

=== Other priest of this diocese who became bishop ===
- Justin Kientega, appointed Bishop of Ouahigouya in 2010

== See also ==
- Roman Catholicism in Burkina Faso
