= Thévenoud =

Thévenoud is a French surname. Notable people with the surname include:

- Joanny Thévenoud (1878–1949), French Roman Catholic missionary
- Thomas Thévenoud (born 1974), French politician
