= Our Lady of Graces Cathedral, Koupéla =

Coordinates: 12.1833°N 0.3537°W

Our Lady of Graces Cathedral
- Cathédrale Notre-Dame des Grâces
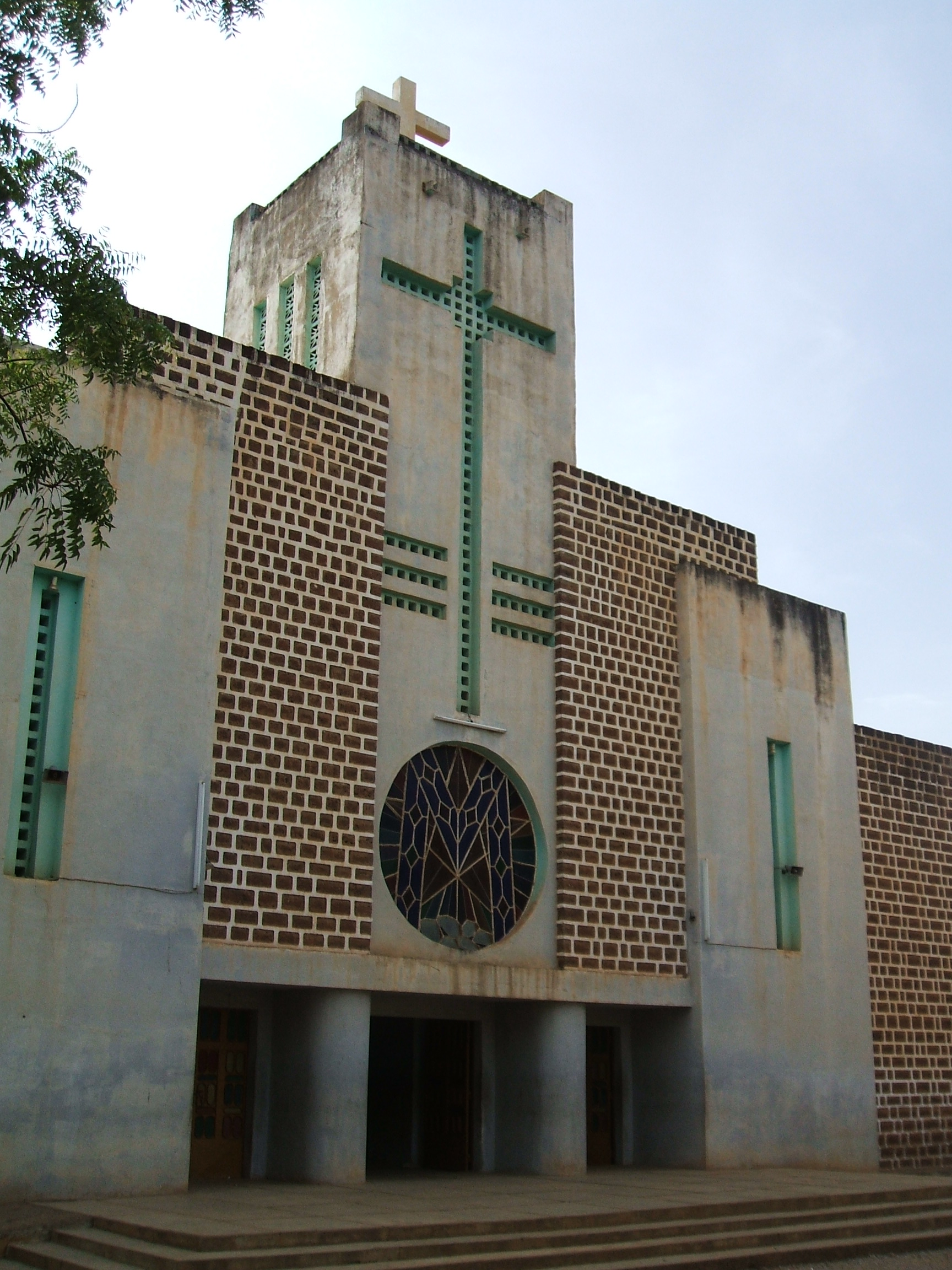
- Our Lady of Graces Cathedral
- Location: Koupéla
- Country: Burkina Faso
- Denomination: Roman Catholic Church

The Our Lady of Graces Cathedral (French: Cathédrale Notre-Dame des Grâces) also called simply Cathedral of Koupéla is a religious building belonging to the Roman Catholic Church and is located in Koupéla in the department of Koupéla, the second most populous province of Kouritenga in the African country of Burkina Faso.

There the headquarters of the Metropolitan Archdiocese of Koupéla (Archidiocèse de Koupéla or in Latin: Archidioecesis Kupelaënsis) works, the Metropolitan See for the Ecclesiastical Province of Koupéla, which was created in 2000 by bula In omnes Ecclesias of the Pope John Paul II.

== See also ==
- Roman Catholicism in Burkina Faso
- Our Lady of Grace Cathedral, Nicosia
