= Diocese of Tenkodogo =

Roman Catholic diocese in Burkina Faso

Coordinates: 11.7795°N 0.3675°W

Diocese of Tenkodogo Dioecesis Tenkodogoënsis

Location
- Country: Burkina Faso
- Metropolitan: Koupéla

Information
- Rite: Latin Rite
- Cathedral: Cathedral of Maria Regina

Current leadership
- Pope: Leo XIV
- Bishop: David Koudougou
- Bishops emeritus: Prosper Kontiebo

The Roman Catholic Diocese of Tenkodogo (Latin: Dioecesis Tenkodogoënsis) is a diocese located in the city of Tenkodogo in the ecclesiastical province of Koupéla in Burkina Faso.

== History ==
- February 11, 2012: Established as Diocese of Tenkodogo from the Archdiocese of Koupéla and the Diocese of Fada N’Gourma.

== Leadership ==
- Bishops of Tenkodogo (Roman rite)
  - Bishop Prosper Kontiebo (11 February 2012 - 16 October 2023)
  - Bishop David Koudougou (since 6 February 2025)

== See also ==
- Roman Catholicism in Burkina Faso
