= Santa Maria Consolatrice al Tiburtino =

- (St. Mary the Consoler in Tiburtino) (in Italian); S. Mariæ Consolatricis in regione Tiburtino
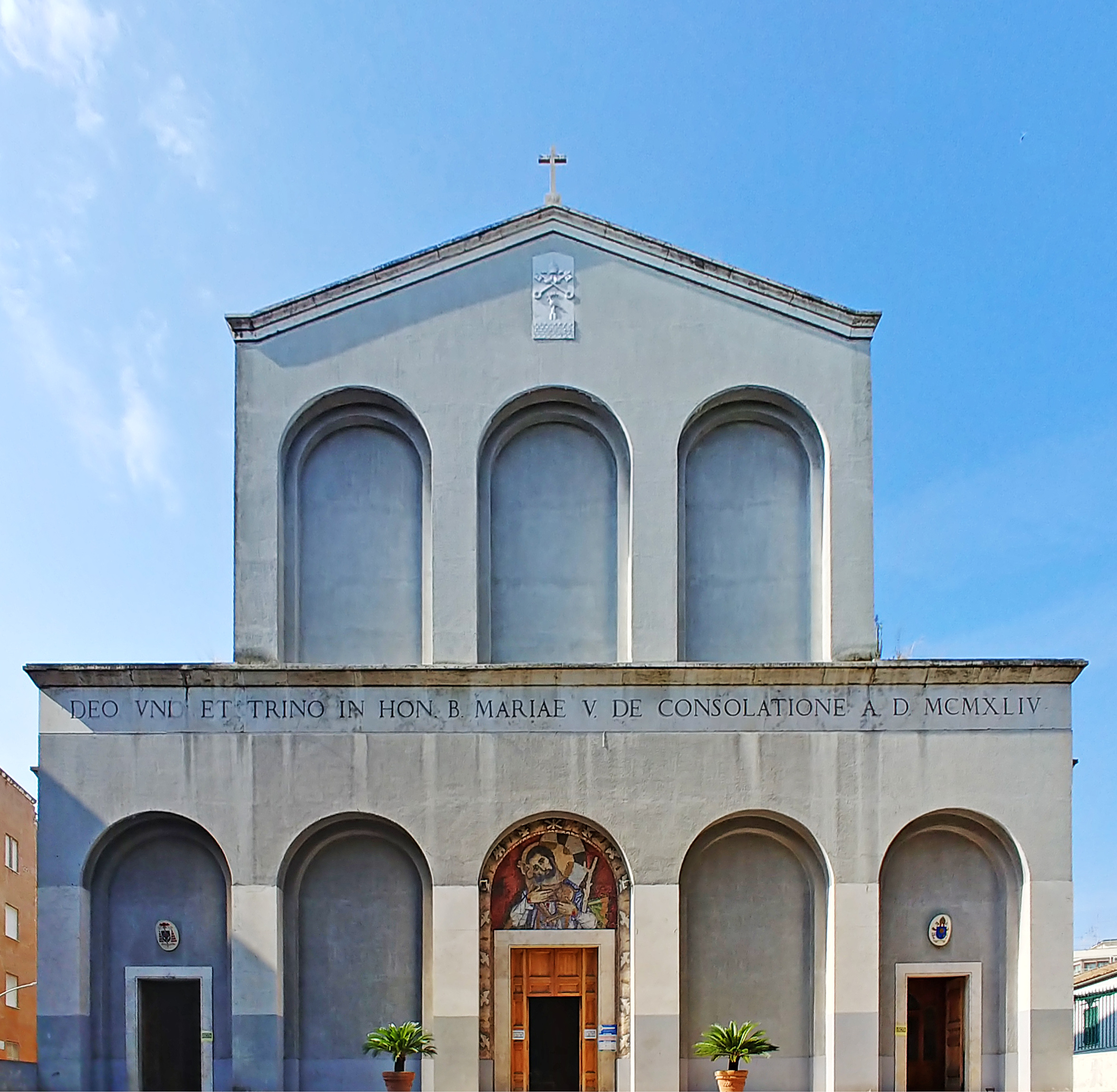
- Facade
- Click on the map for a fullscreen view
- 41°53′51″N 12°32′07″E
- Location: Via di Casal Bertone 80, Rome
- Country: Italy
- Denomination: Roman Catholic
- Tradition: Roman Rite
- Website: Official website, unsafe

History
- Status: Titular church
- Dedication: Mary, mother of Jesus
- Consecrated: 1945

Architecture
- Architect: Tullio Rossi
- Architectural type: Church
- Style: Minimalism
- Groundbreaking: 1942
- Completed: 1945

Administration
- District: Tiburtino

St. Mary the Consoler at Tiburtino (Italian: Santa Maria Consolatrice al Tiburtino) is a Roman Catholic titular parish church in Rome. It is located in Piazza Santa Maria Consolatrice, within the quartiere Tiburtino.

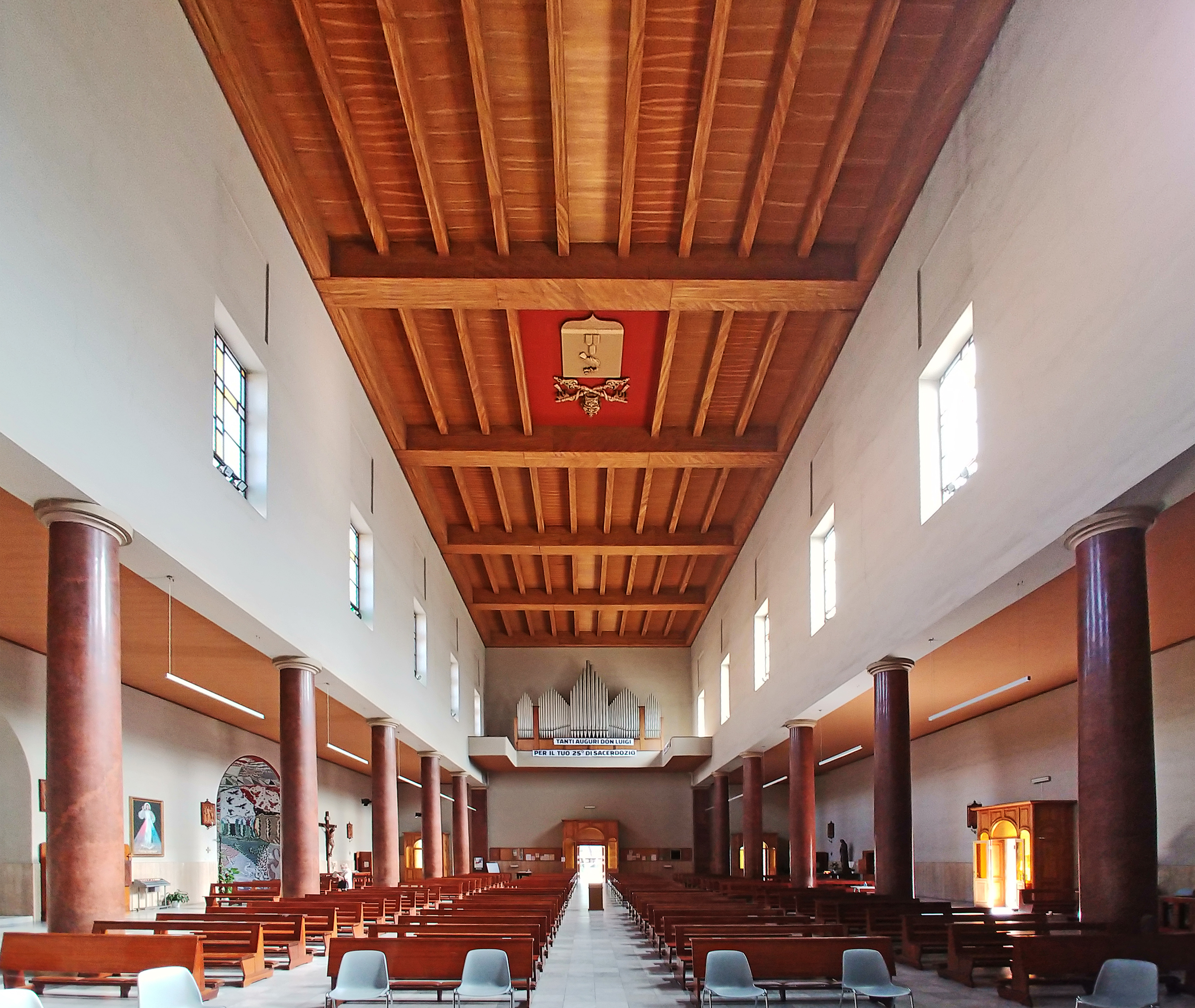
View of the interior. Note the arms of Pope Pius XII on the ceiling.

== List of Cardinal Priests ==
- Jérôme Rakotomalala, O.M.I. (1969-1975)
- Joseph Ratzinger (1977-1993)
- Ricardo María Carles Gordó (1994-2013)
- Philippe Ouédraogo (since 2014)
