= Serrières-en-Chautagne =

Serrières-en-Chautagne Sarîre (Savoyard)
- Commune
- Location of Serrières-en-Chautagne
- Location within France Location within Auvergne-Rhône-Alpes
- Coordinates: 45°52′59″N 5°50′37″E
- Country: France
- Region: Auvergne-Rhône-Alpes
- Department: Savoie
- Arrondissement: Chambéry
- Canton: Bugey savoyard
- Intercommunality: CA Grand Lac

Government
  - Mayor (2020–2026): Brigitte Tougne-Picazo
- Area^{1}: 16.04 km^{2} (6.19 sq mi)
- Highest elevation: 1,057 m (3,468 ft)
- Lowest elevation: 237 m (778 ft)
- Population (2023): 1,156
  - Density: 72.07/km^{2} (186.7/sq mi)
- Time zone: UTC+01:00 (CET)
  - Summer (DST): UTC+02:00 (CEST)
- INSEE/Postal code: 73286 /73310
- ^{1} French Land Register data, which excludes lakes, ponds, glaciers > 1 km^{2} (0.386 sq mi or 247 acres) and river estuaries.

Serrières-en-Chautagne (Savoyard: Sarîre) is a commune in the Savoie department in the Auvergne-Rhône-Alpes region in south-eastern France.

== Notable people ==
- Joanny Thévenoud (1878-1949), minister in Upper Volta

== See also ==
- Communes of the Savoie department
