= Prosper Kontiebo =

Burkinabe Catholic prelate (born 1960)

The Most Reverend Prosper Kontiebo
- Archbishop of Ouagadougou, Burkina Faso
- Church: Catholic Church
- Archdiocese: Roman Catholic Archdiocese of Ouagadougou
- See: Ouagadougou
- Appointed: 16 October 2023
- Installed: 16 December 2023
- Predecessor: Philippe Nakellentuba Ouédraogo
- Successor: Incumbent

Orders
- Ordination: 7 July 1990
- Consecration: 2 June 2012 by Séraphin François Rouamba
- Rank: Bishop

Personal details
- Born: Prosper Kontiebo; 25 June 1960 (age 65) Boassa, Archdiocese of Ouagadougou, Burkina Faso
- Motto: "Deus Caritas Est" (God is Love)

Styles of Prosper Kontiebo
- Reference style: Your Lordship; The Most Reverend
- Spoken style: His Lordship
- Religious style: Archbishop

Prosper Kontiebo (born 25 June 1960) is a Burkinabe Catholic prelate who is the archbishop of the Roman Catholic Archdiocese of Ouagadougou in Burkina Faso since 16 October 2023. Before that, from 11 February 2012 until 16 October 2023, he was the bishop of the Diocese of Tenkodogo, Burkina Faso. He is a professed member of the Order of Ministers of the Sick (Camillians). He was installed as archbishop of Ouagadougou on 16 December 2023.

== Background and education ==
He was born on 25 June 1960 in Boassa, in the Archdiocese of Ouagadougou. He was baptized on 1 July 1960. He attended primary school in Zagtouli from 1967 until 1974. From 1974 until 1978, he studied at the Saint Camille Garçons Juniorate, a junior seminary in Ouagadougou. He then took one year of spiritual reflection from 1978 until 1979.

From 1979 until 1983, he studied at the Inter-Seminary of Saint Peter and Saint Paul at Kossoghin, Burkina Faso. He then spent one year at Saint Camille Novitiate in Ouagadougou from 1983 until 1984. He studied philosophy at the Saint Jean-Baptiste Major Seminary in Wayalghin, Ouagadougou from 1984 until 1986. From 1986 until 1990, he studied Theology at the Major Seminary of Saint Pierre-Claver de Koumi in Bobo-Dioulasso. He then studied nursing at the Burkina Faso National School of Public Health in Ouagadougou, from 1990 until 1993, graduating with a "State Nursing Diploma".

== Priesthood ==
He took his preliminary vows as a member of the Camillians on 8 September 1984. He took his perpetual vows of that order on 8 September 1988. On 25 June 1989, he was ordained a Deacon of the Order of Ministers of the Sick. He was ordained a priest of the same religious order on 7 July 1990 at Ouagadougou. He served as priest until 11 February 2012. He served in various roles and locations while a priest, including as detailed in this reference.

== As bishop ==
On 11 February 2012, Pope Benedict XVI appointed Father Monsignor Prosper Kontiebo, M.I. as the new bishop of the Roman Catholic Diocese of Tenkodogo, which The Holy Father created that day. He was consecrated and installed at Tenkodogo on 2 June 2012 by the hands of Archbishop Séraphin François Rouamba, Archbishop of Koupéla assisted by Archbishop Philippe Nakellentuba Ouédraogo, Archbishop of Ouagadougou and Bishop Thomas Kaboré, Bishop of Kaya.

On 16 October 2023, Pope Francis accepted the resignation from pastoral care of the Metropolitan Province of Ouagadougou presented by Cardinal Philippe Nakellentuba Ouédraogo. The Holy Father appointed Bishop Prosper Kontiebo, formerly Bishop of the Diocese of Tenkodogo, as Metropolitan Archbishop of Ouagadougou, Burkina Faso, effective that day. The new archbishop was installed at Ouagadougou on 16 December 2023.

== See also ==
- Catholic Church in Burkina Faso

== Succession table ==
Catholic Church titles
Preceded by None (Diocese created)	Bishop of Tenkodogo (11 February 2012 - 16 October 2023)	Succeeded by David Koudougou (since 6 February 2025)
Preceded by Philippe Nakellentuba Ouédraogo (13 May 2009 - 16 October 2023)	Archbishop of Ouagadougou (since 6 February 2025)	Succeeded by Incumbent
