= Temnaoré, Bam =

Village in Kongoussi Department, Burkina Faso

Temnaoré
- Location in Burkina Faso
- Coordinates: 13°26′N 1°44′W
- Country: Burkina Faso
- Region: Centre-Nord Region
- Province: Bam Province
- Department: Kongoussi Department

Population (2019)
  - Total: 4,359
- Time zone: UTC+0 (GMT 0)

Temnaoré is a town in the Kongoussi Department of Bam Province in northern Burkina Faso.

Population
Year	Pop.	±%
1985	1,503	—
2006	2,606	+73.4%
2019	4,359	+67.3%
