= Ricardo María Carles Gordó =

His Eminence Ricardo María Carles Gordó
- Archbishop Emeritus of Barcelona
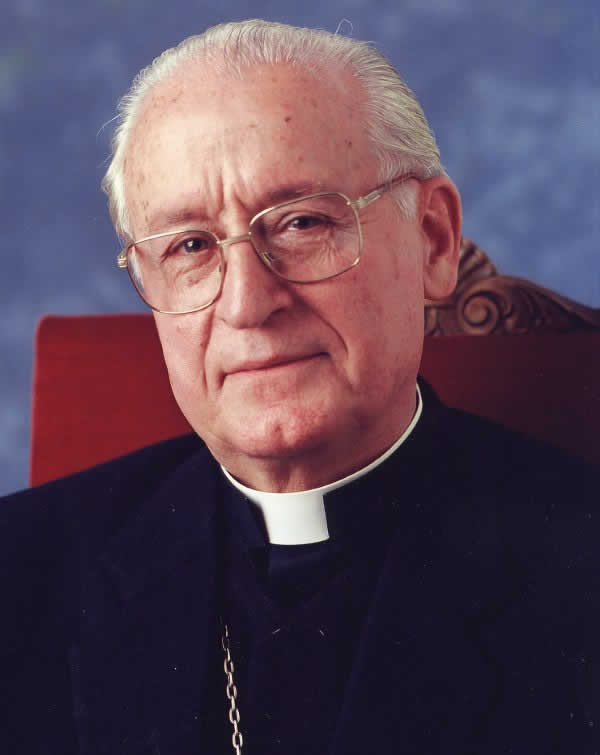
- Church: Roman Catholic Church
- Archdiocese: Barcelona
- See: Barcelona
- Appointed: 23 March 1990
- Term ended: 15 June 2004
- Predecessor: Narciso Jubany Arnau
- Successor: Lluís Martínez Sistach
- Other post: Cardinal-Priest of Santa Maria Consolatrice al Tiburtino (1994–2013)
- Previous posts: Bishop of Tortosa (1969–90); Vice-President of the Spanish Episcopal Conference (1999–2002)

Orders
- Ordination: 29 June 1951 by Marcelino Olaechea Loizaga
- Consecration: 3 August 1969 by Luigi Dadaglio
- Created cardinal: 26 November 1994 by Pope John Paul II
- Rank: Cardinal-Priest

Personal details
- Born: Ricardo María Carles Gordó; 24 September 1926 Valencia, Kingdom of Spain
- Died: 17 December 2013 (aged 87) Hospital Santa Cruz, Tortosa, Catalonia, Spain
- Buried: Valencia Cathedral
- Parents: Fermín Carles; Josefina Gordó
- Education: Pontifical University of Salamanca
- Motto: Ut omnes unum sint
- Coat of arms

Styles of Ricardo Carles Gordó
- Reference style: His Eminence
- Spoken style: Your Eminence
- Religious style: Cardinal
- Posthumous style: not applicable
- Informal style: Cardinal

Ricardo María Carles Gordó (24 September 1926 – 17 December 2013) was a cardinal priest and Archbishop Emeritus of Barcelona in the Catholic Church.

== Biography ==
Born in Valencia, Spain, Carles Gordó was ordained a priest on 29 June 1951.

He studied at Teresian school in Valencia; then, he completed his secondary education at the Jesuit Colegio de San José. He entered the Seminary of Valencia, where he was a pupil at Colegio "Corpus Christi" and finally, he studied at the Pontifical University of Salamanca, where he obtained a licenciate in canon law in 1951–1953.

After his studies he served in pastoral ministry in the archdiocese of Valencia, including parish priest, rector of the parish of San Fernando in Valencia (1967); counselor of the Juventud Obrera Católica, JOC (Catholic Youth Workers); director of the boarding-school for deacons; vicar for clergy; and diocesan counselor for the pastoral for the family.

In 1969 he was appointed Bishop of Tortosa, and later as archbishop of Barcelona in 1990, a post he held until stepping down in 2004. He was made a cardinal by Pope John Paul II in the consistory of 26 November 1994 and held the title of Cardinal-Priest of Santa Maria Consolatrice al Tiburtino. He was one of the cardinal electors who participated in the 2005 papal conclave that selected Pope Benedict XVI.

He died on 17 December 2013.
