= Paul Zoungrana =

Burkinabé Cardinal

His Eminence Paul Zoungrana M. Afr.
- Archbishop Emeritus of Ouagadougou
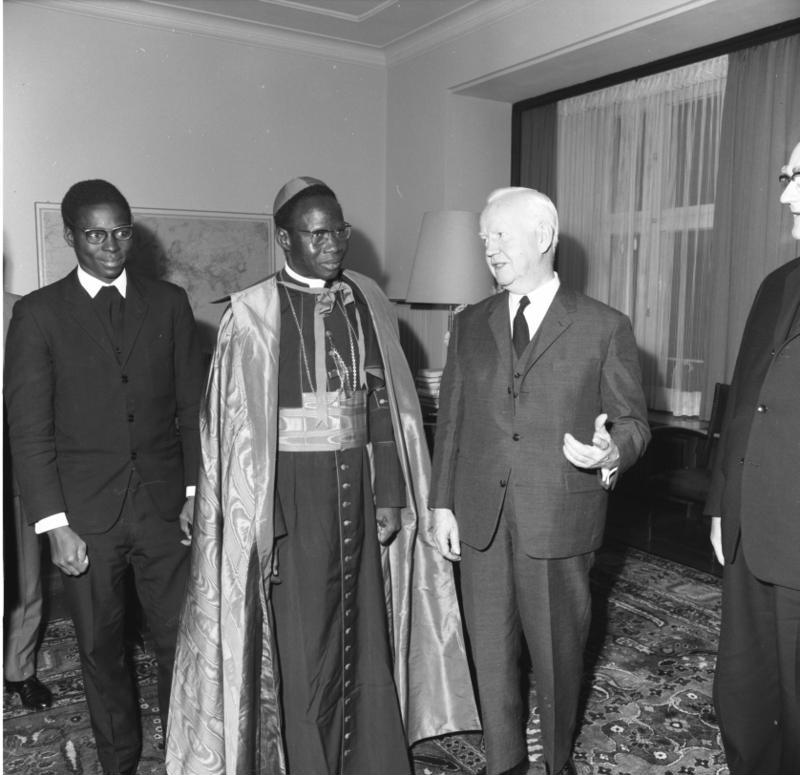
- Cardinal Zoungrana with Heinrich Lübke in 1966.
- Church: Roman Catholic Church
- Archdiocese: Ouagadougou
- See: Ouagadougou
- Appointed: 5 April 1960
- Term ended: 4 June 2000
- Predecessor: Emile-Joseph Socquet
- Successor: Jean-Marie Untaani Compaoré

Orders
- Ordination: 2 May 1942
- Consecration: 8 May 1960 by Pope John XXIII
- Created cardinal: 22 February 1965 by Pope Paul VI
- Rank: Cardinal-Priest

Personal details
- Born: Paul Zoungrana; 3 September 1917 Ouagadougou, Upper Volta
- Died: 4 June 2000 (aged 82) Ouagadougou, Burkina Faso
- Coat of arms

Paul Zoungrana, MAfr (3 September 1917 – 4 June 2000) was a Burkinabé Cardinal of the Roman Catholic Church. He served as Archbishop of Ouagadougou from 1960 to 1995, and was elevated to the cardinalate in 1965.

== Life and church ==
Paul Zoungrana was born in Ouagadougou, Upper Volta (modern Burkina Faso). He studied at the minor seminary in Pabré and major seminary in Koumi, where he was ordained to the priesthood on 2 May 1942. Zoungrana, one of his country's first three priests, then did pastoral work in his native Ouagadougou until joining the Society of Missionaries of Africa on 24 September 1948, later taking his final vows in 1952 at Rome. From 1948 to 1953, he furthered his studies at the Pontifical Gregorian University, from where he obtained his doctorate in canon law; and the Catholic Institute of Paris. Zoungrana taught canon law at the seminary of Koumi, whilst again carrying out his pastoral ministry in Ouagadougou, from 1954 to 1959. He then served as Director of the Social Information Center until 1960.

On 8 April 1960 Zoungrana was appointed Archbishop of Ouagadougou by Pope John XXIII. He received his episcopal consecration on the following 8 May from Pope John XXIII himself, with Bishops Napoléon-Alexandre La Brie and Fulton J. Sheen serving as co-consecrators, in St. Peter's Basilica. Archbishop Zoungrana later attended the Second Vatican Council from 1962 to 1965. With the assistance of Cardinals José Quintero Parra and José Bueno y Monreal, he delivered one of the closing messages of the Council on 8 December 1965. Pope Paul VI created him Cardinal Priest of San Camillo de Lellis in the consistory of 22 February 1965. He was the first cardinal from Upper Volta, and the only one belonging to the White Fathers.

Zoungrana was one of the cardinal electors who participated in the conclaves of August and October 1978, which selected Popes John Paul I and John Paul II respectively. The Cardinal later served as special papal envoy to the second National Eucharistic Congress and to the closing of the centennial of evangelization in Zaire. From 1980 to 1987, he was a member of the General Secretariat of the Synod of Bishops.

Zoungrana encouraged the Africanization of the liturgy, saying that the rituals "represent an African way of thinking and way of life". He also led a protest against the World Bank for its policy of refusing financial aid to countries without population planning programs. Cardinal Zoungrana resigned as Ouagadougou's archbishop on 10 June 1995, after thirty-five years of service.

He died in Ouagadougou, at age 82, and is there buried at the Cathedral of the Immaculate Conception. At the time of his death he was the last surviving Cardinal elevated by Pope Paul VI in the 1965 Consistory.

Catholic Church titles
Preceded by Emile-Joseph Socquet, MAfr	Archbishop of Ouagadougou; 1960–1995	Succeeded by Jean-Marie Untaani Compaoré
