= Philippe Ouédraogo (cardinal) =

Burkinabé prelate (born 1945)

His Eminence Philippe Nakellentuba Ouédraogo
- Cardinal; Archbishop emeritus of Ouagadougou
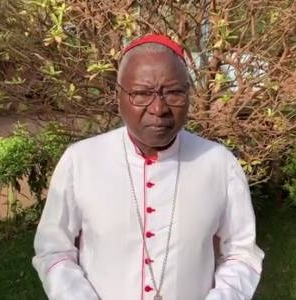
- Church: Roman Catholic Church
- Archdiocese: Ouagadougou
- See: Ouagadougou
- Appointed: 13 May 2009
- Term ended: 16 October 2023
- Predecessor: Jean-Marie Untaani Compaoré
- Successor: Prosper Kontiebo
- Other post: Cardinal-Priest of Consolatrice al Tiburtino (2014–)
- Previous posts: Bishop of Ouahigouya (1996–2009); President of the Episcopal Conference of Burkina Faso and Niger (2001–2007)

Orders
- Ordination: 14 July 1973
- Consecration: 23 November 1996 by Jean-Marie Untaani Compaoré
- Created cardinal: 22 February 2014 by Pope Francis
- Rank: Cardinal-Priest

Personal details
- Born: Philippe Ouédraogo; 1945 (age 80–81) Konéan, French West Africa (now Burkina Faso)
- Motto: In vinculo Caritatis, annuntiemus Iesum Christum (With bands of love, proclaim Jesus Christ)
- Coat of arms: Philippe Nakellentuba Ouédraogo's coat of arms

Ordination history of Philippe Ouédraogo
History
Episcopal consecration
- Principal consecrator: Jean Marie Untaani Compaore
- Co-consecrators: Leon-Raymond Soulier; Constantin Guirma
Cardinalate
- Elevated by: Pope Francis
Episcopal succession
Bishops consecrated by Philippe Ouédraogo as principal consecrator
- Joachim Ouédraogo: 19 March 2005
- Justin Kientaga: 29 May 2010
- Médard Léopold Ouédraogo: 11 August 2012

Styles of Philippe Ouédraogo
- Reference style: His Eminence
- Spoken style: Your Eminence
- Religious style: Cardinal
- Informal style: Cardinal

Philippe Nakellentuba Ouédraogo ([filip we.dʁa.o.ɡo]; born 1945 (Note: Ouédraogo's true birth date is not known. He needed a birth date to participate in a missionary health insurance program in 1973, so provided a random one, January 25, 1945; this was recorded by the Vatican until 2024. However, his official date was recorded by Burkina Faso as December 31, a placeholder value used for unknown birth dates, 1945; this date was recorded in the 2025 Vatican directory. The exact date was of little importance until the date of his 80th birthday came to determine Ouédraogo's eligibility to vote in the 2025 election of a new pope.)) is a Burkinabé Catholic retired prelate who served as Archbishop of Ouagadougou from 2009 to 2023. He was made a cardinal in 2014. He was previously Bishop of Ouahigouya from 1996 to 2009.

== Biography ==
He was born in 1945 in Konéan in Kaya Department. He studied at the Petit Séminaire de Pabré in Ouagadougou from 1959 to 1967 and then at the Grand Séminaire Régional de Koumi in Bobo-Dioulasso from 1967 to 1973.

He was ordained a priest of the diocese of Kaya on 4 July 1973. After serving for five years as vicar of the cathedral parish, he studied at the Pontifical Urbaniana University in Rome from 1979 to 1983, earning a doctorate in canon law. He returned to Kaya and from 1983 to 1996 he performed parish work while serving at the same time as vicar general of the Kaya Diocese and director of its seminary.

He was appointed bishop of Ouahigouya on 5 July 1996 and consecrated on 23 November 1996 by Jean-Marie Untaani Compaoré, Archbishop of Ouagadougou.

Pope Benedict XVI named him archbishop of Ouagadougou on 13 May 2009.

He was president of the Episcopal Conference of Burkina Faso and Niger from 2001 to 2007.

Pope Francis made him a cardinal on 22 February 2014 and assigned to him the titular church of Santa Maria Consolatrice al Tiburtino. He was the second cardinal from Burkina Faso, following Paul Zoungrana (1917–2000).

He was named a member of the Congregation for the Evangelization of Peoples and the Pontifical Council for Inter Religious Dialogue on 22 May 2014 and of the Congregation for Divine Worship and the Discipline of the Sacraments on 28 October 2016.

He received a papal appointment to participate in the Synod on the Family in October 2014 and October 2015.

In July 2019 he was elected president of the Symposium of Episcopal Conferences of Africa and Madagascar (SECAM). He was in charge until 2023. Ouedraogo was diagnosed with COVID-19 on 30 March 2020, but has recovered from the virus since.

Pope Francis accepted his resignation as archbishop on 16 October 2023.

Cardinals were eligible to vote in the 2025 papal conclave if they were less than 80 years old on 21 April 2025, the day of Pope Francis's death; as it is not known if Ouedraogo was 79 or 80, there was confusion as to his eligibility. However, he was ultimately included as a cardinal elector in the conclave, which elected Pope Leo XIV.

== See also ==
- Cardinals created by Francis

Catholic Church titles
Preceded by Marius Ouedraogo	Bishop of Ouahigouya; 1996–2009	Succeeded by Justin Kientaga
Preceded by Jean-Marie Untaani Compaoré	Archbishop of Ouagadougou; 2009–2023	Succeeded by Prosper Kontiebo
Preceded by Ricardo Maria Carles Gordo	Cardinal Priest of Santa Maria Consolatrice al Tiburtino; 2014–present	Incumbent
