= Denis Martin Tapsoba =

Denis Martin Tapsoba M. Afr.
- Bishop of Ouahigouya
- Church: Catholic Church
- Diocese: Diocese of Ouahigouya
- In office: 15 March 1966 – 8 November 1984
- Predecessor: Louis-Marie-Joseph Durrieu
- Successor: Marius Ouédraogo

Orders
- Ordination: 6 May 1944
- Consecration: 16 October 1966 by Franz König

Personal details
- Born: 6 July 1916 Ouagadougou, Colony of Upper Senegal and Niger, French West Africa, French Empire
- Died: 13 March 2008 (aged 91)

Denis Martin Tapsoba (6 July 1916 − 13 March 2008) was a Burkinabé Roman Catholic bishop.

Ordained to the priesthood on 6 May 1944, Tapsoba was named bishop of Roman Catholic Diocese of Ouahigouya, Burkina Faso on 15 March 1966 and resigned on 8 November 1984.
