= Dieudonné Yougbaré =

- Bishop of the Archdiocese of Koupéla (emeritus)
- Church: Roman Catholic Church
- See: Archdiocese of Koupéla
- In office: 1956–1995
- Predecessor: None
- Successor: Séraphin François Rouamba
- Previous post: Priest

Orders
- Ordination: April 8, 1945

Personal details
- Born: February 16, 1917 Koupéla, Burkina Faso
- Died: November 4, 2011 (aged 94)

Dieudonné Yougbaré (February 16, 1917 – November 4, 2011) was a Burkinabé-born bishop of the Roman Catholic Church. At the time of his death he was one of the oldest Catholic bishops and the oldest one from Burkina Faso.

Yougbaré was born in Koupéla, Burkina Faso, and was ordained priest on April 8, 1945. He was appointed the bishop of the Archdiocese of Koupéla (which was then a diocese) on February 29, 1956, where he remained until his retirement on June 1, 1995.
