= Joanny Thévenoud =

French priest

Joanny Thévenoud M. Afr.
- Apostolic Vicar of Ouagadougou
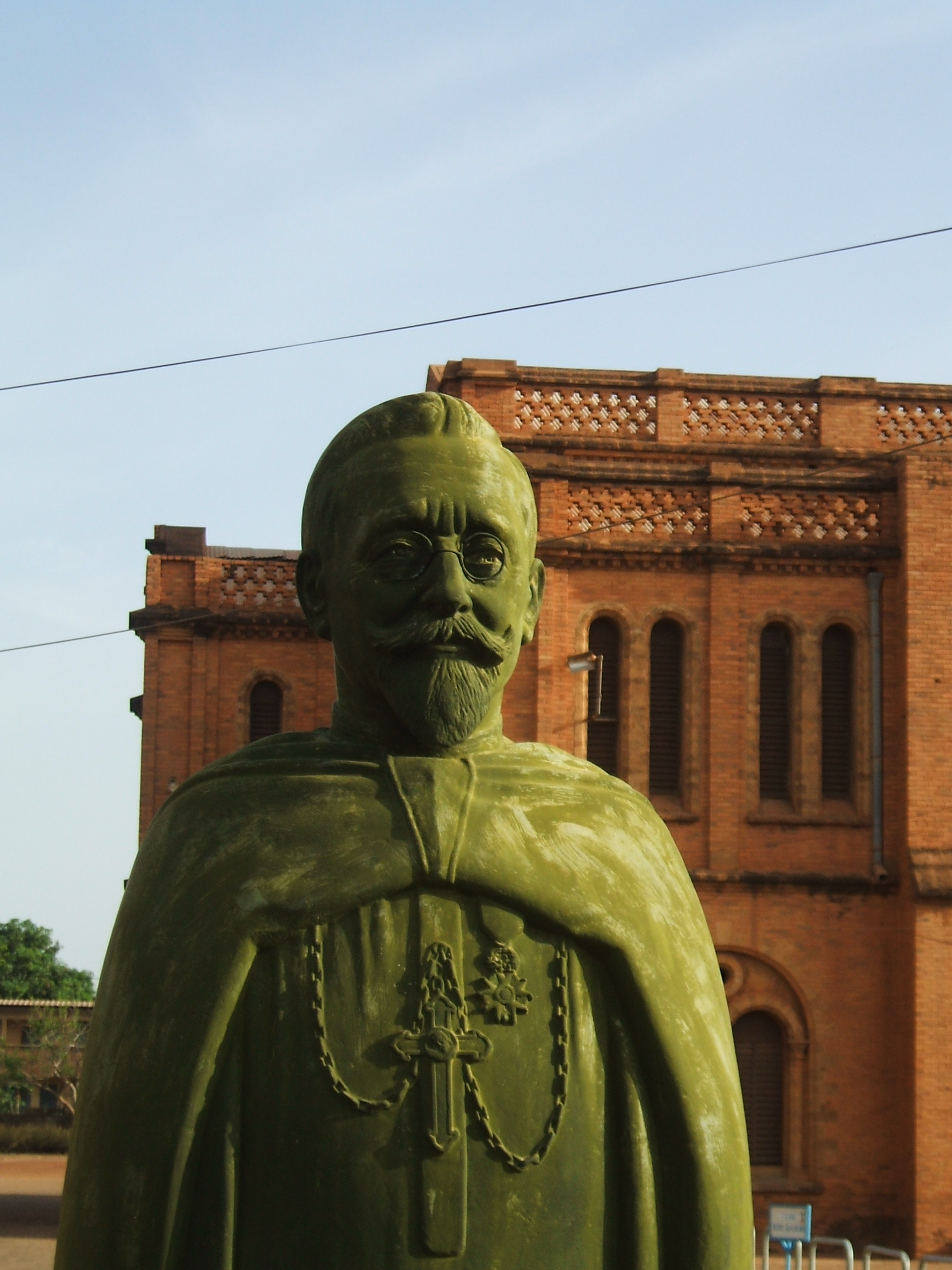
- Statue of Joanny Thévenoud in front of the Ouagadougou Cathedral
- Church: Catholic Church
- See: Apostolic Vicariate of Ouagadougou
- In office: 8 July 1921 – 16 September 1949
- Predecessor: Vicariate established
- Successor: Emile-Joseph Socquet
- Other post: Titular Bishop of Sitifis (1921-1949)

Orders
- Ordination: 28 June 1903
- Consecration: 1 May 1922 by Dominique Castellan

Personal details
- Born: 14 March 1878 Serrières-en-Chautagne, Savoie, France
- Died: 16 September 1949 (aged 71) Ouagadougou, Upper Volta, French West Africa, French Empire

Joanny Thévenoud (14 March 1878 – 16 September 1949) was a French apostolic vicar of the White Fathers, best remembered for his missionary, ecclesiastical and public development work in Upper Volta (now Burkina Faso).

== Biography ==
Born in Serrières-en-Chautagne in 1878, he was ordained for the Congregation of the White Fathers in Carthage on 28 June 1903, and was sent to Ouagadougou, where he arrived on 11 November 1903. There, he was appointed a superior at the missionary in 1907. In subsequent decades, he was responsible for a number of important development works in Upper Volta, including the ordering of the first dam in 1915 (Akosombo Dam), the establishment of a sewing centre for young Christian girls in 1917, a spinning and carpentry centre for men in 1927, and ordering construction of Ouagadougou Cathedral, built in 1934-1936.

In the 1930s, Thévenoud brought the matter of pawnship and child marriages to the colonial administration. Though slavery had been banned since 1905, one could still pawn a young relative to gain funds to settle a debt or pay taxes. To those without other property to mortgage, people became the collateral. The pawn served to offset the interest and debt maintenance, but did not work to pay off the debt. When the borrower had repaid, the pawn was returned. Authorities had tried to avoid getting involved in the local custom but by the 1930s, pressure from Thévenoud and his supporter, French Senator Gustave Gautherot, forced the colonial administration to repress pawnship, treating it like slavery. Because so many of the pawned victims were young women and girls, the change in policy toward pawnship also resulted in a series of measures to ban child marriages.

Thévenoud was appointed the first vicar apostolic of Ouagadougou on 8 July 1921. In 1942, Thévenoud established the first normal school of teachers of the mission, and five years later, set up the Young Christian Students Association. He died on 16 September 1949, in Ouagadougou, and was buried at the cathedral.
