= Archdiocese of Koupéla =

Roman Catholic archdiocese in Burkina Faso

Coordinates: 12.1833°N 0.3536°W

Archdiocese of Koupéla Archidioecesis Kupelaensis Archidiocèse de Koupéla
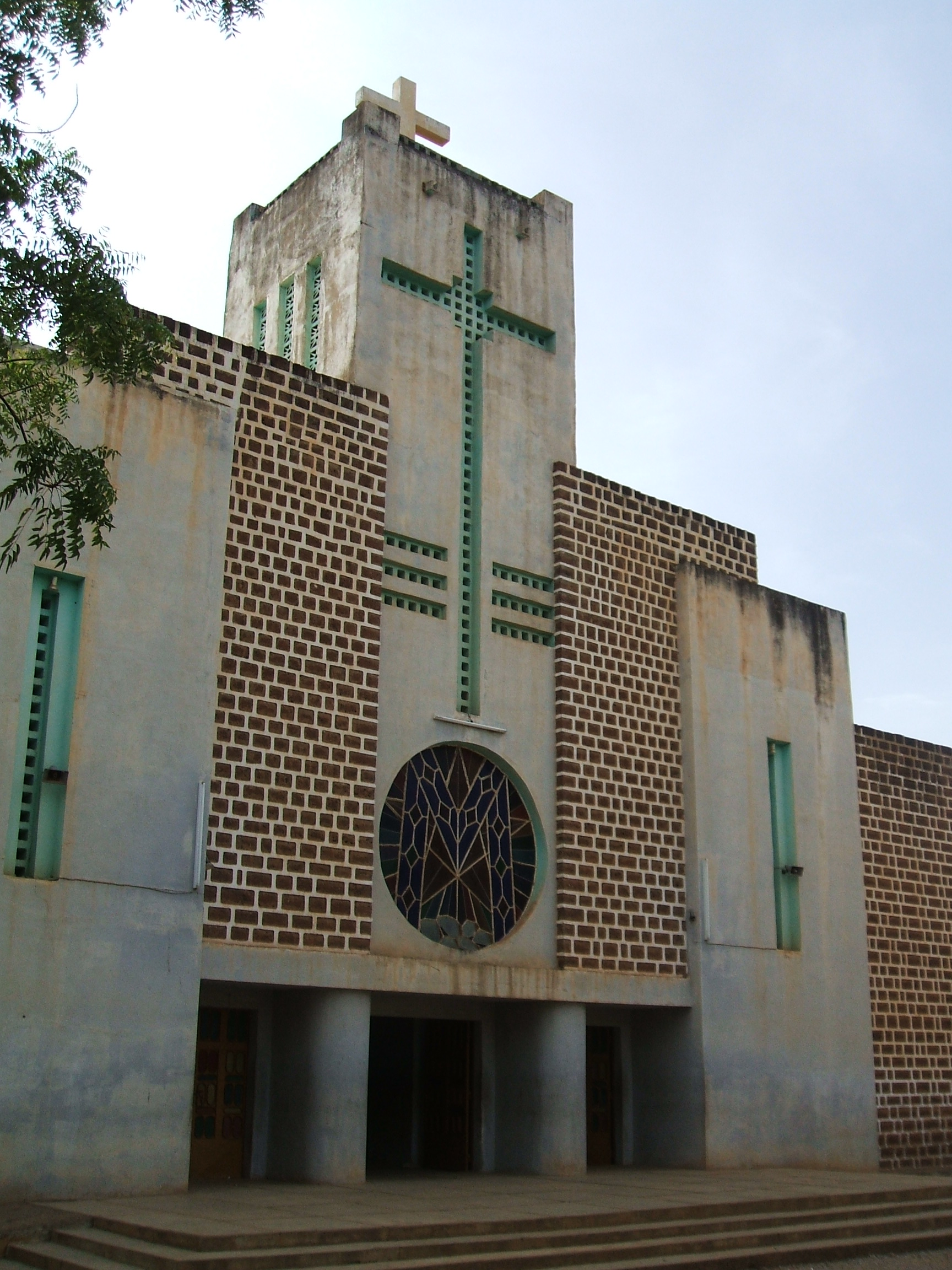
- The Cathedral of Koupéla in 2007

Location
- Country: Burkina Faso
- Headquarters: Koupéla, Burkina Faso

Statistics
- Area: 7,181 km^{2} (2,773 sq mi)
- Population: Total; Catholics: (as of 2023); 1,035,951; 247,629 (23.9%)
- Parishes: 12

Information
- Denomination: Catholic Church
- Sui iuris church: Latin Church
- Rite: Roman Rite
- Established: 20 February 1956; 70 years ago
- Cathedral: Our Lady of Graces Cathedral, Koupéla
- Secular priests: 65
- Metropolitan Archbishop: Gabriel Sayaogo
- Bishops emeritus: Séraphin François Rouamba

The Archdiocese of Koupéla (Latin: Archidioecesis Kupelaënsis) is the Metropolitan See for the ecclesiastical province of Koupéla in Burkina Faso.

== History ==
- 20 February 1956: Established as Diocese of Koupéla from the Metropolitan Archdiocese of Ouagadougou
- 5 December 2000: Promoted as Metropolitan Archdiocese of Koupéla

== Special churches ==
The seat of the archbishop is Our Lady of Graces Cathedral (French: Cathédrale Notre Dame des Grâces) in Koupéla.

== Bishops ==
=== Ordinaries, in reverse chronological order ===
- Metropolitan Archbishops of Koupéla (Roman rite), below
  - Archbishop Gabriel Sayaogo 7 December 2019 – present
  - Archbishop Séraphin François Rouamba 5 December 2000 – 7 December 2019; see below
- Bishops of Koupéla (Roman rite), below
  - Bishop Séraphin François Rouamba 1 June 1995 – 5 December 2000; see above
  - Bishop Dieudonné Yougbaré 29 February 1956 – 1 June 1995

=== Other priests of this diocese who became bishops ===
- Pierre Claver Malgo, appointed Bishop of Fada N’Gourma in 2012
- Théophile Nare, appointed Bishop of Kaya in 2018

== Suffragan Dioceses ==
- Dori
- Fada N’Gourma
- Kaya
- Tenkodogo

== Sources ==
- GCatholic.org
