= Séraphin François Rouamba =

Burkinabe Catholic prelate (born in 1942)

The Most Reverend Séraphin François Rouamba
- Archbishop Emeritus of Koupéla, Burkina Faso
- Church: Catholic Church
- Archdiocese: Roman Catholic Archdiocese of Koupéla
- See: Koupéla
- Appointed: 5 December 2000
- Installed: 5 December 2000
- Term ended: 7 December 2019
- Predecessor: Dieudonné Yougbaré
- Successor: Gabriel Sayaogo
- Other post(s): Bishop of the Roman Catholic Diocese of Koupéla (1 June 1995 - 5 December 2000)

Orders
- Ordination: 27 June 1970
- Consecration: 21 October 1995 by Antonio Mattiazzo
- Rank: Archbishop

Personal details
- Born: Séraphin François Rouamba; 1 January 1942 (age 83); Ouagadougou, Archdiocese of Ouagadougou, Burkina Faso

Styles of Séraphin François Rouamba
- Reference style: Your Lordship; The Most Reverend
- Spoken style: His Lordship
- Religious style: Bishop

Séraphin François Rouamba (born 1942) is a Burkinabe Catholic prelate who served as Archbishop of the Roman Catholic Archdiocese of Koupéla, from December 2000 until his retirement in 2019. Before that, from 1 June 1995 until 5 December 2000, he was the bishop of the Roman Catholic Diocese of Koupéla, Burkina Faso. He was appointed bishop on 1 June 1995 by Pope John Paul II. He was consecrated and installed at Koupéla, on 21 October 1995 by Archbishop Antonio Mattiazzo, Bishop of Padua. On 5 December 2000, The Holy Father appointed him archbishop of the Metropolitan Province of Koupéla, when the diocese was elevated to an archdiocese. He resigned as archbishop on 7 December 2019 and lives on as Archbishop Emeritus of Koupéla, Burkina Faso.

== Background and priesthood ==
He was born in 1942 at Ouagadougou, in the Archdiocese of Ouagadougou. After studying philosophy and theology at seminary, he was ordained a priest on 27 June 1970. He served as a priest until 1 June 1995.

== As bishop ==
On 1 June 1995, Pope John Paul II appointed him as bishop of the Roman Catholic Diocese of Koupéla. He was consecrated and installed at Koupéla, Burkina Faso on 21 October 1995 by the hands of Archbishop Antonio Mattiazzo, Bishop of Padua assisted by Archbishop Luigi Ventura, Titular Archbishop of Equilium and Archbishop Jean-Marie Untaani Compaoré, Archbishop of Ouagadougou.

On 5 December 2000, The Holy See elevated the diocese of Koupéla, to the Roman Catholic Archdiocese of Koupéla. Pope John Paul II appointed the first archbishop of the new metropolitan province. He served in that capacity until his retirement on 7 December 2019, the day his successor Archbishop Gabriel Sayaogo was appointed to succeed at Koupéla.

While archbishop at Koupéla, Archbishop Séraphin François Rouamba, served as president of the Episcopal Conference of Burkina Faso and Niger.

== See also ==
- Catholic Church in Burkina Faso

== Succession table ==
Catholic Church titles
Preceded by Dieudonné Yougbaré (29 February 1956 - 1 June 1995)	Bishop of Koupéla (1 June 1995 - 5 December 2000)	Succeeded by None (Diocese elevated to Archdiocese)
Preceded by None (Archdiocese created)	Archbishop of Koupéla (5 December 2000 - 7 December 2019)	Succeeded by Gabriel Sayaogo (since 7 December 2019)
