= Ouagadougou Cathedral =

Cathedral in Ouagadougou, Burkina Faso

Coordinates: 12°21′43″N 1°31′37″W

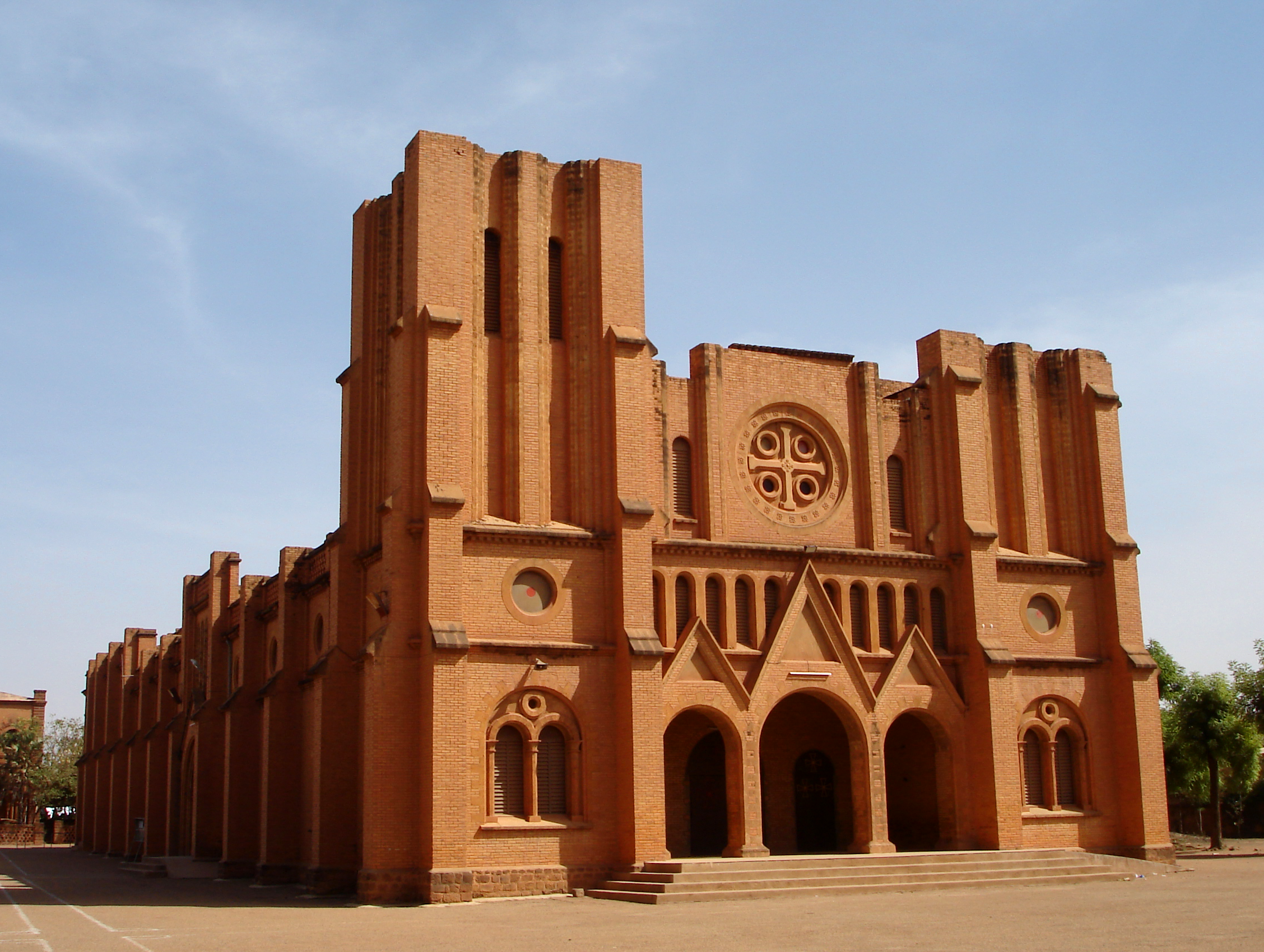
- Interactive map of Ouagadougou Cathedral

Ouagadougou Cathedral, or the Cathedral of the Immaculate Conception of Ouagadougou (French: Cathédrale de l'Immaculée-Conception de Ouagadougou) is the cathedral of the Roman Catholic Archdiocese of Ouagadougou in Ouagadougou, the capital of Burkina Faso. It was built in the 1930s, by apostolic vicar Joanny Thévenoud from the White Fathers, at the time of French West Africa, and was dedicated on 19 January 1936, after a two-year construction. Behind the cathedral, near the carpark, is an altar dedicated to Mary, Ave Maria, with a statue of the Virgin in a carved stone arch.
