= Ouahigouya =

Town in Nord Region, Burkina Faso

Ouahigouya Wayugyã (Mossi)
- City
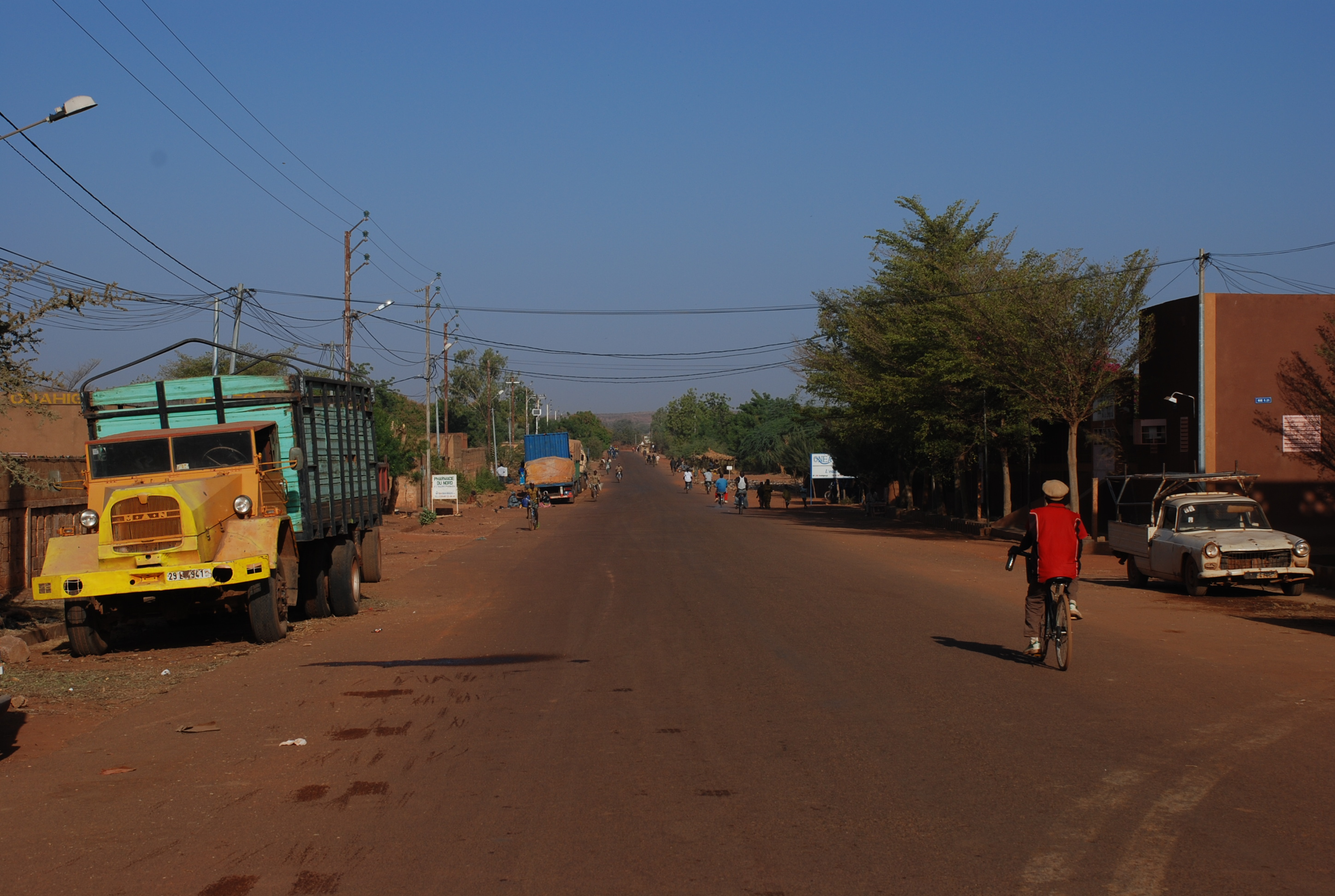
- View of Ouahigouya

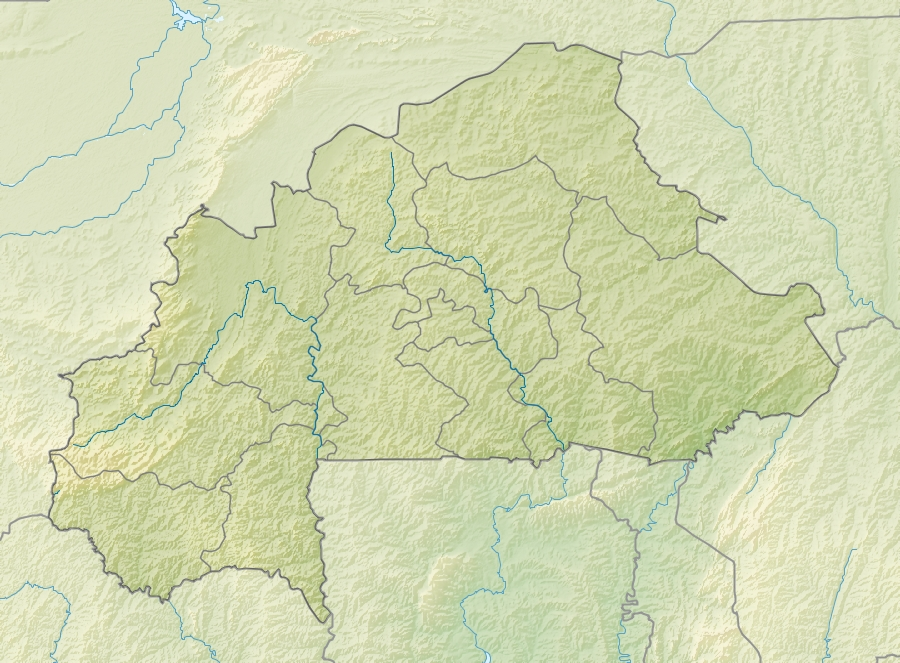
- Location in Burkina Faso
- Coordinates: 13°34′00″N 2°24′39″W
- Country: Burkina Faso
- Region: Nord Region
- Province: Yatenga Province
- Founded: 1757
- Elevation: 343 m (1,125 ft)

Population (2019 census)
  - Total: 124,587
- Time zone: UTC+00:00 (GMT)

Ouahigouya (Mossi: Wayugyã) is a city in northern Burkina Faso, situated 182 kilometres northwest of Ouagadougou. It is the capital of the Yatenga Province and one of its subdivisions the Ouahigouya Department. It is also the biggest town in the Nord Region and the fourth largest city in the country with a population of 124,587 (2019)

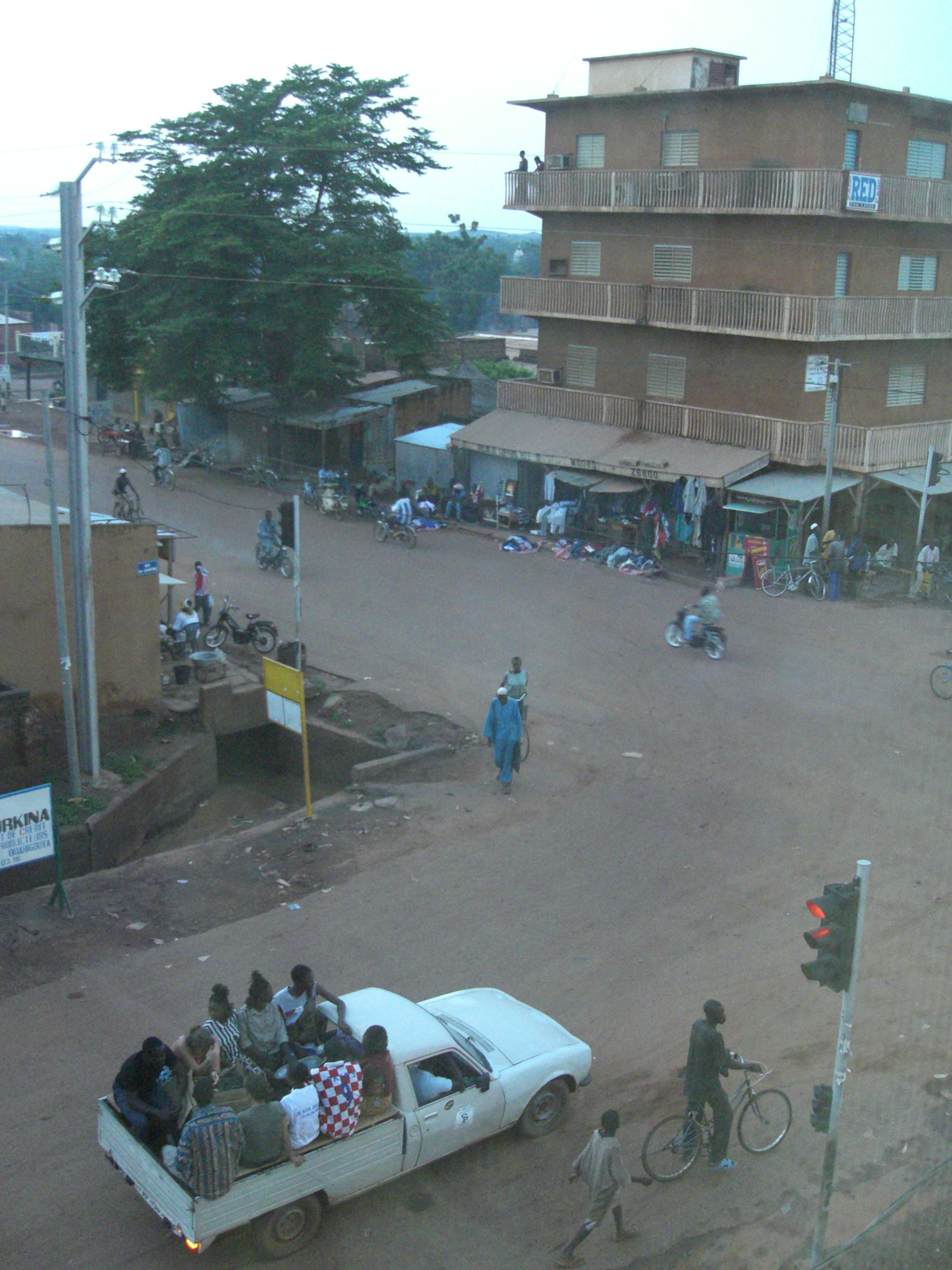
View of Ouahigouya (2005)

The city itself has a stadium, a private non-profit Paediatric Hospital with 36 beds for giving birth and 24 beds for children suffering of severe malnutrition, a post office with internet access and at least one Ecobank bank branch.

== History ==
The city was founded in 1757 as the capital of Yatenga one of a number of Mossi Kingdoms. The city still bears testimony to its role as capital of the Yatenga Kingdom in its name, the meaning of which is come and prostrate yourselves.

In the Christmas War of 1985, the city's marketplace was bombed by Malian forces, almost 100 people being killed.

== Economy ==
Mainly of an agriculturally based economy, Ouahigouya also has some commerce and craft industry. The two dams just north and west of the town permit it to pursue some vegetable planting aided by irrigation, such as tomatoes, carrots, onions and mainly potatoes. But as a whole both the region and the city are heavily dependent on rainfall and it is according to it that the population's well-being mostly depends on. Millet and sorghum though are the basis of the local diet, much like the surrounding regions.

The small craft industry here is mainly focused on leather and tanneries. The little industry in the region is mostly geared towards gold prospecting, and is carried out by a large company. In terms of commerce, the city takes advantage of its relative ease of access to the country's capital, Ouagadougou, to buy manufactured products and resell to the local economy. This is greatly facilitated by the asphalted road linking the two cities.

== Places of interest ==
Features of Ouahigouya include Naaba Kango's tomb, the Yatenga Naba's compound and an artificial lake.

== Geography ==
=== Climate ===
Classified by Köppen-Geiger system as hot semi-arid (BSh).

Climate data for Ouahigouya (1991–2020, extremes 1920–present)
Month	Jan	Feb	Mar	Apr	May	Jun	Jul	Aug	Sep	Oct	Nov	Dec	Year
Record high °C (°F)	40.0 (104.0)	42.5 (108.5)	44.3 (111.7)	45.5 (113.9)	48.8 (119.8)	48.0 (118.4)	40.8 (105.4)	38.6 (101.5)	41.3 (106.3)	41.8 (107.2)	40.6 (105.1)	43.6 (110.5)	48.8 (119.8)
Mean daily maximum °C (°F)	32.3 (90.1)	35.6 (96.1)	39.0 (102.2)	40.8 (105.4)	40.0 (104.0)	37.0 (98.6)	33.7 (92.7)	31.8 (89.2)	33.5 (92.3)	37.0 (98.6)	36.8 (98.2)	33.6 (92.5)	35.9 (96.6)
Daily mean °C (°F)	24.6 (76.3)	27.7 (81.9)	31.5 (88.7)	33.9 (93.0)	33.5 (92.3)	31.1 (88.0)	28.3 (82.9)	26.8 (80.2)	27.8 (82.0)	29.9 (85.8)	28.6 (83.5)	25.6 (78.1)	29.1 (84.4)
Mean daily minimum °C (°F)	17.7 (63.9)	20.4 (68.7)	24.4 (75.9)	27.5 (81.5)	28.0 (82.4)	26.0 (78.8)	23.9 (75.0)	23.0 (73.4)	23.4 (74.1)	24.1 (75.4)	21.3 (70.3)	18.4 (65.1)	23.2 (73.7)
Record low °C (°F)	8.5 (47.3)	11.2 (52.2)	13.1 (55.6)	13.5 (56.3)	17.0 (62.6)	15.7 (60.3)	17.9 (64.2)	18.6 (65.5)	18.1 (64.6)	16.2 (61.2)	11.2 (52.2)	10.0 (50.0)	8.5 (47.3)
Average precipitation mm (inches)	0.1 (0.00)	0.1 (0.00)	1.3 (0.05)	7.1 (0.28)	39.6 (1.56)	107.0 (4.21)	170.4 (6.71)	238.9 (9.41)	130.4 (5.13)	38.8 (1.53)	1.1 (0.04)	0.7 (0.03)	734.8 (28.93)
Average precipitation days (≥ 1.0 mm)	0.0	0.1	0.2	1.1	3.6	7.1	10.9	13.1	9.1	3.5	0.1	0.0	48.8
Average relative humidity (%)	26	22	26	35	52	64	73	80	77	62	40	29	49
Mean monthly sunshine hours	276.5	259.1	266.3	249.4	265.9	246.6	246.5	226.4	246.1	280.2	285.0	284.7	3,132.7
Source 1: World Meteorological Organization, Meteo Climat (record highs and lows)
Source 2: Deutscher Wetterdienst (humidity, 1951–1967) (Note: Station ID for Ouahigouya is 65502 Use this station ID to locate the sunshine duration)

== Sister Cities ==
Ouahigouya has one sister city:

- Decatur, United States

== See also ==
- List of cities in Burkina Faso
