= Koudougou =

City in the Centre-Ouest Region, Burkina Faso

Koudougou Kʋdgo (Mossi)
- City
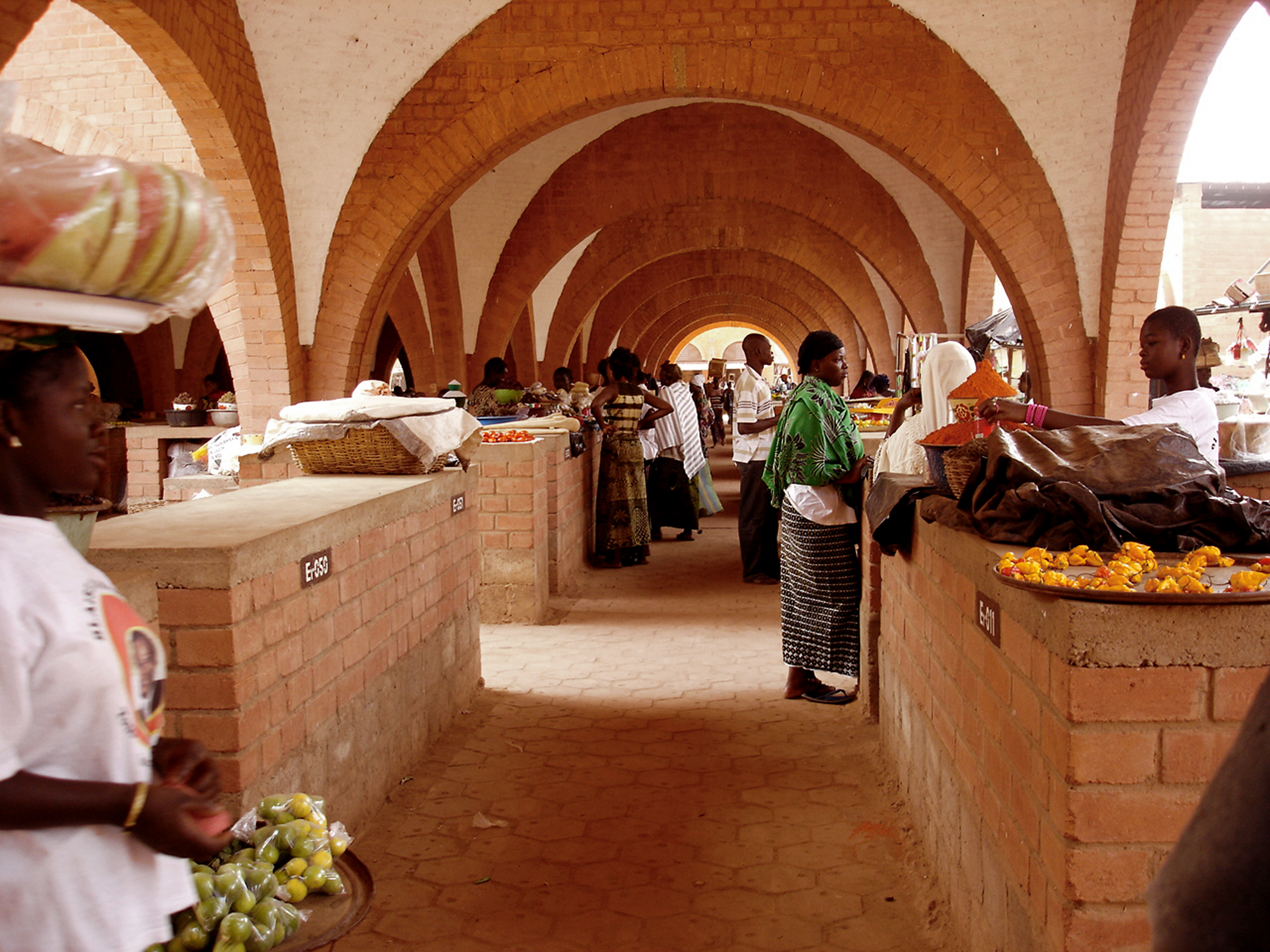
- The Grand marché (Main Market) of Koudougou

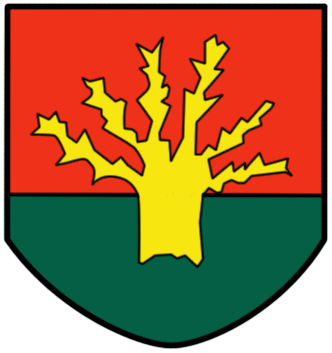
- Coat of arms

- Location within Burkina Faso, West Africa
- Coordinates: 12°15′N 2°22′W
- Country: Burkina Faso
- Region: Centre-Ouest Region
- Province: Boulkiemdé Province
- Department: Koudougou Department
- Elevation: 282 m (925 ft)

Population (2019)
  - Total: 160,239
- Time zone: UTC+0 (GMT)
- Area code: +226 50

Koudougou (Mossi: Kʋdgo) is a city in Burkina Faso's Boulkiemdé Province. It is located 75 kilometres (47 mi) west of Ouagadougou, the capital of Burkina Faso. With a population of 160,239 (2019) it is the third most populous city in Burkina Faso after Ouagadougou and Bobo Dioulasso, and is mainly inhabited by the Gurunsi and Mossi ethnic groups. Koudougou is situated on the only railway line in Burkina Faso and has some small industries, a market, a university and provincial government offices.

== Geography ==
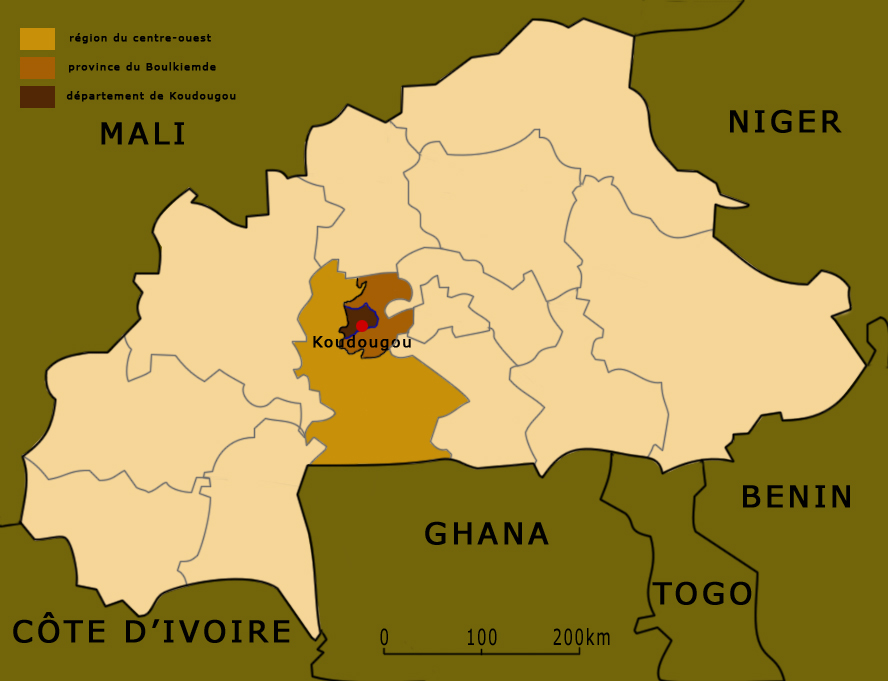
Location of Koudougou

Situated on the Mossi Plateau, the city is 75 kilometres (47 mi) west of Ouagadougou. In 1952 it was connected by rail to Ouagadougou and Abidjan. It is situated along the N13 road south of Sabou and north of Yako. The N21 road connects the city to Réo and the N14 connects it with Dédougou.

Although the city's administrative borders used to extend further, the city currently encompasses 15 surrounding villages.

== Economy ==
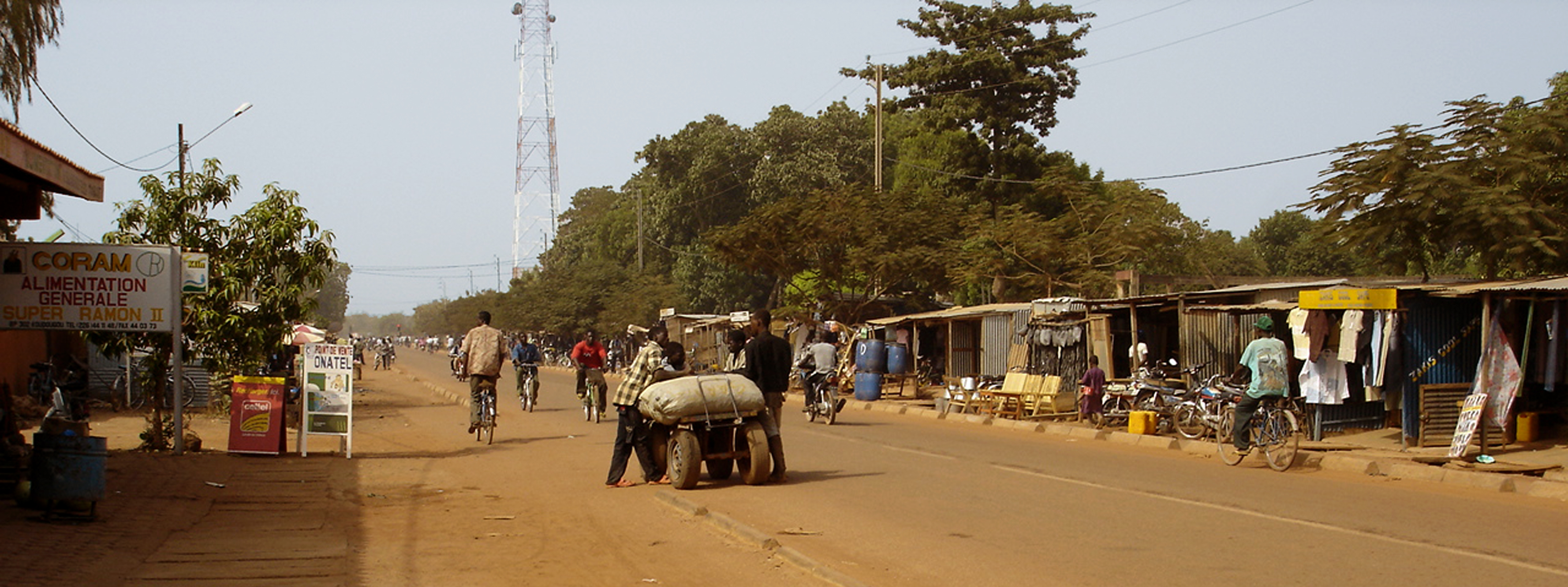
Street in Koudougou

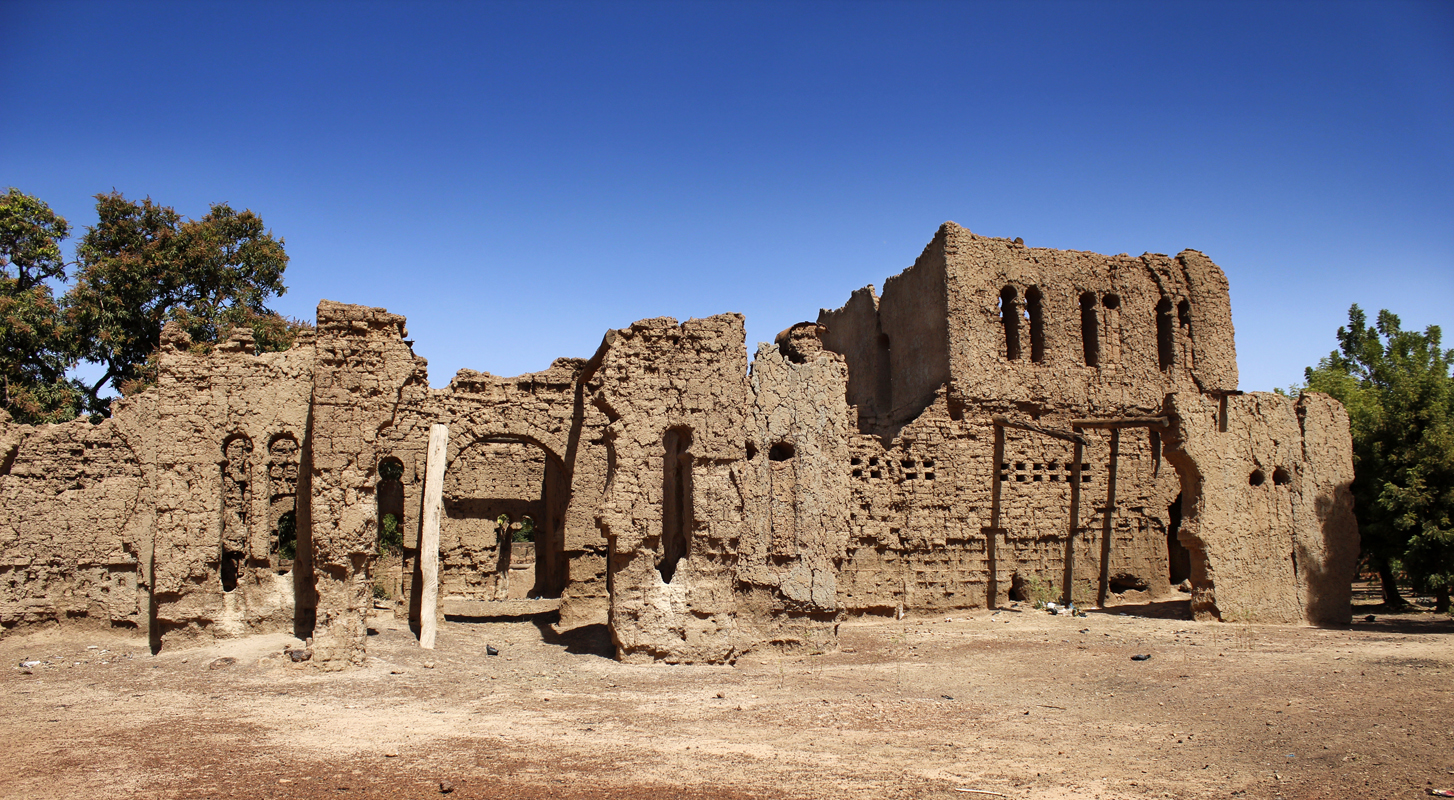
Ruins of the royal palace of the canton of Lalle

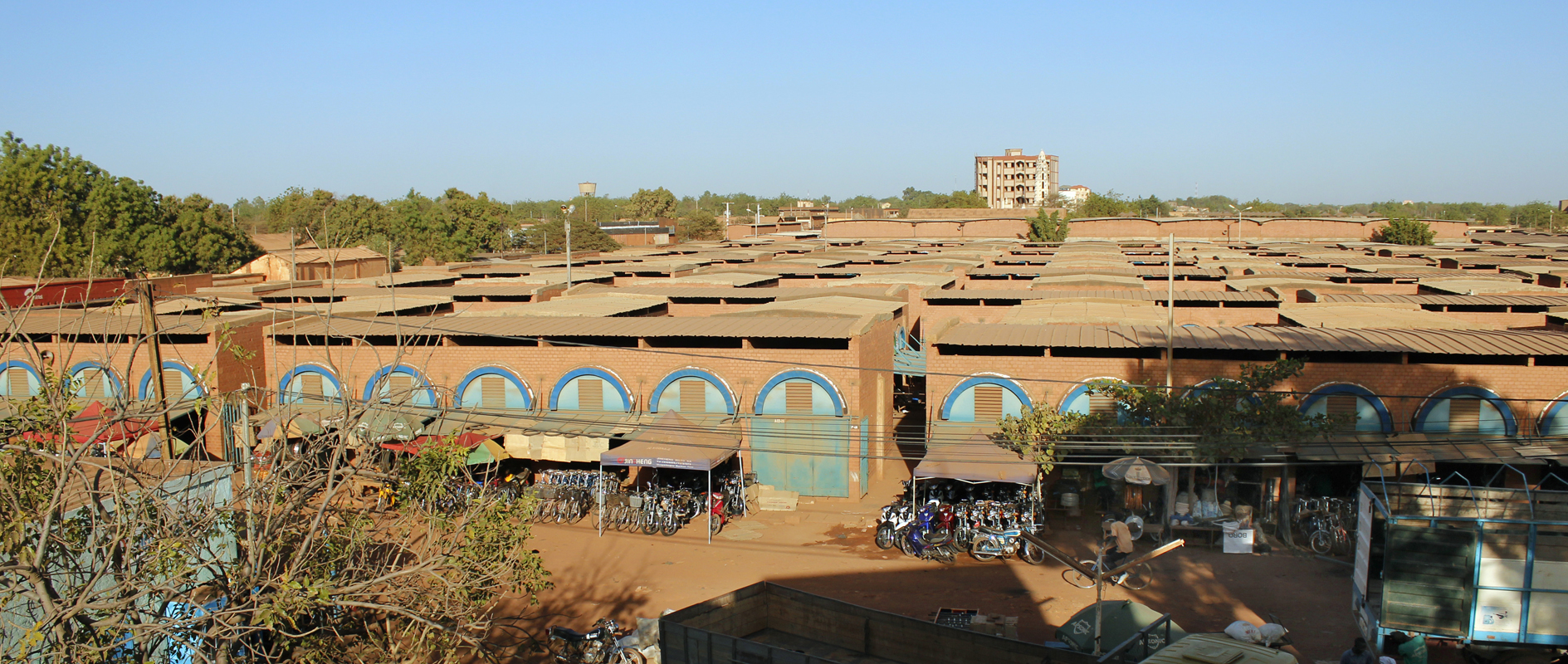
Koudougou's Market

The economy of the city is dominated by agriculture with annual GDP for the city amounting to around 17.5 billion CFA (apx. $36 million). The city has small industries such as a soap, shea butter, cotton and various textile factories. As of February 2007, the city had radio-television production and broadcasting installations for Tele-Yaka, a clothing recycling and manufacturing workshop, an experimental mango and green-leaf vegetable plantation, a metal forge for construction and maintenance of farming tools and implements, a metal waste-management and metal engineering workshop geared towards machine parts and motor components, an electronics repair shop and an open-air exhibition space for local sculptors.

Distribution of economic activities by gender
Type of Activity	Men	Women	Together
Agriculture	86,3%	89,7%	88,1%
Processing	1,1	3,7	2,5
Construction	1,2	0,0	0,6
Trade	2,7	3,1	3,0
Transportation and Telecommunications	0,4	0,1	0,2
Merchant Services	3,8	1,4	2,5
Other services	4,4	2,0	3,1

== Transportation ==
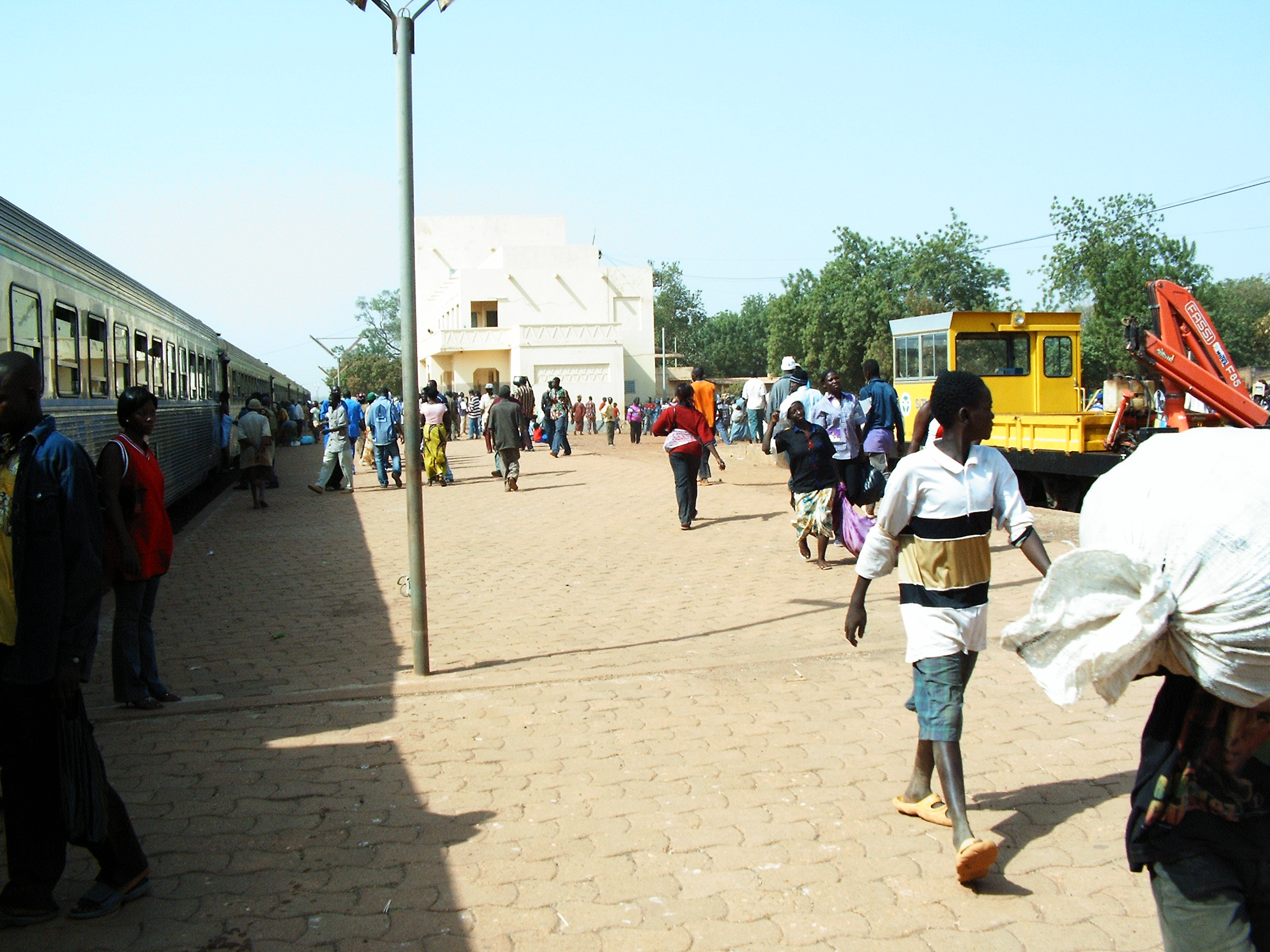
Train station in Koudougou

The city has a railroad station along the Abidjan – Ouagadougou Railway. As of June 2014 Sitarail operated a passenger train along the line three times a week in each direction. Ouagadougou International Airport is approximately 141 km southeast of central Koudougou and as of June 2014 had regularly scheduled flights to most major cities in West Africa as well as Paris, Brussels and Istanbul.

== Education ==
Since 2005 the city is home to the University of Koudougou (there were around 5,600 students enrolled in 2010/2011) and in 2012 a vocational school opened. Primary school enrollment in 2007-2008 was 79.2% and secondary school enrollment was 20.3%.

== Demographics ==
Population
Year	Pop.	±%
1985	51,926	—
2006	88,184	+69.8%
2019	160,239	+81.7%

== Sports ==
The city has a few soccer clubs including l'Association des Jeunes Sportifs de Koudougou (AJSK), l'AS des Employés de Commerce de Koudougou (ASEC-K), le Bouloumpoukou FC (BPFC), le Bouloumpoukou Stade (BPS), l'Association des jeunes footballeurs (AJF), and le Jeunesse Club Boulkiemdé. They all play at the Stade Balibiè.

== See also ==
- List of cities in Burkina Faso
- Railway stations in Burkina Faso
- Roman Catholic Diocese of Koudougou
