= Catholic Church in Burkina Faso =

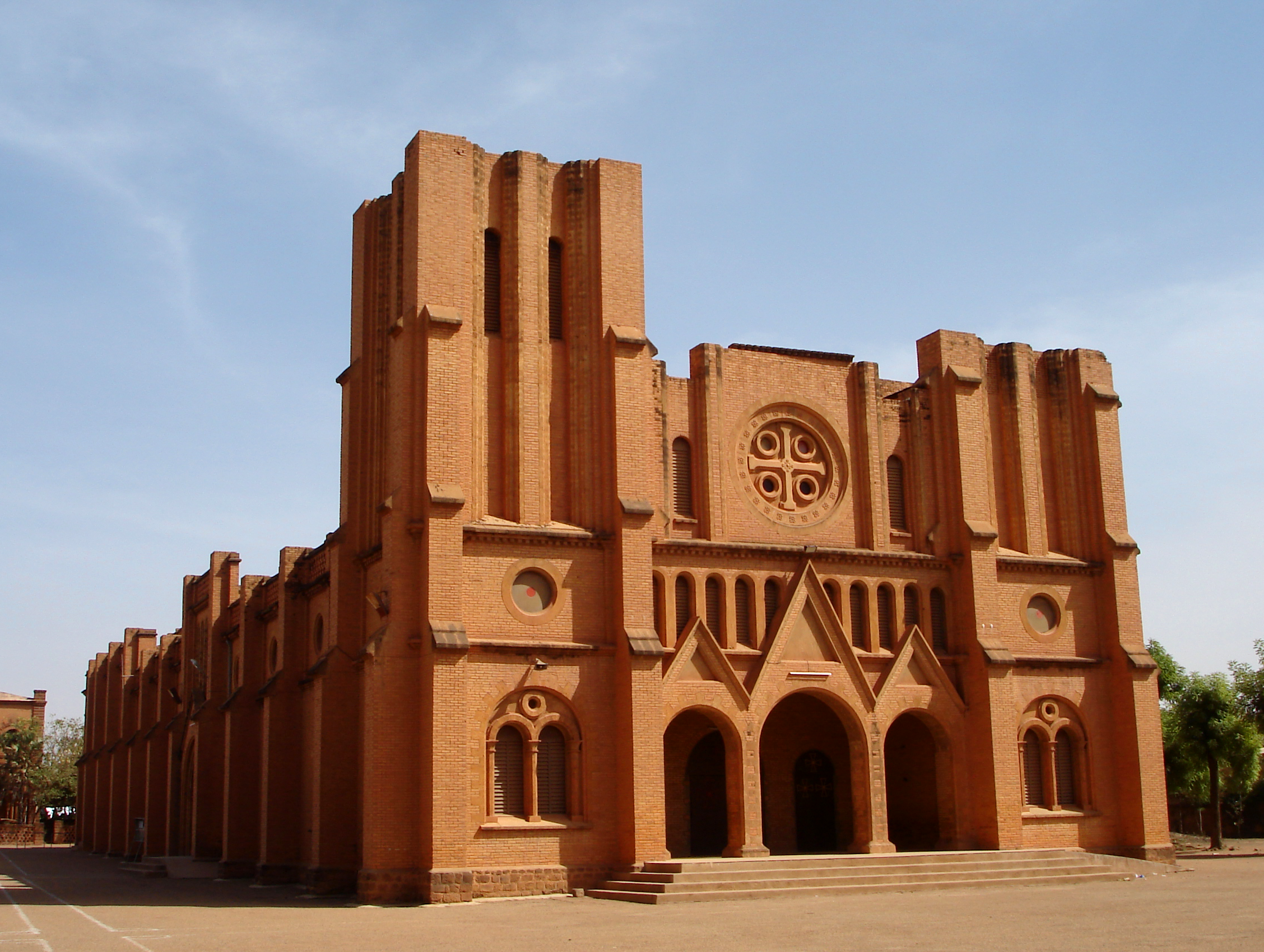
- Cathedral of Ouagadougou
- Type: National polity
- Classification: Catholic
- Orientation: Latin, Maronite
- Governance: Conférence des Evêques de Burkina Faso et du Niger
- Pope: Leo XIV
- Apostolic Nuncio: Michael Francis Crotty
- Region: Burkina Faso
- Members: ca. 3,494,000
- Official website: https://catholique.bf/

The Catholic Church in Burkina Faso is part of the worldwide Catholic Church, under the spiritual leadership of the Pope in Rome. According to the CIA Factbook, in 2018, 17% of the population are members of the Catholic Church.

== History ==
The first Catholics to enter what is today Burkina Faso arrived with the French colonialists in 1896. In 1900 and 1901 Catholic missions were established at Koupéla and Ouagadougou, respectively and Joanny Thévenoud, a missionary helped to firmly establish Catholicism in the country over the following five decades. Abbé Yougbaré was consecrated as the Bishop of Koupéla on 29 February 1956 and became the first African Catholic bishop. In 1961, upon invitation from local Catholics participating at the "International Meetings" at the monastery of Toumliline, the Benedictine established the abbey of Saint-Benoît de Koubri.

== Persecution ==
There have been several incidences of persecution against the Catholic Church in Burkina Faso over the past years. Recent cases include an attack on the minor seminary of Saint Kisito de Bougui, in February, which caused no fatalities, but much material damage. In July 2022 the diocese of Fadi N'Gourma stated that only 5% of its parishes were now accessible for pastoral work, due to the increased threat of Islamist terrorists in the region. An attack in a village in the Diocese of Nouna, also in July 2022, caused at least 22 fatalities, according to official numbers, though some witnesses spoke of up to 30 killed. In an interview with Aid to the Church in Need, in August 2022, Catholic priest Honoré Quedraogo said that the attackers "force the Burkinabé to follow Sharia. Men are forced to wear trousers of adequate length, and forbidden from shaving their beards, and women have to be veiled. Western-style education is banned, and children are made to attend Koranic schools, called Madrassas. Churches must not ring their bells, and everyone is required to participate in prayers at the mosques".

In November 2022 a Burkinabé priest, Pierre Rouamba, said that he has noticed that the attacks are increasingly being directed against Christians. In some cases, terrorists not only burn down the church building, but also destroy the crosses as a demonstration of their intention to wipe out the Christian faith. At least 15 Catholics were killed in an attack on 25 February 2024 in Essakane, in the diocese of Dori. According to bishop Justin Kientega of Ouahigouya: “There were 47 people in the Chapel for Sunday morning celebration of the Word, led by their catechist. There were 17 men and the rest were women and children. The terrorists came and killed 12 – 9 people were killed at the chapel and 3 others died from their injuries – all males, but there were also two children among the dead, a four-year-old and a 14-year-old.” In April of the same year Edouard Yougbare, a catechist from the parish of Saatenga in Fada Gourma, was abducted by terrorists and murdered.

After a few months of peace, violence returned in October 2025, according to ACN. On 6 October, in the Diocese of Nouna, three teenagers were pulled off a bus and executed by terrorists in Madouba, near the border with Mali and soon after that 15 people were killed when armed men fired on a bus and other vehicles travelling on the road from Nouna to Dédougou.

In the Diocese of Fada Ngourma a catechist was murdered in an ambush in September 2025, and another catechist was kidnapped in October, in the parish of Kouala, though later released.

During a visit to the international headquarters of pontifical charity ACN, in December 2025, bishops Justin Kientega of Ouahigouya, and Théophile Naré of Kaya, said that "if the enemy was thinking of snuffing out Christianity, it’s wasting its time: Christianity in Africa is spreading".

== Dioceses ==
- Archdiocese of Bobo-Dioulasso
  - Diocese of Banfora
  - Diocese of Dédougou
  - Diocese of Diébougou
  - Diocese of Gaoua
  - Diocese of Nouna
- Archdiocese of Koupéla
  - Diocese of Dori
  - Diocese of Fada N’Gourma
  - Diocese of Kaya
  - Diocese of Tenkodogo
- Archdiocese of Ouagadougou
  - Diocese of Koudougou
  - Diocese of Manga
  - Diocese of Ouahigouya

== See also ==
- List of cathedrals in Burkina Faso
- Religion in Burkina Faso
- Christianity in Burkina Faso
- Freedom of religion in Burkina Faso
