= Archdiocese of Ouagadougou =

Roman Catholic archdiocese in Burkina Faso

Metropolitan Archdiocese of Ouagadougou Archidioecesis Metropolitanae Uagaduguensis
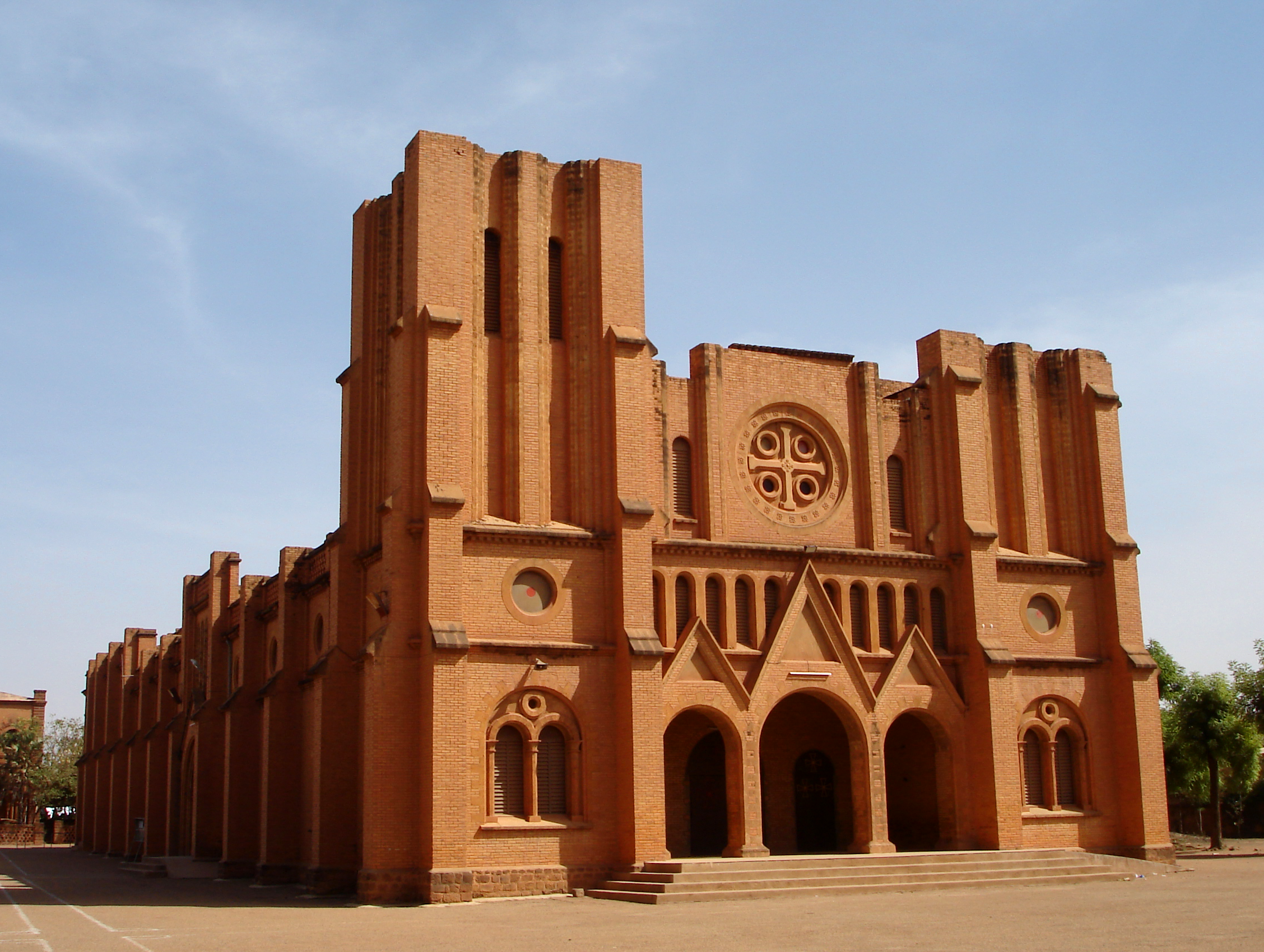
- Cathedral of Ouagadougou

Location
- Country: Burkina Faso
- Territory: Kadiogo Province
- Ecclesiastical province: Ouagadougou
- Metropolitan: Ouagadougou
- Coordinates: 12.3619°N 1.5270°W

Statistics
- Area: 9,600 km^{2} (3,700 sq mi)
- Population: Total; Catholics: (as of 2017); 2,921,460; 989,125 (33.9%)
- Parishes: 31

Information
- Denomination: Roman Catholic
- Rite: Latin Rite
- Established: 9 September 1955
- Cathedral: Cathédrale de l’Immaculée Conception, Ouagadougou
- Secular priests: 233

Current leadership
- Pope: Leo XIV
- Archbishop: Prosper Kontiebo
- Bishops emeritus: Philippe Nakellentuba Ouédraogo

The Metropolitan Archdiocese of Ouagadougou (Latin: Archidioecesis Metropolitanae Uagaduguensis) is the Metropolitan See for the ecclesiastical province of Ouagadougou in Burkina Faso.

== History ==
- 2 July 1921: Established as Apostolic Vicariate of Ouagadougou from the Apostolic Vicariate of French Sudan in Mali
- 14 September 1955: Promoted as Metropolitan Archdiocese of Ouagadougou

== Cathedral ==
The seat of the archbishop is Cathédrale de l’Immaculée Conception in Ouagadougou.

== Leadership ==
Apostolic Vicars of Ouagadougou

- Joanny Thévenoud, M.Afr (8 July 1921 – 16 September 1949)
- Emile-Joseph Socquet, M.Afr (16 September 1949 – 14 September 1955)

Archbishops of Ouagadougou

- Emile-Joseph Socquet, M.Afr (14 September 1955 – 12 January 1960)
- Paul Zoungrana, M.Afr (5 April 1960 – 10 June 1995), elevated to cardinal in 1965
- Jean-Marie Untaani Compaoré (10 June 1995 – 13 May 2009)
- Philippe Ouédraogo (13 May 2009 – 16 October 2023), elevated to cardinal in 2014
- Prosper Kontiebo (since 16 October 2023)

Coadjutor vicars apostolic

- Louis-Marie-Joseph Durrieu, M. Afr. (1946-1947), did not succeed to see; appointed Superior General of Missionaries of Africa (White Fathers)
- Emile-Joseph Socquet, M. Afr. (1948-1949)

Auxiliary bishops

- Jean-Marie Untaani Compaoré (1973-1979), appointed Bishop of Fada N’Gourma (later returned here as Archbishop)
- Jean-Baptiste Tiendrebeogo (Kiedrebeogo) (1981-1996), appointed Bishop of Kaya
- Médard Léopold Ouédraogo (28 May 2012 - 16 June 2022). Appointed bishop of Manga.

Another priest of this diocese who became bishop

- Ambroise Ouédraogo, appointed Auxiliary Bishop of Niamey, Niger in 1999

== Suffragan Dioceses ==
- Koudougou
- Manga
- Ouahigouya

== Sources ==
- GCatholic.org
