= List of Catholic dioceses in Burkina Faso and Niger =

The Roman Catholic Church in Burkina Faso is composed only of a Latin hierarchy, comprising three ecclesiastical provinces, led by Metropolitan Archbishops, which have a total of twelve suffragan dioceses.

All and only Niger is covered by the Ecclesiastical Province of Niamey, which is composed of the capital's Archdiocese of Niamey and a single suffrage diocese: the Diocese of Maradi, seated in the southern city of Maradi.

Neither has a national episcopal conference, but the two former French Sahel colonies form a joint transnational Episcopal Conference of Burkina Faso and Niger.

There are no Eastern Catholic, pre-diocesan or other exempt jurisdictions.

There are no titular sees. All defunct jurisdictions have current successor sees.

There is an Apostolic Nunciature to Burkina Faso as papal diplomatic representation (embassy level), into which the Apostolic Nunciature to Niger is also vested.

== In Burkina Faso ==
=== Ecclesiastical Province of Bobo-Dioulasso ===
- Metropolitan Archdiocese of Bobo-Dioulasso
  - Diocese of Banfora
  - Diocese of Dédougou
  - Diocese of Diébougou
  - Diocese of Nouna
  - Diocese of Gaoua

=== Ecclesiastical Province of Koupéla ===
- Metropolitan Archdiocese of Koupéla
  - Diocese of Dori
  - Diocese of Fada N’Gourma
  - Diocese of Kaya
  - Diocese of Tenkodogo

=== Ecclesiastical Province of Ouagadougou ===
- Metropolitan Archdiocese of Ouagadougou
  - Diocese of Koudougou
  - Diocese of Manga
  - Diocese of Ouahigouya.

== In Niger ==
=== Ecclesiastical Province of Niamey ===
- Metropolitan Archdiocese of Niamey
  - Diocese of Maradi.

== See also ==
- List of Catholic dioceses (structured view)

== Sources and external links ==
- GCatholic.org Burkina Faso - data for all sections.
- GCatholic.org Niger - data for all sections.
- Catholic-Hierarchy entry.
