= Caritas Burkina Faso =

Catholic charity organisation in Burkina Faso

- Organisation Catholique pour le Développement et la Solidarité (OCADES)
- Established: 1956
- Type: Nonprofit
- Registration no.: 98-181/MAT/SG/DGAT/DLPAJ
- Legal status: Association à but non-lucratif ("non-profit association")
- Location: Ouagadougou, Burkina Faso
- Coordinates: 12.35914°N 1.49201°W
- Origins: Catholic Social Teaching
- Region served: Burkina Faso
- Fields: development aid, humanitarian aid, education, health, peacebuilding, agriculture
- Affiliations: Caritas Internationalis, Caritas Africa
- Expenses: XOF 9,549,596,130 (2018)
- Website: ocadesburkina.org

Caritas Burkina Faso, locally known as Organisation catholique pour le développement et la solidarité ("Catholic Organisation for Development and Solidarity", OCADES) and Ocades Caritas Burkina, is a nonprofit organisation in the Burkina Faso. It is the official aid organisation of the Burkinabè Catholic Church with a presence all over the country.

It is a member of the global Caritas Internationalis confederation and of the regional Caritas Africa.

== History ==
The origin of the organisation dates back to 1956, when the French Secours catholique established a delegation in what was then French Upper Volta. After the independence of the Republic of Upper Volta, this delegation took the name of Caritas voltaïque in 1961.

A separate structure, the Bureau d'étude et de liaison ("Research and Liaison Office", BEL) was founded in 1973. In 1998, at the initiative of the Bishops Conference, the current structure was established by mergeing the BEL and Caritas. It was officially recognised as non-profit association by the State on 25 May 1998.

== Structure ==
Caritas Burkina Faso is the national Caritas organisation and federates its 15 diocesan Caritas organisations with their 200 Caritas parish branches. The diocesan bodies and the General Secretariat of Caritas Burkina Faso operate independently and function through delegation, in accordance with the principle of subsidiarity.

The diocesan Caritas organisations are called Secrétariats exécutifs diocésains or SED ("Diocesan Executive Secretariats"). These are:

- SED Banfora
- SED Bobo Dioulasso
- SED Dédougou
- SED Diébougou
- SED Dori
- SED Fada NGourma
- SED Gaoua
- SED Kaya
- SED Koudougou
- SED Koupela
- SED Manga
- SED Nouna
- SED Ouagadougou
- SED Ouahigouya
- SED Tenkodogo

== Work ==
Caritas Burkina implements programmes to alleviate poverty and support the most vulnerable persons in the country. Its initiatives span across multiple sectors such as agriculture, emergency assistance and humanitarian aid, access to essential social services, microfinance, reintegration and rehabilitation of vulnerable individuals, food security, and promoting women's rights in a Sahelian environment challenged by extreme variability and climate change.

Despite its Catholic affiliation, Caritas Burkina Faso serves all communities indiscriminately, irrespective of gender, religion, or ethnicity.

In 2018, its services reached 1,5 million direct beneficiaries. The total budget for the organisations programmes has increased over the years, from 5 billion West African CFA francs in 2009, to 7 billion francs in 2015 and 9.5 billion francs in 2018.
