= List of Burkinabe writers =

This is a list of Burkinabé writers.

- François Djobi Bassolet (1933–2001), journalist, historian, and cultural leader
- Angèle Bassolé-Ouédraogo (born 1967), French-language poet, Ivorian-Canadian journalist and poet raised in Burkina Faso
- Jacques Prosper Bazié (born 1955), poet^{[Gikandi]}
- Nazi Boni (1909–1969), politician and writer^{[Gikandi]}
- Sarah Bouyain (born 1968), French-Burkinabé writer and film director
- Simporé Simone Compaore (b. c. 1956), French-language playwright
- Augustin-Sondé Coulibaly (1933–2017), French-language novelist, poet and critic
- Bernadette Sanou Dao (born 1952), politician, poet and children's writer
- D. Jean Pierre Guingané (1947–2011), playwright, actor and director^{[Gikandi]}
- Frédéric Guirma (1931–2024), writer and politician
- Zarra Guiro (born 1957), French-language autobiographical writer
- Ignace Ansomwin Hien (born 1952), novelist, poet and storywriter^{[Gikandi]}
- Monique Ilboudo (born 1959), politician and writer^{[Gikandi]}
- Pierre Claver Ilboudo (born 1948), French-language novelist
- Sophie Heidi Kam (born 1968), French-language poet, playwright and novelist
- Sandra Pierrette Kanzié, French-language poet
- Joseph Ki-Zerbo (1922–2006), politician, historian, writer and activist
- Amadou Koné (born 1953), novelist, playwright and short story writer^{[Gikandi]}
- Gaël Koné (born 1976), French-language poet
- Honorine Mare (born 1972), French-language poet and academic
- Roger Nikiéma (c. 1935–2021), French-language journalist, novelist and poet
- Suzy Henrique Nikiéma (born 1983), French-language novelist
- Kollin Noaga, pseudonym of Ernest Nongma Ouedraogo, politician, novelist and playwright
- Malika Ouattara (born 1993), slam poet
- Dim-Dolobsom Ouedraogo (1897–1940), intellectual
- Titinga Frédéric Pacéré (1943–2024), griot, historian, museum curator and French-language writer^{[Gikandi]}
- Bernadette Sanou Dao (born 1952), author and poet
- Adiza Sanoussi, French-language novelist
- Etienne Sawadogo, French-language novelist
- Marie-Simone Séri (born 1954), French-language autobiographical writer also connected with Côte d'Ivoire
- Jean-Baptiste Somé, novelist
- Malidoma Patrice Somé (1956–2021), writer about religion, died in Oregon, United States
- Maxime Z. Somé (born 1959), academic, politician and novelist
- Norbert Zongo (1949–1998), assassinated newspaper publisher, editor, journalist and novelist^{[Gikandi]}

== See also ==
- Burkinabé literature
