= Burkinabe literature =

Burkinabé literature grew out of oral tradition, which remains important. In 1934, during French occupation, Dim-Dolobsom Ouedraogo published his Maximes, pensées et devinettes mossi (Maxims, Thoughts and Riddles of the Mossi), a record of the oral history of the Mossi people. The oral tradition continued to have an influence on Burkinabé writers in the post-independence Burkina Faso of the 1960s, such as Nazi Boni and Roger Nikiema. The 1960s saw a growth in the number of playwrights being published. Since the 1970s, literature has developed in Burkina Faso with many more writers being published.

== Early literature and colonial times ==
Prior to colonisation, written literature was virtually absent in Burkina Faso, like much of Africa. The oral tradition has always been important to the many ethnic groups, sustaining the cultural diversity of the country. Culture has been transmitted orally through music and dance. This has been described by Titinga Frédéric Pacéré in his 1992 book Le langage des tam-tams et des masques Afrique, emphasising the importance in many of Burkina Faso's ethnic groups of griots, and the older members of the communities.

In 1934, Dim-Dolobsom Ouedraogo wrote his book Maximes, pensées et devinettes mossi (Maximes, Thoughts and Riddles of the Mossi), recording the oral history of the Mossi kingdom which gave rise to Burkina Faso.

== Post-independence ==
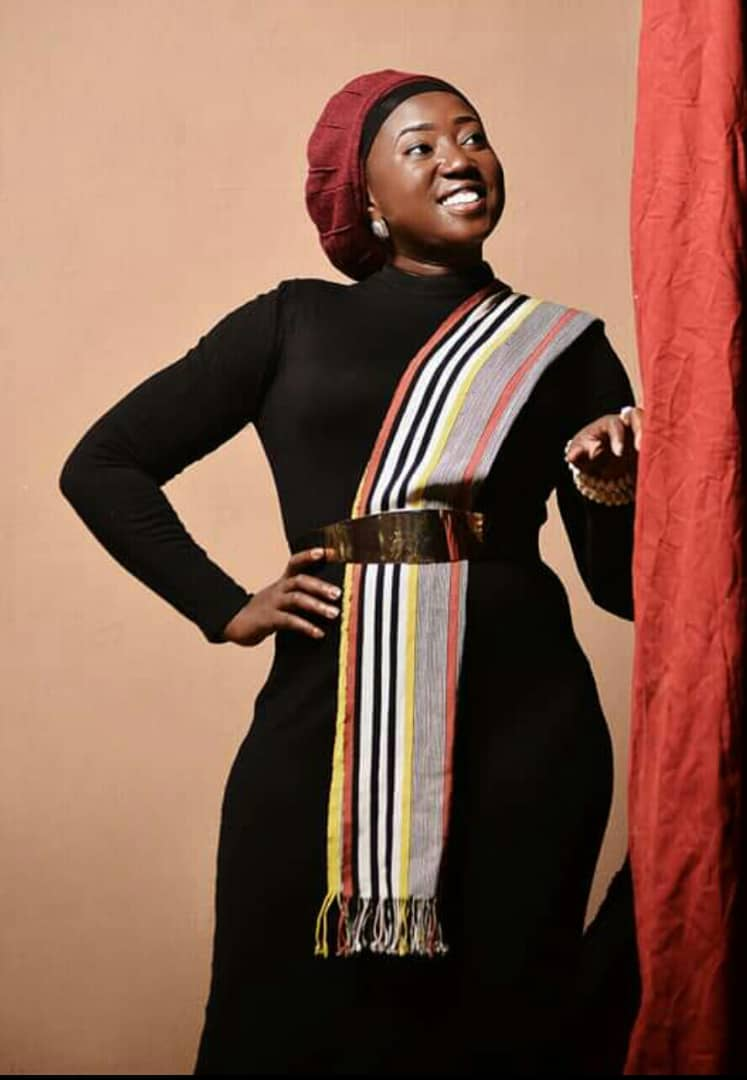
Malika Ouattara

The first novel by a Burkinabé writer was Crépuscule des temps anciens (The Dawn of Ancient Times or The Twilight of the Bygone Days) by Nazi Boni, published in 1962. Boni was an important political figure in his country's independence and political issues informed his writing. His novel explores the traditions of the Bwamu people and has been called an "ethnographic novel". The second Burkinabé novel was Roger Nikiema's 1967 book Dessein contraire.

During the 1960s, there was also a proliferation of theatre works. Playwrights that became prominent in this time included Ouamdégré Ouedraogo with L'avare Moaga: comédie des moeurs (Miser Moaga: a Comedy of Manners), Pierre Dabiré with Sansoa and Moussa Savadogo with Fille de le Volta (Daughter of the Volta) and L'oracle (The Oracle).

In the 1970s, the next generation of Burkinabé novelists included Augustin-Sondé Coulibaly, Kollin Noaga and Etienne Sawadogo. More recent writers include Jacques Prosper Bazié, Ansomwin Ignace Hien, Jean-Baptiste Somé, Pierre Claver Ilboudo and Norbert Zongo. From the 1980s, women writers in Burkina Faso began to be published including Sandra Pierrette Kanzié, Bernadette Dao, Angèle Bassolé-Ouédraogo, Gaël Koné, Monique Ilboudo, Suzy Henrique Nikiéma, Sarah Bouyain and Adiza Sanoussi. A particularly noted writer has been Frédéric Pacéré Titinga.

In the twenty-first century, slam poetry has increased in popularity, in part due to the work of Malika Ouattara.

== See also ==
- Francophone literature
- List of Burkinabé writers
