= List of Burkinabé women writers =

This is a list of women writers who were born in Burkina Faso or whose writings are closely associated with that country.

- Angèle Bassolé-Ouédraogo (born 1967), French-language poet, Ivorian-Canadian journalist and poet raised in Burkina Faso
- Sarah Bouyain (born 1968), French-Burkinabé writer and film director
- Monique Ilboudo (born 1959), author and human rights activist
- Pauline Mvele (born 1969), actress, director and screenwriter
- Roukiata Ouedraogo (born 1979), playwright and actress
- Bernadette Sanou Dao (born 1952), author and politician
- Adiza Sanoussi, nom de plume of the novelist Alizata Sana
- Sobonfu Somé (died 2017), teacher and writer

== See also ==
- List of women writers
- List of Burkinabé writers
