= Joseph Sama =

Burkinabe Roman Catholic prelate (born 1947)

The Most Reverend Joseph Sama
- Bishop Emeritus of Nouna, Burkina Faso
- Church: Catholic Church
- Archdiocese: Roman Catholic Archdiocese of Bobo-Dioulasso
- See: Nouna
- Appointed: 14 April 2000
- Installed: 28 October 2000
- Term ended: 25 January 2025
- Predecessor: Zéphyrin Toé
- Successor: Guy Mukasa Sanon

Orders
- Ordination: 12 July 1975
- Consecration: 28 October 2000 by Zéphyrin Toé
- Rank: Bishop

Personal details
- Born: Joseph Sama; 12 October 1947 (age 78) Dédougou, Apostolic Prefecture of Nouna, Burkina Faso
- Motto: "I am among you as one who serves"

Styles of Joseph Sama
- Reference style: Your Lordship; The Most Reverend
- Spoken style: His Lordship
- Religious style: Bishop

Joseph Sama (born 12 October 1947) is a Burkinabe Catholic prelate who was the Bishop of the Roman Catholic Diocese of Nouna, Burkina Faso from 14 April 2000 until his retirement on 25 January 2025. Before that, from 12 July 1975 until 14 April 2000, he was a priest of the Catholic Diocese of Nouna. He was appointed bishop on 14 April 2000 by Pope John Paul II and was consecrated and installed at Nouna on 28 October 2000. Following his retirement, he became the Bishop Emeritus of Nouna.

== Background and education ==
He was born on 12 October 1947, in Dédougou, Apostolic Prefecture of Nouna, Burkina Faso. He studied philosophy and theology at seminary before being ordained a priest on 12 July 1975.

== Priesthood ==
On 12 July 1975 he was ordained a priest of the Roman Catholic Diocese of Nouna-Dédougou, Burkina Faso. He served in that capacity until 14 April 2000.

== As bishop ==
Pope John Paul II appointed him as Bishop of the Roman Catholic Diocese of Nouna on 14 Apr 2000. He was consecrated and installed at Nouna on 28 October 2000 by Bishop Zéphyrin Toé, Bishop of Dédougou, assisted by Archbishop Jean-Marie Untaani Compaoré, Archbishop of Ouagadougou, and Bishop Jean-Gabriel Diarra, Bishop of San. He has been active in helping school children who have been brutalized by religious zealots. "Supported by the Pontifical Mission Societies, the diocese offers education, faith, and community to help them rebuild their lives amidst hardship".

On 25 January 2025, Pope Francis "accepted the resignation from the pastoral care of the diocese of Nouna, Burkina Faso, presented by Bishop Joseph Sama". The Holy Father appointed Guy Mukasa Sanon, of the clergy of Bobo-Dioulasso, as the new bishop of Nouna Catholic Diocese.

== See also ==
- Catholic Church in Burkina Faso

== Succession table ==
Catholic Church titles
Preceded by None (Diocese erected)	Bishop of Nouna (14 April 2000 - 25 January 2025)	Succeeded by Guy Mukasa Sanon (since 25 January 2025)
