= Ambroise Ouédraogo =

Bishop of the Catholic Diocese of Maradi in Niger

- Bishop of Maradi
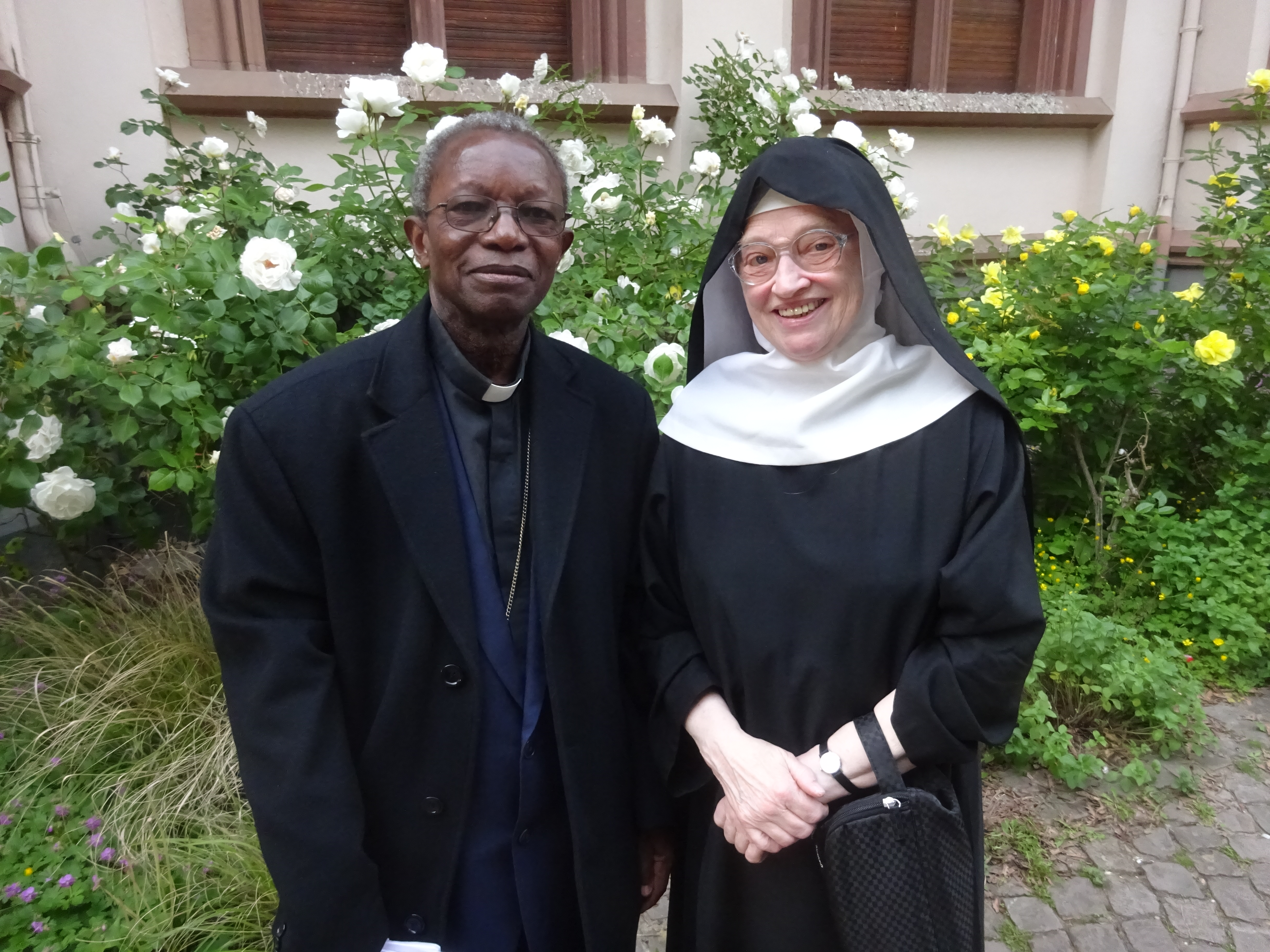
- Ambroise Ouédraogo (left) in Wiesbaden with Sr. Emanuela (Eibingen Abbey).
- Church: Roman Catholic Church
- Diocese: Maradi
- See: Maradi
- Appointed: 13 March 2001
- Previous posts: Titular Bishop of Severiana (1999-2001); Auxiliary Bishop of Niamey (1999-2001)

Orders
- Ordination: 29 June 1979
- Consecration: 26 September 1999 by Francis Arinze

Personal details
- Born: Ambroise Ouédraogo; 15 December 1948 (age 77) Ouagadougou, Burkina Faso
- Education: Institut Catholique de Paris
- Motto: Tout est Grâce

Ambroise Ouédraogo (born 15 December 1948) is the bishop of the Catholic Diocese of Maradi in Niger. He was appointed in 2001 as the first bishop of this new diocese, one of two dioceses in Niger. He has organised a structure of administration and ministry, with a focus on dialogue with the Islamic majority in the area which has less than 1% Christians.

== Life ==
Ouédraogo was born at Ouagadougou, Burkina Faso, on 15 December 1948. He was ordained as a priest on 30 June 1979. The same year, he was vicar in the parish Sacré Cœur de Dapoya. In 1982, he was appointed military priest of Burkina Faso. In December 1985, he was sent to Niamey in Niger as a priest of Fidei donum. He was parish priest of the congregation Saint Paul de Harobanda there from 1986, from 1987 priest for the youth of Niamey, and from 1989 priest at Niamey Cathedral until 1999. He interrupted his work there from 1992 to 1993 for a residency at the Institut Catholique de Paris.

Ouédraogos was ordained as auxiliary bishop of the Archdiocese of Niamey and as titular bishop of Severiana on 18 May 1999. He was consecrated as a bishop on 26 September that year by Cardinal Francis Arinze, with co-consecrators Jean-Marie Untaani Compaoré, archbishop of Ouagadougou, and Guy Armand Romano CSsR, bishop of Niamey.

He became bishop of the new Diocese of Maradi on 13 March 2001. He chose the motto "Everything is grace". In the diocese, he created new structures of administration and ministry, for its area which is twice as large as Germany. He focused on a dialogue with Islam in a region where less than 1% of the population are Christians, in a context where the peaceful relationship were interrupted in January 2015 by violence against Christian locations in Niamey and Maradi, following the terrorist attack on Charlie Hebdo in Paris. More than 70 churches were attacked. The bishop has travelled to Europe, especially to Germany where groups including Missio and Caritas support projects in his diocese, to raise awareness of the situation in his diocese.
