= Ollo Modeste Kambou =

Burkinabe Catholic prelate (born 1963)

The Most Reverend Ollo Modeste Kambou
- Bishop of Gaoua, Burkina Faso
- Church: Catholic Church
- Archdiocese: Roman Catholic Archdiocese of Bobo-Dioulasso
- See: Roman Catholic Diocese of Gaoua
- Appointed: 30 November 2011
- Installed: 18 February 2012
- Predecessor: None (Diocese created)
- Successor: Incumbent

Orders
- Ordination: 28 December 1991
- Consecration: 18 February 2012 by Vito Rallo
- Rank: Bishop

Personal details
- Born: Ollo Modeste Kambou; 4 December 1963 (age 62) Bouti, Sud-Ouest Region, Burkina Faso
- Motto: "Sursum Corda" (Lift up your hearts)

Styles of Ollo Modeste Kambou
- Reference style: Your Lordship; The Most Reverend
- Spoken style: His Lordship
- Religious style: Bishop

Ollo Modeste Kambou (born 4 December 1963) is a Burkinabe Catholic prelate who is the bishop of the Roman Catholic Diocese of Gaoua in Burkina Faso since 30 November 2011. Before that, from 28 December 1991 until 30 November 2011, he was a priest of the Roman Catholic Diocese of Diébougou in the Metropolitan Province of Bobo-Dioulasso. He was appointed bishop on 30 November 2011 by Pope Benedict XVI, the same day The Holy Father created the diocese of Diébougou, a suffragan of Bobo-Dioulasso. He was ordained and installed at Gaoua, Burkina Faso, on 18 February 2012 by Archbishop Vito Rallo, Titular Archbishop of Alba.

== Background, education and priesthood ==
He was born on 4 December 1963 in Bouti, in the Roman Catholic Diocese of Diébougou, in Burkina Faso. He studied both philosophy and theology at seminary, in Burkina Faso. He was ordained priest of his home diocese on 28 December 1991. He served as a priest until 30 November 2011. He studied at the State University of Ouagadougou from 1995 until 1999, graduating with a Bachelor of Arts degree in modern literature.

While a priest, he served in various roles including as:

- Professor at the Saint Tarcisius minor seminary in Kakapèlè, from 1992 until 1995.
- Vicar of the parish of Nako from 1999 until 2000.
- Professor at the minor seminary of Saint Tarcisius in Kakapèlè in 2000.
- Director of Saint Tarcisius Minor Seminary in Kakapèlè from 2001 until 2007.
- Vicar General of the Catholic Diocese of Diébougou from 2007 until 2011.

== As bishop ==
On 30 November 2011, Pope Benedict XVI appointed Father Ollo Modeste Kambou, as bishop of the newly created Roman Catholic Diocese of Gaoua. He was consecrated and installed at Gaoua, Burkina, Faso on 18 February 2012 by Archbishop Vito Rallo, Titular Archbishop of Alba assisted by Archbishop Paul Yemboaro Ouédraogo, Archbishop of Bobo-Dioulasso and Bishop Dèr Raphaël Kusiélé Dabiré, Bishop of Diébougou.

== See also ==
- Catholic Church in Burkina Faso

== Succession table ==
Catholic Church titles
Preceded by Vacant (Diocese created)	Bishop of Gaoua (since 30 November 2011)	Succeeded by Incumbent
