= Prosper Bonaventure Ky =

Burkinabe Catholic prelate (born in 1965)

The Most Reverend Prosper Bonaventure Ky
- Bishop of Dédougou, Burkina Faso
- Church: Catholic Church
- Archdiocese: Roman Catholic Archdiocese of Bobo-Dioulasso
- See: Roman Catholic Diocese of Dédougou
- Appointed: 24 April 2018
- Installed: 21 July 2018
- Predecessor: Judes Bicaba
- Successor: Incumbent

Orders
- Ordination: 23 July 1994
- Consecration: 21 July 2018 by Cardinal Philippe Nakellentuba Ouédraogo
- Rank: Bishop

Personal details
- Born: Prosper Bonaventure Ky; 10 January 1965 (age 61) Toma, Diocese of Nouna, Burkina Faso

Styles of Prosper Bonaventure Ky
- Reference style: Your Lordship; The Most Reverend
- Spoken style: His Lordship
- Religious style: Bishop

Prosper Bonaventure Ky (born 10 January 1965) is a Burkinabe Catholic prelate who has served as Bishop of the Roman Catholic Diocese of Dédougou, Burkina Faso, since 24 April 2018. Before that, from 23 July 1994 until 24 April 2018, he was a priest of the Roman Catholic Diocese of Nouna-Dédougou, Burkina Faso. He was appointed bishop on 24 April 2018 by Pope Francis. He was consecrated and installed at Dédougou, on 21 July 2018 by Cardinal Philippe Nakellentuba Ouédraogo, Archbishop of Ouagadougou.

== Background and education ==
He was born on 10 January 1965 in Toma, in the diocese of Dédougou, Burkina Faso. He studied philosophy at the Major Seminary of Saint-Jean-Baptiste in Wayalgê, Ouagadougou. He then studied theology at the Major Seminary of Saint-Pierre Claver in Koumi, Bobo-Dioulasso. He also holds a doctorate in psychology awarded by the Pontifical Salesian University in Rome, Italy, where he studied from 2003 until 2010.

== Priest ==
He was ordained a priest on 23 July 1994 and served in this ministry until 24 April 2018.

While a priest, he served in many roles including as:

- Professor at the minor seminary of Naxos in Bobo-Dioulasso from 1994 until 1998.
- Parochial vicar of the cathedral of Dédougou from 1999 until 2000.
- Lecturer and director at the minor seminary of Tionkuy, Dédougou Diocese from 2000 until 2003.
- Parish vicar of Toma, Diocese of Nouna, from 2010 until 2012.

== As bishop ==
On 24 April 2018, Pope Francis appointed him as bishop of the Roman Catholic Diocese of Dédougou. He was consecrated and installed at Dédougou, Burkina Faso on 21 July 2018 by Cardinal Philippe Nakellentuba Ouédraogo, Archbishop of Ouagadougou, assisted by Archbishop Paul Yemboaro Ouédraogo, Archbishop of Bobo-Dioulasso and Bishop Jean-Gabriel Diarra, Bishop of San.

== See also ==
- Catholic Church in Burkina Faso

== Succession table ==
Catholic Church titles
| Preceded by Judes Bicaba (4 June 2005 - 19 August 2016) | Bishop of Dédougou (since 24 April 2018) | Succeeded by Incumbent |
