= Guy Mukasa Sanon =

Burkinabe Roman Catholic prelate (born 1968)

The Most Reverend Guy Mukasa Sanon
- Bishop of Nouna, Burkina Faso
- Church: Catholic Church
- Archdiocese: Roman Catholic Archdiocese of Bobo-Dioulasso
- See: Nouna
- Appointed: 25 January 2025
- Installed: 3 May 2025
- Predecessor: Joseph Sama
- Successor: Incumbent

Orders
- Ordination: 14 July 1996
- Consecration: 3 May 2025
- Rank: Bishop

Personal details
- Born: Guy Mukasa Sanon; 14 September 1968 (age 58) Toussiana, Hauts-Bassins, Archdiosece of Bobo-Dioulasso, Burkina Faso

Styles of Guy Mukasa Sanon
- Reference style: Your Lordship; The Most Reverend
- Spoken style: His Lordship
- Religious style: Bishop

Guy Mukasa Sanon (born 14 September 1968) is a Burkinabe Catholic prelate who is the Bishop of the Roman Catholic Diocese of Nouna, Burkina Faso since 25 January 2025. Before that, from 14 July 1996 until 25 January 2025, he was a priest of the Roman Catholic Archdiocese of Bobo-Dioulasso, in Burkina Faso. He was appointed bishop on 25 January 2025 by Pope Francis. He was consecrated at Nouna on 3 May 2025. His installation took place on 11 May 2025.

== Background and education ==
He was born on 14 September 1968 at Toussiana, Hauts-Bassins, Archdiocese of Bobo-Dioulasso, Burkina Faso. He attended Toussiana Mixed Primary School from 1974 until 1981. He then entered the Immaculate Conception of Nasso Minor Youth Seminary near Bobo-Dioulasso, where he studied from 1981 until 1989. Fron 1989 until 1991 he studied Philosophy at Saint Jean-Baptiste Major Seminary of Wayalgê, in Ouagadougou. He transferred to the Saint Pierre-Claver Major Seminary of Koumi in Bobo-Dioulasso, where he studied Theology from 1991 until 1993.

He took one year of Pastoral Internship at the Cathedral of Our Lady of Lourdes in Bobo-Dioulasso from 1993 until 1994. He continued with theological studies at the Saint Pierre-Claver Major Seminary of Koumi near Bobo-Dioulasso, studying there from 1994 util 1996. He graduated with a Bachelor of Philosophy degree in 2001 from the Catholic University of Abidjan, having studied there from 1998. He also holds a Doctorate in Philosophy awarded by the Catholic University of Louvain-la-Neuve in Belgium, where he studied from 2005 until 2010. He was ordained a priest on 14 July 1996.

== Priesthood ==
On 14 July 1996 he was ordained a priest of the Archdiocese of Bobo-Dioulasso, Burkina Faso. He served in that capacity until 25 Jan 2025.

While a priest, he served in various roles and locations including:

- Vicar in the Parish of Saint Vincent de Paul de Koko in Bobo-Dioulasso from 1996 until 1998.
- Formator and Director of Studies at the Minor Seminary of Nasso in Bobo-Dioulasso from 2001 until 2005.
- Vicar at the Cathedral of Our Lady of Lourdes, Bobo-Dioulasso from 2010 until 2011.
- Parish priest of Notre Dame de Lourdes Cathedral Parish, Bobo-Dioulasso from 2011 until 2016.
- Visiting Professor, Saint Pierre and Saint Paul de Kossoghin Major Seminary in Ouagadougou from 2011 util 2016.
- Permanent Formator and Professor of Philosophy, Saint Peter and Saint Paul Major Seminary of Kossoghin in Ouagadougou from 2016 until 2019.
- Rector of the Saint Pierre and Saint Paul de Kossoghin Major Seminary in Ouagadougou from 2019 until 2025.

== As bishop ==
Pope Francis appointed him as Bishop of the Roman Catholic Diocese of Nouna, on 25 January 2025. He succeeded Bishop Joseph Sama whose age-related retirement was accepted by The Holy Father on 25 January 2025. He was consecrated at Nouna on 3 May 2025 by the hands of Bishop Joseph Sama, Bishop Emeritus of Nouna assisted by Bishop Pierre Claver Malgo, Bishop of Fada N'Gourma and Archbishop Laurent Birfuoré Dabiré, Archbishop of Bobo-Dioulasso. Bishop Guy Mukasa Sanon was installed at Nouna on 11 May 2025.

== See also ==
- Catholic Church in Burkina Faso

== Succession table ==
Catholic Church titles
Preceded by Joseph Sama (14 April 2000 - 25 January 2025)	Bishop of Nouna (since 25 January 2025)	Succeeded by Incumbent
