= Pierre Claver Malgo =

Burkinabe Catholic prelate (born 1954)

The Most Reverend Pierre Claver Malgo
- Bishop of Fada N'Gourma, Burkina Faso
- Church: Catholic Church
- Archdiocese: Roman Catholic Archdiocese of Koupéla
- See: Roman Catholic Diocese of Fada N'Gourma
- Appointed: 11 February 2012
- Installed: 12 May 2012
- Predecessor: Paul Yemboaro Ouédraogo
- Successor: Incumbent

Orders
- Ordination: 7 July 1984
- Consecration: 12 May 2012 by Séraphin François Rouamba
- Rank: Bishop

Personal details
- Born: 14 September 1954 (age 72) Dimistenga, Archdiocese of Koupéla, Centre-Est Region, Burkina Faso

Styles of Pierre Claver Malgo
- Reference style: Your Lordship; The Most Reverend
- Spoken style: His Lordship
- Religious style: Bishop

Pierre Claver Malgo (born 14 September 1954) is a Burkinabe Catholic prelate who is the bishop of the Roman Catholic Diocese of Fada N'Gourma, Burkina Faso since 11 February 2012. Before that, from 7 July 1984 until 11 February 2012, he was a priest of the Catholic Archdiocese of Koupéla. He was appointed bishop by Pope Benedict XVI. He was consecrated and installed at Fada N'gourma on 12 May 2012 by Archbishop Séraphin François Rouamba, Archbishop of Koupéla.

== Background and education ==
He was born on 14 September 1954 in Dimistenga, Archdiocese of Koupéla, Centre-Est Region, Burkina Faso. He studied philosophy and theology at seminari es in Burkina Faso. He studied in the Ivory Coast at the Catholic University of West Africa, graduating with an advanced degree in Biblical Theology.

== Priesthood ==
On 7 July 1984 he was ordained a priest of the Catholic Archdiocese of Koupéla, Burkina Faso. He was a priest until 11 February 2012.

He served in many roles during his priesthood including:

- Lecturer at the Major Seminary of Koumi, Bobo-Dioulasso from 1991 until 1999.
- Rector of the Major Theological Seminary in Ouagadougou from 2005 until 2011.

== As bishop ==
Pope Benedict XVI appointed him as bishop of the Roman Catholic Diocese of Fada N'Gourma, on 11 February 2012. He was consecrated and installed at Fada N'Gourma on 12 May 2012 by the hands of Archbishop Séraphin François Rouamba, Archbishop of Koupéla assisted by Archbishop Paul Yemboaro Ouédraogo, Archbishop of Bobo-Dioulasso and Bishop Lucas Kalfa Sanou, Bishop of Banfora.

== See also ==
- Catholic Church in Burkina Faso

== Succession table ==
Catholic Church titles
Preceded by Paul Yemboaro Ouédraogo (24 January 1997 - 13 November 2010)	Bishop of Fada N'Gourma (since 11 February 2012)	Succeeded by Incumbent
