= Daté Atavito Barnabe-Akayi =

Beninese writer and teacher

Daté Atavito Barnabé-Akayi
- Born: 24 September 1978 (age 47); Benin
- Occupations: Teacher, writer

Daté Atavito Barnabé-Akayi (born 24 September 1978) is a Beninese teacher and writer, known for his work in theatre and poetry.

== Biography ==
=== Early life and education ===
He grew up in Kpalimé. He is an only child on his mother's side but has several siblings on his father's side. He showed an early interest in reading, though he was not particularly passionate about his studies. However, with the support of his maternal uncle, aunt, and other relatives, he completed his education successfully and enrolled at the University of Abomey-Calavi in the Department of Modern Literature. After a brief career in journalism where he managed the culture pages for several newspapers, he became a high school and college teacher.

== Literary work ==
In 2010, he gained public attention with his collection of two plays, Amour en infraction and Les confessions du PR (Plumes Soleil, Cotonou, 2010). The first play openly discusses an improbable love between a teacher and her student, while the second portrays an African head of state guilty of mismanagement and recurrent infidelities, who appears more pitiable than dangerous as he seeks redemption through confession to a priest.

In the same year, he published another play, Quand Dieu a faim (Plumes Soleil, Cotonou, 2010), which addresses the controversial theme of homosexuality and advocates for tolerance and respect for human rights.

In 2011, he released L’Affaire Bissi, a collection of five short stories published by Ruisseaux d'Afrique. These stories use social pressures and strange practices as a backdrop to explore daily life with sensitivity and gravity. Social constraints and strange practices poisoning daily life are the backdrop for the texts in this collection, written simply but full of sensitivity and seriousness. Barnabé-Akayi is known for his prolific output, being the only Beninese writer to have published five books in recent years.

His talent shines most in poetry. Barnabé-Akayi's poetry is intense and unrestrained, expressing a deeply personal voice. After the trilogy Noire comme la rosée, Tristesse ma maîtresse (Plumes Soleil, Cotonou, 2010) and Solitude mon S… (Plumes Soleil, Cotonou, 2012), he explores another aspect of his inner self in Tes lèvres où j’ai passé la nuit. Imonlè 158 (Plumes Soleil, Cotonou, 2014). This work reflects a more festive tone, indicating an inner balance found through the presence of a long-sought and idealized lover.

The author delivers a powerful voice, playing endlessly with a phrasing without punctuation. In fact, without stating it, he invites the reader to infuse the text with their own rhythm, creating breaks, adding commas and periods, in short, making the reader a poet. For, however one approaches this text, unexpected meanings emerge, new ideas appear, offering the reader a rich approach to the work in its multiple facets. Let another poet, Sophie Heidi Kam, a Burkinabe author, express her appreciation:

the poetry, that of Daté reassures me that I am not alone, and that what I feel and write in poetry is not just the outpouring of an isolated soul in the grip of delirium. This is the charm, the beauty, and the tragic aspect of his poetry: In poetry, there is no room for deceit when you allow the heart to open up and speak.

=== Theatre ===
- Amour en infraction and Les confessions du PR, Plumes Soleil, Cotonou, 2010.
- Quand Dieu a faim..., Plumes Soleil, Cotonou, 2010.
- Les confessions du PR, followed by Amour en infraction and Quand Dieu a faim..., Plumes Soleil, Cotonou, 2010.

=== Poetry ===
- Noire comme la rosée, Plumes Soleil, Cotonou, 2011.
- Tristesse ma maîtresse, Plumes Soleil, Cotonou, 2011.
- Solitude mon S…, Plumes Soleil, Cotonou, 2012.
- Tes lèvres où j’ai passé la nuit. Imonlè 158, Plumes Soleil, Cotonou, 2014.

=== Essays ===
- Lire cinq poètes béninois, Plumes Soleil, Cotonou, 2011.
- Entretiens avec des écrivains béninois au programme, Plumes Soleil, Cotonou, 2014.
- Anthologie (coordinator)
- Même l’amour saigne (short story), Plumes Soleil, Cotonou, 2012.
- Obama et nous (miscellaneous), Plumes Soleil, Cotonou, 2013.
- Anxiolytique (poetry), Plumes Soleil, Cotonou, 2013.
- Manuels scolaires de français (collective, under the direction of Inspector Apollinaire Agbazahou, Plumes Soleil, Cotonou)
- Tests de Lecture, 2007 (revised and expanded), 2012.
- Cahier de Lecture, 2009.
- Communication Écrite, 2011.
- Lecture-Écriture. Préparation au bac, 2012.
- Tests de Lecture, Clé de correction, Plumes Soleil/Laha, Cotonou, 2013.
- L’affaire Bissi (short stories), Ruisseaux d'Afrique, Cotonou, 2011.
