= Thomas Kaboré =

Burkinabe clergyman and bishop

- Bishop Emeritus of Kaya
- Church: Catholic Church
- Diocese: Diocese of Kaya
- In office: 19 April 1999 – 7 December 2018
- Predecessor: Jean-Baptiste Tiendrebeogo
- Successor: Théophile Naré

Orders
- Ordination: 29 June 1970
- Consecration: 10 July 1999 by Jean-Marie Untaani Compaoré

Personal details
- Born: 23 September 1943 (age 82) Ouagadougou, Colony of Ivory Coast, French West Africa, French Empire

Thomas Kaboré (born 23 September 1943 in Ouagadougou) is a Burkinabe clergyman and bishop for the Roman Catholic Diocese of Kaya. He was ordained in 1970 and appointed bishop in 1999. He retired in 2018.
