= Savadogo =

Savadogo is a surname. Notable people with the surname include:

- Aminata Savadogo (born 1993), Latvian singer
- Filippe Savadogo, Burkinabe film critic and politician
- Moussa Savadogo, Burkinabé writer and playwright
- Moussa Savadogo (athlete) (born 1959), Malian sprinter
