= Marcel Chauvin =

French clergyman and auxiliary bishop

Marcel Chauvin C.Ss.R.
- Bishop of Fada N’Gourma
- Church: Catholic Church
- Diocese: Diocese of Fada N'Gourma
- In office: 16 June 1964 – 15 June 1979
- Predecessor: Alphonse Chantoux
- Successor: Jean-Marie Untaani Compaoré

Orders
- Ordination: 29 August 1939
- Consecration: 20 December 1964 by Paul Zoungrana

Personal details
- Born: 26 April 1914 Couëron, Loire-Inférieure, France
- Died: 2 July 2004 (aged 90) Valence, Drôme, France

Marcel Chuavin (born 26 April 1914 in Couëron) was a French clergyman and auxiliary bishop for the Roman Catholic Diocese of Fada N'Gourma. He became ordained in 1939. He was appointed bishop in 1964. He died in 2004.
