= Sandra Pierrette Kanzie =

Poet from Burkina Faso

Sandra Pierrette Kanzié (born 14 April 1966, Abidjan, Ivory Coast) is a poet and the first woman from Burkina Faso to be published.

== Biography ==
Kanzié was born in Abidjan, Ivory Coast, on 14 April 1966. Her family moved to Burkina Faso, where she attended primary school at Bobo-Dioulasso and Bo. Kanzié loved writing from a young age and her first poems were published at this time. She graduated from her secondary education at the Lycee Mixte Montaigne, Ouagadougou, in 1988. She studied for the first year of her BA degree at the University of Ouagadougou, then moved to Dakar to study Philosophy. Kanzié has three children.

== Literary career ==
Kanzié is a poet from Burkina Faso who writes in French. An increasing number of women from Burkina Faso have been published there since the 1980s, including Kanzié, Bernadette Dao and Angele Bassole-Ouedraogo. Kanzié's work has been published in Women's Studies Quarterly to illustrate women's writing from her country.

Kanzié is the first woman from Burkina Faso to be published. Her first book, Les tombes qui pleurent, was published in 1987, well before writers such as Bernadette Dao and Rosalie Tall, despite the fact they had been writing long before her. These poems were written after the drowning of her brother and are full of grief. The work is framed as heartbreaking dialogues between a mother and son.

== Publications ==
- Les tombes qui pleurent (Impr. nouvelle du Centre, 1987)
