= Zéphyrin Toé =

Burkinabé Roman Catholic bishop

- Bishop of Dédougou
- Church: Catholic Church
- Diocese: Diocese of Dédougou
- In office: 5 July 1973 – 4 June 2005
- Predecessor: Jean-Marie Lesourd
- Successor: Judes Bicaba

Orders
- Ordination: 6 April 1958
- Consecration: 25 November 1973 by Paul Zoungrana

Personal details
- Born: 30 December 1928 Toma, Upper Volta, French West Africa, French Empire
- Died: 25 November 2013 (aged 84)

Zéphyrin Toé (30 December 1928 − 25 November 2013) was a Burkinabé Roman Catholic bishop.

He was ordained to the priesthood on 6 April 1958. Toé was appointed bishop of the Roman Catholic Diocese of Nouna, Burkina Faso on 5 July 1973. He was later named bishop of the Roman Catholic Diocese of Dédougou, Burkina Faso on 14 April 2000, serving there until his retirement on 14 June 2005.
