= Roman Catholic Diocese of Fada N'Gourma =

Roman Catholic diocese in Burkina Faso

Coordinates: 12.0590°N 0.3615°E

Diocese of Fada N'Gourma Dioecesis Fada Ngurmaensis Diocèse de Fada N'Gourma

Location
- Country: Burkina Faso
- Metropolitan: Archdiocese of Koupéla
- Headquarters: Fada N'gourma, Goulmou Region, Burkina Faso

Statistics
- Area: 46,256 km^{2} (17,860 sq mi)
- Population: Total; Catholics: (as of 2023); 1,942,805; 143,950 (7.4%)
- Parishes: 16

Information
- Denomination: Catholic Church
- Sui iuris church: Latin Church
- Rite: Roman Rite
- Established: 12 February 1959; 67 years ago
- Cathedral: Cathédrale Saint-Joseph in Fada N'Gourma
- Secular priests: 50 (41 Diocesan, 9 Religious Orders)

Current leadership
- Pope: Leo XIV
- Bishop: Pierre Claver Malgo
- Metropolitan Archbishop: Gabriel Sayaogo

The Roman Catholic Diocese of Fada N'Gourma (Latin: Dioecesis Fada Ngurmaënsis) is a diocese located in the city of Fada N'Gourma in the ecclesiastical province of Koupéla in Burkina Faso.

== History ==
- 12 February 1959: Established as Apostolic Prefecture of Fada N'Gourma from the Apostolic Prefecture of Niamey in Niger
- 16 June 1964: Promoted as Diocese of Fada N'Gourma

== Special churches ==
The cathedral is the Cathédrale Saint-Joseph in Fada N'Gourma.

== Persecution ==
The Minor Seminary of Saint Kisito de Bougui was attacked by Jihadists on the night of February 10. No lives were lost, but severe material damage was reported. The attackers burned two dormitories, a classroom, and a vehicle. Another vehicle was stolen, according to charity Aid to the Church in Need (ACN) The seminary had to be moved to Fada N'Gourma for safety reasons. In July 2022 the diocese claimed that over 90% of the villages were no longer accessible, due to the threat of Islamic terrorism, which has worsened since it began in 2005.

In September and October 2025 after a few months of peace, violence erupted again. One catechist was murdered in an ambush and another catechist was kidnapped in the parish of Kouala, though later released.

== Leadership ==
=== Prefect of Fada N'Gourma ===
- Alphonse Chantoux, C.Ss.R. (29 May 1959 – 16 June 1964), resigned

=== Bishops of Fada N'Gourma ===
- Marcel Chauvin, C.Ss.R. (16 June 1964 – 15 June 1979), resigned
- Jean-Marie Untaani Compaoré (15 June 1979 – 10 June 1995), appointed Archbishop of Ouagadougou
- Paul Yemboaro Ouédraogo (24 January 1997 – 13 November 2010), appointed Archbishop of Bobo-Dioulasso
- Pierre Claver Malgo (11 February 2012 – Present)

=== Another priest of this diocese who became bishop ===
- David Koudougou (2001-2012), appointed Bishop of Tenkodogo in 2025

== See also ==
- Roman Catholicism in Burkina Faso
