= Caritas Africa =

Confederation of Catholic social service providers and relief organisations

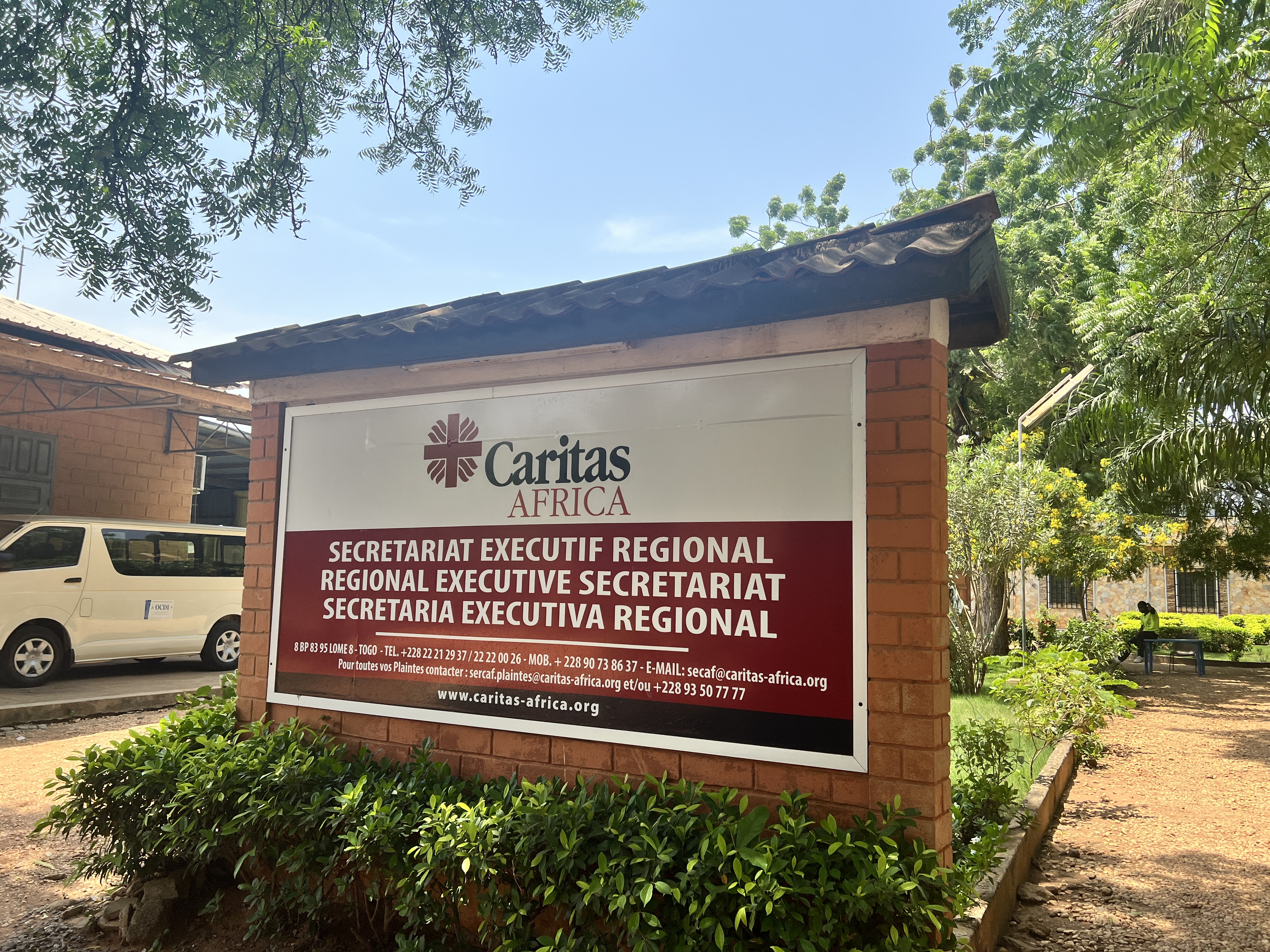
- Abbreviation: CA
- Established: 1995
- Purpose: Humanitarian aid, International development, and social service
- Location: Lomé, Togo
- Coordinates: 6.14958°N 1.20992°E
- Region served: Africa
- Official language: English, French, Portuguese
- Secretary General: Lucy Esipila
- President: Pierre Cibambo
- Main organ: General Assembly, Executive Board
- Parent organization: Caritas Internationalis
- Website: caritas-africa.org

Caritas Africa is a confederation of Catholic social service, international development and humanitarian relief organisations operating across Africa. It is one of the seven regions of Caritas Internationalis.

Caritas Africa refers to both the African network with its 46 member organizations, and its secretariat based in Lomé in Togo. The official languages of the organisation are English, French, and Portuguese.

== Work ==
The member organisations of Caritas Africa work to alleviate poverty and provide humanitarian responses in their countries. The regional secretariat is engaged in political advocacy at African and global level, and engages in capacity strengthening of its members.

== Membership ==
Caritas Africa has 46 member organisations spanning the sub-Saharan region, encompassing the islands in the Indian Ocean and the Atlantic. Caritas Africa does not extend its coverage to the entirety of the African continent, as Caritas organisations in the Maghreb, Mashriq, and partially the Horn of Africa belong to a distinct region within Caritas Internationalis, specifically Caritas Middle East and North Africa.

The national Caritas organisations are the members of Caritas Africa. In most countries, each national organisation serves as an umbrella for various diocesan Caritas organisations. Diocesan and parish Caritas groups operate locally but are not direct members of Caritas Africa. In addition, Caritas agencies from other regions sometimes run country offices in African countries, such as CAFOD, Caritas Czech Republic, Caritas Switzerland, CRS or Trócaire, which are also not part of Caritas Africa, although mostly the Caritas agencies in the developed world prefer to support development by establishing partnerships with local agencies: for example, Caritas Australia's action in Malawi is delivered through its partnership with the country's Catholic Development Commission (CADECOM), and CAFOD works with Caritas Marsabit as a partner in northern Kenya.

=== List of member organisations ===
| Country | Member organisation (English name) | Member organisation (Local or alternative name) | Established |
|---|---|---|---|
| Angola | Caritas Angola | Caritas de Angola | 1957 |
| Benin | Caritas Benin | Caritas Bénin | 1958 |
| Botswana | Caritas Botswana | — | 1984 |
| Burkina Faso | Caritas Burkina Faso | Organisation catholique pour le développement et la solidarité (OCADES Caritas Burkina) | 1956 |
| Burundi | Caritas Burundi | — | 1962 |
| Cameroon | Caritas Cameroon | Fondation Caritas Cameroun | 1971 |
| Cape Verde | Caritas Cape Verde | Caritas Caboverdiana | 1976 |
| Central African Republic | Caritas Central African Republic | Caritas Centrafrique | 1960 |
| Chad | Caritas Chad | Caritas Tchad | 1986 |
| Comoros | Caritas Comoros | Caritas Comores | 1979 |
| Republic of the Congo | Caritas Congo Brazzaville | — | ? |
| Democratic Republic of the Congo | Caritas Congo | — | 1960 |
| Ivory Coast | Caritas Côte d'Ivoire | — | 1955 |
| Equatorial Guinea | Caritas Equatorial Guinea | ? | 1980 |
| Eritrea | Caritas Eritrea | Eritrean Catholic Secretariat | ? |
| Ethiopia | Caritas Ethiopia | Ethiopian Catholic Church Social and Development Commission (ECC SDCO) | 1965 |
| Gabon | Caritas Gabon | — | 1967 |
| Gambia | Caritas Gambia | Catholic Development Office (CaDO) | 2001 |
| Ghana | Caritas Ghana | — | 1960 |
| Guinea | Caritas Guinea | Organisation Catholique pour la Promotion Humaine (OCPH) / Caritas Guinée | 1986 |
| Guinea-Bissau | Caritas Guinea-Bissau | Caritas Guiné-Bissau | 1982 |
| Kenya | Caritas Kenya | — | 1973 |
| Lesotho | Caritas Lesotho | — | 1970 |
| Liberia | Caritas Liberia | — | 1990 |
| Madagascar | Caritas Madagascar | — | 1959 |
| Malawi | Caritas Malawi | Catholic Development Commission in Malawi (CADECOM) | 1985 |
| Mali | Caritas Mali | — | 1986 |
| Mauritius | Caritas Mauritius | Caritas Île Maurice | 1965 |
| Mozambique | Caritas Mozambique | Caritas Moçambicana | 1977 |
| Namibia | Caritas Namibia | — | 1987 |
| Niger | Caritas Niger | Caritas Développement Niger (CADEV) | 1962 |
| Nigeria | Caritas Nigeria | Catholic Caritas Foundation of Nigeria (CCFN) | 2010 |
| Rwanda | Caritas Rwanda | — | 1960 |
| São Tomé and Príncipe | Caritas São Tomé and Príncipe | Caritas de São Tomé e Príncipe | 1981 |
| Senegal | Caritas Senegal | — | 1966 |
| Seychelles | Caritas Seychelles | — | 1975 |
| Sierra Leone | Caritas Sierra Leone | — | 1981 |
| South Africa | Caritas South Africa | Siyabhabha Trust Caritas South Africa | 1970 |
| South Sudan | Caritas South Sudan | — | 2011 |
| Sudan | Caritas Sudan | Caritas Sudan / Sudanaid | 1972 |
| Tanzania | Caritas Tanzania | — | 1971 |
| Togo | Caritas Togo | Organisation de la charité pour un développement intégral (OCDI) / Caritas Togo | 1967 |
| Uganda | Caritas Uganda | — | 1970 |
| Zambia | Caritas Zambia | — | 2001 |
| Zimbabwe | Caritas Zimbabwe | Caritas Zimbabwe / Catholic Development Commission (CADEC) | 1972 |
| Eswatini | Caritas Swaziland | — | 1977 |

== Executive leadership ==
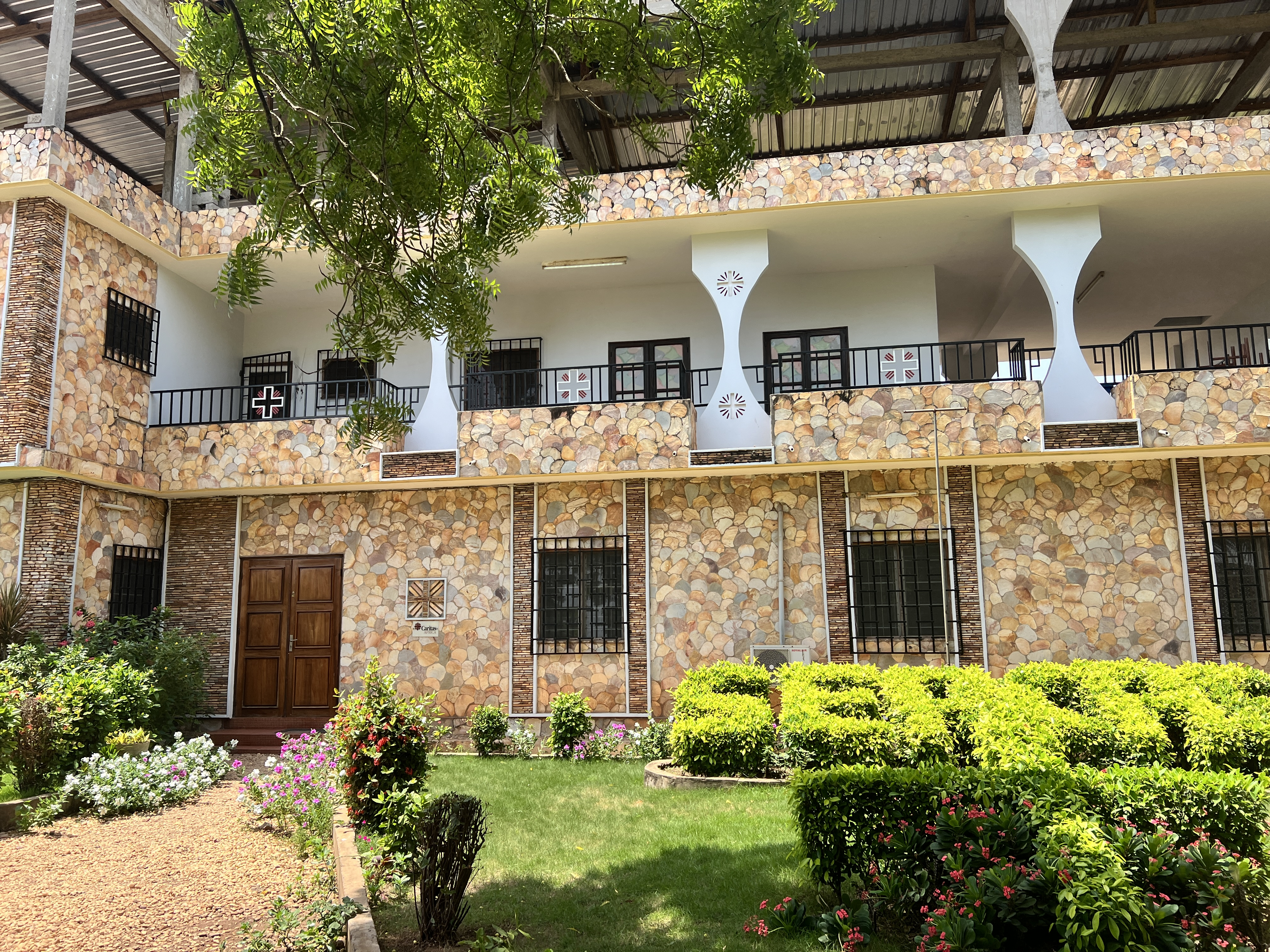
Office of Caritas Africa secretariat in Lomé.

=== Presidents ===
- 1995–2003: Charles Palmer-Buckle
- ...
- 20??-2015: Francisco João Silota
- 2015–2023: Gabriel Justice Yaw Anokye
- 2023-now: Msgr. Pierre Cibambo

=== Regional coordinators ===
- 2015–2023: Albert Mashika
- 2023-now: Lucy Esipila
