= Judes Bicaba =

Burkinabé Roman Catholic bishop

- Bishop of Dédougou
- Church: Catholic Church
- Diocese: Diocese of Dédougou
- In office: 4 June 2005 – 19 August 2016
- Predecessor: Zéphyrin Toé
- Successor: Prosper Bonaventure Ky

Orders
- Ordination: 12 July 1975
- Consecration: 1 October 2005 by Zéphyrin Toé

Personal details
- Born: 1947 Ouakara (near Bondokuy), Upper Volta, French West Africa, French Empire
- Died: 19 August 2016 (aged 68–69)

Judes Bicaba (1947 – August 19, 2016) was a Burkinabé Roman Catholic bishop.

Ordained to the priesthood in 1975, Bicaba served as bishop of the Roman Catholic Diocese of Dédougou, Burkina Faso from 2005 until his death in 2016.

== See also ==
- Roman Catholicism in Burkina Faso
