= Théophile Naré =

Burkinabe Catholic prelate (born 1966)

The Most Reverend Théophile Naré
- Bishop of Kaya, Burkina Faso
- Church: Catholic Church
- Archdiocese: Roman Catholic Archdiocese of Koupéla
- See: Roman Catholic Diocese of Kaya
- Appointed: 7 December 2018
- Installed: 2 March 2019
- Predecessor: Thomas Kaboré
- Successor: Incumbent
- Other posts: Apostolic Administrator of Dori Diocese, Burkina Faso (since 2 February 2025)

Orders
- Ordination: 9 July 1995
- Consecration: 2 March 2019 by Piergiorgio Bertoldi
- Rank: Bishop

Personal details
- Born: Théophile Naré; 7 July 1966 (age 60) Yargo, Archdiocese of Koupéla, Centre-Est Region, Burkina Faso

Styles of Théophile Naré
- Reference style: Your Lordship; The Most Reverend
- Spoken style: His Lordship
- Religious style: Bishop

Théophile Naré (born 7 July 1966) is a Burkinabe Catholic prelate who is the bishop of the Roman Catholic Diocese of Kaya, Burkina Faso since 7 December 2018. Before that, from 8 July 1995 until 7 December 2018, he was a priest of the Catholic Archdiocese of Koupéla. He was consecrated and installed at Kaya on 2 March 2019 by Archbishop Piergiorgio Bertoldi, Titular Archbishop of Hispellum. Bishop Théophile Naré was appointed Apostolic Administrator of the Roman Catholic Diocese of Dori, Burkina Faso, since 2 February 2025.

== Background and education ==
He was born on 7 July 1966 in Yargo, in the diocese of Koupéla. He studied philosophy at Saint Jean Baptiste de Wayalghin Interdiocesan Seminary, in Ouagadougou. He then studied theology at the Saint Pierre Claver de Koumi Interdiocesan Major Seminary, in Bobo-Dioulasso. He was ordained a priest of the Roman Catholic Archdiocese of Koupéla on 8 July 1995.

He also holds a degree in Sacred Scripture, awarded by the Pontifical Biblical Institute (Biblicum), in Rome, Italy, where he studied from 2000 until 2005. As part of that degree, he also studied at the École Biblique de Jérusalem in Jerusalem. Between 2005 and 2006, he studied at the Institute for the Training of Clergy Educators (IFEC), in Paris, France, where he obtained a "certificate in training for clergy educators".

== Priesthood ==
On 8 July 1995, he was ordained a priest of the Archdiocese of Koupéla. He was a priest until 7 December 2018.

He served in many roles during his priesthood including:

- Vicar at the cathedral of Koupéla from 1995 until 2000.
- Parish administrator of the cathedral of Koupéla from 2006 until 2011.
- Professor of exegesis at the Saint John the Baptist Theological Major Seminary in Wayalghin from 2006 until 2011.
- Rector and lecturer at the Saint Pierre Claver de Koumi Theological Major Seminary in Bobo-Dioulasso from 2011 until 2018.

== As bishop ==
Pope Francis appointed him as bishop of the Roman Catholic Diocese of Kaya, on 7 December 2018. He was consecrated and installed at Kaya on 2 March 2019 by the hands of Archbishop Piergiorgio Bertoldi, Titular Archbishop of Hispellum assisted by Archbishop Séraphin François Rouamba, Archbishop of Koupéla and Bishop Thomas Kaboré, Bishop Emeritus of Kaya.

While bishop of Kaya, he was concomitantly appointed Apostolic Administrator of the Roman Catholic Diocese of Dori since 2 February 2025.

== See also ==
- Catholic Church in Burkina Faso

== Succession table ==
Catholic Church titles
Preceded by Thomas Kaboré (19 April 1999 - 7 December 2018)	Bishop of Kaya (since 7 December 2018)	Succeeded by Incumbent
