= Wenceslas Compaoré =

Burkinabé Roman Catholic priest (1934–2023)

His Excellency Wenceslas Compaoré
- Bishop Emeritus of Manga
- Archdiocese: Ouagadougou
- Appointed: 2 January 1997
- Term ended: 28 December 2010
- Predecessor: Position created
- Successor: Gabriel Sayaogo

Orders
- Ordination: 8 September 1962
- Consecration: 18 May 1997 by Jozef Tomko

Personal details
- Born: 8 November 1934 Kombissiri, French West Africa
- Died: 18 June 2023 (aged 88) Ouagadougou, Burkina Faso

Wenceslas Compaoré (8 November 1934 – 18 June 2023) was a Burkinabé Roman Catholic prelate who was bishop of Manga from 1997 to 2010.

Catholic Church titles
| Preceded by Position created | Bishop of Manga; 1997–2010 | Succeeded by Gabriel Sayaogo |
