= Constantin Guirma =

Burkinabé prelate of the Roman Catholic Church

- Bishop of Diocese of Kaya Emeritus
- Church: Roman Catholic Church
- See: Diocese of Kaya
- In office: 1969–1996
- Predecessor: None
- Successor: Jean-Baptiste Tiendrebeogo

Orders
- Ordination: 19 May 1946

Personal details
- Born: 5 February 1920 Kaya, Burkina Faso
- Died: 6 August 2010 (aged 90)

Constantin Guirma (5 February 1920 – 6 August 2010) was a Burkinabé prelate of the Roman Catholic Church.

Guirma was born in Kaya, Burkina Faso, and was ordained a priest on 19 May 1946. He was appointed Bishop of the Diocese of Kaya on 26 June 1969, and ordained bishop on 1 August 1969 by Pope Paul VI in Kampala during his first pontifical visit to Africa. Guirma remained there until his retirement on 9 March 1996. He died after illness on 6 August 2010.
