= Lucas Kalfa Sanou =

Burkinabe Catholic prelate (born 1951)

The Most Reverend Lucas Kalfa Sanou
- Bishop of Banfora, Burkina Faso
- Church: Catholic Church
- Archdiocese: Roman Catholic Archdiocese of Bobo-Dioulasso
- See: Roman Catholic Diocese of Banfora
- Appointed: 27 June 1998
- Installed: 12 December 1998
- Predecessor: None (Diocese created)
- Successor: Incumbent

Orders
- Ordination: 1 July 1978
- Consecration: 12 December 1998 by Anselme Titianma Sanou
- Rank: Bishop

Personal details
- Born: Lucas Kalfa Sanou; 4 September 1951 (age 75) Dugona, Archdiocese of Bobo-Dioulasso, Houet Province, Burkina Faso

Styles of Lucas Kalfa Sanou
- Reference style: Your Lordship; The Most Reverend
- Spoken style: His Lordship
- Religious style: Bishop

Lucas Kalfa Sanou (born 4 September 1951) is a Burkinabe Catholic prelate who is the bishop of the Roman Catholic Diocese of Banfora, Burkina Faso since 27 June 1998. Before that, from 1 July 1978 until 27 June 1998, he was a priest of the Catholic Archdiocese of Bobo-Dioulasso. He was appointed bishop by Pope John Paul II. He was consecrated and installed at Banfora on 12 December 1998 by Bishop Anselme Titianma Sanou, Bishop of Bobo-Dioulasso.

== Background and priesthood ==
He was born on 4 September 1951 in Dugona, Archdiocese of Bobo-Dioulasso, Houet Province, Burkina Faso. After studying philosophy and theology at seminary, he was ordained a priest of the Roman Catholic Archdiocese of Bobo-Dioulasso on 1 July 1978. He served as a priest until 27 June 1998.

== As bishop ==
Pope John Paul II appointed him as bishop of the Roman Catholic Diocese of Banfora on 27 June 1998, the same day The Holy See created the diocese, a suffragan of the ecclesiastical province of Bobo-Dioulasso. He was consecrated and installed at Banfora on 12 December 1998 by the hands of Bishop Anselme Titianma Sanou, Bishop of Bobo-Dioulasso assisted by Archbishop Jean-Marie Untaani Compaoré, Archbishop of Ouagadougou and Bishop Maixent Coly, Bishop of Ziguinchor. He is the Local Ordinary at Banfora as of April 2023.

On 10 December 2020 when Burkina Faso marked her 60th Independence Day, Bishop Lucas Kalfa Sanou was given a Presidential Award in recognition for the work that he does for the Catholic Church, the community and the country.

Bishop Lucas Kalfa Sanou was the Local Ordinary at Banfora in January 2021 when Father Rodrigue Sanon, a member of the clergy of the diocese went missing on 19 January 2021. Two days later his dead body was found dumped in a forest about 20 kilometres (12 mi) away from his intended destination.

== See also ==
- Catholic Church in Burkina Faso

== Succession table ==
Catholic Church titles
| Preceded by None (Diocese created) | Bishop of Banfora (since 27 June 1998 | Succeeded by Incumbent |
