= Nouna Department =

Coordinates: 12.7333°N 3.8667°W

Nouna
- Department
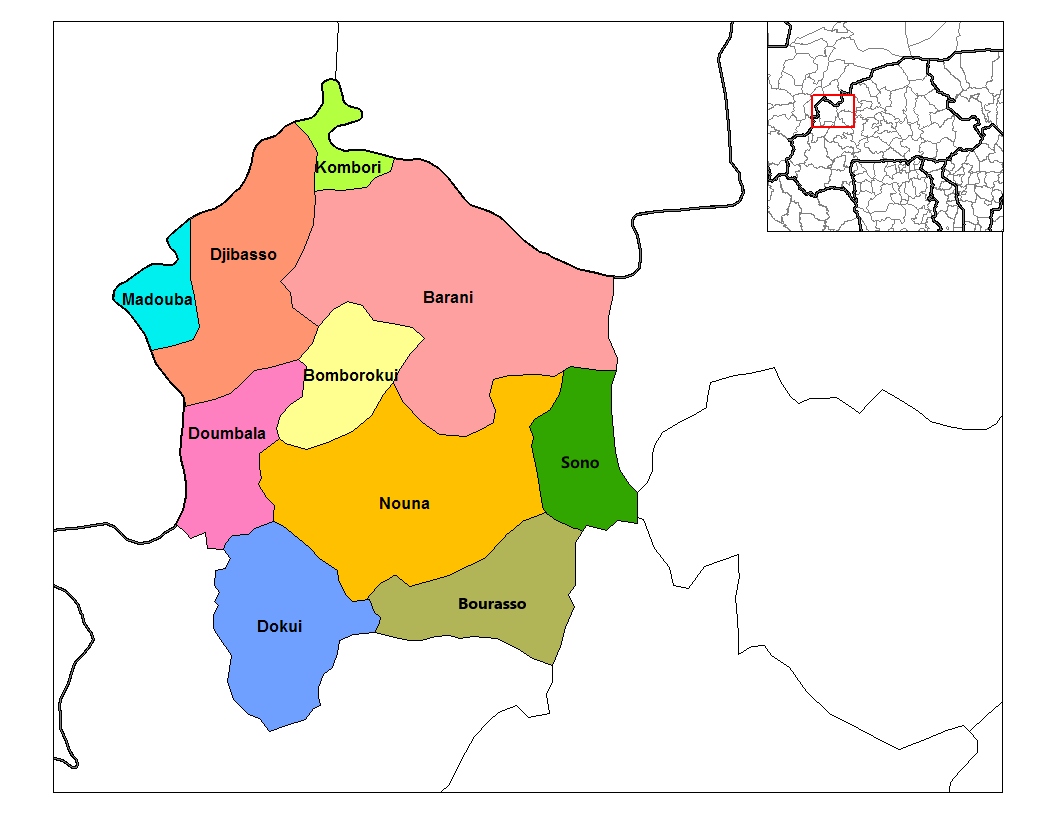
- Nouna Department location in the province
- Country: Burkina Faso
- Province: Kossi Province

Area
  - Department: 575 sq mi (1,488 km^{2})

Population (2019)
  - Department: 89,718
  - Density: 156.2/sq mi (60.29/km^{2})
  - Urban: 32,428
- Time zone: UTC+0 (GMT 0)

Nouna is a department or commune of Kossi Province in western Burkina Faso. Its capital is the town of Nouna. According to the 2019 census the department has a total population of 89,718.

== Towns and villages ==
- Nouna (32,428 inhabitants) (capital)
- Aourèma (363)
- Babekolon (656)
- Bagala (1,252)
- Bankoumani (1,646)
- Bare (1,273)
- Bisso (503)
- Bonkuy (69)
- Boron (612)
- Damandigui (472)
- Dantiéra (384)
- Dara (2,335)
- Dembelela (433)
- Dembo (1,728)
- Digani (1,532)
- Dina (167)
- Diondougou (164)
- Dionkongo (876)
- Farakuy (427)
- Kaki (1,259)
- Kansara (601)
- Karekuy (361)
- Kalfadougou (560)
- Kemena (2,179)
- Kerena (712)
- Kombara (1,093)
- Konankoira (1,670)
- Konkuini (314)
- Kononiba (398)
- Koredougou (165)
- Koro (2,612)
- Lei (378)
- Mani (781)
- Moinsi (75)
- Mourdie (1,474)
- Niankuy (227)
- Ouette (1,502)
- Pa (1,086)
- Patiarakuy (293)
- Saint-Jean (484)
- Saint-Louis (998)
- Sampopo (755)
- Seré (1,041)
- Seriba (1,216)
- Sien (192)
- Simbadougou (1,076)
- Soa (768)
- Sobon (1,086)
- Soin (1,078)
- Sokoro (902)
- Solimana (1,822)
- Tébéré (563)
- Tenou (1,486)
- Thia (147)
- Tissi (887)
- Tombodougou (806)
- Toni (1,940)
- Tonkoroni (262)
- Tonseré (395)
- Zoun (505)
