= Diocese of Kaya =

Roman Catholic diocese in Burkina Faso

Coordinates: 13.0886°N 1.0800°W

Diocese of Kaya Dioecesis Kayana Diocèse de Kaya

Location
- Country: Burkina Faso
- Headquarters: Kaya, Burkina Faso

Statistics
- Area: 18,000 km^{2} (6,900 sq mi)
- Population: Total; Catholics: (as of 2023); 1,280,000; 150,000 (11.7%)
- Parishes: 6

Information
- Denomination: Catholic Church
- Sui iuris church: Latin Church
- Rite: Roman Rite
- Established: 26 June 1969; 57 years ago
- Secular priests: 50

Current leadership
- Pope: Leo XIV
- Bishop: Théophile Naré
- Metropolitan Archbishop: Gabriel Sayaogo
- Bishops emeritus: Thomas Kaboré

Map
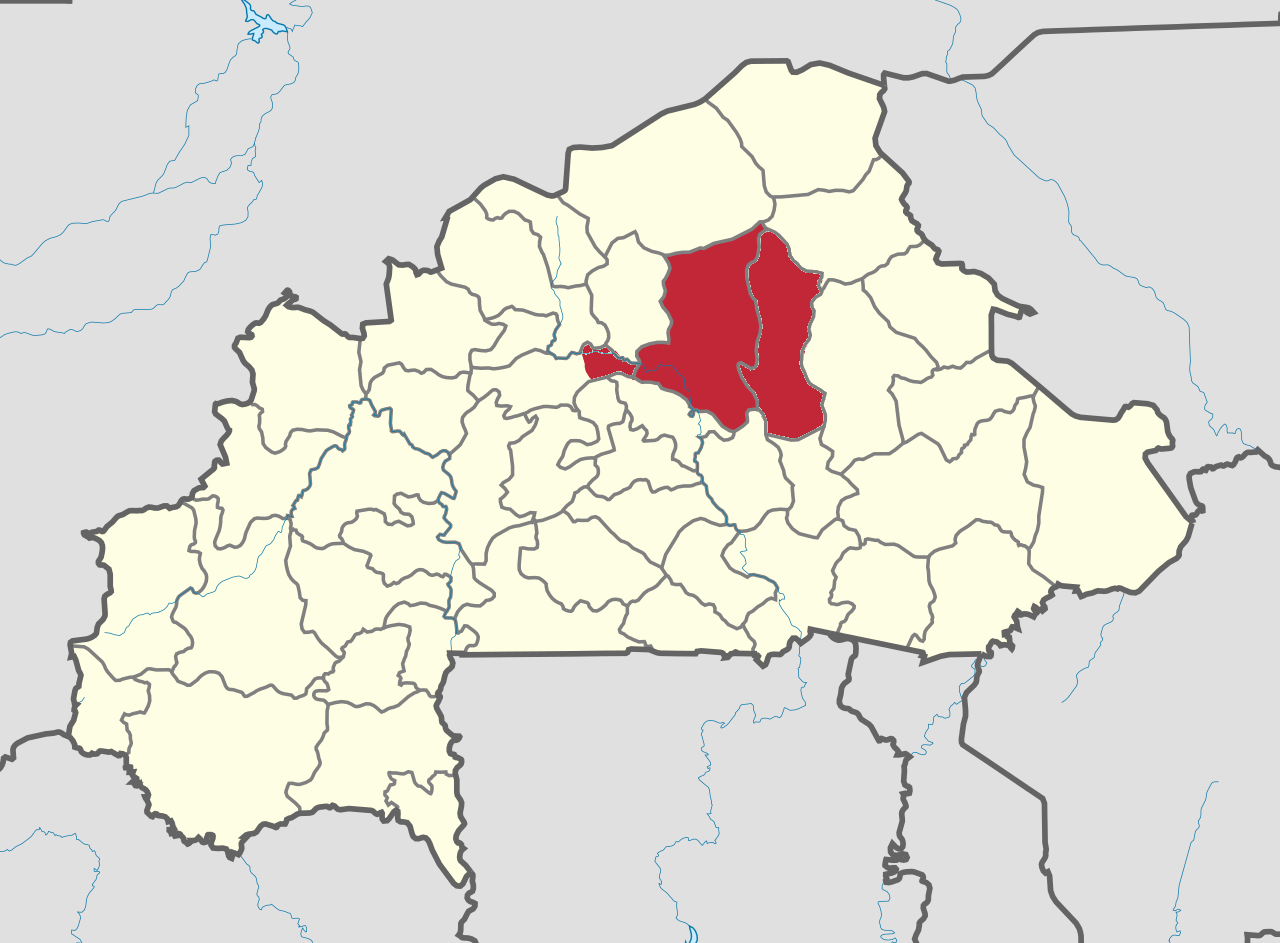

The Roman Catholic Diocese of Kaya (Latin: Dioecesis Kayana) is a diocese located in the city of Kaya in the ecclesiastical province of Koupéla in Burkina Faso.

== History ==
- 26 June 1969: Established as Diocese of Kaya from the Diocese of Koupéla and Metropolitan Archdiocese of Ouagadougou

== Bishops ==
- Bishop Constantin Guirma (26 June 1969 – 9 March 1996)
- Bishop Jean-Baptiste Tiendrebeogo (30 March 1996 – 14 May 1998)
- Bishop Thomas Kaboré (19 April 1999 – 7 December 2018)
- Bishop Théophile Naré (since 7 December 2018)

=== Other priest of this diocese who became bishop ===
- Philippe Nakellentuba Ouédraogo, appointed Bishop of Ouahigouya in 1996; future Cardinal

== See also ==
- Roman Catholicism in Burkina Faso
