= François Bassolet =

Burkinabé journalist, historian, and cultural leader

François Djobi Bassolet (1933- 2 July 2001) was a Burkinabé journalist, historian, and cultural leader.

== Career ==
Bassolet was the first director of the Agence voltaïque de Presse (AVP) from 1978 to 1981, which was later renamed the "Agence d'Information du Burkina" (AIB). He was one of the founders of the Panafrican Film and Television Festival of Ouagadougou (FESPACO), and the author of the first major post-independence history of the nation.

== Selected works ==
- François D. Bassolet, Évolution de la Haute-Volta, de 1898 au 3 janvier 1966 (1968).

== Sources ==
- Paul Ladouceur. Review article, African Studies Review, Vol. 15, No. 3 (Dec., 1972), pp. 521–527
- Quotidien le Pays N°2536 26 December 2001.
