= Diocese of Maradi =

Roman Catholic diocese in Niger

Coordinates: 13.4926°N 7.1044°E

Diocese of Maradi Dioecesis Maradensis

Location
- Country: Niger
- Metropolitan: Niamey

Statistics
- Area: 1,065,560 km^{2} (411,420 sq mi)
- Population: Total; Catholics: (as of 2022); 8,830,000; 2,039 (.0%)

Information
- Denomination: Catholic Church
- Rite: Latin Rite
- Cathedral: Cathedral of Our Lady of Lourdes

Current leadership
- Pope: Leo XIV
- Bishop: Ignatius Anipu, M. Afr.
- Bishops emeritus: Ambroise Ouédraogo

The Diocese of Maradi (Latin: Dioecesis Maradensis) is a Roman Catholic diocese located in Maradi in Niger. It is a suffragan in the province which includes the metropolitan archdiocese of Niamey.

== History ==
- March 13, 2001: Established as Diocese of Maradi from Diocese of Niamey

== Leadership ==
- Bishops of Maradi (Roman rite)
  - Bishop Ambroise Ouédraogo (13 March 2001 – 22 February 2025)
  - Bishop Ignatius Anipu (since 22 February 2025)

== See also ==
- Roman Catholicism in Niger

== Sources ==
- GCatholic.org
- Catholic Hierarchy
