= Guy Armand Romano =

French Roman Catholic bishop (1984–2003)

His Excellency Guy Armand Romano
- Bishop Emeritus of Niamey
- Appointed: 3 March 1997
- Term ended: 25 January 2003
- Predecessor: Marie-Jean-Baptiste-Hippolyte Berlier
- Successor: Michel Christian Cartatéguy
- Previous post: Titular Bishop of Caput Cilla (1984–1997)

Orders
- Ordination: 24 February 1964
- Consecration: 30 September 1984 by Paul Zoungrana

Personal details
- Born: 11 June 1937 Arc-en-Barrois, Haute-Marne, France
- Died: 23 November 2023 (aged 86) Paris, France

Styles of Guy Armand Romano
- Reference style: His Excellency; The Most Reverend
- Spoken style: Your Excellency
- Religious style: Archbishop

Guy Armand Romano (11 June 1937 – 23 November 2023) was a French Roman Catholic prelate. He was Apostolic Administrator of the Roman Catholic Archdiocese of Niamey from 1984 to 1997 and titular bishop of Caput Cilla. He was appointed bishop of Niamey by John Paul II from 1997 to 2003 when he resigned due to poor health. He died in Paris, on 23 November 2023, at the age of 86.

Catholic Church titles
Preceded by Marie-Jean-Baptiste-Hippolyte Berlier	Bishop of Niamey; 1997–2003	Succeeded by Michel Christian Cartatéguy
Preceded by John Hubert Macey Rodgers	Titular Bishop of Caput Cilla; 1984–1997	Succeeded by Joseph Fred Naumann
