= Diocese of Severiana =

The diocese of Severiana (Latin: Seberianensis) was a bishopric in the province of Byzacena in the 5th century. Its only attested bishop, Victorinus, is listed tenth among the Chalcedonian attendees of the Council of Carthage (484). Today, Severiana is a titular see of the Catholic Church in Tunisia.
