= Dimistenga =

Commune in Burkina Faso

- Location within Burkina Faso
- Coordinates: 12°04′58.83″N 0°11′24.55″W
- Country: Burkina Faso
- Province: Kouritenga
- Department: Gounghin
- Elevation: 343 m (1,125 ft)

Population (2006)
  - Total: 1,529
- Time zone: UTC+0 (GMT)

Dimistenga, also spelled Dimstenga, is a commune in the Gounghin Department of Kouritenga Province in the Centre-Est region of Burkina Faso. It had a population of 1,529 in 2006.

== Demographics ==
Year	Population
1985	1,259
1996	1,722
2006	1,529

=== Neighbourhoods ===
Neighbourhood	Population (2006)
Belemboghin	119
Doure	127
Komtoeghin	266
Lilgomde	209
Nabiraboghin	149
Natenga	189
Natinkoutin	125
Nindenga	102
Saabin	125
Yarcin	117
