= Diocese of Dédougou =

Roman Catholic diocese in Burkina Faso

Coordinates: 12.4644°N 3.4647°W

Diocese of Dédougou Dioecesis Deduguensis Diocèse de Dédougou

Location
- Country: Burkina Faso
- Metropolitan: Archdiocese of Bobo-Dioulasso
- Headquarters: Dédougou, Bankui Region, Burkina Faso

Statistics
- Area: 28,374 km^{2} (10,955 sq mi)
- Population: Total; Catholics: (as of 2023); 1,303,590; 165,100 (12.7%)
- Parishes: 14

Information
- Denomination: Catholic Church
- Sui iuris church: Latin Church
- Rite: Roman Rite
- Established: 12 June 1947; 79 years ago
- Cathedral: Cathédrale Sainte Anne, Dédougou
- Secular priests: 80 (72 Diocesan, 8 Religious Orders)

Current leadership
- Pope: Leo XIV
- Bishop: Prosper Bonaventure Ky
- Metropolitan Archbishop: Laurent Birfuoré Dabiré

The Roman Catholic Diocese of Dédougou (Latin: Dioecesis Deduguensis) is a diocese located in the city of Dédougou in the ecclesiastical province of Bobo-Dioulasso in Burkina Faso.

== History ==
- 12 June 1947: Established as Prefecture Apostolic of Nouna from the Prefecture Apostolic of Gao
- 18 October 1951: Elevated to Vicariate Apostolic of Nouna
- 14 September 1955: Elevated to Diocese of Nouna
- 3 December 1975: Renamed to Diocese of Nouna–Dédougou
- 14 April 2000: Established as Diocese of Dédougou from Diocese of Nouna–Dédougou

== Special churches ==
The cathedral is the Cathédrale Sainte Anne in Dédougou.

== Leadership ==
Prefect of Nouna

- Jean Lesourd, M. Afr. (17 October 1947 – 18 October 1951 see below)

Vicar Apostolic of Nouna

- Jean Lesourd, M. Afr. (see above 18 October 1951 – 14 September 1955 see below)

Bishops of Nouna

- Jean Lesourd, M. Afr. (see above 14 September 1955 – 5 July 1973), resigned
- Zéphyrin Toé (5 July 1973 – 3 December 1975 see below)

Bishop of Nouna–Dédougou

- Zéphyrin Toé (see above 3 December 1975 – 14 April 2000 see below)

Bishops of Dédougou

- Zéphyrin Toé (see above 14 April 2000 – 4 June 2005), retired
- Judes Bicaba (4 June 2005 – 19 August 2016)
  - Apostolic Administrator Médard Léopold Ouédraogo (3 September 2016 – 21 July 2018), Auxiliary Bishop of Ouagadougou
- Prosper Bonaventure Ky (24 April 2018 – Present)

Other Priests of this diocese who became Bishops

- Joseph Sama (1975-2000), appointed Bishop of Nouna in 2000

== See also ==
- Roman Catholicism in Burkina Faso

== Sources ==
- GCatholic.org
