= Sophie Heidi Kam =

Burkinabe writer (born 1968)

Sophie Heidi Kam (born 1968) is a Burkinabe writer. Her work includes poetry, plays, and stories written in French. She is considered the first female playwright in Burkina Faso and has been honored at the National Grand Prix for Arts and Letters eight times.

== Biography ==
Kam was born in 1968 in Ouagadougou, Burkina Faso. She studied literature at the University of Ouagadougou and is also trained as a computer scientist focused on networks and telecommunications.

Her first published work came in 1997, when she was included in an anthology put together by Traoré Sibiri Omar for the Swiss cultural exchange organization Nawao Production.

Kam published her first play, Et le soleil sourira à la mer, in 2008. She is considered the first woman playwright in Burkina Faso.

Other published works of theater include Nos jours dʼhier and Qu'il en soit ainsi, which won first prize at the National Grand Prix for Arts and Letters in 2012. Her most recent play is Du Caviar Pour un Lapin.

In 2009, she published several poetry collections in quick succession, including Pour un asile, Offrande, and Sanglots et symphonies. She has also written children's books.

Her work deals with society in Burkina Faso and the impact of military conflict in the Sahel on the region's population.

Since her first submission of poems won first prize in 2000, Kam has won awards at the country's National Grand Prix for Arts and Letters eight times.

In 2019, she won the first-ever Plume d'or award from the Ministry of Trade, Industry and Crafts. In 2021, her poetry collection Mémoires vivantes won the grand prize at that Ouagadougou International Book Fair, and it was published the following year.

She says she is inspired by her maternal grandmother, who told folk stories and sang at village ceremonies. Kam later traveled from village to village collecting folk tales to record this oral heritage.

== Selected works ==
=== Plays ===
- Et le soleil sourira à la mer, 2008
- Nos jours dʼhier, 2013
- Qu'il en soit ainsi, 2014

=== Poetry ===
- Pour un asile, 2009
- Sanglot et symphonies, 2009
- Offrande, 2009
- Quêtes, 2009 (reissue)
- Mémoires vivantes, 2022
