= Diocese of Manga =

Roman Catholic diocese in Burkina Faso

Coordinates: 11.6587°N 1.0735°W

The Roman Catholic Diocese of Manga (Latin: Dioecesis Mangana) is a diocese located in the city of Manga in the ecclesiastical province of Ouagadougou in Burkina Faso. The Roman Catholic Diocese of Manga has an area of 25,600 square kilometres (9,870 sq mi), a total population of 574,622, a Catholic population of 107,104, 16 priests, and 21 religious.

Médard Léopold Ouédraogo was appointed as the diocesan bishop in 2022.

== History ==
- January 2, 1997: Established as Diocese of Manga from the Diocese of Koupéla and Metropolitan Archdiocese of Ouagadougou

== Bishops ==
- Bishops of Manga (Roman rite)
  - Bishop Wenceslas Compaoré (2 January 1997 – 28 December 2010)
  - Bishop Gabriel Sayaogo (28 December 2010 – 7 December 2019), appointed Archbishop of Koupéla
  - Bishop Médard Léopold Ouédraogo (appointed 16 June 2022)

== See also ==
- Roman Catholicism in Burkina Faso
