= Malika Ouattara =

Slam poet and musical artist from Burkina Faso

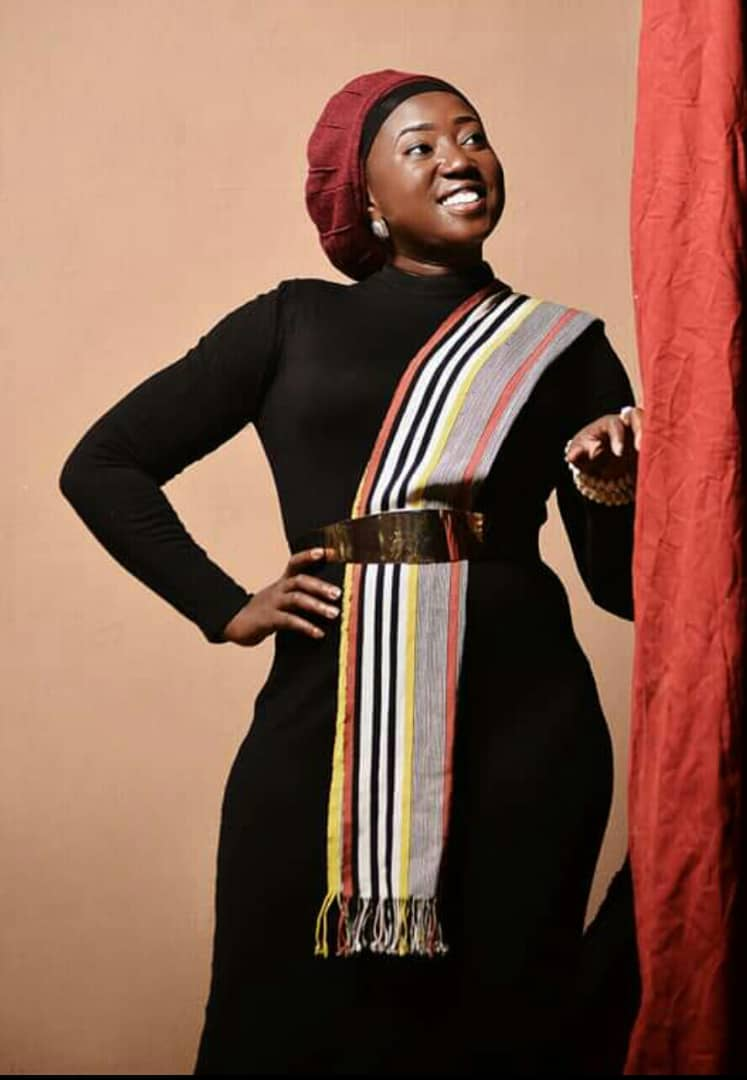

Background information
- Also known as: Malika la Slameuse
- Born: 16 April 1993 (age 33); Ouagadougou
- Genres: Slam poetry
- Occupation: slam artist
- Instrument: Voice

Malika Ouattara (born 16 April 1993) is a slam poet and musical artist from Burkina Faso, known as "Malika la Slameuse".

== Biography ==
Ouattara was born on 16 April 1993 in Ouagadougou in Burkina Faso. She made her performance debut at the Waga Hip Hip Festival in 2009. Her lyrical talent, as well as her presence as a woman on the predominately male slam scene, meant that she became a leading figure in slam in West Africa. In 2017 Outtara estimated that there were only fifteen African women slam poets in total.

She released her first single in 2012, which was part of a project run by the Ministry for Women. In 2013 she made her first television appearances. In 2016 she was photographed by Leila Alaoui, as part of a series focusing on women's empowerment in Burkina Faso. The same year, and postponed by the terrorist attack in which Alaoui was killed, Ouattara released her first album, entitled Slamazone. The album sold more than 5000 copies. Artists who collaborated with Ouattara on it include: Smarty, Greg Burkimbila, Will Be Black and Wendyida. Her music and poetry are socially conscious and feature themes of love, as well as women's rights issues such as unplanned pregnancy. In her single "All Night" she discusses unfaithfulness in relationships. She has won numerous slam awards in West Africa. In June 2015 she took part in a week to raise awareness of issues facing people with albinism in her country.

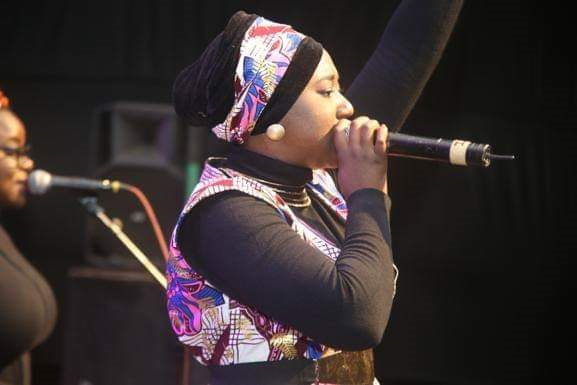
Malika la Slameuse during a performance

In 2019 she set up the Slamazone Foundation of which she is President, in order to fund raise for social issues in her country. However the charity had to reprioritise its work in the face of the COVID-19 pandemic; their focus moved to virus prevention through the promotion of good hygiene. In her previous career she worked for the African Institute of Management. On 10 September 2020, Ouattara encouraged as many of her fanclub as possible to donate blood. She also signed a memorandum of understanding between the Slamazone Foundation and the National Blood Transfusion Centre in Ouagadougou.

Outtara is a practising Muslim. She has received criticism from some members of the public who believe that Muslim women should not perform in public. She has publicly stated that her faith and her art do not contradict each other.
