= Moussa Savadogo =

Burkinabé writer and playwright

Moussa Savadogo is a Burkinabé writer and playwright. He was one of the most important playwrights in Burkinabé theatre following independence and became well known throughout the 1960s and 1970s in Burkina Faso.

Notable works include Fille de le Volta (Daughter of the Volta) and L'oracle (The Oracle).
