= Diocese of Diébougou =

Roman Catholic diocese in Burkina Faso

Coordinates: 10.9679°N 3.2465°W

Diocese of Diébougou Dioecesis Diebuguensis

Location
- Country: Burkina Faso
- Ecclesiastical region: Archdiocese of Bobo-Dioulasso
- Headquarters: Diébougou

Statistics
- Area: 7,973 km^{2} (3,078 sq mi)
- Population: Total; Catholics: (as of 2023); 598,709; 249,507 (41.7%)
- Parishes: 17

Information
- Denomination: Catholic Church
- Sui iuris church: Latin Church
- Rite: Roman Rite
- Established: 18 October 1968; 57 years ago
- Cathedral: Cathedral of Saint-Pierre and Saint-Paul of Diébougou

Current leadership
- Pope: Leo XIV
- Bishop: Dèr Raphaël Kusiélé Dabiré
- Metropolitan Archbishop: Laurent Birfuoré Dabiré
- Bishops emeritus: Jean-Baptiste Kpiéle Somé

The Roman Catholic Diocese of Diébougou (Latin: Dioecesis Diebuguensis) is a diocese located in the city of Diébougou in the ecclesiastical province of Bobo-Dioulasso in Burkina Faso.

== History ==
- 18 October 1968: Established as Diocese of Diébougou from the then-Diocese of Bobo-Dioulasso
- 30 November 2011: Territory is taken from the Diocese by Pope Benedict XVI to establish the newly erected Roman Catholic Diocese of Gaoua, which also becomes suffragan to the Archdiocese of Bobo-Dioulasso. See below.

== Special churches ==
The cathedral is the Cathédrale Saint-Pierre et Saint-Paul in Diébougou.

== Bishops ==
- Bishops of Diébougou (Roman rite), in reverse chronological order
  - Bishop Der Raphaël Dabiré Kusiélé (since 3 April 2006)
  - Bishop Jean-Baptiste Somé (18 October 1968 – 3 April 2006), retired

=== Other priests of this diocese who became bishops ===
- Ollo Modeste Kambou, appointed Bishop of Gaoua in 2011
- Laurent Birfuoré Dabiré, appointed Bishop of Dori in 2013

== See also ==
- Roman Catholicism in Burkina Faso
