= Archdiocese of Niamey =

Roman Catholic archdiocese in Niger

Coordinates: 13.5183°N 2.1111°E

Archdiocese of Niamey Archidioecesis Niameyensis

Location
- Country: Niger
- Ecclesiastical province: Province of Niger

Statistics
- Area: 200,000 km^{2} (77,000 sq mi)
- Population: Total; Catholics: (as of 2021); 11,183,000; 27,600 (.2%)
- Parishes: 18

Information
- Denomination: Catholic Church
- Rite: Latin Rite
- Cathedral: Cathedral of Our Lady of Perpetual Help

Current leadership
- Pope: Leo XIV
- Archbishop: Djalwana Laurent Lompo
- Bishops emeritus: Michel Christian Cartatéguy

The Archdiocese of Niamey (Latin: Archidioecesis Niameyensis) is a Roman Catholic Archdiocese in Niger. It is based in the capital city of Niamey and was erected on 28 April 1942. Pope Benedict XVI made it an archdiocese in June 2007. It uses the Latin Rite and covers approximately 200,000 square kilometres (80,000 mi^{2}).

As of 2004, the diocesan population was about 5,880,000 with 0.3% Catholic. 29 priests were in the diocese for a ratio of 517 Catholics per priest. Djalwana Laurent Lompo has been the head of the archdiocese since October 2014.

This archdiocese is the metropolitan of a province having one suffragan diocese: Maradi.

== Bishops ==
Prefects Apostolic of Niamey

- Fr. François Faroud, S.M.A. (1942-1948), appointed Prefect of Parakou, Dahomey (country since renamed Benin)
- Fr. Constant Quillard, C.SS.R. (1948-1961)

Bishops of Niamey

- Marie-Jean-Baptiste-Hippolyte Berlier, C.SS.R. (1961-1984)
- Guy Armand Romano, C.SS.R. (1997-2003)
- Michel Christian Cartatéguy, S.M.A. (2003-2007), elevated to Archbishop when see raised to Archdiocese in 2007

Archbishops of Niamey (since 2007)

- Michel Christian Cartatéguy, S.M.A. (2007-2014), became Archbishop when see raised to Archdiocese in 2007
- Djalwana Laurent Lompo (2014- )

Auxiliary Bishops

- Michel Christian Cartatéguy, S.M.A. (1999-2003), appointed Bishop here
- Djalwana Laurent Lompo (2013-2014), appointed Archbishop here
- Ambroise Ouédraogo (1999-2001), appointed Bishop of Maradi
