= Diocese of Gaoua =

Roman Catholic diocese in Burkina Faso

Coordinates: 10.3318°N 3.1817°W

Diocese of Gaoua Dioecesis gaouensis

Location
- Country: Burkina Faso
- Metropolitan: Bobo-Dioulasso

Information
- Rite: Latin Rite
- Cathedral: Cathédrale Sacré-Coeur

Current leadership
- Pope: Leo XIV
- Bishop: Ollo Modeste Kambou

Map
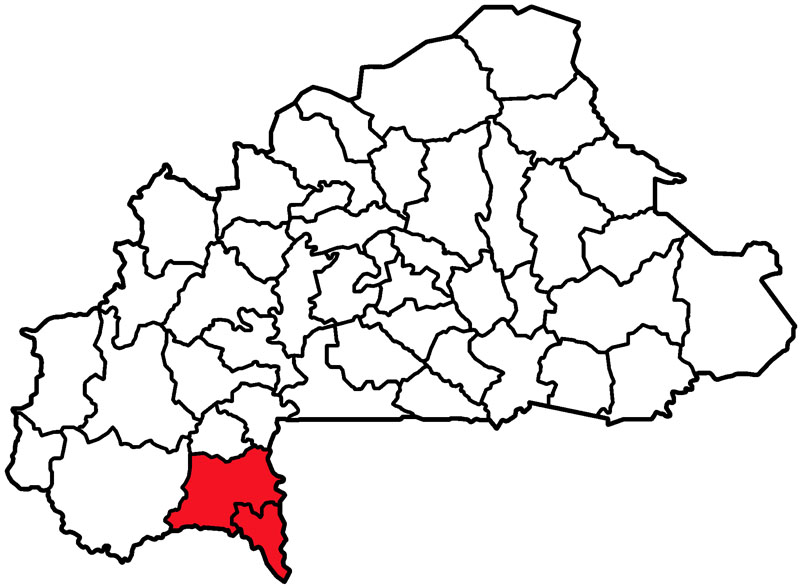
- Map of catholic diocese of Gaoua

The Roman Catholic Diocese of Gaoua (Latin: Dioecesis Gauensis) is a diocese located in the city of Gaoua in the ecclesiastical province of Bobo-Dioulasso in Burkina Faso.

== History ==
- November 30, 2011: Established as Diocese of Gaoua from the Diocese of Diébougou.

== Leadership ==
- Bishops of Gaoua (Roman rite)
  - Bishop Ollo Modeste Kambou (since 30 November 2011)

== See also ==
- Roman Catholicism in Burkina Faso

== Sources ==
- GCatholic.org
