= Gabriel Sayaogo =

Burkinabe Catholic prelate (born 1962)

The Most Reverend Gabriel Sayaogo
- Archbishop of Koupéla, Burkina Faso
- Church: Catholic Church
- Archdiocese: Roman Catholic Archdiocese of Koupéla
- See: Koupéla
- Appointed: 7 December 2019
- Installed: 18 January 2020
- Predecessor: Séraphin François Rouamba
- Successor: Incumbent

Orders
- Ordination: 13 July 1991
- Consecration: 30 April 2011 by Vito Rallo
- Rank: Archbishop

Personal details
- Born: Gabriel Sayaogo; 9 January 1962 (age 64) Niességa, Diocese of Ouahigouya, Burkina Faso

Styles of Gabriel Sayaogo
- Reference style: Your Lordship; The Most Reverend
- Spoken style: His Lordship
- Religious style: Archbishop

Gabriel Sayaogo (born 9 January 1962) is a Burkinabe Catholic prelate who is the archbishop of the Roman Catholic Archdiocese of Koupéla in Burkina Faso since 7 December 2019. Before that, from 28 December 2010 until 7 Dember 2019, he was the bishop of the Diocese of Manga in Burkina Faso. He was appointed bishop on 28 December 2010 by Pope Benedict. He was ordained and installed at Manga, Burkina Faso, on 30 April 2011. His installation as archbishop at Koupéla, took place on 18 January 2020.

== Background and education ==
He was born on 9 January 1962 in Niességa, in the Roman Catholic Diocese of Ouahigouya, in the north of the country. He grew up in Koudougou, west of the capital city of Ouagadougou. He studied philosophy at the Saint-Jean-Baptiste Major Seminary from 1984 until 1986. He then completed his theology studies. He was ordained a priest in Ouahigouya Diocese on 13 July 1991. He holds a Doctorate in Canon Law awarded by the Pontifical Urban University, in Rome, Italy in 2001.

== Priesthood ==
On 13 July 1991, he was ordained a priest of the Roman Catholic Diocese of Ouahigouya, Burkina Faso, a suffragan of the Metropolitan Province of Ouagadougou. He served as priest until 28 December 2010.

He served in various roles and locations while a priest, including as:

- Vicar in the Cathedral parish of Ouahigouya, Burkina Faso from 1991 until 1997.
- Parish priest in Ouahigouya Diocese.
- Professor of canon law at the major seminary of Koumi, Burkina Faso from 2003 until 2007.
- Vicar General of the diocese of Ouahigouya from 2007 until 2009.
- Apostolic Administrator of the Diocese of Ouahigouya from 2009 until 2010.

== As bishop ==
On 28 December 2010, Pope Benedict XVI appointed Father Gabriel Sayaogo, as the new bishop of the Roman Catholic Diocese of Manga, in the ecclesiastical province of Ouagadougou in Burkina Faso. He was consecrated and installed at Manga, Burkina Faso on 28 December 2010 by the hands of Archbishop Vito Rallo, Titular Archbishop of Alba assisted by Archbishop Philippe Nakellentuba Ouédraogo, Archbishop of Ouagadougou and Bishop Wenceslas Compaoré, Bishop Emeritus of Manga.

On 7 December 2019, Pope Francis accepted the resignation from pastoral care of the Metropolitan Province of Koupéla, presented by Archbishop Séraphin François Rouamba. The Holy Father appointed Bishop Gabriel Sayaogo, formerly Bishop of the Diocese of Manga, as the new Metropolitan Archbishop of Ouagadougou, Burkina Faso, effective that day. The new archbishop was installed at Koupéla on 7 December 2019.

== See also ==
- Catholic Church in Burkina Faso

== Succession table ==
Catholic Church titles
Preceded by Wenceslas Compaoré (2 January 1997 - 28 December 2010)	Bishop of Manga (28 December 2010 - 7 December 2019)	Succeeded by Médard Léopold Ouédraogo (since 16 June 2022)
Preceded by Séraphin François Rouamba (1 June 1995 - 7 December 2019)	Archbishop of Koupéla (since 7 December 2019)	Succeeded by Incumbent
