= Diocese of Banfora =

Roman Catholic diocese in Burkina Faso

Coordinates: 10.6439°N 4.7586°W

Diocese of Banfora Dioecesis Banforensis

Location
- Country: Burkina Faso
- Ecclesiastical region: Archdiocese of Bobo-Dioulasso
- Headquarters: Banfora

Statistics
- Area: 18,917 km^{2} (7,304 sq mi)
- Population: Total; Catholics: (as of 2022); 820,000; 37,540 (4.6%)
- Parishes: 9

Information
- Denomination: Catholic Church
- Sui iuris church: Latin Church
- Rite: Roman Rite
- Established: 27 June 1998; 28 years ago
- Cathedral: Cathédrale Saint-Pierre in Banfora

Current leadership
- Pope: Leo XIV
- Bishop: Lucas Kalfa Sanou
- Metropolitan Archbishop: Laurent Birfuoré Dabiré

The Roman Catholic Diocese of Banfora (Latin: Dioecesis Banforensis) is a diocese located in the city of Banfora in the ecclesiastical province of Bobo-Dioulasso in Burkina Faso.

== History ==
On June 27, 1998, it was established as the diocese of Banfora from territory of the diocese of Bobo-Dioulasso.

On January 19, 2021, Rodrigue Sanon, a priest of the diocese, vanished on his way to meet with bishop Lucas Sanou. His body was found in a forest, about 20 kilometres (12 mi) away, on January 21. The bishops of Burkina Faso have denounced violence by Muslim extremist militias.

== Special churches ==
The cathedral is the Cathédrale Saint-Pierre in Banfora.

== Leadership ==
- Bishops of Banfora (Latin Church)
  - Lucas Kalfa Sanou (since 27 June 1998)

== See also ==
- Roman Catholicism in Burkina Faso
