= Paul Yemboaro Ouédraogo =

Burkinabe Catholic prelate (born in 1948)

The Most Reverend Paul Yemboaro Ouédraogo
- Archbishop Emeritus of Bobo-Dioulasso, Burkina Faso
- Church: Catholic Church
- Archdiocese: Roman Catholic Archdiocese of Bobo-Dioulasso
- See: Bobo-Dioulasso
- Appointed: 13 November 2010
- Installed: 13 November 2010
- Term ended: 18 December 2024
- Predecessor: Anselme Titianma Sanon
- Successor: Laurent Birfuoré Dabiré

Orders
- Ordination: 20 July 1974
- Consecration: 18 May 1997 by Cardinal Jozef Tomko
- Rank: Archbishop

Personal details
- Born: Paul Yemboaro Ouédraogo; 3 May 1948 (age 78) Treichville, Archdiocese of Abidjan, Ivory Coast

Styles of Paul Yemboaro Ouédraogo
- Reference style: Your Lordship; The Most Reverend
- Spoken style: His Lordship
- Religious style: Archbishop

Paul Yemboaro Ouédraogo (born 3 May 1948) is a Burkinabe Catholic prelate who served as Archbishop of the Roman Catholic Archdiocese of Bobo-Dioulasso, Burkina Faso, from 13 November 2010 until his retirement on 18 December 2024. Before that, from 24 January 1997 until 13 November 2010, he was the bishop of the Roman Catholic Diocese of Fada N'Gourma, Burkina Faso. He was appointed bishop on 24 January 1997 by Pope John Paul II. He was consecrated and installed at Fada N'Gourma, on 18 May 1997 by Cardinal Jozef Tomko, Cardinal-Priest of Santa Sabina. His age-related request to retire from the pastoral care of the metropolitan archdiocese of Bobo-Dioulasso, Burkina Faso, was accepted on 18 December 2024 by Pope Francis, and Bishop Laurent Birfuoré Dabiré was appointed as his successor as archbishop at Bobo-Dioulasso.

== Background and priesthood ==
He was born on 3 May 1948. He studied philosophy and theology at seminary. He was then ordained a priest of the Roman Catholic Archdiocese of Bobo-Dioulasso, on 20 July 1974. He served as a priest until 24 January 1997.

== As bishop ==
On 24 January 1997, Pope John Paul II appointed him as bishop of the Roman Catholic Diocese of Fada N'Gourma, Burkina Faso. He was consecrated and installed at Fada N'Gourma on 18 May 1997 by the hands of Cardinal Jozef Tomko, Cardinal-Priest of Santa Sabina assisted by Archbishop Jean-Marie Untaani Compaoré, Archbishop of Ouagadougou and Bishop Anselme Titianma Sanon, Bishop of Bobo-Dioulasso.

On 13 November 2010, following the resignation on the Metropolitan Archbishop of the ecclesiastical province of Bobo-Dioulasso, Archbishop Anselme Titianma Sanon, Pope Benedict XVI, appointed Bishop Paul Yemboaro Ouédraogo, formerly the Local Ordinary of Fada N'Gourma Diocese as the new archbishop at Bobo-Dioulasso.

He served there as archbishop from 13 November 2010 until 18 December 2024. For a period, while archbishop, he was elected and he served as chairman of the Episcopal Conference of Burkina Faso and Niger.

On 18 December 2024, Pope Francis accepted the age-related resignation from the pastoral care of the metropolitan archdiocese of Bobo-Dioulasso, Burkina Faso, presented by Archbishop Paul Yembuado Ouédraogo. The Holy Father appointed Bishop Laurent Birfuoré Dabiré, formerly of the Roman Catholic Diocese of Dori as the new archbishop at Bobo-Dioulasso.

== See also ==
- Catholic Church in Burkina Faso

== Succession table ==
Catholic Church titles
| Preceded by Jean-Marie Untaani Compaoré (15 June 1979 - 10 June 1995) | Bishop of Fada N'Gourma (24 January 1997 - 13 November 2010) | Succeeded by Pierre Claver Malgo (since 11 Feb 2012) |
| Preceded by Anselme Titianma Sanon (12 December 1974 - 13 November 2010) | Archbishop of Bobo-Dioulasso (13 November 2010 - 18 December 2024) | Succeeded by Laurent Birfuoré Dabiré (since 18 December 2024) |
