= Diocese of Nouna =

Roman Catholic diocese in Burkina Faso

Coordinates: 12.7343°N 3.8604°W

Diocese of Nouna Dioecesis Nunensis Diocèse de Nouna

Location
- Country: Burkina Faso
- Metropolitan: Archdiocese of Bobo-Dioulasso
- Headquarters: Nouna, Bankui Region, Burkina Faso

Statistics
- Area: 15,000 km^{2} (5,800 sq mi)
- Population: Total; Catholics: (as of 2023); 704,078; 85,098 (12.1%)
- Parishes: 10

Information
- Denomination: Catholic Church
- Sui iuris church: Latin Church
- Rite: Roman Rite
- Established: 14 April 2000; 26 years ago
- Cathedral: Cathédrale Notre-Dame-du-Perpétuel-Secours de Nouna
- Secular priests: 40 (all Diocesan)

Current leadership
- Pope: Leo XIV
- Bishop: Guy Mukasa Sanon
- Metropolitan Archbishop: Laurent Birfuoré Dabiré
- Bishops emeritus: Joseph Sama

The Roman Catholic Diocese of Nouna (Latin: Dioecesis Nunensis) is a diocese located in the city of Nouna in the ecclesiastical province of Bobo-Dioulasso in Burkina Faso.

== History ==
- 14 April 2000: Established as Diocese of Nouna from Diocese of Nouna–Dédougou

== Persecution ==
Like many other parts of Burkina Faso, the Diocese of Nouna has been subjected to incidents of persecution of Christians by Muslim extremists. One such case occurred in July 2022, when jihadists attacked the village of Bourasso killing at least 22 people, according to official figures, though some witnesses spoke of up to 30 deaths.

After a few months of peace, violence returned in October 2025, according to ACN. On 6 October three teenagers were pulled off a bus and executed by terrorists in Madouba, near the border with Mali and soon after that 15 people were killed when armed men fired on a bus and other vehicles travelling on the road from Nouna to Dédougou.

== Special churches ==
The cathedral is the Cathédrale Notre Dame du Perpétuel Sécours in Nouna.

== Leadership ==
=== Bishops of Nouna ===
- Joseph Sama (14 April 2000 – 25 January 2025), retired
  - Apostolic Administrator Joseph Sama (25 January 2025 – 11 May 2025), Bishop Emeritus of Nouna
- Guy Mukasa Sanon (25 January 2025 – Present)

== See also ==
- Roman Catholicism in Burkina Faso
