= Adiza Sanoussi =

Burkinabé novelist

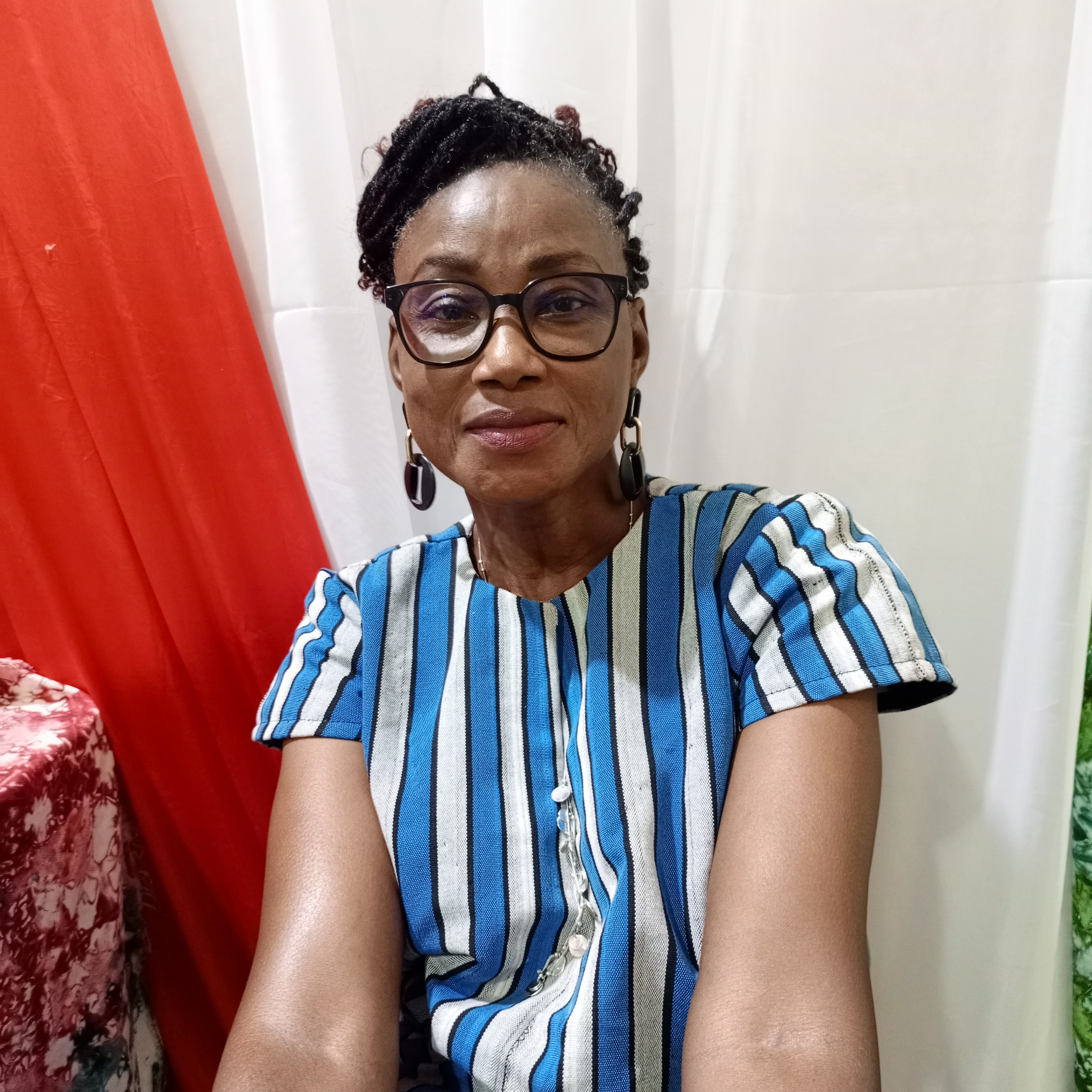
- Occupation: Novelist
- Writing career
- Language: French

Adiza Sanoussi is the nom de plume of Alizata Sana, a contemporary Burkinabé novelist.

== Biography ==
Born on the border between Burkina Faso and Niger, she has a CAPES diploma, a Maîtrise in Physical Geography, and a Certificate of Higher Studies in Cooperative Economics. She began writing in 2001. From 2004, she managed the archives of the Burkinabé Ministère des Enseignements Secondaires, Supérieurs et de la recherche Scientifique, then in 2008 became head of the computer archives department in the same ministry. She is currently (2016) a lecturer at the Institut Panafricain d’Etudes de Recherche sur les Médias, l’Information et la Communication (IPERMIC) of the University of Ouagadougou. She has published six books in French. They treat social problems facing African young people such as forced marriage, prostitution and rural exodus.

== Selected works ==
- 2001: Les deux maris. Paris: Editions Moreux (283 pages) ISBN 2-85112-029-8.
- 2005: Devoir de cuissage. Ouagadougou: Editions JEL (142 pages) ISBN 2-915889-03-1.
- 2010: Et Yallah s’exila. Ouagadougou: Editions JEL (161 pages) ISBN 978-2-915-88906-2.
- 2012: Sopam, le duc de Liptougou. Paris: Harmattan. (184 pages) ISBN 978-2-336-00179-1.
- 2013: Ciel dégagé sur Ouaga. Ouagadougou: Harmattan Burkina (146 pages) ISBN 978-2-677-92103-1.
- L'Empire Lidea

== Awards ==
In 2008, she was awarded the Chevalier de l’Ordre du mérite des arts, de la culture et de la communication, at the Ouagadougou International Book Fair.
