= Nouna =

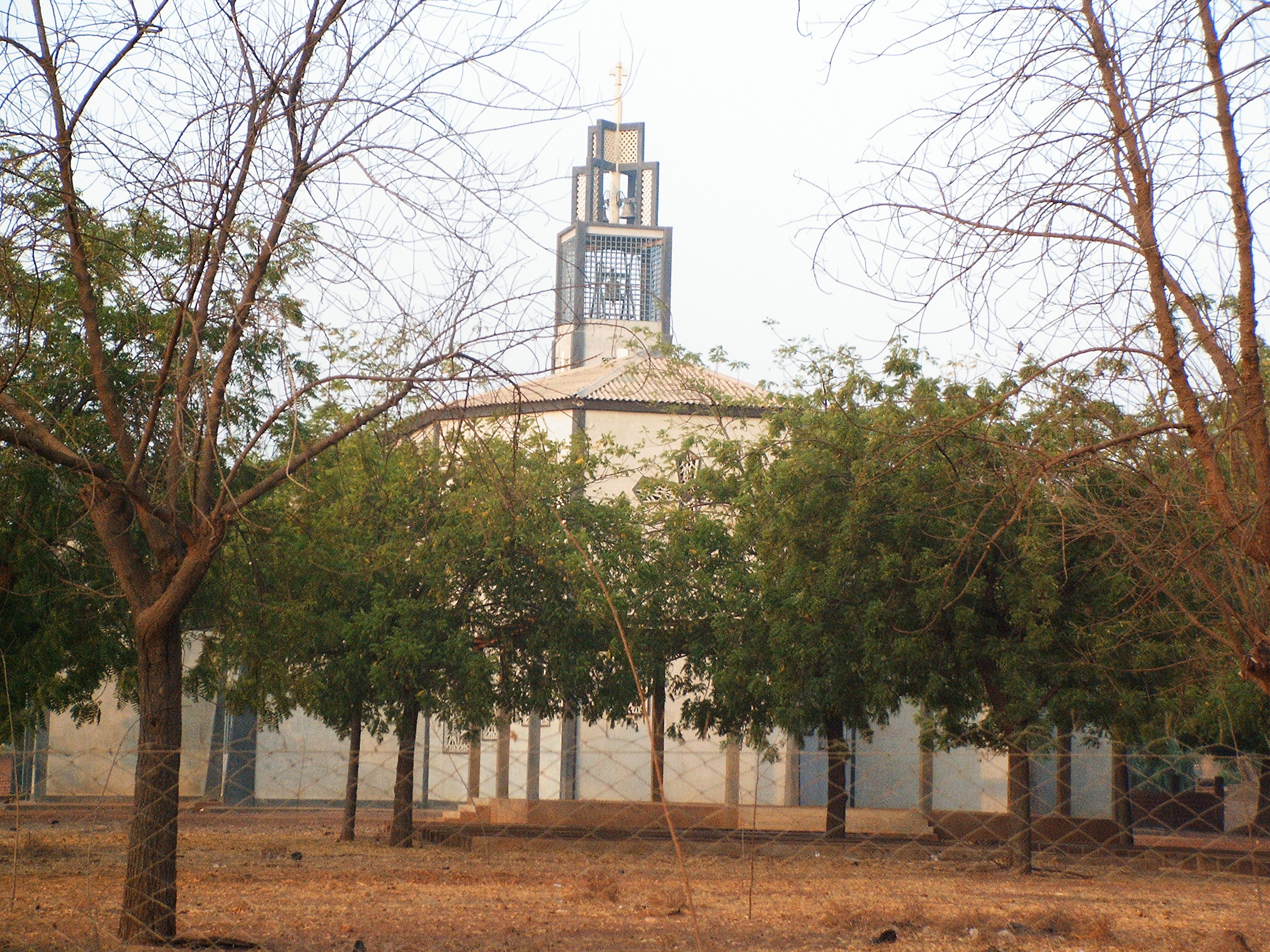
- Nouna Catholic Church

- Location within Burkina Faso, West Africa
- Coordinates: 12°44′N 3°52′W
- Country: Burkina Faso
- Region: Boucle du Mouhoun Region
- Province: Kossi Province
- Department: Nouna Department

Population (2019 census)
  - Total: 32,428
- Time zone: UTC+0 (GMT)

Nouna is a town, with a population of 32,428 (2019), located in the Province of Kossi in Burkina Faso. It is the capital of the Province. Nouna is a fairly developed town that boasts electricity, running water, land-line telephones, and cellular phones. It also has a high school, bank, post office, mayor's office, and several hotels.

According to the legend, the town of Nouna was founded by an elder of the Dafin ethnic group, who having spotted a water source in the wilderness, exclaimed "N'nouna diara!" (I am happy!), and that is how the place came to be called "Nouna".

Nouna is located on the line of separation between Samo (or Samogo) territory to the east and Dafin territory to the west. Its inhabitants are mostly Dafin, with a sizable minority of Samo, Bobo, and Fulani (French: Peul or Peulh; Fula: Fulɓe). There are also some Mossi (the majority tribe in the country) and a few other minorities. The dominant language is the Dioula language, which belongs to the same family as the Dafin.

Nouna's main street, which runs through the town from east to west, goes to the second largest city in the country, Bobo-Dioulasso, in both directions.

== 2022 massacre ==
On the night between December 29 and 30, 2022, armed men belonging to Jama'at Nasr al-Islam wal Muslimin attacked the headquarters of the VDP stationed in Nouna. In response, dozo hunters affiliated with the VDP moved into the Sector 4 and Sector 6 neighborhoods, which were predominantly Fulani. On the night of December 30, the dozos went door-to door, killing all men over the age of 16. A report from the Collective Against Impunity and the Stigmatization of Communities, a Burkinabe rights group, stated that the dozos sought out "influential" Fulani civilians. The dozos later returned to loot the houses of the civilians they killed.
