= Archdiocese of Bobo-Dioulasso =

Roman Catholic archdiocese in Burkina Faso

Coordinates: 11.1781°N 4.3030°W

Archdiocese of Bobo-Dioulasso Archidioecesis Bobodiulassensis

Location
- Country: Burkina Faso
- Headquarters: Bobo-Dioulasso

Statistics
- Area: 24,415 km^{2} (9,427 sq mi)
- Population: Total; Catholics: (as of 2023); 2,116,740; 225,790 (10.7%)
- Parishes: 22

Information
- Denomination: Catholic Church
- Sui iuris church: Latin Church
- Rite: Roman Rite
- Established: 15 December 1927; 98 years ago
- Cathedral: Cathedral of Our Lady of Lourdes of Bobo-Dioulasso

Current leadership
- Pope: Leo XIV
- Metropolitan Archbishop: Laurent Birfuoré Dabiré
- Bishops emeritus: Paul Yemboaro Ouédraogo; Anselme Titiama Sanou

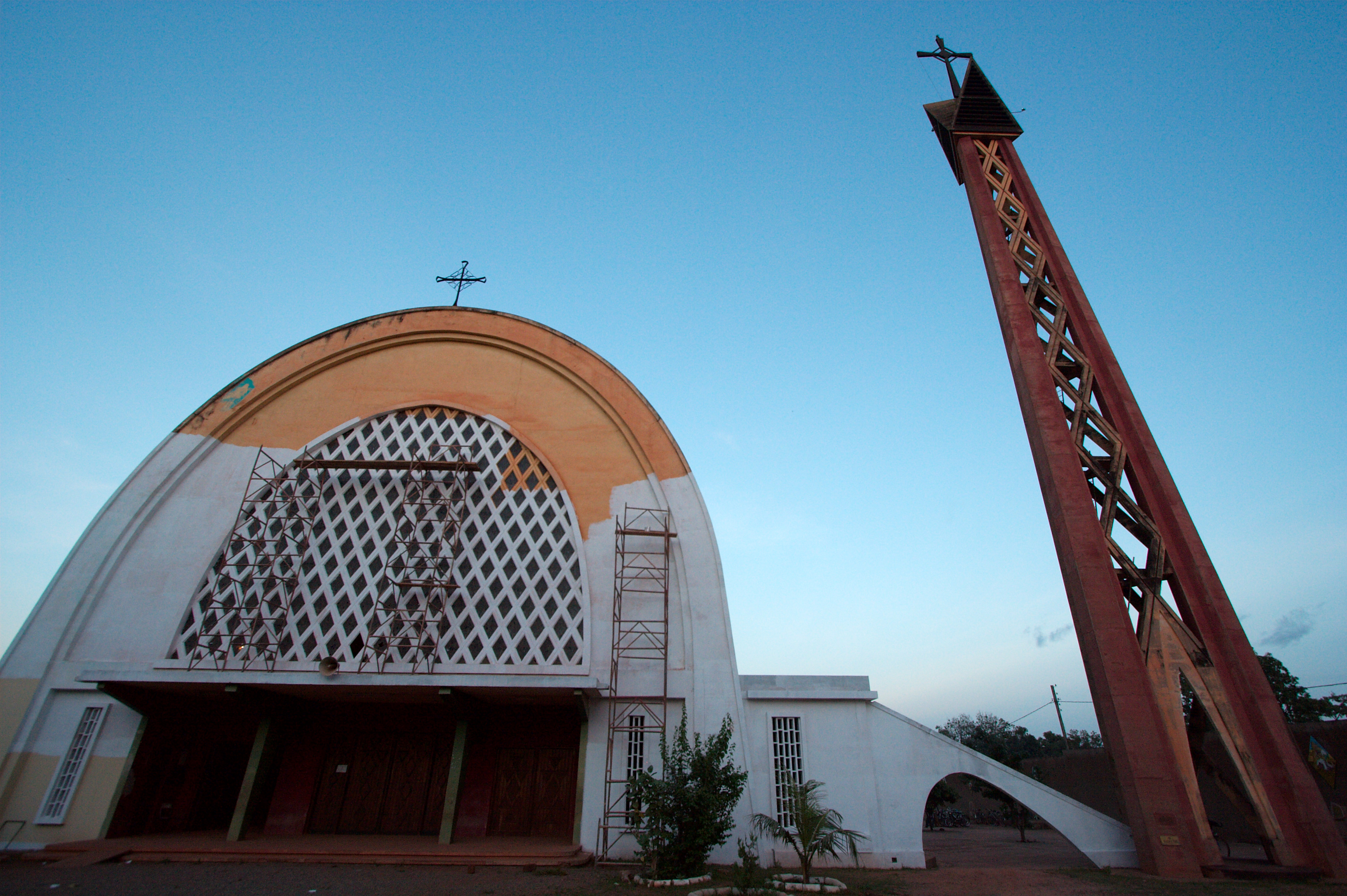
The Our Lady of Lourdes Cathedral in Bobo-Dioulasso

The Archdiocese of Bobo-Dioulasso (Latin: Archidioecesis Bobodiulassensis) is the Metropolitan See for the ecclesiastical province of Bobo-Dioulasso in Burkina Faso.

== History ==
- 15 December 1927: Established as Apostolic Prefecture of Bobo-Dioulasso from the Apostolic Vicariate of Bamako, Mali and the Apostolic Vicariate of Ouagadougou
- 9 March 1937: Promoted as Apostolic Vicariate of Bobo-Dioulasso
- 14 September 1955: Promoted as Diocese of Bobo-Dioulasso
- 5 December 2000: Promoted as Metropolitan Archdiocese of Bobo-Dioulasso

== Special churches ==
The seat of the archbishop is Cathédrale Notre Dame de Lourdes in Bobo Dioulasso.

== Bishops ==
=== Ordinaries, in reverse chronological order ===
- Metropolitan Archbishops of Bobo-Dioulasso (Roman rite), below
  - Archbishop Laurent Birfuoré Dabiré: Since 18 December 2024
  - Archbishop Paul Yemboaro Ouédraogo: 13 November 2010 – 18 December 2024, retied
  - Archbishop Anselme Titianma Sanou: 5 December 2000 – 13 November 2010; see below, resigned
- Bishops of Bobo-Dioulasso (Roman rite), below
  - Bishop Anselme Titianma Sanou: 12 December 1974 – 5 December 2000: see above
  - Bishop André-Joseph-Prosper Dupont, M. Afr.: 14 September 1955 – 12 December 1974; see below, resigned
- Vicars Apostolic of Bobo-Dioulasso (Roman rite), below
  - Bishop André-Joseph-Prosper Dupont, M. Afr.: 8 July 1941 – 14 September 1955; see above
  - Bishop Louis-Joseph-Ephrem Groshenry, M. Afr.: 17 June 1937 – 15 May 1941, resigned
- Prefects Apostolic of Bobo-Dioulasso (Roman rite), below
  - Father Marcel Paternôt, M. Afr.: 26 October 1934 - 1937, resigned
  - Father Césaire-Jean-Hippolyte Esquerre, M. Afr.: 11 January 1928 – 18 June 1934, resigned

=== Other priests of this diocese who became bishops ===
- Jean-Baptiste Kpiéle Somé, appointed Bishop of Diébougou in 1968
- Lucas Kalfa Sanou, appointed Bishop of Banfora in 1998
- Guy Mukasa Sanon, appointed Bishop of Nouna in 2025

== Suffragan Dioceses ==
- Banfora
- Dédougou
- Diébougou
- Gaoua
- Nouna

== See also ==
- List of Roman Catholic dioceses in Burkina Faso

== Sources ==
- GCatholic.org
