= Jean-Baptiste Kpiéle Somé =

Burkinabé Roman Catholic bishop (born 1930)

The Most Reverend Jean-Baptiste Kpiéle Somé
- Bishop Emeritus of Diébougou
- Church: Catholic Church
- Diocese: Diocese of Diébougou
- Appointed: 18 October 1968
- Term ended: 3 April 2006
- Predecessor: Diocese established
- Successor: Raphaël Dabiré Kusiélé

Orders
- Ordination: 11 April 1958
- Consecration: 18 January 1969

Personal details
- Born: September 1930 (age 96) Dano, French Upper Volta (now Burkina Faso)
- Denomination: Roman Catholic
- Motto: Par Lui, avec Lui et en Lui

Jean-Baptiste Kpiéle Somé (born September 1930) is a Burkinabé Roman Catholic prelate, who served as the first bishop of the Diocese of Diébougou from 1968 until his retirement in 2006.

== Early life and priesthood ==
Jean-Baptiste Kpiéle Somé was born on 1 September 1930 in Dano, in what was then French Upper Volta (now Burkina Faso).

He studied at the minor seminary with the Missionaries of Africa (White Fathers). Somé was ordained a priest on 11 April 1958. He continued his studies at the University of Lyon.

== Episcopal ministry ==
On 18 October 1968, Pope Paul VI erected the Diocese of Diébougou and appointed Somé as its first bishop. He received episcopal consecration on 18 January 1969.

As founding bishop, Somé organized the pastoral structures of the new diocese, promoted vocations, and oversaw the development of parishes, schools, and social initiatives in southwestern Burkina Faso. During his long episcopate, the diocese experienced significant growth.

On 3 April 2006, Pope Benedict XVI accepted his resignation from the pastoral governance of the Diocese of Diébougou upon reaching the canonical retirement age. He was succeeded by Raphaël Dabiré Kusiélé.

== Later life ==
After his retirement, Somé became Bishop Emeritus of Diébougou. In 2019, he celebrated the 50th anniversary of his episcopal consecration, marking five decades of episcopal ministry in Burkina Faso.
