= Bernadette Sanou Dao =

Burkinabé author and politician

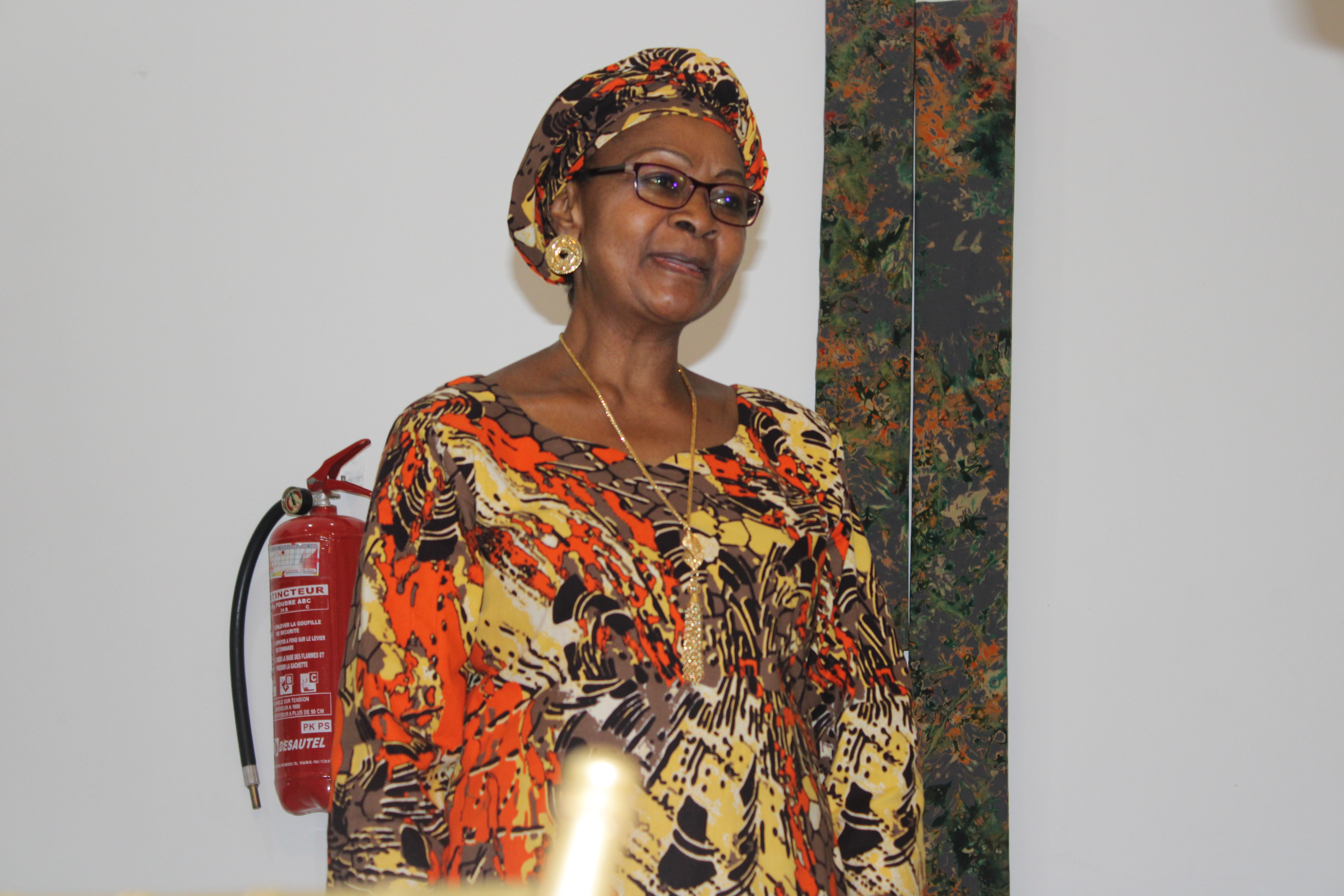
- Born: 25 February 1952 (age 74); Bamako, French Sudan
- Education: Ohio University
- Occupations: author and politician
- Known for: Poetry, short-stories and children's stories

Bernadette Sanou Dao (born 25 February 1952 in Bamako, French Sudan) is a Burkinabé author and politician. At age 11, her family returned to Upper Volta from Mali. She attended Kolog-Naba college in Ouagadougou and later Ohio University in the United States and the Sorbonne in Paris, France. From 1986 to 1987, she was Burkina Faso's Minister for Culture. She lives in Ouagadougou. She writes poetry, short stories, and children's stories.
