= Angèle Bassolé-Ouédraogo =

Canadian writer

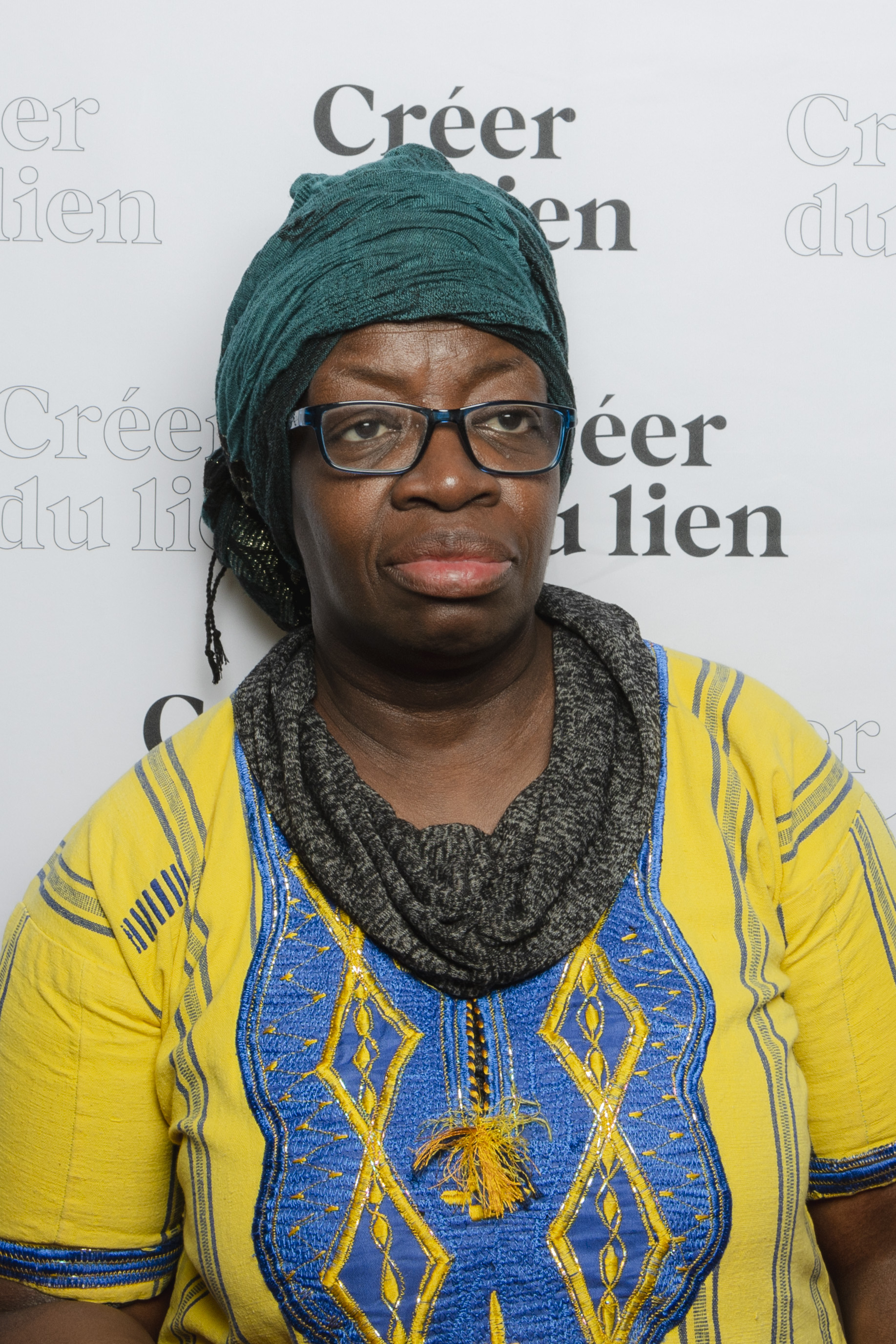
- Born: February 8, 1967 (age 59); Abidjan, Côte d'Ivoire
- Occupations: poet, journalist

Angèle Bassolé-Ouédraogo (born 8 February 1967) is an Ivoirian-born Canadian poet and journalist. She has won the Trillium Book Award and been nominated for the Ottawa Book Award.

== Early life ==
She was born in Abidjan, Côte d'Ivoire, and raised in Upper Volta. She was an avid reader as a child, and was encouraged by her local librarian who eventually taught her as his assistant, which allowed her access to more books than she would normally be allowed. She wrote her first poem around the age of 11 to 12, after being influenced by her brother Francis, who would go on to be a well known poet in Côte d'Ivoire. Her first published work was about Nelson Mandela while he was still imprisoned in South Africa, which was published by Jeune Afrique in France when she was 16.

== Education ==
She studied at the University of Ouagadougou and subsequently moved to Canada after she received a grant to do so, receiving a doctorate from the University of Ottawa and a journalism degree from the Université de Montréal. She is currently a researcher in women's studies at the University of Ottawa, and is developing a project to bring women's studies to African-based universities.

== Career and Recognition ==
Her 2003 book Avec tes mots won the Trillium Book Award for French-language poetry, while Sahéliennes was nominated for the Ottawa Book Award in 2008 and was her first work to be translated into Portuguese. Between 2009 and 2012, she worked as an advisor in Burkina Faso on equal rights for men and women. She has created her own publishing house in Canada, Éditions Malaïka, which she aims to use to concentrate on African themes.

== Bibliography ==
- Burkina blues. Brossard, Québec: Humanitas. 2000. ISBN 2-89396-196-7.
- Avec tes mots. Ottawa: Malaïka. 2003. ISBN 2-913991-23-8.
- Sahéliennes. Ottawa: L'Interligne. 2006. ISBN 2-923274-10-5.
- Les Porteuses d'Afrique. Ottawa: L'Interligne. 2007. ISBN 978-2-923274-23-2.
- Mulheres Do Sahel. Portugal: Europress. 2007.
- Yennenga. Ottawa: L'Interligne. 2012.
