= Jean-Marie Untaani Compaoré =

Burkinabè Roman Catholic archbishop (1933–2024)

His Excellency Jean-Marie Untaani Compaoré
- Archbishop Emeritus of Ouagadougou
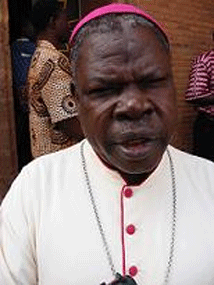
- Untaani Compaoré in 2011
- Archdiocese: Ouagadougou
- Appointed: 10 June 1995
- Term ended: 13 May 2009
- Predecessor: First
- Successor: Philippe Ouédraogo
- Previous posts: Auxiliary Bishop of Ouagadougou and Titular Bishop of Lamzella (1973–1979); Bishop of Fada N'Gourma (1979–1995)

Orders
- Ordination: 8 September 1962
- Consecration: 28 October 1973 by Paul Zoungrana

Personal details
- Born: 29 July 1933 Saganyônyôgo, French Upper Volta, French West Africa
- Died: 9 November 2024 (aged 91) Ouagadougou, Burkina Faso
- Motto: Collaborantes fidei Evangelii (Struggling together for the faith of the gospel)

Jean-Marie Untaani Compaoré (29 July 1933 – 9 November 2024) was a Burkinabè Roman Catholic prelate, auxiliary bishop of Ouagadougou (1973–1979), bishop of Fada N'Gourma (1979–1995) and archbishop of Ouagadougou (1995–2009). Untaani Compaore died in Ouagadougou, Burkina Faso on 9 November 2024, at the age of 91.

Catholic Church titles
| Preceded by First | Archbishop of Ouagadougou; 1995–2009 | Succeeded by Philippe Ouédraogo |
| Preceded by Marcel Pierre Marie Chauvin | Bishop of Fada N’Gourma; 1979–1995 | Succeeded by Paul Yemboaro Ouédraogo |
| Preceded by Edward John Herrmann | Titular Bishop of Lamzella; 1973–1979 | Succeeded by Jean-Louis Plouffe |
| Preceded by — | Auxiliary Bishop of Ouagadougou; 1973–1979 | Succeeded by — |
