= Outline of Burkina Faso =

Landlocked country in West Africa

The Flag of Burkina Faso

The Coat of arms of Burkina Faso

The location of Burkina Faso

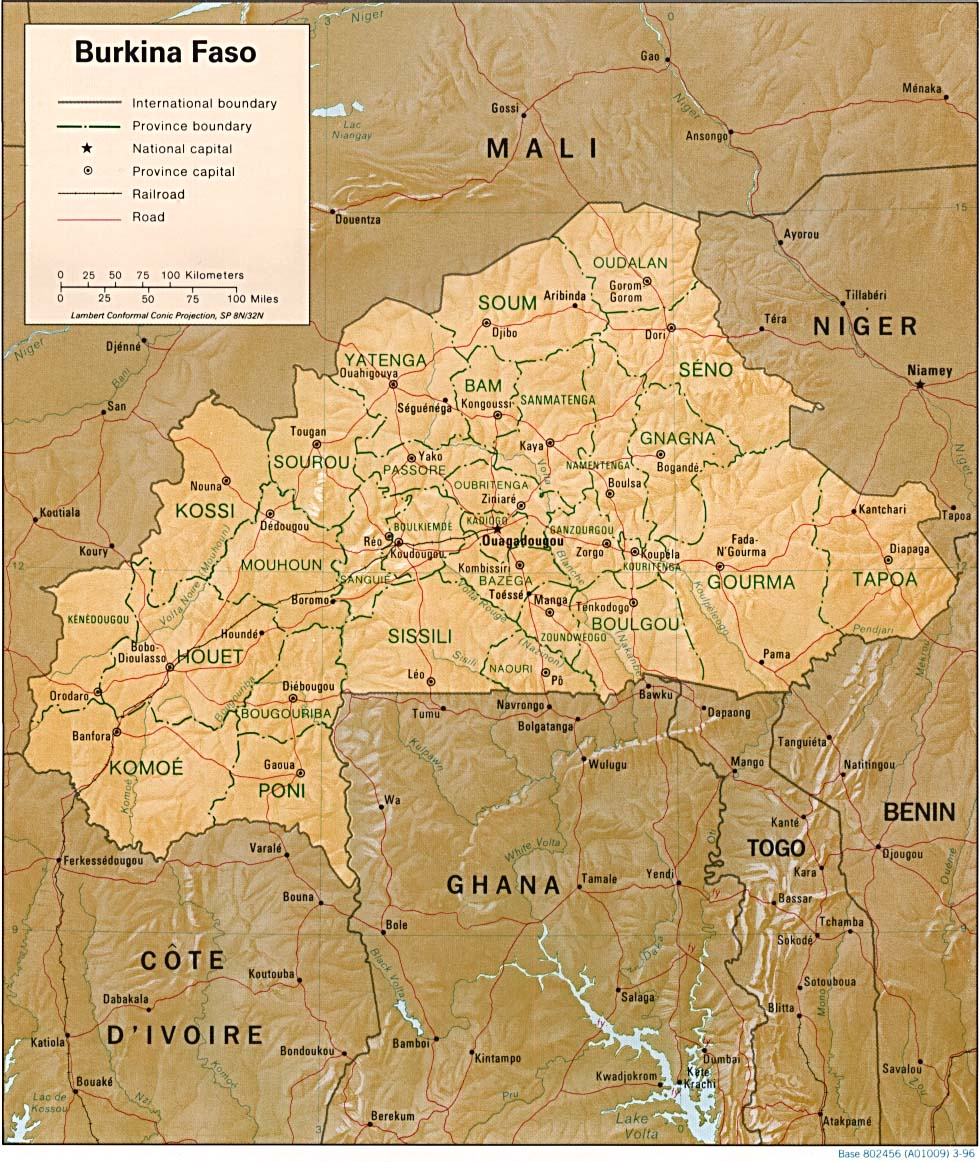
An enlargeable relief map of Burkina Faso

The following outline is provided as an overview of and topical guide to Burkina Faso:

Burkina Faso – landlocked sovereign country located in West Africa. It is surrounded by six countries: Mali to the north, Niger to the east, Benin to the south east, Togo, Ghana to the south, and Côte d'Ivoire to the south west. Formerly called the Republic of Upper Volta, it was renamed on August 4, 1984, by President Thomas Sankara to mean "the land of upright people" in Mooré and Dioula, the major native languages of the country. Literally, "Burkina" may be translated, "men of integrity," from the Moré language, and "Faso" means "father's house" in Dioula.

== General reference ==
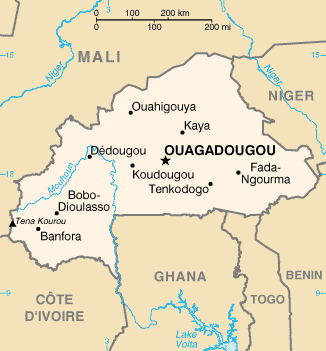
An enlargeable basic map of Burkina Faso

- Pronunciation: English: /bərˌkiːnə ˈfɑːsoʊ/; French: [buʁkina faso]
- Common English country name: Burkina Faso
- Official English country name: Burkina Faso
- Official language: French
- Common endonym(s): le Burkina, le Faso
- Official endonym(s): le Faso
- Adjectival(s): Burkinabe
- Demonym(s): Burkinabe
- International rankings of Burkina Faso
- ISO country codes: BF, BFA, 854
- ISO region codes: See ISO 3166-2:BF
- Internet country code top-level domain: .bf

== Geography of Burkina Faso ==
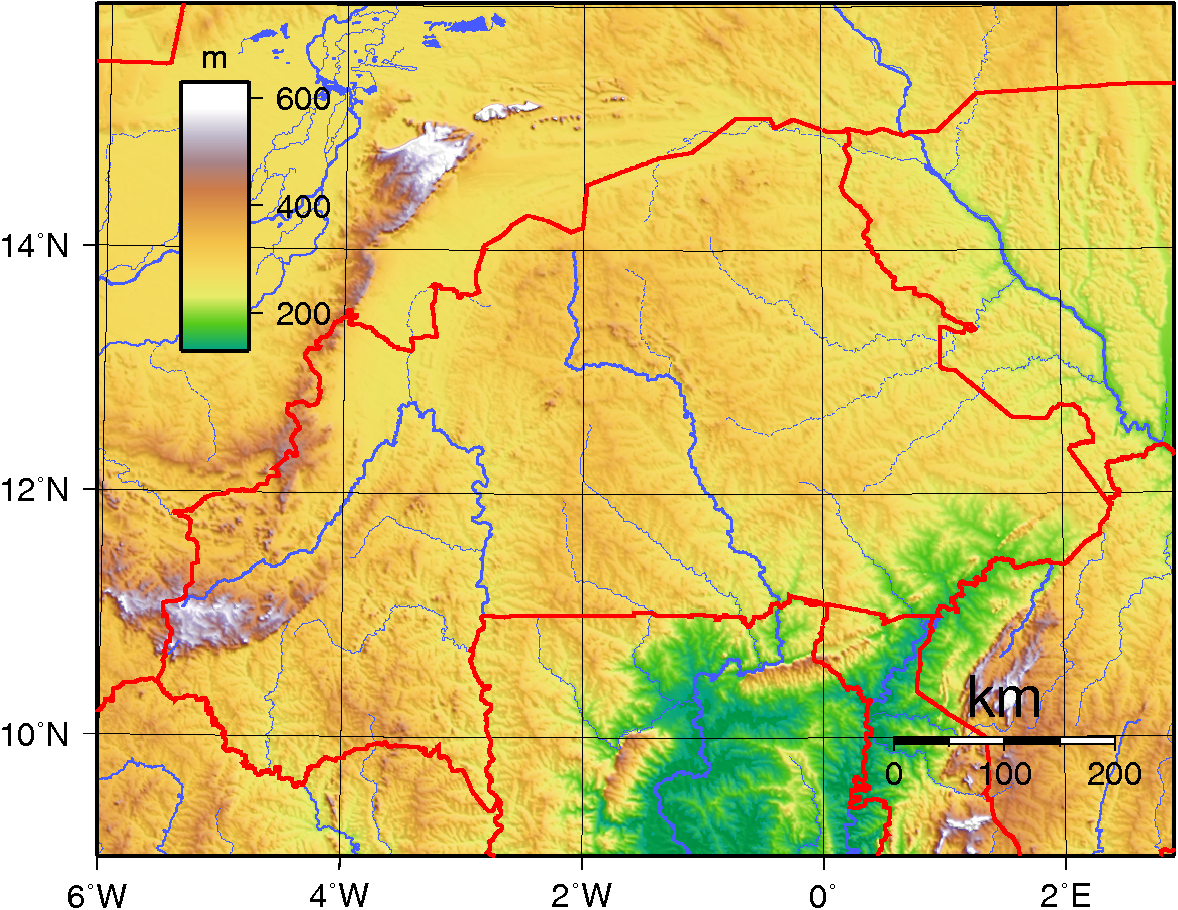
An enlargeable topographic map of Burkina Faso

- Burkina Faso is: a landlocked country
- Population of Burkina Faso: 13,228,000(2005) - 68th most populous country
- Area of Burkina Faso: 274,000 square kilometres (106,000 sq mi) - 74th largest country
- Atlas of Burkina Faso

=== Location ===
- Burkina Faso is situated within the following regions:
  - Northern Hemisphere and lies on the Prime Meridian
    - Africa
      - West Africa
- Time zone: Coordinated Universal Time UTC+00
- Extreme points of Burkina Faso
  - High: Tena Kourou 749 m (2,457 ft)
  - Low: Black Volta 200 m (656 ft)
- Land boundaries: 3,193 km

Mali 1,000 km
Niger 628 km
Cote d'Ivoire 584 km
Ghana 549 km
Benin 306 km
Togo 126 km

- Coastline: none

=== Environment of Burkina Faso ===
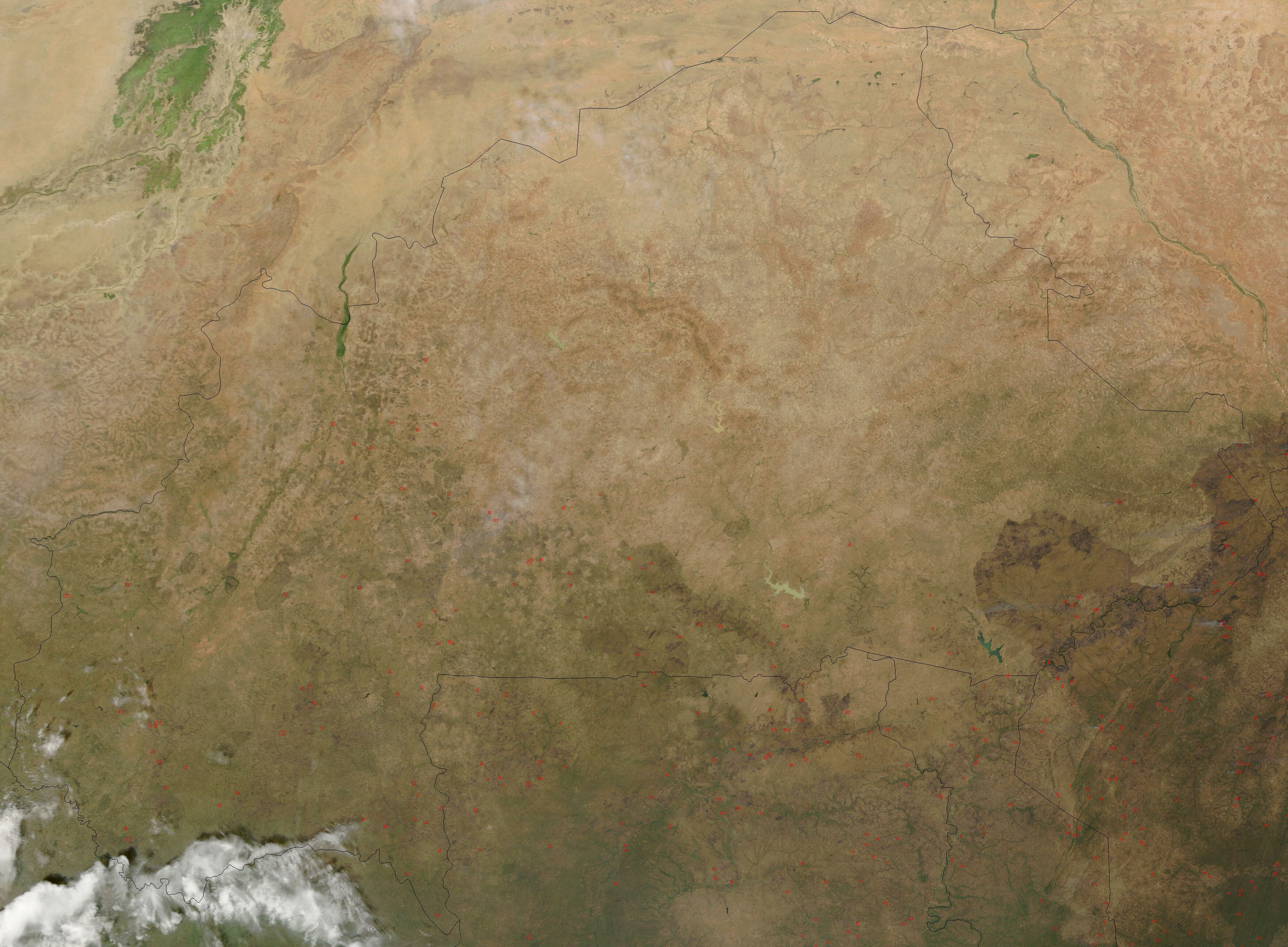
An enlargeable satellite image of Burkina Faso

- Climate of Burkina Faso
- Protected areas of Burkina Faso
  - National parks of Burkina Faso
- Wildlife of Burkina Faso
  - Fauna of Burkina Faso
    - Birds of Burkina Faso
    - Mammals of Burkina Faso

==== Natural geographic features of Burkina Faso ====
- Glaciers in Burkina Faso: none
- Lakes of Burkina Faso
- Rivers of Burkina Faso
- World Heritage Sites in Burkina Faso: The Ruins of Loropéni

==== Administrative divisions of Burkina Faso ====
- Regions of Burkina Faso
  - Provinces of Burkina Faso
    - Departments of Burkina Faso

===== Regions of Burkina Faso =====
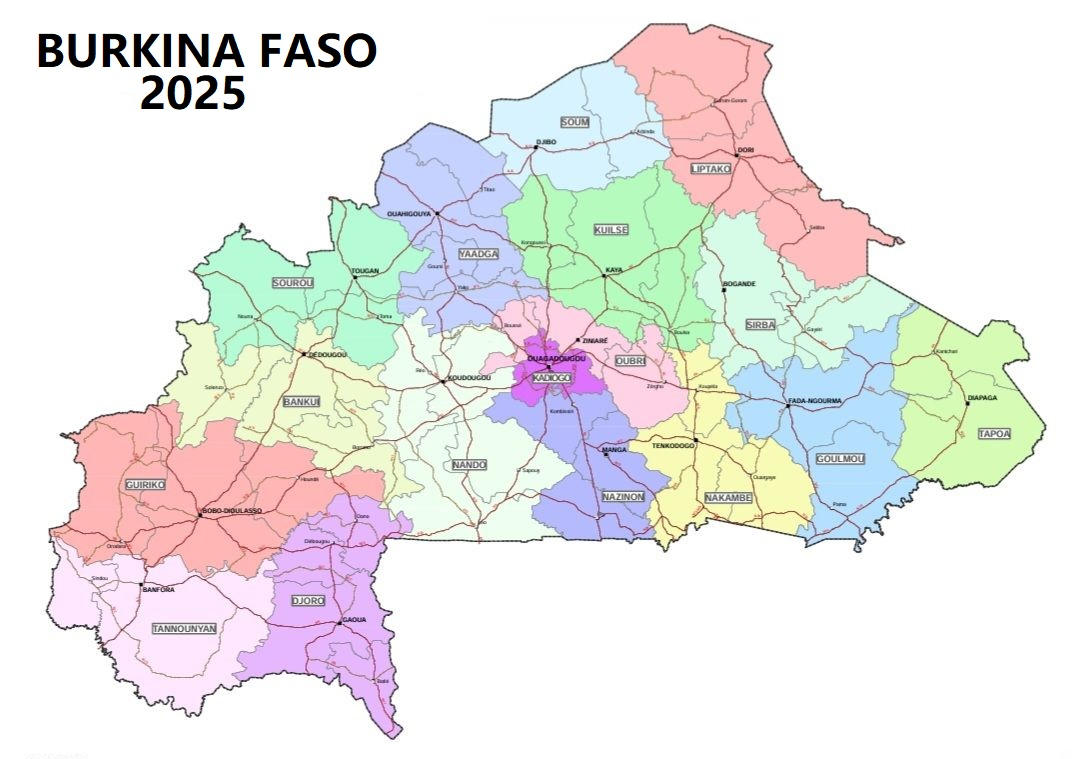
Map of Burkina Faso (since 2025)

Region N
Bankui
Djôrô
Goulmou
Guiriko
Kadiogo
Kuilsé
Liptako
Nakambé
Nando
Nazinon
Oubri
Sirba
Soum
Sourou
Tannounyan
Tapoa
Yaadga

===== Provinces of Burkina Faso =====
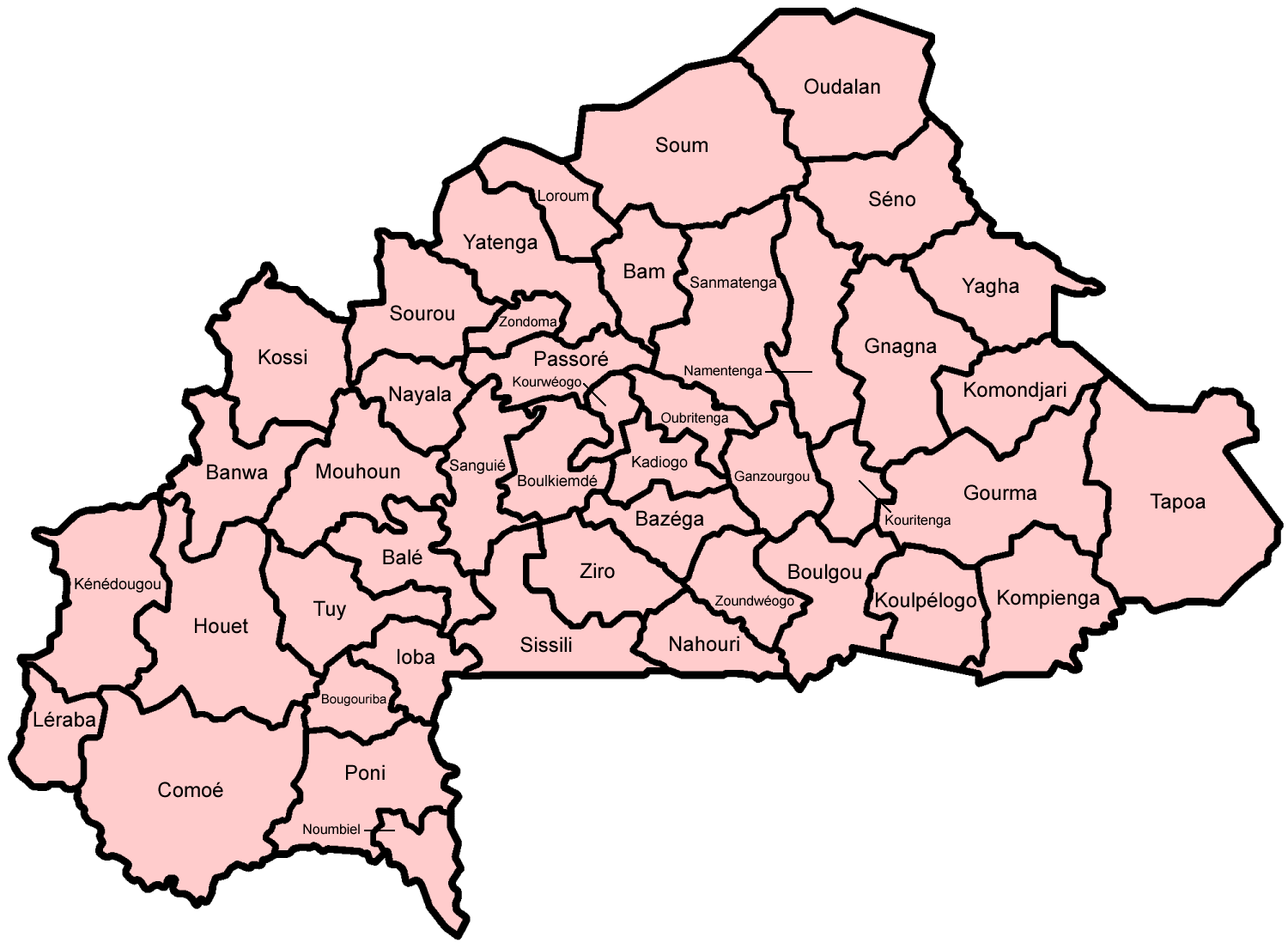
Provinces of Burkina Faso with names

===== Departments of Burkina Faso =====
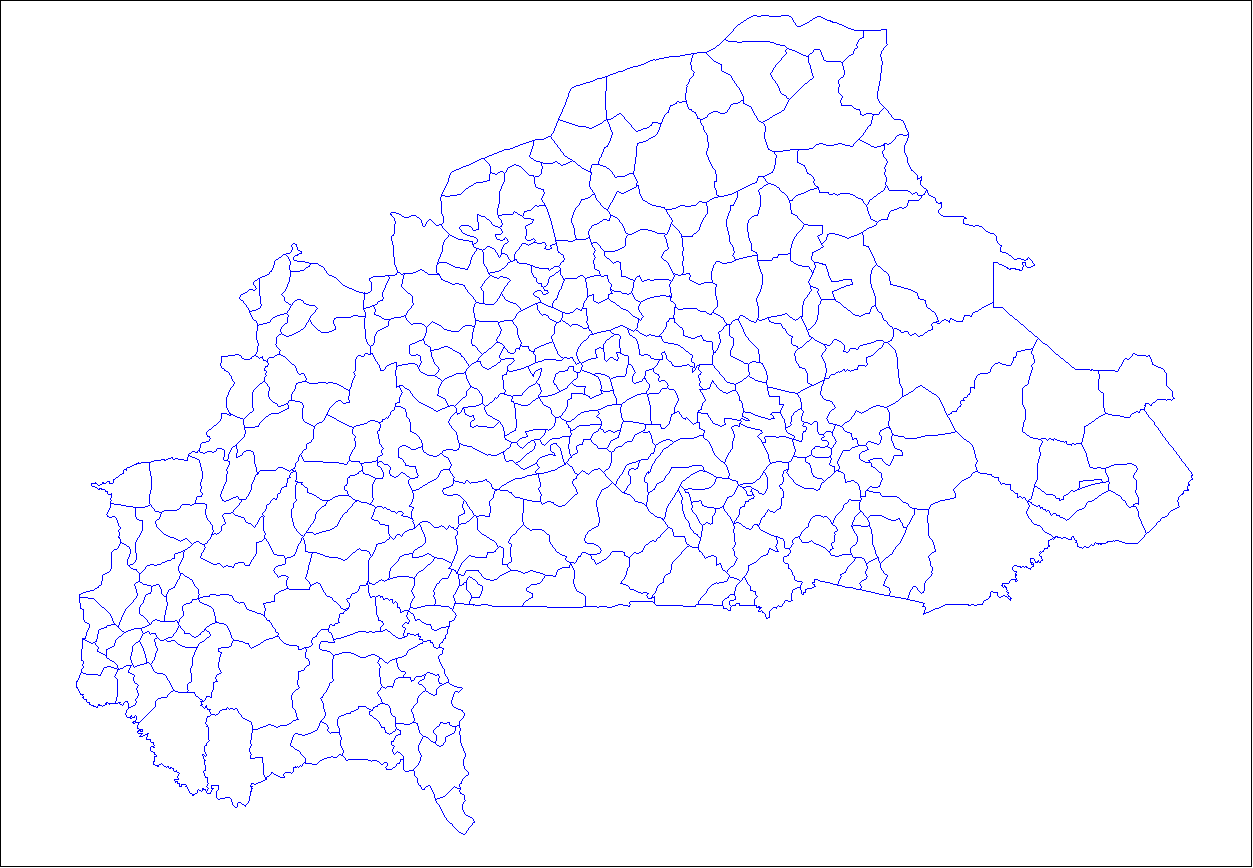
The 351 departments (or communes) of Burkina Faso.

- Capital of Burkina Faso: Ouagadougou
- Cities of Burkina Faso

=== Demography of Burkina Faso ===
Demographics of Burkina Faso

== Government and politics of Burkina Faso ==
Politics of Burkina Faso

- Form of government: presidential republic
- Capital of Burkina Faso: Ouagadougou
- Elections in Burkina Faso
- Political parties in Burkina Faso

=== Branches of government ===
Government of Burkina Faso

==== Executive branch of the government of Burkina Faso ====
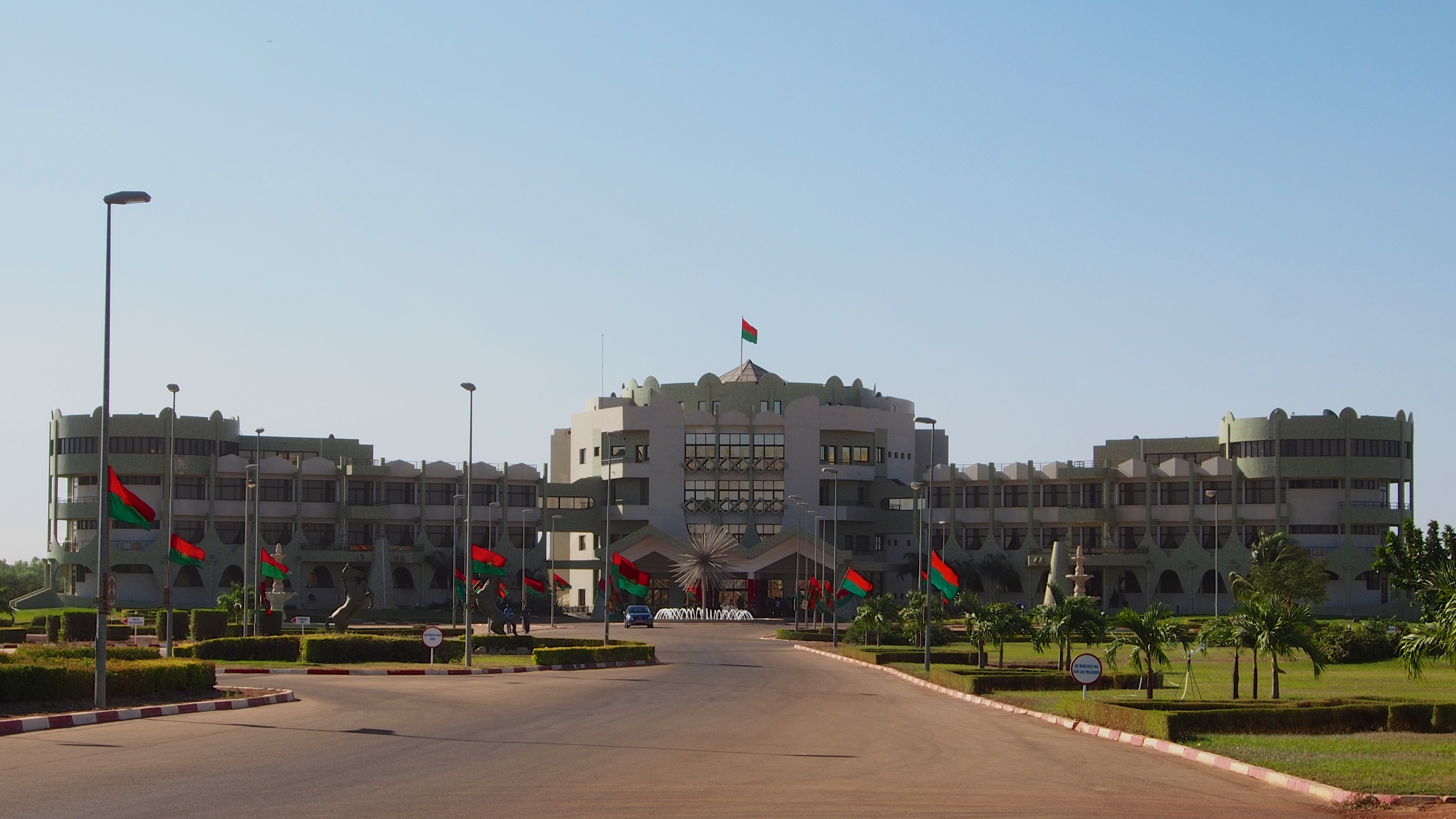
Palais_Kossyam_2013

- Head of state: President of Burkina Faso
- Head of government: Prime Minister of Burkina Faso

==== Legislative branch of the government of Burkina Faso ====
- National Assembly of Burkina Faso (unicameral)

=== Foreign relations of Burkina Faso ===
- Diplomatic missions in Burkina Faso
- Diplomatic missions of Burkina Faso

==== International organization membership ====
Burkina Faso is a member of:

- Alliance of Sahel States (AES)
- African, Caribbean, and Pacific Group of States (ACP)
- African Development Bank Group (AfDB)
- African Union (AU) (Suspended)
- African Union/United Nations Hybrid operation in Darfur (UNAMID)
- Conference des Ministres des Finances des Pays de la Zone Franc (FZ)
- Council of the Entente (Entente)
- Economic Community of West African States (ECOWAS) (Suspended)
- Food and Agriculture Organization (FAO)
- Group of 77 (G77)
- International Atomic Energy Agency (IAEA)
- International Bank for Reconstruction and Development (IBRD)
- International Chamber of Commerce (ICC)
- International Civil Aviation Organization (ICAO)
- International Criminal Court (ICCt)
- International Criminal Police Organization (Interpol)
- International Development Association (IDA)
- International Federation of Red Cross and Red Crescent Societies (IFRCS)
- International Finance Corporation (IFC)
- International Fund for Agricultural Development (IFAD)
- International Labour Organization (ILO)
- International Monetary Fund (IMF)
- International Olympic Committee (IOC)
- International Organization for Migration (IOM)
- International Organization for Standardization (ISO) (correspondent)
- International Red Cross and Red Crescent Movement (ICRM)
- International Telecommunication Union (ITU)
- International Telecommunications Satellite Organization (ITSO)
- International Trade Union Confederation (ITUC)
- Inter-Parliamentary Union (IPU)
- Islamic Development Bank (IDB)
- Multilateral Investment Guarantee Agency (MIGA)
- Nonaligned Movement (NAM)
- Organisation internationale de la Francophonie (OIF)
- Organisation of Islamic Cooperation (OIC)
- Organisation for the Prohibition of Chemical Weapons (OPCW)
- Permanent Court of Arbitration (PCA)
- United Nations (UN)
- United Nations Conference on Trade and Development (UNCTAD)
- United Nations Educational, Scientific, and Cultural Organization (UNESCO)
- United Nations Industrial Development Organization (UNIDO)
- United Nations Institute for Training and Research (UNITAR)
- United Nations Mission in the Sudan (UNMIS)
- United Nations Operation in Cote d'Ivoire (UNOCI)
- United Nations Organization Mission in the Democratic Republic of the Congo (MONUC)
- Universal Postal Union (UPU)
- West African Development Bank (WADB) (regional)
- West African Economic and Monetary Union (WAEMU)
- World Confederation of Labour (WCL)
- World Customs Organization (WCO)
- World Federation of Trade Unions (WFTU)
- World Health Organization (WHO)
- World Intellectual Property Organization (WIPO)
- World Meteorological Organization (WMO)
- World Tourism Organization (UNWTO)
- World Trade Organization (WTO)

=== Law and order in Burkina Faso ===
- Constitution of Burkina Faso
- Human rights in Burkina Faso
  - LGBT rights in Burkina Faso
  - Freedom of religion in Burkina Faso
- Law enforcement in Burkina Faso

=== Military of Burkina Faso ===
Military of Burkina Faso

- Command
  - Commander-in-chief:
- Forces
  - Army of Burkina Faso
  - Navy of Burkina Faso: None
  - People's Militia
  - Regiment of Presidential Security

== History of Burkina Faso ==
National Heroes Memorial

== Culture of Burkina Faso ==
Traditional celebration masks in Gossina

Sculpted wooden Bwa mask

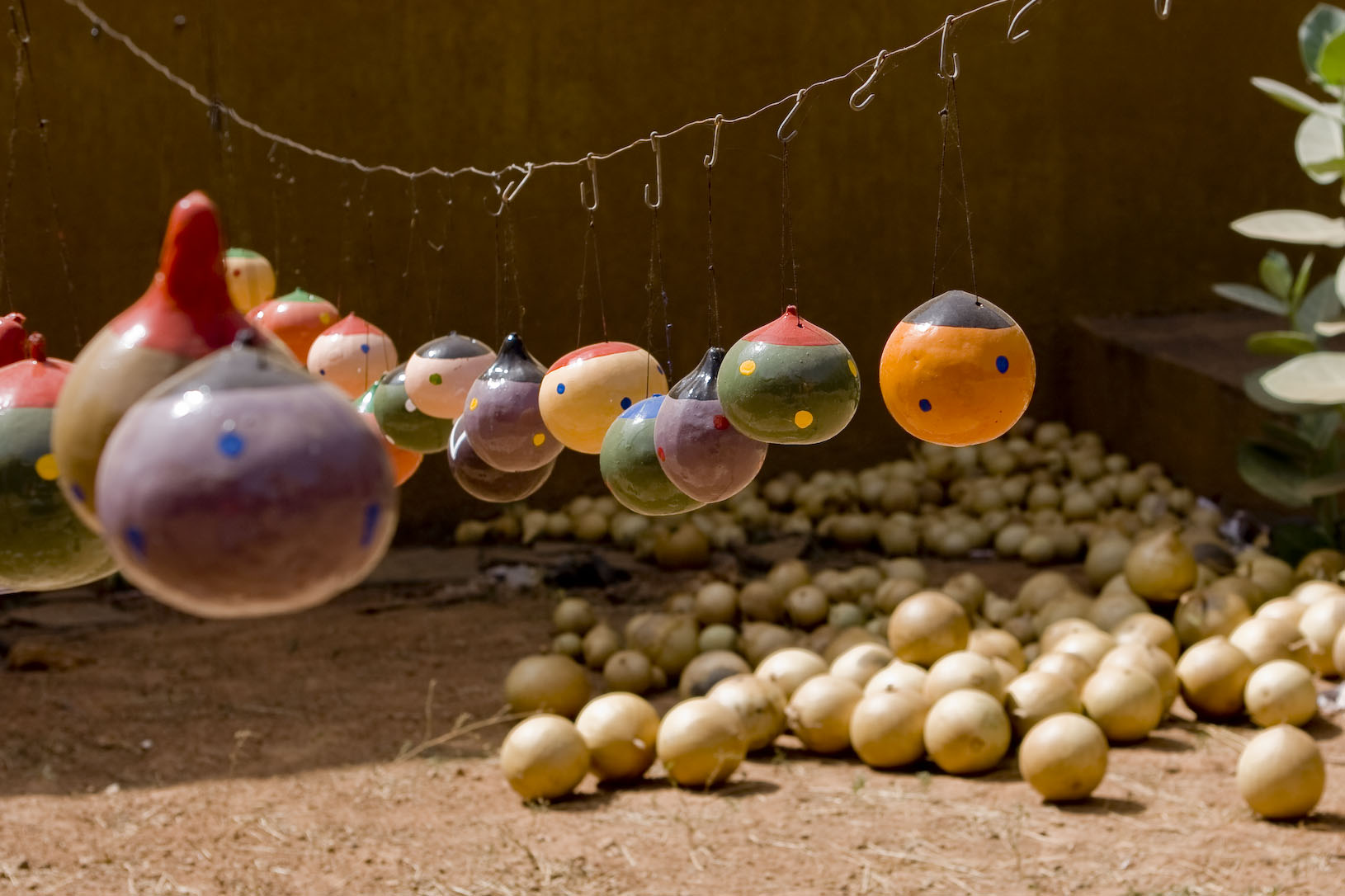
Traditional artisan painted gourds

Cultural ritual processional in Sakpani

- Cuisine of Burkina Faso
- Languages of Burkina Faso
- Media in Burkina Faso
- National symbols of Burkina Faso
  - Coat of arms of Burkina Faso
  - Flag of Burkina Faso
  - National anthem of Burkina Faso
- People of Burkina Faso
- Prostitution in Burkina Faso
- Public holidays in Burkina Faso
- Religion in Burkina Faso
  - Christianity in Burkina Faso
  - Islam in Burkina Faso
    - Ahmadiyya in Burkina Faso
- World Heritage Sites in Burkina Faso: none

=== Art in Burkina Faso ===
- Cinema of Burkina Faso
- Literature of Burkina Faso
- Music of Burkina Faso
- Theatre in Burkina Faso

=== Sports in Burkina Faso ===
Sports in Burkina Faso

- Football in Burkina Faso
- Burkina Faso at the Olympics

== Economy and infrastructure of Burkina Faso ==
Economy of Burkina Faso

- Economic rank, by nominal GDP (2007): 129th (one hundred and twenty ninth)
- Agriculture in Burkina Faso
- Communications in Burkina Faso
  - Internet in Burkina Faso
- Currency of Burkina Faso: Franc
  - ISO 4217: XOF
- Energy in Burkina Faso
- Mining in Burkina Faso
- Stock Exchange in Burkino Faso: none – served by the regional stock exchange Bourse Régionale des Valeurs Mobilières (BRVM) in Abidjan, Cote d'Ivoire.
- Tourism in Burkina Faso
- Transport in Burkina Faso
  - Airports in Burkina Faso
  - Rail transport in Burkina Faso
- Water supply and sanitation in Burkina Faso

== Education in Burkina Faso ==
Education in Burkina Faso

== Health in Burkina Faso ==
Health in Burkina Faso

== See also ==
- Burkina Faso
- List of Burkina Faso-related topics
- List of international rankings
- Member state of the United Nations
- Outline of Africa
- Outline of geography
