= Burkinabes in Nigeria =

Burkinabè in Nigeria
- (Burkina Faso) (Nigeria)

Regions with significant populations
- Lagos, Abuja, Kano, and other parts of northern and southern Nigeria

Languages
- French (African French), Mooré, Fula, Dyula, and other languages of Burkina Faso, as well as English, Nigerian Pidgin and local Nigerian languages

Religion
- Predominantly Islam and Christianity; also traditional beliefs

Burkinabés in Nigeria are residents of Nigeria who were born in Burkina Faso or are of Burkinabé descent, meaning that one or both of their parents hold Burkinabé nationality. Due to the relative geographical proximity of eastern Burkina Faso to northwestern Nigeria in the Sahel region, the two countries have historically been connected by networks of pastoralism, trade, and Islamic education, predating their current national borders. Both Nigeria and Burkina Faso share common ethnolinguistic communities, such as the Fula, Hausa, and Tuareg peoples.

== History ==
For centuries, migration and trade routes connected the Sahel with the Sahara and North Africa through the trans-Saharan trade networks, facilitating the movement of merchants, pastoralists and other populations across West Africa. Later, during the 19th century, under European colonial rule, Burkina Faso became part of the French colonial empire and was incorporated into French West Africa, before becoming the colony of Upper Volta in 1919; while Colonial Nigeria fell under British rule. This led to significant changes in migration patterns, with new borders restricting the movement of people and altering economic activities, including the recruitment of people for some types of forced labor, especially in mining and cotton cultivation.

For almost a century, between 1804 and 1903, the Sokoto Caliphate operated as an Islamic state, incorporating territories of present-day Nigeria and Burkina Faso. It was abolished by the British, who established the Northern Nigeria Protectorate, which also included territories of the Kanem–Bornu Empire.

After gaining independence from their respective European colonial powers, Burkina Faso (then known as Upper Volta) and Nigeria retained many of the regional migration and trade networks that had developed across West Africa during the colonial period. Burkina Faso became independent from France in 1960, while Nigeria gained independence from the United Kingdom in the same year. Despite the establishment of new international borders, cross-border movements of traders, pastoralists and workers continued between the two countries and within the wider West African region. Subsequent regional integration, particularly through the establishment of the Economic Community of West African States (ECOWAS) in 1975 and its protocols on the free movement of persons, further facilitated mobility between Burkina Faso, Nigeria and other member states. In 2023, Burkina Faso withdrew from the organization to form the Alliance of Sahel States, along with Niger and Mali, which means possible modifications to the legislation of Nigeria and Burkina Faso in relation to the movement of their citizens between both countries.

In the 21st century, several Burkinabè citizens have reportedly been lured to Nigeria by a migrant-trafficking network operating under the guise of network marketing, with promises of employment and visas to Europe. These victims were required to pay substantial sums of money and travel to Nigeria, where they discovered that they had been deceived. However, Burkinabe diplomatic authorities have worked jointly with Nigerian immigration authorities (Nigeria Immigration Service, NIS) to repatriate reported cases from Nigeria to Burkina Faso.

== Sociocultural organizations ==
The Association of Burkinabe Residents in Nigeria (Association des Burkinabè Résidant au Nigéria, ABRN) was legally recognized by the Federal Republic of Nigeria on 14 August 2013. Based in Lagos, the association serves as a sociocultural organization for the Burkinabè diaspora, organizing social gatherings and cultural events that promote community cohesion and preserve Burkinabè cultural traditions. Its activities have included celebrations featuring Burkinabè music, dance and cuisine, as well as events bringing together members of the community.
