= Religion in Burkina Faso =

Religion in Burkina Faso (2019 census)
1. Islam (63.8%)
2. Christianity (26.3%)
3. Traditional faiths (9.00%)
4. Others / None (0.90%)
Religion in Burkina Faso (Pew Research Center 2020)
1. Islam (67.4%)
2. Christianity (28.0%)
3. Other (4.60%)

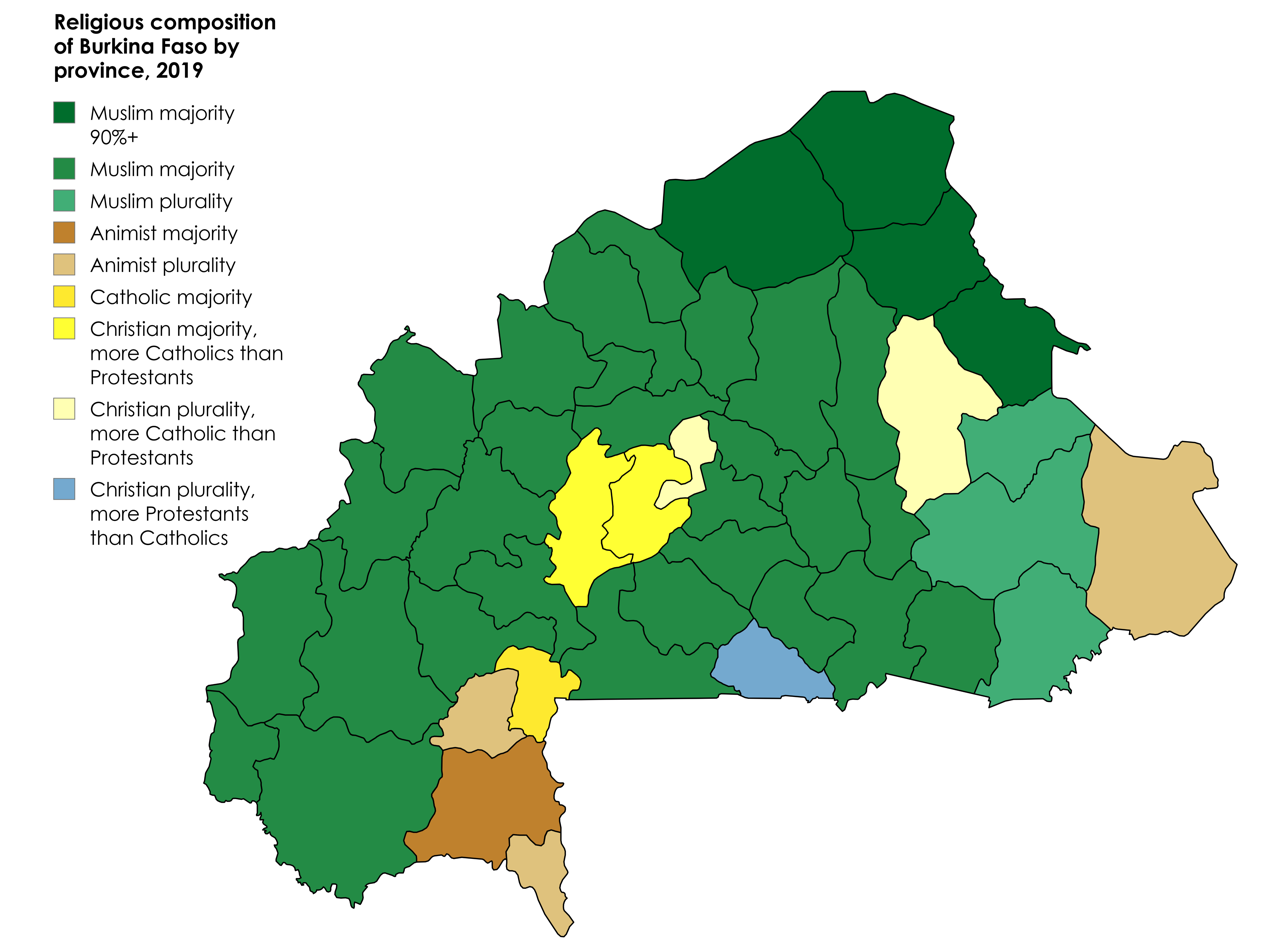
Dominant religion by province in Burkina Faso, 2019.

Burkina Faso is a religiously diverse society, with Islam being the dominant religion. According to the latest 2019 census, 63.8% of the population adheres to Islam. Around 26.3% of the population practises Christianity, 9.0% follow Animism/Folk Religion (African traditional religion), and that 0.9% are unaffiliated or follow other faiths. The vast majority of Muslims in Burkina Faso are Sunni Muslims who follow Maliki school of law, deeply influenced by Sufism. The Shi'a and Ahmadiyya branches of Islam also have a presence in the country. A significant number of Sunni Muslims identify with the Tijaniyah Sufi order.

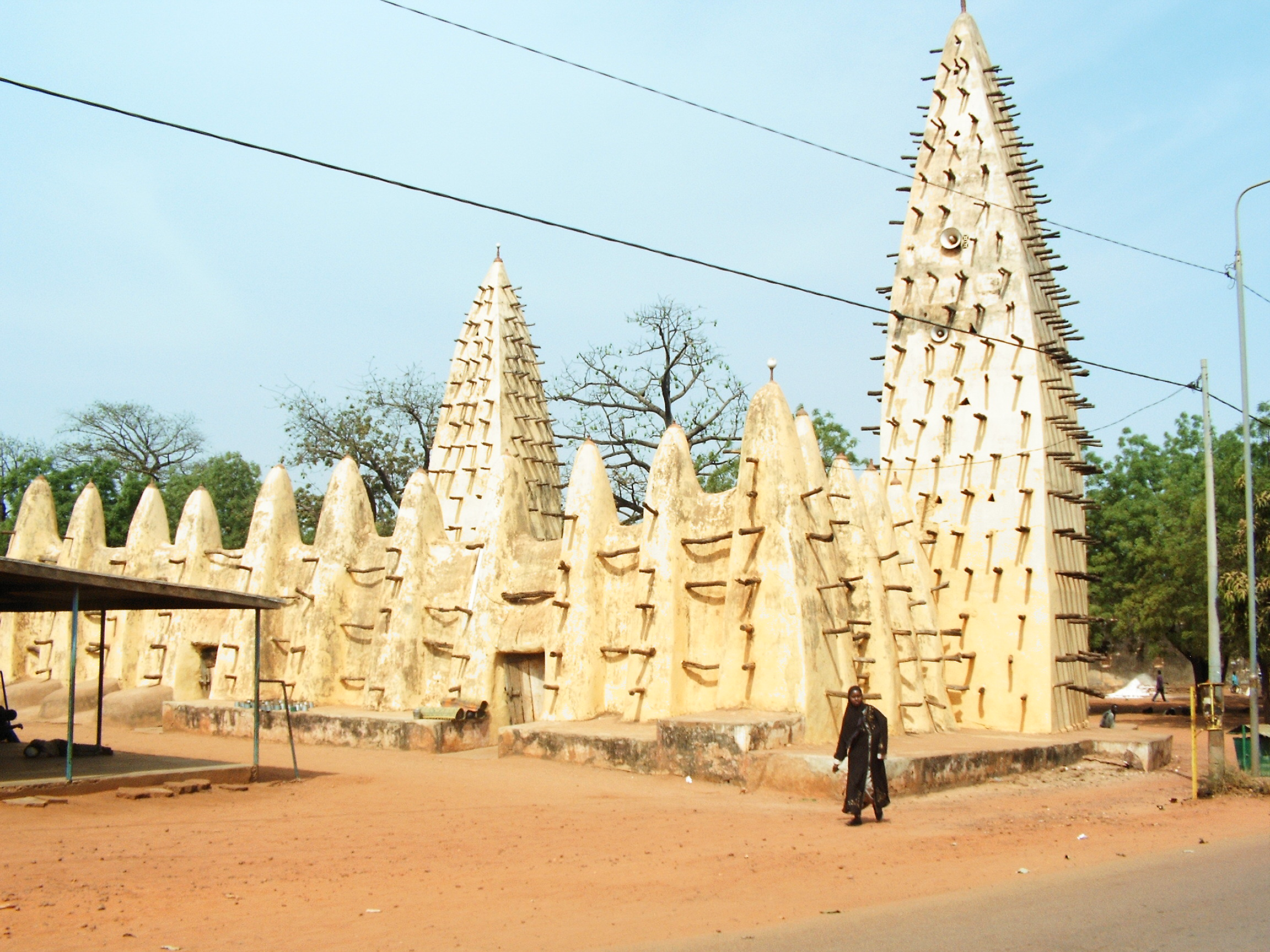
Mosque in Bobo-Dioulasso, Burkina Faso.

Since independence from France in 1960, Burkina Faso, formerly known as Upper Volta, has experienced a continuous decline in identification with traditional faiths (referred to as 'animism') alongside a simultaneous expansion of Islam and Christianity. The 1960 government survey found the majority (68.7%) of the total population identified as adherents of traditional religion, with Muslims and Christians forming minorities in the new state. The survey report noted that the country's religious composition differentiated it from neighboring Muslim-majority Mali and Niger, which were historically ruled by Islamic empires for centuries. In less than half a century, the religious landscape of Burkina Faso would see a complete reversal. Muslims rose from 27.5% of Burkinabé in 1960 to over half of the population by 1996, while Christians similarly increased from 3.8% of Burkinabe to a fifth. This shift is highly pronounced among the Mossi people, the country's largest ethnic group; the 1960 survey found only 21.9% of Mossi identified as Muslim (75.3% adhered to traditional beliefs), but around 80% are Muslim today.

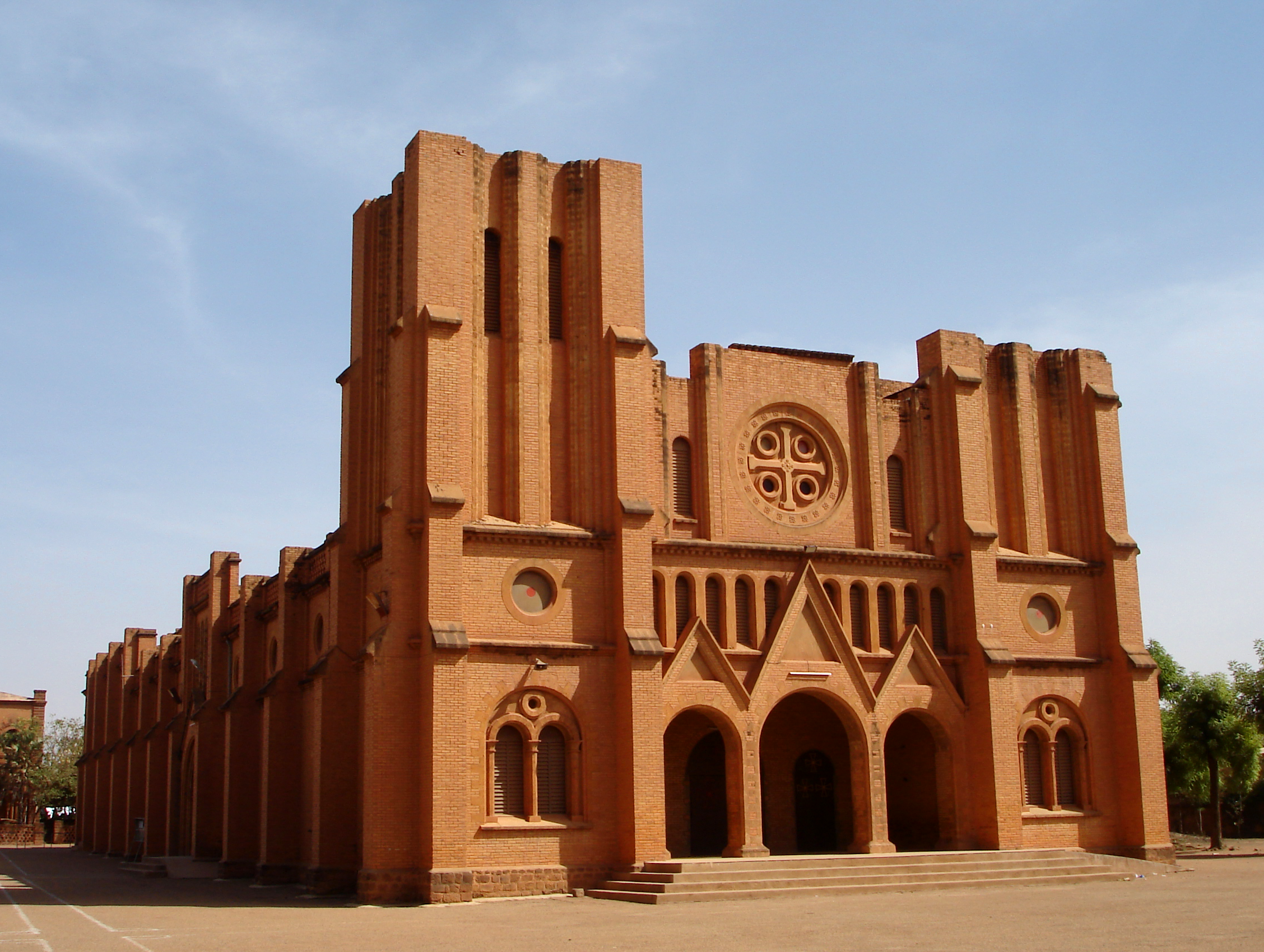
The Ouagadougou Cathedral

Legally a secular state, Burkina Faso provides for religious freedom through its constitution. Although the state is formally laic, it has traditionally subsidised private religious schools and the Hajj–the Muslim pilgrimage to Mecca. Both Islamic and Christian festivals are officially recognised as public holidays in Burkina Faso. There has been a documented rise in religiosity among Burkinabé Muslims and Christians, particularly Protestants.

== Statistics ==
=== Censuses ===
The share of Muslims in Burkina Faso increased from 55.9% to 63.8% of the total population between the 1996 and 2019 general population and housing censuses. In the same time span, the proportion of Burkinabe Christians likewise grew from 19.6% to 26.3% of the population. Conversely, practitioners of traditional religions decreased both in absolute numbers and proportionally, falling from 23.7% to 9.0% of the population in the same period.

Religious affiliation by official census year
Religion	1960		1996		2006		2019	
Religion	#	%	#	%	#	%	#	%
Muslim	1,226,500	27.5	5,764,748	55.9	8,485,149	60.5	13,082,289	63.8
Christian	169,480	3.8	2,021,271	19.6	3,249,390	23.2	5,392,856	26.3
—Catholic	165,020	3.7	1,711,893	16.6	2,664,236	19.0	4,121,536	20.1
—Protestant	4,460	0.1	309,378	3.0	585,154	4.2	1,271,320	6.2
Traditional	3,064,020	68.7	2,444,088	23.7	2,150,309	15.3	1,845,464	9.0
No religion	—N/a	—N/a	61,876	0.6	52,929	0.4	143,536	0.7
Other	—N/a	—N/a	20,626	0.2	79,485	0.6	41,010	0.2
Total	4,460,000	100	10,312,609	100	14,017,262	100	20,505,155	100

Statistics on religion in Burkina Faso are considered approximate because Islam and Christianity are often practised in tandem with African traditional religions. The Government of Burkina Faso stated in its most recent census (2019) that 63.8% of the population practises Islam, and that the majority of this group belong to the Sunni branch, while a small minority adheres to the Shi'a branch. A significant number of Sunni Muslims identify with the Tijaniyah Sufi order. The Government has also recorded that some 26.3% are Christians (20.1% being Roman Catholics and 6.2% members of various Protestant denominations), 9.0% follow Traditional indigenous beliefs such as the Lobi and Dogon religions, 0.2% have other religions, and 0.7% have none (atheism is virtually nonexistent).

== Geography ==
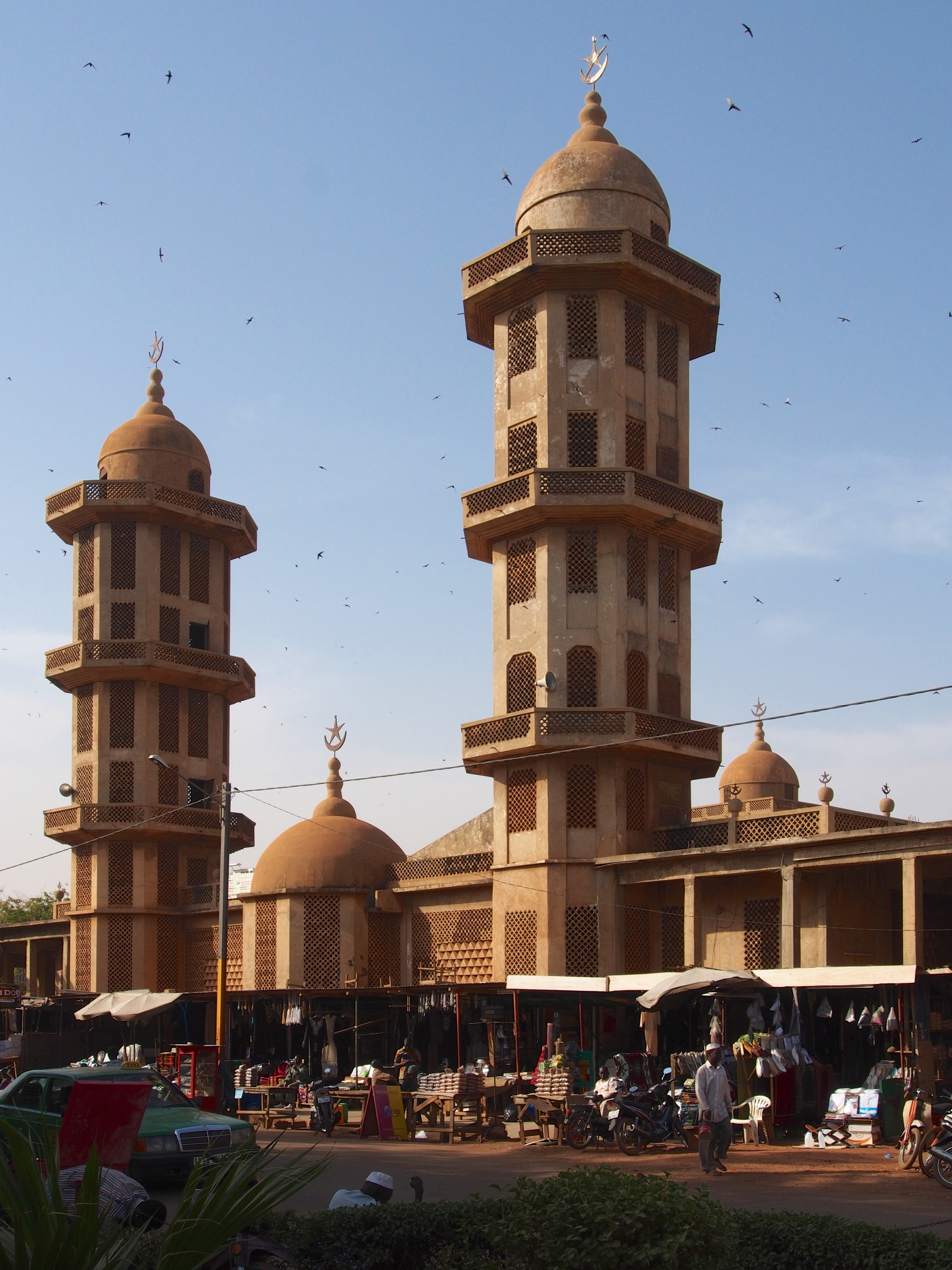
Grand Mosque of Ouagadougou.

Muslims reside largely around the northern, eastern, and western borders, while Christians live in the centre of the country. People practise traditional indigenous religious beliefs throughout the country, especially in rural communities. The region with the largest Animist population is Sud-Ouest at 48.1%, where the traditional Lobi religion is practised. Ouagadougou, the capital, has a mixed Muslim and Christian population; however, Bobo-Dioulasso, the country's second-largest city, is mostly Muslim. In 2010, small Syrian and Lebanese immigrant communities resided in the two largest cities and were overwhelmingly (more than 90 percent) Christian.

== Ethnicity and religion ==
In 2010, there were more than 60 different ethnicities in the country. Most ethnic groups are religiously heterogeneous, although the Fula, Tuareg, and Dyula are almost entirely Muslim. The Mossi are approximately 80% Muslim, with many practising other religions. Along the border with Ghana, there are Christian Gurunsi and Bobo communities.

== Freedom of religion ==
In 2023, Open Doors ranked Burkina Faso as the 23rd worst country to be a Christian. It also scored 3 out of 4 for religious freedom.

=== Bill of religious freedom 2026 ===
On 20 Jun 2026, the Members of the People's Legislative Assembly (ALP) unanimously adopted a bill on religious freedoms. The law defines the fundamental principles governing the exercise of religious freedoms throughout the national territory. It reaffirms respect for freedom of conscience, belief, and worship. It also devotes a section to religious buildings and other places of worship, specifying the conditions for their creation, location, and operation. It aims to promote a responsible practice of religion, compatible with the requirements of security, social peace, and the preservation of the public interest.

== See also ==
- Islam in Burkina Faso
- Christianity in Burkina Faso
- Roman Catholicism in Burkina Faso
- Freedom of religion in Burkina Faso
- Grande Mosquée de Ouagadougou
