= Sankara Is Not Dead =

2019 French film

- Directed by: Lucie Viver
- Written by: Lucie Viver
- Produced by: Eugénie Michel-Villette
- Starring: Bikontine
- Cinematography: Lucie Viver
- Edited by: Nicolas Milteau
- Music by: Rodolphe Burger
- Distributed by: Njutafilms
- Release date: 23 February 2019
- Running time: 109 minutes
- Countries: Burkina Faso; France
- Language: French

Sankara Is Not Dead (theatrically as Sankara n'est pas mort) is a 2019 French documentary film directed by Burkinabé filmmaker Lucie Viver and produced by Eugénie Michel-Villette. The film revolves around the young poet Bikontine who starts a journery from South to North after Burkina Faso's October 2014 popular uprising during the reign of former president Thomas Sankara.

In 2021, the film won the Best History Documentary Prize at Benin City Film Festival.

== Cast ==
- Bikontine as himself

== Awards ==
The film has received critics acclaim and screened in many international film festivals. The film also won many awards.

- Best Documentary Direction in Festival Internacional de Cine Austral
- Special Festival Mention in Tamil Nadu Film Festival
- MENTION SPÉCIALE DU JURY DOKer Festival International du Film Documentaire
- SPECIAL MENTION DOKer Moscow International Documentary Film Festival 2020
- FIRST PRIZE "Breaking boundaries" RHODE ISLAND INTERNATIONAL FILM FESTIVAL 2020
- Best Documentary Feature Budapest IFF HUNGARY 2019
- SPECIAL JURY PRIZE in African International Film Festival AFRIFF
- JOHN MARSHALL AWARD for Contemporary Ethnographic Media au Camden IFF, USA
- ENTREVUES DE BELFORT, PRIX FILM EN COURS 2018
