= Ahmadiyya in Burkina Faso =

Islamic movement

Ahmadiyya is an Islamic branch in Burkina Faso under the leadership of the caliph in London. Although the Community was established and officially recognized as an Islamic community in 1986, there were small communities of Ahmadi Muslims in existence several decades prior to its establishment.

== History ==
=== Early communities ===
Ahmadiyya Islamic teachings spilt over into the French Upper Volta, in modern-day Burkina Faso, following the route of traders, primarily as a consequence of Ahmadiyya missions in the Gold Coast, in modern-day Ghana. The two former colonies were linked by an important trade route crossing their common border and passing through Wa, a town in northern Ghana which played a crucial role in the rise of the Ahmadiyya in Burkina Faso.

A report of 1934 indicates a frequent movement of the Sanan people to Ghana to work in plantations and gold mines in Kumasi. Among them was Bitomo Barro, an ethnic Sanan from Kougny, Nayala Province, who was on his way for a fortune in Ghana. When he arrived in Wa, which today lies in the Upper West Region of Ghana, he became an Ahmadi Muslim on hearing the Ahmadiyya teachings. When he returned to his hometown he introduced the Ahmadiyya Community to its inhabitants. However, beyond the Barro family, his message was rejected by the majority of people, who were generally Muslims. A few decades later, in the year 1973 there were widespread anti-Wahhabi sentiments, particularly noticeable in major cities across the country. The inhabitants of Kougny took this as an opportunity to loot and bully the Ahmadiyya Community, which happened to be still confined to the extended Barro family. Imam Modi Barro was forced to take refuge in Siena, a town in the Yaba department, northeast of Kougny.

Locations of some of the earliest instances where Burkinabe people accepted Ahmadiyya Islam prior to its missionary activities in the country. The town of Wa, Ghana, was an important trading centre which facilitated the spread of Ahmadi teachings in modern day Burkina Faso.

In a separate development, Yusuf Kanate, a local from Ouahabou, and a seasonal traveller to gold mining sites in Ghana, converted to Ahmadiyya in 1949 whilst in Wa. Kanate’s town of Ouahabou was formerly founded in 1850 by Al Haji Mamadou Karantao, a descendant of Marka Muslims from northwest Mali. A pioneer of the Ahmadiyya movement in the Koho-Boromo-Ouahabou department in the Balé Province, the community of Ahmadi Muslims Kanate initiated remained small. He was ultimately rejected by his fellow Marka Muslims. As a consequence he left his hometown and established Hérédougou, a village which today lies in the Pâ department, roughly 5 km from Ouahabou.

In the late 1950s, a Ghanaian Ahmadi trader is said to have preached as he travelled north from Ashanti, Ghana, into the French Upper Volta. Of the forty converts he claimed, he brought with him two of the converts to the 1959 Annual Conference held in Saltpond, the then location of the headquarters of the Ghanaian Ahmadiyya Muslim Community.

In another development, Moctar Sanfo was an ethnic Yarga and a trader from Sagbotenga, a town in the Léo department of Burkina Faso. In Wa, Sanfo had a lodger named Salia Tegda who happened to be an Ahmadi Muslim Marabout. Sanfo requested the Marabout to pray for the prosperity of his trade and a safe journey back home to Sagbotenga. For Sanfo the prayer was answered with success. As a result, he joined the Ahmadiyya Muslim Community and introduced his new faith to the people of his hometown. Despite acknowledging the harsh journey ahead, Sanfo sent two of his children to Ghana in 1956 for their religious training. The two children later played a decisive role in the future of Ahmadiyya in Burkina Faso.

=== Establishment ===
By 1960 Burkina Faso gained full independence from France. For over two decades following independence, the minority character of the Ahmadiyya Muslim Community was still observed until 1986 when the governmental authorities recognized and registered it as a Muslim community.

== Modern community ==
In Burkina Faso, there are many primary schools and hospitals running across the country. In addition to this, there are 4 radio stations and a large number of mosques and mission housed all over the country. Mali, which has 11 radio stations, is the only country in West Africa that has more Ahmadi radio stations than Burkina Faso.

Since the late 20th century, radio networks in Burkina Faso have become a social phenomenon. In 2002 the Ahmadiyya Muslim Community of Burkina Faso opened the country’s first Muslim radio station in Bobo-Dioulasso, Burkina Faso’s second largest city. The station was opened primarily to respond to allegations against the Community and to present the Ahmadiyya perspective on Islamic issues. Since then the Community has so far opened three other radio stations. As a consequence, a number of Sunni organizations have turned their attention towards the same method of conveying their teachings.

== See also ==
- Shia Islam in Burkina Faso
- Islam in Burkina Faso
