= Freedom of religion in Burkina Faso =

The Constitution of Burkina Faso provides freedom of religion, and the Government respects this right in practice. Government policy contributes to the generally free practice of religion. There were no reports of societal abuses or discrimination based on religious belief or practice; however, at times community members forced older women falsely accused of being witches to flee their villages.

== Religious demography ==
While exact statistics on religious affiliation are not available and vary widely, the Government estimated in its most recent census (2019) 63.8% of the population are Muslim (predominantly Sunni), 20.1% are Roman Catholic, 6.2% belong to various Protestant groups, and 9.0% follow indigenous religions; however, the exact percentages might be hard to accurately predict due to a high degree of Syncretism that occurs in the country between Christians or Muslims and Traditional indigenous beliefs.

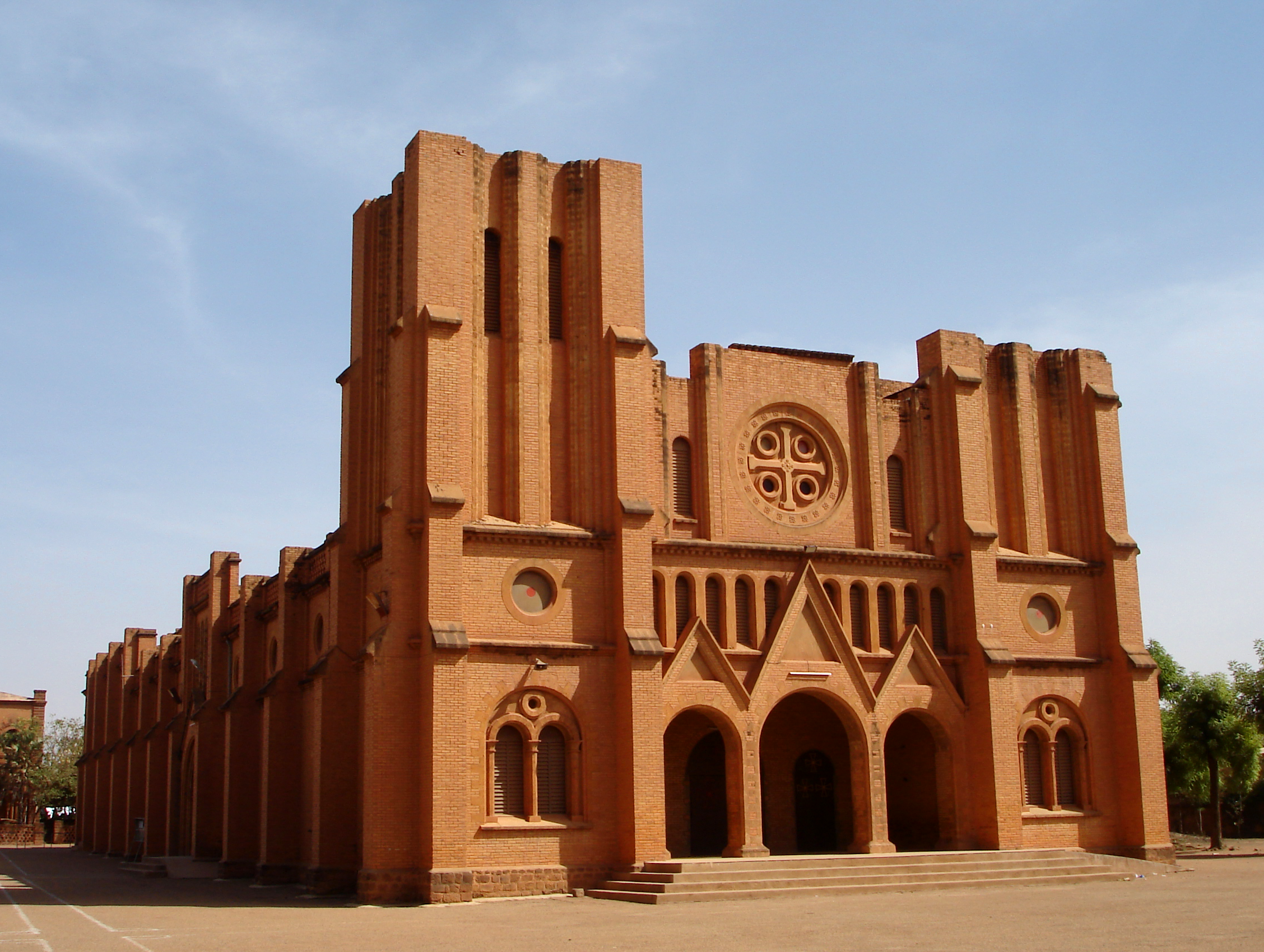
Cathedral of Ouagadougou

Muslims reside largely around the northern, eastern, and western borders, while Christians live in the center of the country. People practice traditional indigenous religious beliefs throughout the country, especially in rural communities. Most ethnic groups are religiously heterogeneous, although the Fulani community is overwhelmingly Muslim.

== Status of religious freedom ==
=== Legal and policy framework ===
Article 31 of the Constitution states that "Burkina Faso is a democratic, unitary and secular State".

The Constitution provides for freedom of religion, and the Government generally respected this right in practice. The Government at all levels sought to protect this right in full and did not tolerate its abuse, either by governmental or private actors.

The Constitution and laws protect the right of individuals to choose and change their religion and provide the right to practice the religion of one's choice. The Government observes and enforces these provisions. The country is a secular state. Islam, Christianity, and traditional indigenous religious beliefs were practiced freely without government interference. There is no official state religion, and the Government neither subsidized nor favored any particular religion. The practice of a particular religion was not known to confer any advantage or disadvantage in the political arena, the civil service, the military, or the private sector.

The Government establishes the following religious holy days as national holidays: Eid al-Adha, Easter Monday, Ascension Day, the Muhammad's birthday, Assumption Day, All Saints' Day, Ramadan, and Christmas Day.

The Government requires all organizations, religious or otherwise, to register with the Ministry of Territorial Administration. Registration confers legal status, but it entails no specific controls or benefits. According to article 45 of the Freedom of Association Code, failure to register may result in a fine of approximately $97 to $292 (50,000 CFA to 150,000 CFA). The Government gives all religious groups equal access to registration and routinely approves their applications. The Government taxes religious groups only if they engage in commercial activities, such as farming and dairy production.

The Constitution provides freedom of expression in publications and broadcasts, including those by religious groups, unless the judicial system determines that such expression is harming public order or committing slander; the judicial system has never made such a determination. The Government did not deny a publishing or broadcasting license to any religious group that requested one during the period covered by this report.

Religious organizations operate under the same regulatory framework for publishing and broadcasting rights as other entities. The Ministry of Security has the right to request samples of proposed publications and broadcasts to verify that they are in accordance with the stated nature of the religious group; however, there were no reports that religious broadcasters experienced difficulties with this regulation. Additionally, the Government does not grant special tax preferences to religious organizations operating print or broadcast media.

Foreign missionary groups operate freely and face few, if any, restrictions; however, missionary groups occasionally faced complicated bureaucratic procedures in pursuit of particular activities.

Public schools do not offer religious instruction. Muslim, Catholic, and Protestant groups operate primary and secondary schools. Although school officials have to submit the names of their directors to the Government and register their schools, religious or otherwise, the Government does not appoint or approve these officials.

The Government does not fund religious schools or require them to pay taxes unless they conduct for-profit activities. The Government reviews the curriculum of religious schools to ensure that they offer the full standard academic curriculum. The Government, however, does not interfere with the curriculum of supplemental classes offered by private schools, such as classes on the Bible or the Qur'an.

The government taxes religious groups only if they engage in commercial activities, such as farming or dairy production.

=== Forced religious conversion ===
There were no reports of forced religious conversion, including of minor U.S. citizens who had been abducted or illegally removed from the United States, or of the refusal to allow such citizens to be returned to the United States.

=== Homosexuality ===
Homosexual activity is legal in Burkina Faso, and the country has neither passed a law prohibiting such activity nor has ever criminalized it.

== Societal abuses and discrimination ==
There were no reports of societal abuses or discrimination based on religious belief or practice; however, at times community members forced old women falsely accused of being witches to flee their villages. The Catholic Church funded-Delwende Center that houses and feeds women accused of witchcraft reported seven cases of this kind. The Ministry of Social Action and National Solidarity, along with various other nongovernmental and religious organizations, also maintained similar shelters in Ouagadougou.

Some Muslims considered the 1996 law against female genital mutilation (FGM) as discriminating against their religious practices and continued performing the procedure. Sometimes non-Muslim FGM practitioners performed the procedure during baptismal ceremonies because the baby was expected to cry during the ceremony.

Unlike in previous reports, there were no reports of tensions within sectors of the Muslim community during the period covered by this report.

== 2022 onwards ==
Terrorist violence has risen from 2021 to 2022, with 50% more deaths during this time period. In 2022, many members of the ethnic Fulani community had been recruited by extremist groups. This led to discrimination and violence against the Fulani community. Terrorism and threats of attack have closed 22% of schools and hundreds of Christian churches. Some mosques and animist temples were also attacked.

Military officers staged two coups in 2022 and by the end of the year, Captain Ibrahim Traoré became the youngest serving president in the world. The new transition authorities maintain policies permitting the free practice of religion in areas of the country which they control.

In 2023, Burkina Faso was ranked as the 23rd worst country to be a Christian. It also scored 3 out of 4 for religious freedom.

== See also ==
- Religion in Burkina Faso
- Islam in Burkina Faso
- Christianity in Burkina Faso
- Roman Catholicism in Burkina Faso
- Grande Mosquée de Ouagadougou
