= International rankings of Burkina Faso =

These are the international rankings of Burkina Faso.

== International rankings ==
Organization	Survey	Ranking
Institute for Economics and Peace	Global Peace Index	71 out of 144
United Nations Development Programme	Human Development Index	177 out of 182
Transparency International	Corruption Perceptions Index	79 out of 180
World Economic Forum	Global Competitiveness Report	128 out of 133
Mo Ibrahim Foundation	Ibrahim Index	27 out of 52
World Intellectual Property Organization	Global Innovation Index, 2026	130 out of 139
