= Tourism in Burkina Faso =

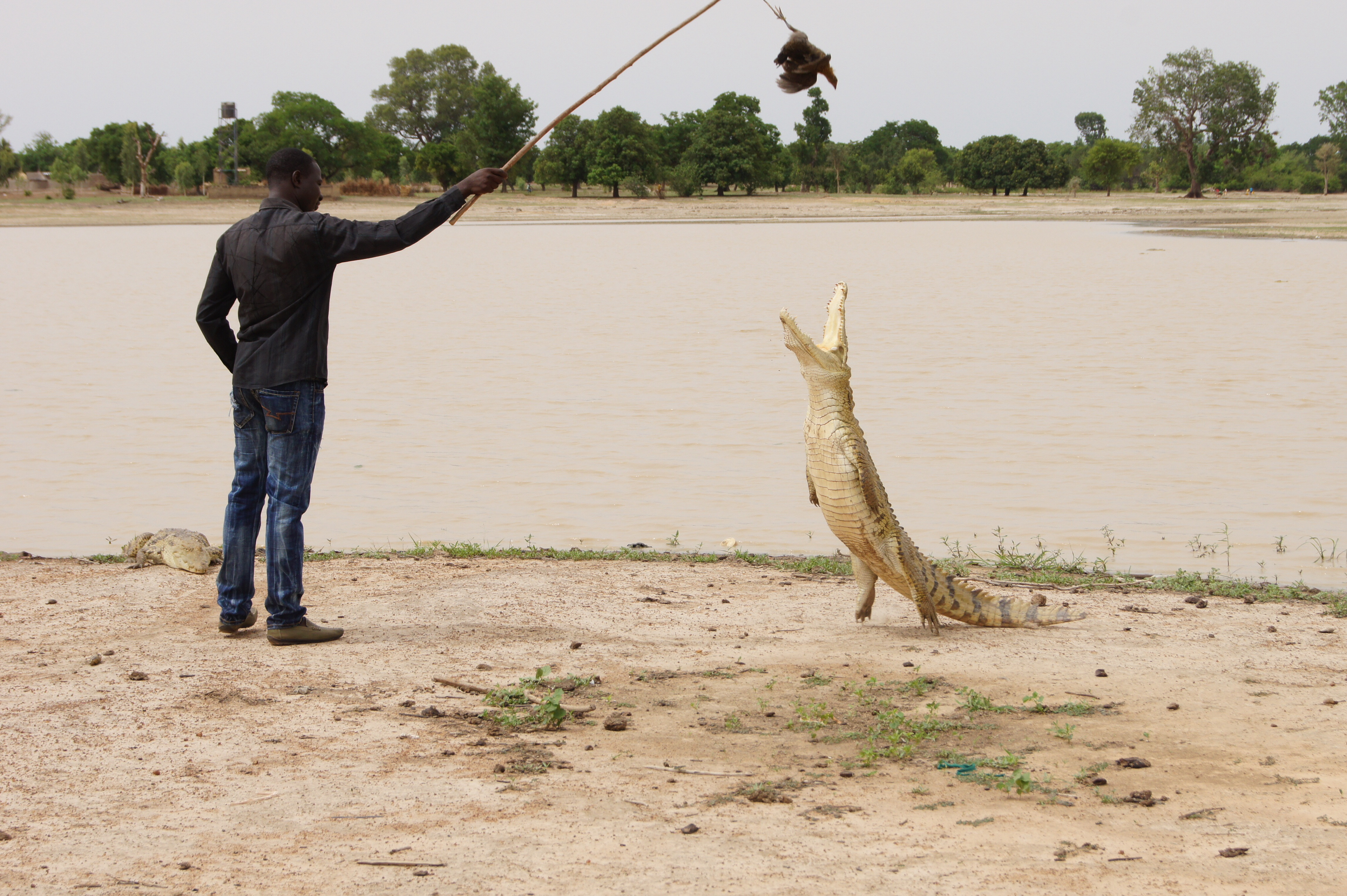
Tourist guide teasing a crocodile near Ouagadougou.

Burkina Faso has many interesting locations for tourists. However, the country annually receives less tourism than most African countries.

== The Center ==
=== Ouagadougou ===
Sites of interest to tourists in Ouagadougou include: The Bangr Weogo Urban Park, the National Museum of Burkina Faso, the International Art & Craft Fair and the Panafrican Film and Television Festival of Ouagadougou.

=== Ziniaré ===
Sites of interest in Ziniaré include: the Ziniare Wildlife Park, the granite sculpture symposium, which takes place every two years, and the Museum of Manega.

=== Koudougou ===
Sites of interest in Koudougou include the sacred crocodiles of Sabou.

== The West ==
=== Bobo-Dioulasso ===
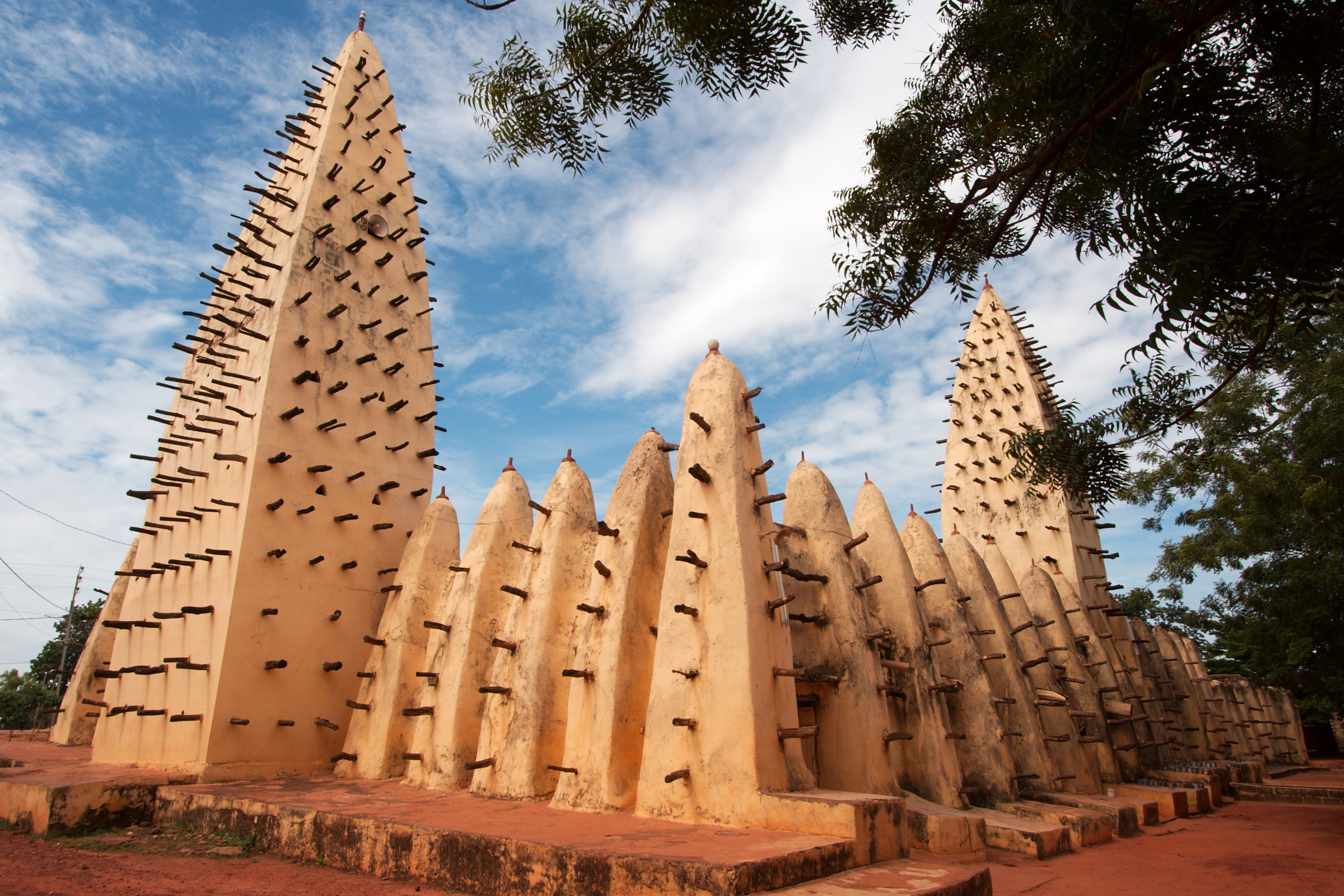
Grand Mosque of Bobo Dioulasso

Sites of interest in Bobo-Dioulasso include: the Grand Mosque, the mausoleum of Guimbi Ouattara, the Houet Provincial Museum, and the Guinguette.

=== Banfora ===
Sites of interest in Banfora include: the Natural Waterfall of Banfora, Lake Tengrela, and the Peaks of Sindou.

== The East ==
=== Diapaga ===
Sites of interest in Diapaga include the Arli National Park, the W National Park and the cliffs of Gobnangou.

== The Sahel ==
=== Djibo ===
Sites of interest in Djibo include the Archaeological Museum of Pobé Mengao and the stone carvings of Pobé Mengao.

=== Gorom Gorom ===
Sites of interest in Gorom Gorom include the Feminine Artisan Center of Gorom and the tourist camp of Gorom Gorom.

== Visitor statistics ==
Most visitors arriving to Burkina Faso for tourism purposes were from the following countries of nationality:

Country	2016	2015	2014	2013
France	23,993	23,840	29,311	35,715
Ivory Coast	14,914	16,665	16,509	18,852
Mali	11,956	12,687	12,469	16,065
Niger	8,884	9,452	7,766	11,265
Senegal	7,617	6,527	6,824	9,566
Togo	7,438	5,824	6,498	8,604
Benin	6,915	6,103	8,113	8,622
United States	5,611	5,923	5,984	7,748
Ghana	5,122	5,199	6,074	7,090
Total	151,783	156,036	181,410	206,954
