= Islam in Burkina Faso =

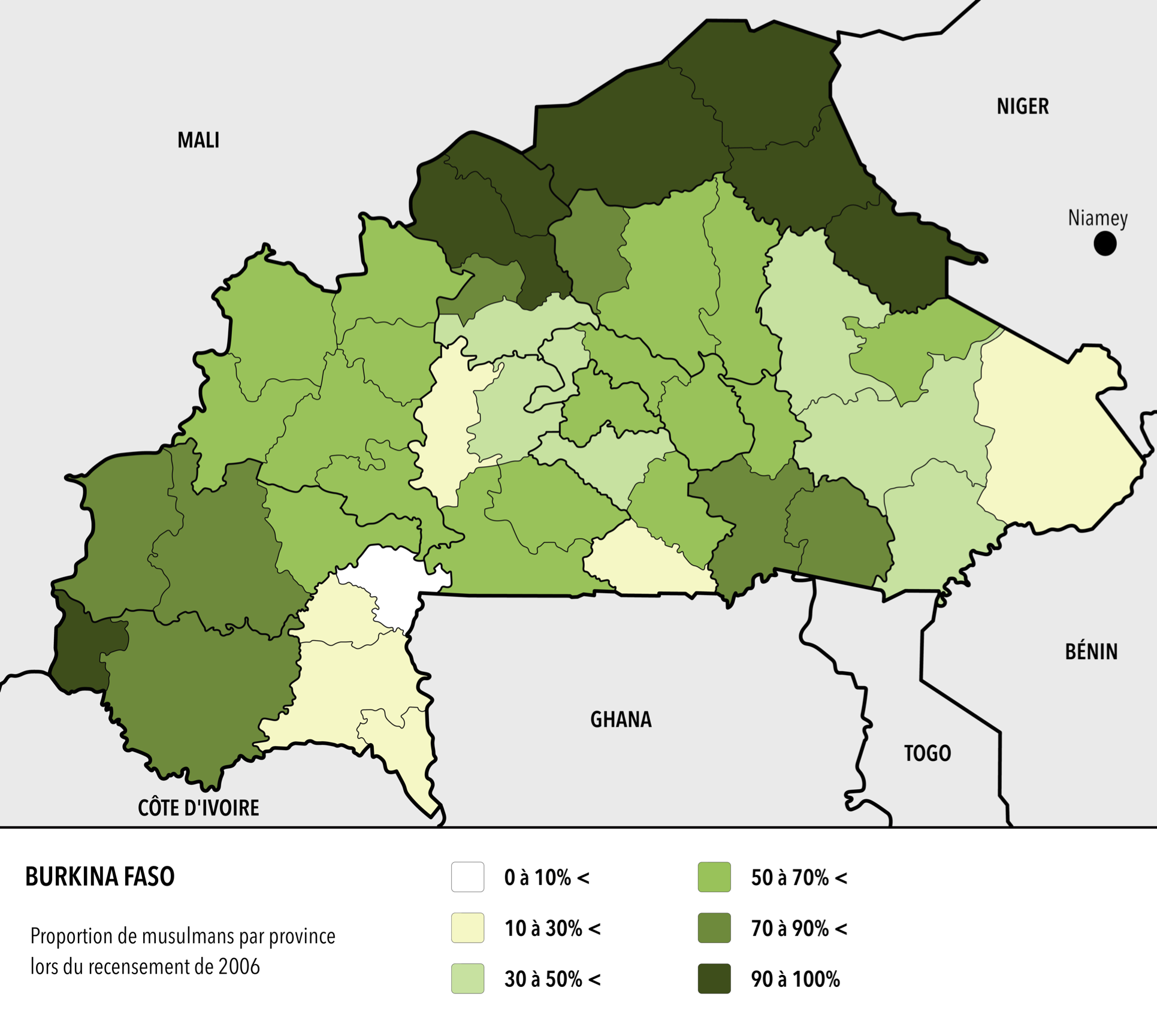
Muslim population distribution on map

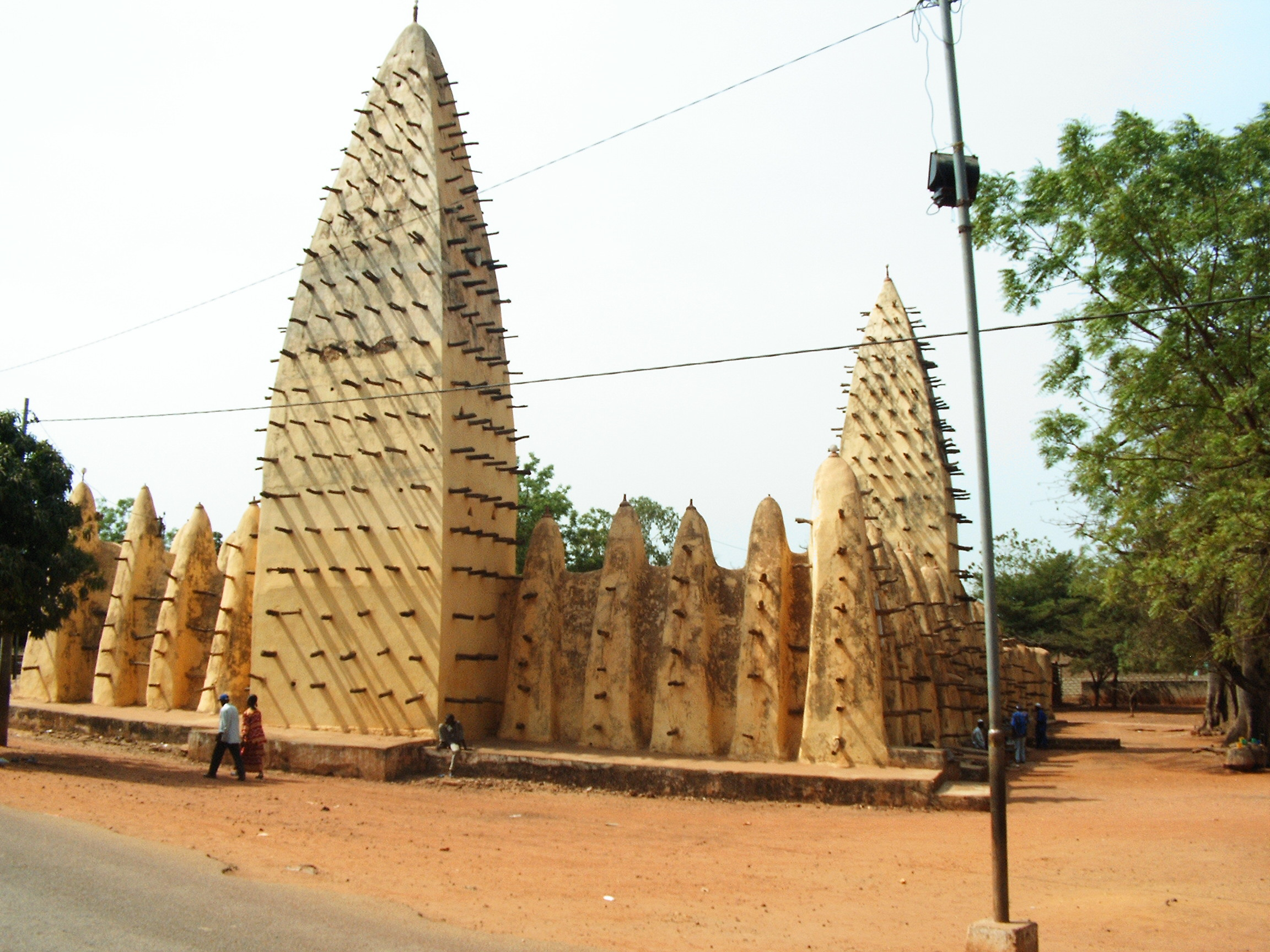
Grand Mosque in Bobo-Dioulasso, Burkina Faso

Islam in Burkina Faso (Upper Volta) has a long and varied history. According to the 2010 census, the population of the country was 63.2% Muslim. The 2019 census notes that 63.8% of the population are Muslim, with a Sunni majority and a small Shia minority.

Although the vast majority of Muslims are Sunni Muslims who follow Maliki school of thought, small minorities follow Shia Islam and Ahmadiyya. According to the Pew Research Center less than 1% of Burkinabe Muslims are Shia.

== History ==
Until the end of the 19th century, the Upper Volta was dominated by the Mossi Kingdoms, who are believed to have come from central or eastern Africa sometime in the 11th century. The Mossi initially defended their religious beliefs and social structure against Islamic influences from Muslims from the northwest. In the 15th century the Upper Volta region attracted Muslim merchants and settlements by the opening of the Akan gold fields, and the opportunity to trade in gold, kola nuts, and salt. Some of these merchants were Soninke-speaking peoples from Timbuktu and Djenné who later adopted Malinke dialect and became known as Dyula. They settled in the towns of Bobo-Dyulasso, Kong, Bunduku, and other places leading to the goldfields. Other traders came from Kanem, Bornu, and the Hausa city-states and moved into Gonja, Dagomba, and other parts of the Volta region. Muslims married local women and raised families, which were tied to the Muslim community through the father and to the local pagan community through the mother. The offspring of these marriages often inherited chieftainships and brought about the conversion of local peoples. They organized festivals, offered prayers and divination at local courts, distributed talismans, and participated in anti-witchcraft rituals. As a result, Muslims in the region were not a distinct language group but regarded themselves as part of the Mossi kingdom.

Throughout the region, the Dyula communities maintained a high standard of Muslim education. A Dyula family enterprise based on the lu, a working unit consisting of a father, his sons, and other attached males, could afford to give some of its younger men a Muslim education. Thus there emerged an ulema class known as karamokos, who were educated in Qur'an, tafsir, hadith, and the life of Muhammad. A student read these works with a single teacher over a period varying from five to thirty years, and earned his living as a part-time farmer working on the lands of his teacher. Having completed his studies, a karamoko obtained a turban and an ijazah, his license to teach, and set forth in search of further instruction or to start his own school in a remote village. Certain families provided scholars generation after generation. During the great Senegambian jihad led by Ma Ba (1809–1867) Islam spread in the stateless region of the Upper Volta, the Ivory Coast and Guinea.

French colonial rule was imposed on Upper Volta in 1919, but it was divided among the Ivory Coast, Niger, and French Sudan, and then reconstituted in 1947. French rule was characterized by a promotion of secular elites selected from the indigenous population, but it also aided the peaceful spread of Islam. Colonial administration indirectly favored the spread of Islam by creating peace and order and by stimulating trade. They also tended to regard Muslims as culturally and educationally more advanced than non-Muslim Africans, and appointed Muslim chiefs and clerks as administrators in non-Muslim areas. In Upper Volta at the end of the 19th century there were only some 30,000 Muslims, but by 1959 there were 800,000, approximately 20 percent of the population.

In 1984, Upper Volta was renamed Burkina Faso. After a succession of military coups, a constitutional republic was established in 1991. In Burkina Faso the Arabist and Islamist movement is viewed a counter-culture to the European style of modernity, and also a way of integrating the disparate ethnic groups which make up the Muslim population of the country. Madrasa education, which began just after World War II, now serves half of the Muslim population, though only tiny minorities reach the secondary level. Islam is also strengthened by the construction of mosques, preaching on national television, official recognition of Muslim festivals, and support from the Arab world. Madrasa education appeals to the lower middle classes, excluded from political power, who favor a state based on sharia. The Islamic movements, however, are divided into numerous factions.

== See also ==
- Ahmadiyya in Burkina Faso
- Religion in Burkina Faso
- Freedom of religion in Burkina Faso
- Christianity in Burkina Faso
- Grande Mosquée de Ouagadougou
