= Grand Mosque of Ouagadougou =

Mosque in Ouagadougou, Burkina Faso

- Grande Mosquée de Ouagadougou
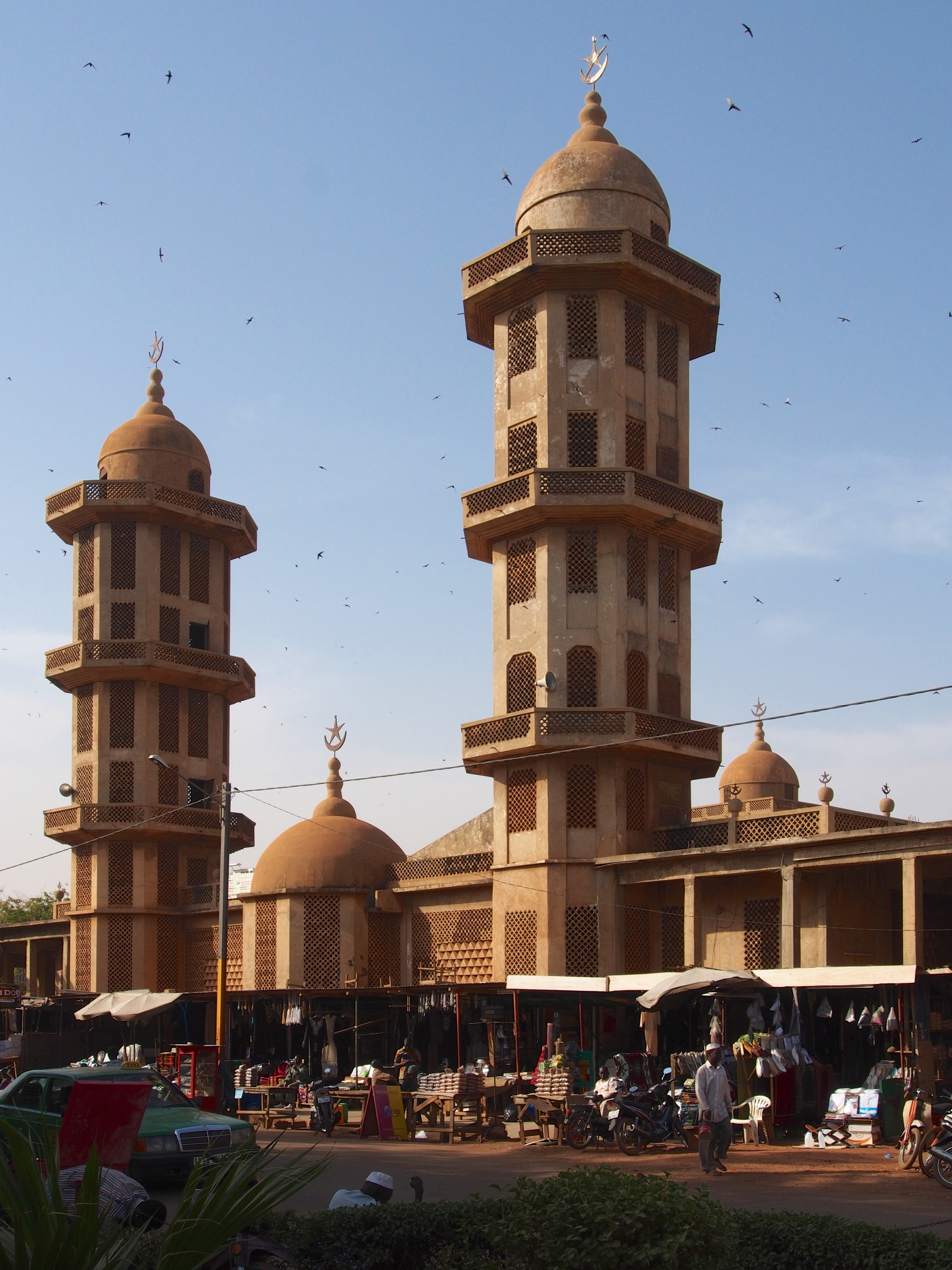

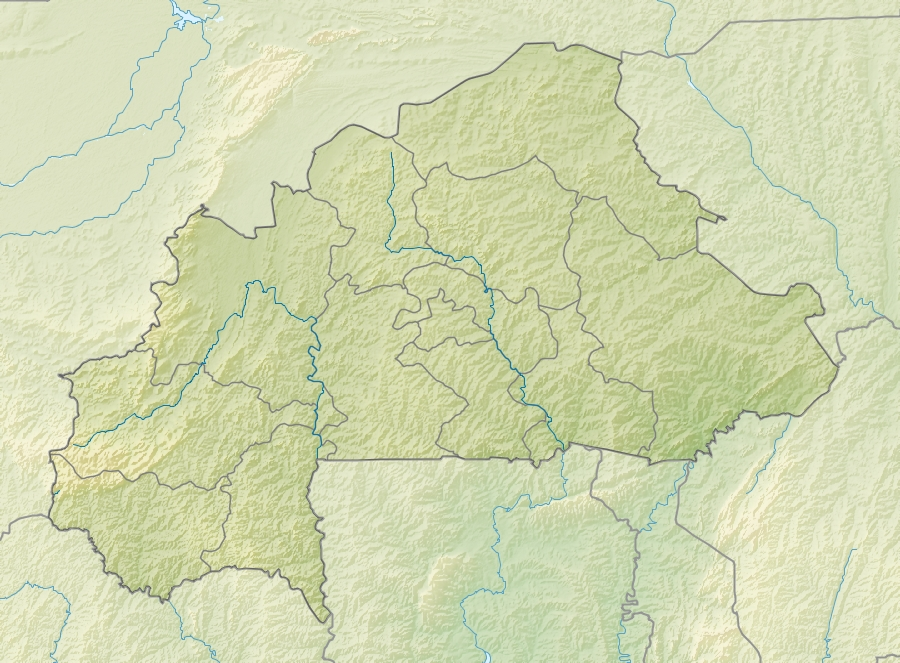
- Location within Burkina Faso

Religion
- Affiliation: Islam

Location
- Location: Ouagadougou, Burkina Faso
- Country: Burkina Faso
- Interactive map of Grand Mosque of Ouagadougou
- Coordinates: 12.36625°N 1.52122°W

Architecture
- Type: Mosque
- Established: 1952
- Completed: 1979

Specifications
- Dome: 1
- Minaret: 4

The Grand Mosque of Ouagadougou (French: Grande Mosquée de Ouagadougou; Arabic: الجامع الكبير في واغادوغو) is a historic mosque in Ouagadougou, the capital of Burkina Faso. It is one of the city's principal Islamic places of worship and has played an important role in the religious life of the Muslim community of Ouagadougou.

== History ==
The Grand Mosque of Ouagadougou in 1980.

A mosque was first established on the site in 1952, following efforts by Muslims in Ouagadougou to obtain land for a Friday mosque. The construction was supported by the Mossi traditional ruler, the Moro Naba, and received authorization from the colonial administration. As the Muslim population of Ouagadougou increased, the original building became too small. Major reconstruction works were undertaken between 1973 and 1979 under the leadership of businessman and Muslim community leader Oumarou Kanazoé. The reconstructed mosque was inaugurated in April 1979 by President Sangoulé Lamizana. According to contemporary reports, the reconstruction was entirely financed by Kanazoé at a cost of approximately 320 million West African CFA francs. The main prayer building covered about 1,925 m², while the complex included two annexes for women and a paved courtyard of approximately 7,000 m².

== Architecture ==
The mosque has a large prayer hall and a central dome, with four minarets according to an architectural study of mosques in Ouagadougou. The building has undergone further renovations and expansions as the city's Muslim population has grown.

== Religious significance ==
The Grand Mosque has historically served as an important center of Muslim religious life in Ouagadougou. It was associated with the organization of the Muslim community in the city and served as a major venue for Friday prayers.

== See also ==
- Islam in Burkina Faso
- West African Mosques
- Mossi people
