= Demographics of Burkina Faso =

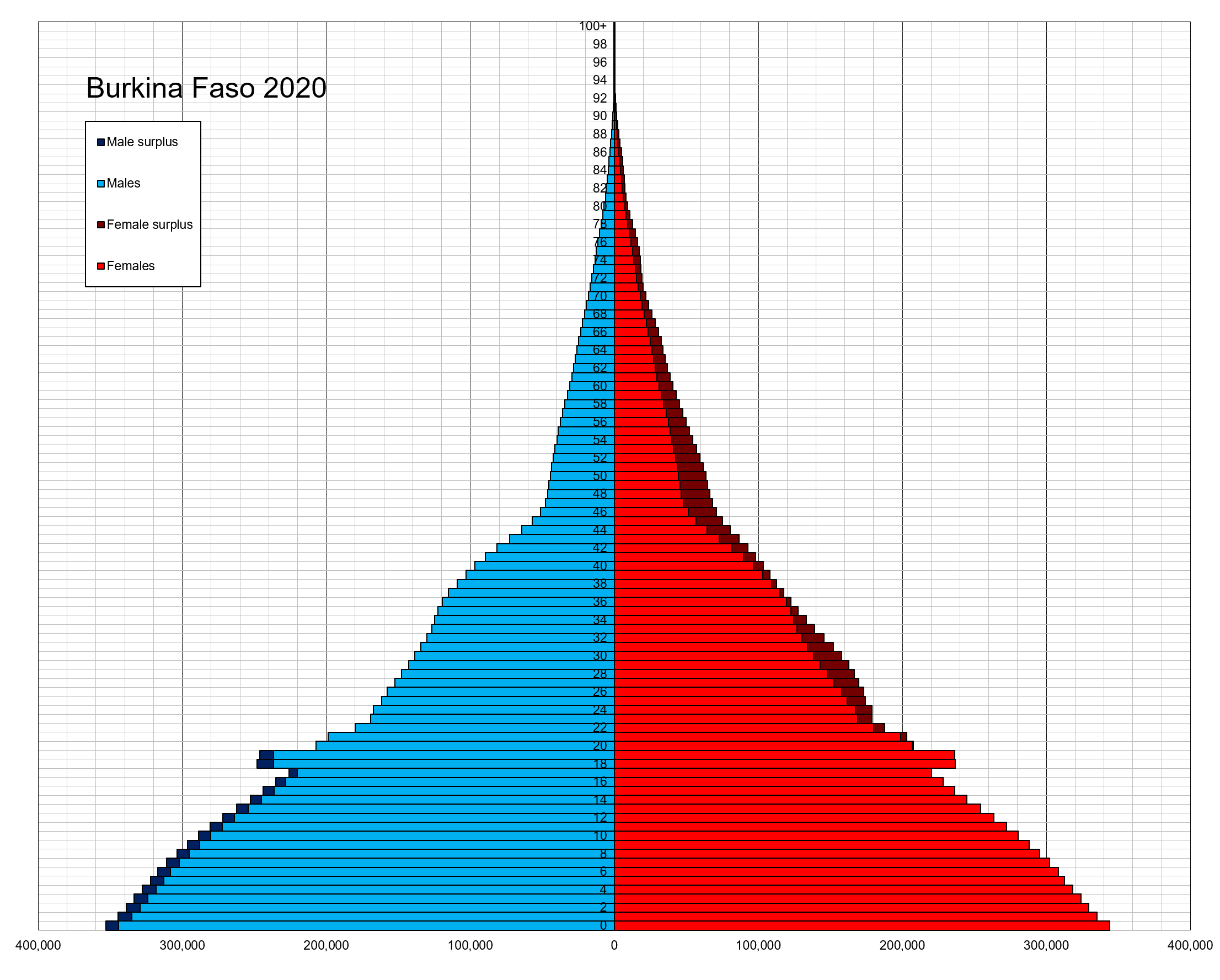
- Population pyramid of Burkina Faso in 2020
- Population: 21,935,389 (2022 est.)
- Growth rate: 2.53% (2022 est.)
- Birth rate: 30.8 births/1,000 population (2025 est.)
- Death rate: 7.8 deaths/1,000 population (2025 est.)
- Life expectancy: 63.44 years
  - male: 61.63 years
  - female: 65.31 years
- Fertility rate: 4.00 children born/woman (2025 est.)
- Infant mortality: 49.42 deaths/1,000 live births
- Net migration rate: -0.61 migrant(s)/1,000 population (2022 est.)

Age structure
- 0–14 years: 43.58%
- 65 and over: 3.16%

Sex ratio
- Total: 0.96 male(s)/female (2022 est.)
- At birth: 1.03 male(s)/female
- Under 15: 1.03 male(s)/female
- 65 and over: 0.66 male(s)/female

Nationality
- Nationality: Burkinabe
- Major ethnic: Mossi (52%)
- Minor ethnic: Fula (6.8%) Gurunsi (5.9%) Gourma (5.2%) Other (26.9%)

Language
- Official: Mooré, Dyula, Fula, Bissa
- Spoken: Languages of Burkina Faso; Working languages: Arabic, French, English

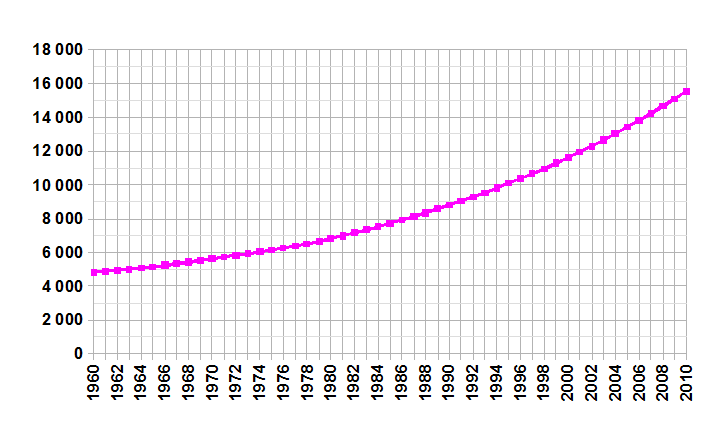
Burkina Faso's population, 1960 to 2010. Number of inhabitants in thousands.

Burkina Faso's 22 million people belong to two major West African cultural groups: the Gur (Voltaic) and the Mandé. The Voltaic are far more numerous and include the Mossi, who make up about one-half of the population. The Mossi claim descent from warriors who migrated to present-day Burkina Faso and established an empire that lasted more than 800 years. Predominantly farmers, the Mossi are still bound by the traditions of the Mogho Naba, who hold court in Ouagadougou.

Most of Burkina Faso's population is concentrated in the south and center of the country, with a population density sometimes exceeding 48 inhabitants per square kilometer (120 inhabitants per square mile). This population density, high for Africa, causes annual migrations of hundreds of thousands of Burkinabé to Ivory Coast and Ghana for seasonal agricultural work. About a third of Burkinabé adhere to traditional African religions. The introduction of Islam to Burkina Faso was initially resisted by the Mossi rulers. Christians, predominantly Roman Catholics, are largely concentrated among the urban elite.

Few Burkinabé have had formal education. Schooling is free but not compulsory, and only about 29% of Burkina's primary school-age children receive a basic education. The University of Ouagadougou, founded in 1974, was the country's first institution of higher education. The Polytechnic University of Bobo-Dioulasso in Bobo-Dioulasso was opened in 1995.

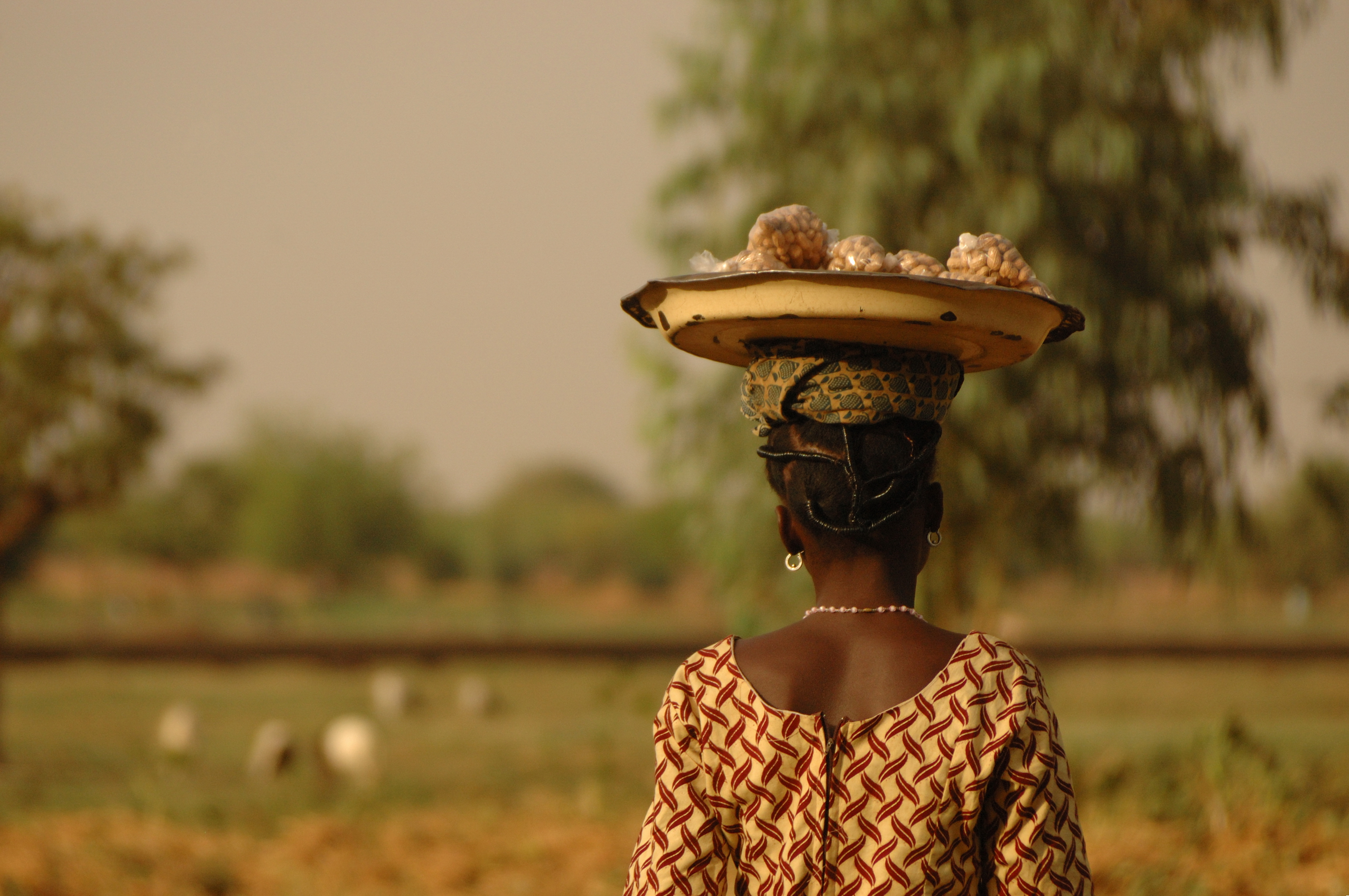
A peanut seller in Ouagadougou

== Population ==
Burkina Faso has a young age structure – the result of declining mortality combined with steady high fertility – and continues to experience rapid population growth, which is putting increasing pressure on the country's limited arable land. More than 65% of the population is under the age of 25, and the population is growing at 3% annually.

Mortality rates, especially those of infants and children, have decreased because of improved health care, hygiene, and sanitation, but women continue to have an average of almost 6 children. Even if fertility were substantially reduced, today's large cohort entering their reproductive years would sustain high population growth for the foreseeable future. Only about a third of the population is literate and unemployment is widespread, dampening the economic prospects of Burkina Faso's large working-age population.

The population was 20,903,000 in 2020, compared to only 4,284,000 in 1950. The proportion of children below the age of 15 in 2020 was 44.4%, 53.2% of the population was between 15 and 65 years of age, while 2.4% was 65 years or older.

	Total population	Population aged 0–14 (%)	Population aged 15–64 (%)	Population aged 65+ (%)
1950	4 284 000	40.7	57.3	2.0
1955	4 517 000	41.0	56.9	2.2
1960	4 829 000	41.3	56.3	2.3
1965	5 175 000	42.2	55.2	2.5
1970	5 625 000	43.3	53.9	2.8
1975	6 155 000	44.2	52.8	3.0
1980	6 823 000	45.6	51.2	3.2
1985	7 728 000	46.7	50.0	3.3
1990	8 811 000	47.3	49.5	3.3
1995	10 090 000	47.1	49.8	3.1
2000	11 608 000	46.8	50.5	2.8
2005	13 422 000	46.5	50.9	2.6
2010	15 605 000	46.2	51.3	2.5
2015	18 111 000	45.6	52.0	2.4
2020	20 903 000	44.4	53.2	2.4

Population Estimates by Sex and Age Group (1.VII.2021) (Data refer to national projections.):

Age group	Male	Female	Total	%
Total	10 393 241	11 116 202	21 509 443	100
0–4	1 971 908	1 860 417	3 832 325	17.82
5–9	1 646 122	1 589 070	3 235 192	15.04
10–14	1 367 531	1 390 910	2 758 441	12.82
15–19	1 122 566	1 204 719	2 327 285	10.82
20–24	908 843	1 033 776	1 942 619	9.03
25–29	730 372	884 547	1 614 919	7.51
30–34	588 794	728 172	1 316 966	6.12
35–39	468 316	586 269	1 054 585	4.90
40–44	372 345	466 984	839 329	3.90
45–49	300 835	370 491	671 326	3.12
50–54	248 194	293 790	541 984	2.52
55–59	194 917	224 363	419 280	1.95
60–64	149 409	164 492	313 901	1.46
65–69	112 992	120 551	233 543	1.09
70–74	83 974	84 008	167 982	0.78
75–79	60 706	51 775	112 481	0.52
80+	65 417	61 868	127 285	0.59
Age group	Male	Female	Total	Percent
0–14	4 985 561	4 840 397	9 825 958	45.68
15–64	5 084 591	5 957 603	11 042 194	51.34
65+	323 089	318 202	641 291	2.98

== Vital statistics ==
Burkina Faso's population, fertility rate and net reproduction rate, United Nations estimates, July 2022

Registration of vital events is not complete in Burkina Faso. The website Our World in Data prepared the following estimates based on statistics from the Population Department of the United Nations.

	Mid-year population	Live births	Deaths	Natural change	Crude birth rate (per 1000)	Crude death rate (per 1000)	Natural change (per 1000)	Total fertility rate (TFR)	Infant mortality (per 1000 live births)	Life expectancy (in years)
1950	4,214,000	184,000	119,000	65,000	43.5	28.2	15.3	5.82	170.1	33.12
1951	4,262,000	188,000	119,000	68,000	43.9	27.9	16.0	5.87	168.9	33.38
1952	4,313,000	192,000	121,000	71,000	44.3	27.9	16.4	5.93	167.8	33.55
1953	4,364,000	195,000	121,000	74,000	44.6	27.8	16.9	5.98	166.6	33.85
1954	4,417,000	199,000	123,000	76,000	44.9	27.7	17.2	6.01	165.2	34.13
1955	4,473,000	202,000	124,000	79,000	45.1	27.6	17.6	6.06	163.8	34.45
1956	4,531,000	206,000	125,000	81,000	45.4	27.5	17.8	6.09	162.3	34.67
1957	4,591,000	210,000	126,000	83,000	45.5	27.4	18.1	6.13	160.8	34.97
1958	4,652,000	214,000	128,000	86,000	45.8	27.3	18.5	6.17	159.3	35.26
1959	4,715,000	218,000	128,000	89,000	46.1	27.2	18.9	6.22	157.7	35.61
1960	4,783,000	222,000	130,000	92,000	46.3	27.1	19.2	6.25	156.2	35.87
1961	4,853,000	226,000	131,000	95,000	46.5	26.9	19.6	6.29	154.8	36.24
1962	4,924,000	231,000	132,000	99,000	46.7	26.7	20.0	6.32	153.5	36.67
1963	4,999,000	235,000	133,000	102,000	46.9	26.5	20.4	6.36	152.4	36.97
1964	5,076,000	240,000	134,000	106,000	47.2	26.4	20.8	6.42	151.2	37.25
1965	5,158,000	245,000	135,000	110,000	47.3	26.1	21.2	6.47	150.1	37.69
1966	5,243,000	249,000	137,000	113,000	47.5	26.0	21.5	6.53	149.1	37.92
1967	5,331,000	254,000	138,000	117,000	47.6	25.8	21.8	6.59	148.2	38.29
1968	5,422,000	260,000	139,000	120,000	47.8	25.6	22.1	6.65	147.3	38.53
1969	5,516,000	263,000	140,000	123,000	47.6	25.4	22.2	6.66	146.6	38.86
1970	5,612,000	268,000	141,000	126,000	47.6	25.1	22.4	6.69	145.4	39.24
1971	5,708,000	272,000	142,000	129,000	47.5	24.9	22.6	6.70	144.4	39.56
1972	5,805,000	276,000	142,000	134,000	47.5	24.5	23.0	6.72	142.6	40.05
1973	5,908,000	282,000	143,000	139,000	47.6	24.1	23.5	6.77	140.4	40.55
1974	6,018,000	288,000	141,000	147,000	47.7	23.4	24.3	6.84	137.3	41.35
1975	6,138,000	295,000	140,000	155,000	47.9	22.7	25.2	6.91	133.6	42.31
1976	6,270,000	302,000	138,000	164,000	48.1	22.0	26.1	6.95	129.6	43.25
1977	6,417,000	312,000	137,000	175,000	48.5	21.4	27.2	7.05	125.7	44.15
1978	6,578,000	323,000	137,000	186,000	49.0	20.7	28.3	7.15	122.1	45.07
1979	6,750,000	333,000	136,000	196,000	49.2	20.2	29.0	7.19	119.0	45.90
1980	6,933,000	341,000	137,000	204,000	49.1	19.8	29.4	7.22	116.3	46.54
1981	7,124,000	350,000	139,000	211,000	49.1	19.5	29.5	7.26	114.4	46.87
1982	7,322,000	358,000	139,000	219,000	48.9	19.0	29.9	7.25	112.1	47.60
1983	7,531,000	367,000	140,000	227,000	48.7	18.6	30.1	7.25	110.3	48.09
1984	7,751,000	379,000	141,000	238,000	48.8	18.2	30.6	7.25	108.5	48.64
1985	7,979,000	390,000	143,000	247,000	48.9	17.9	30.9	7.24	106.7	48.95
1986	8,208,000	398,000	146,000	252,000	48.5	17.8	30.7	7.22	104.8	49.01
1987	8,435,000	406,000	149,000	257,000	48.0	17.7	30.4	7.17	103.1	49.06
1988	8,664,000	412,000	152,000	260,000	47.5	17.5	30.0	7.11	101.7	49.13
1989	8,895,000	419,000	155,000	265,000	47.1	17.3	29.7	7.05	100.8	49.17
1990	9,131,000	429,000	156,000	272,000	46.8	17.1	29.8	7.01	100.2	49.44
1991	9,365,000	438,000	160,000	279,000	46.7	17.0	29.7	6.97	100.0	49.45
1992	9,599,000	447,000	163,000	284,000	46.4	16.9	29.5	6.94	99.8	49.44
1993	9,840,000	455,000	167,000	288,000	46.2	17.0	29.2	6.89	99.7	49.21
1994	10,091,000	466,000	170,000	296,000	46.1	16.8	29.3	6.84	99.3	49.31
1995	10,353,000	478,000	173,000	305,000	46.0	16.7	29.4	6.81	98.7	49.45
1996	10,621,000	490,000	175,000	314,000	46.0	16.5	29.5	6.78	97.6	49.61
1997	10,897,000	500,000	180,000	319,000	45.8	16.5	29.3	6.72	96.8	49.40
1998	11,201,000	510,000	180,000	331,000	45.5	16.0	29.5	6.66	95.0	49.99
1999	11,534,000	523,000	181,000	342,000	45.3	15.7	29.6	6.59	93.6	50.33
2000	11,883,000	537,000	182,000	355,000	45.2	15.3	29.9	6.52	92.1	50.85
2001	12,250,000	549,000	185,000	364,000	44.8	15.1	29.7	6.43	90.4	51.07
2002	12,632,000	561,000	187,000	374,000	44.5	14.8	29.6	6.34	88.8	51.27
2003	13,031,000	579,000	188,000	391,000	44.5	14.4	30.0	6.28	86.7	51.79
2004	13,446,000	595,000	188,000	407,000	44.2	14.0	30.3	6.22	84.1	52.42
2005	13,876,000	614,000	187,000	426,000	44.2	13.5	30.7	6.18	81.3	53.09
2006	14,316,000	636,000	187,000	448,000	44.4	13.1	31.3	6.17	78.6	53.74
2007	14,757,000	652,000	187,000	466,000	44.2	12.6	31.5	6.11	75.8	54.38
2008	15,198,000	668,000	183,000	485,000	43.9	12.0	31.9	6.05	72.7	55.34
2009	15,650,000	682,000	182,000	500,000	43.5	11.6	31.9	5.99	70.2	55.96
2010	16,117,000	697,000	182,000	516,000	43.2	11.3	32.0	5.94	67.8	56.48
2011	16,603,000	712,000	180,000	531,000	42.8	10.8	32.0	5.87	65.5	57.13
2012	17,114,000	725,000	180,000	545,000	42.3	10.5	31.8	5.79	63.6	57.62
2013	17,636,000	736,000	182,000	554,000	41.7	10.3	31.4	5.70	61.8	57.82
2014	18,170,000	745,000	181,000	564,000	41.0	10.0	31.0	5.60	60.0	58.36
2015	18,718,000	751,000	180,000	570,000	40.1	9.6	30.5	5.48	58.3	58.85
2016	19,275,000	751,000	180,000	572,000	39.0	9.3	29.7	5.32	56.7	59.33
2017	19,836,000	752,000	181,000	571,000	37.9	9.1	28.8	5.16	55.0	59.54
2018	20,393,000	761,000	180,000	581,000	37.3	8.8	28.5	5.07	53.5	60.05
2019	20,962,000	720,000	180,000	540,000	34.3	8.6	25.8	4.68	58.7	60.2
2020	21,479,000	703,000	179,000	524,000	32.7	8.3	24.4	4.44	57.0	60,5
2021	21,995,000	713,000	186,000	527,000	32.4	8.4	24.0	4.36	55.3	60.0
2022	22,509,000	721,000	183,000	538,000	32.0	8.1	23.9	4.27	53.8	60.7
2023	23,026,000	729,000	183,000	545,000	31.6	8.0	23.7	4.19	52.3	61.1
2024					31.3	7.9	23.4	4.11		
2025					30.8	7.8	23.0	4.00		

View source data.
View source data.
View source data.
View source data.

=== Fertility ===
Total Fertility Rate (TFR) (Wanted Fertility Rate) and Crude Birth Rate (CBR):

Year	CBR (Total)	TFR (Total)	CBR (Urban)	TFR (Urban)	CBR (Rural)	TFR (Rural)
1993	43.0	6.9 (6.0)	39.0	5.0 (3.9)	43.0	7.3 (6.5)
1998–99	45.1	6.8 (6.0)	32.6	4.1 (3.4)	47.0	7.3 (6.5)
2003	42.6	6.2 (5.4)	32.4	3.7 (3.2)	44.5	6.9 (6.0)
2010	41.2	6.0 (5.2)	33.3	3.9 (3.3)	43.3	6.7 (5.9)
2014	38.6	5.5	33.6	4.0	40.2	6.1
2017-18	35.1	5.2	30.9	3.7	36.1	5.6
2021	30.7	4.4 (4.2)	28.4	3.4 (3.3)	31.6	4.9 (4.6)

Fertility data as of 2013 (DHS Program):

Region	Total fertility rate	Percentage of women age 15-49 currently pregnant	Mean number of children ever born to women age 40–49
Centre	3.7	6.8	5.3
Boucle du Mouhoun	6.8	10.8	7.1
Cascades	6.0	10.4	7.0
Centre-Est	6.3	8.1	6.6
Centre-Nord	6.7	10.7	7.1
Centre-Ouest	6.4	10.4	7.1
Centre-Sud	5.6	9.4	6.8
Est	7.5	15.0	7.9
Hauts Bassins	5.2	9.3	5.9
Nord	6.2	10.3	7.0
Plateau Central	5.8	9.4	6.8
Sahel	7.5	12.9	7.6
Sud-ouest	6.4	10.8	7.1

Years	1925	1926	1927	1928	1929	1930	1931	1932	1933	1934
Total Fertility Rate in Burkina Faso	6.11	6.11	6.10	6.10	6.10	6.09	6.09	6.09	6.09	6.08

Years	1935	1936	1937	1938	1939	1940	1941	1942	1943	1944
Total Fertility Rate in Burkina Faso	6.08	6.08	6.07	6.07	6.07	6.06	6.06	6.06	6.06	6.05

Years	1945	1946	1947	1948	1949
Total Fertility Rate in Burkina Faso	6.05	6.05	6.04	6.04	6.04

=== Life expectancy at birth ===
Life expectancy in Burkina Faso, 1950 to 2019

total population: 63.44 years
male: 61.63 years
female: 65.31 years (2022 est.)

Total population: 63.06 years
Male: 61.28 years
Female: 64.89 years (2021 est.)

== Ethnic groups ==
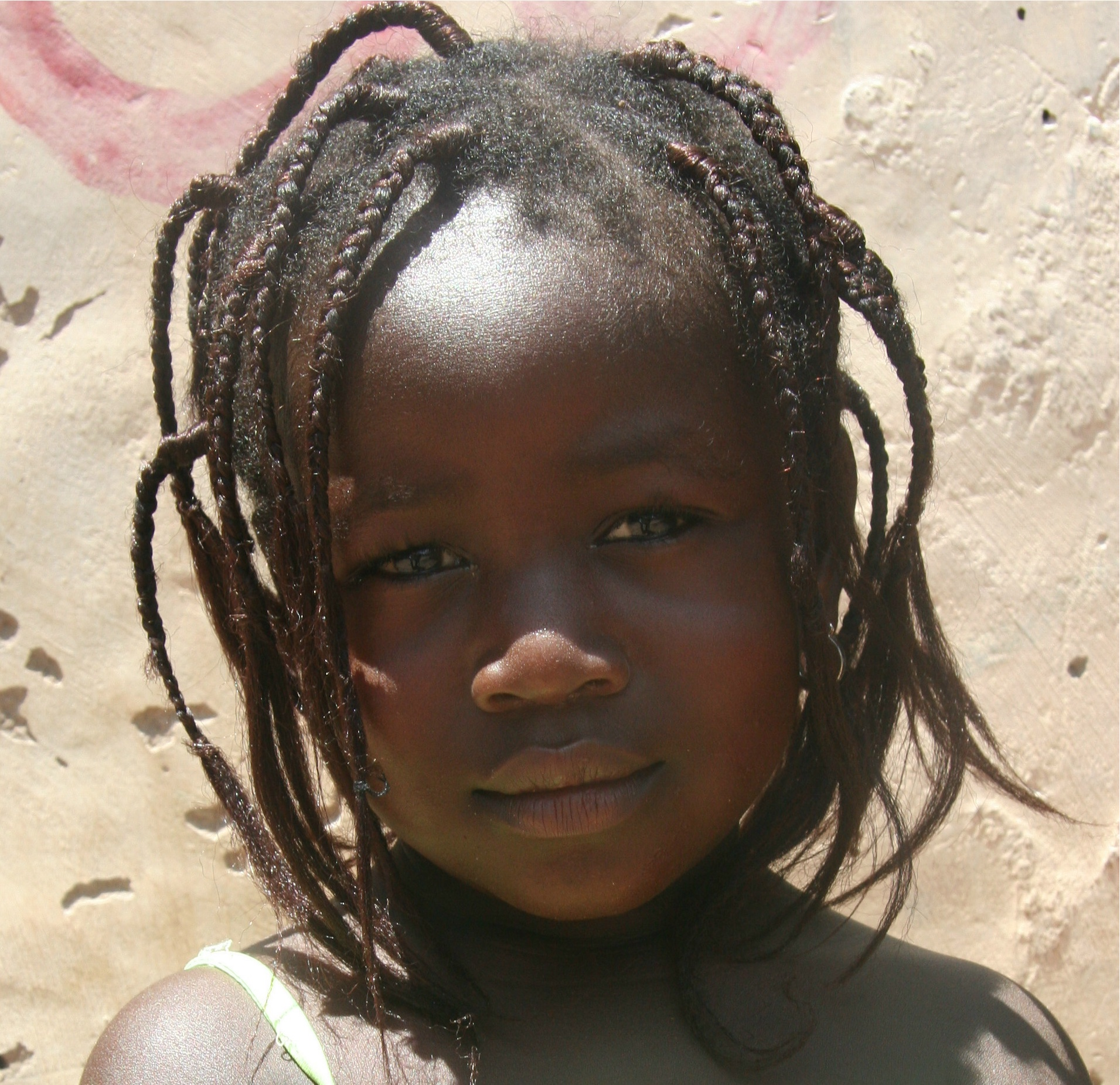
A girl from Burkina Faso

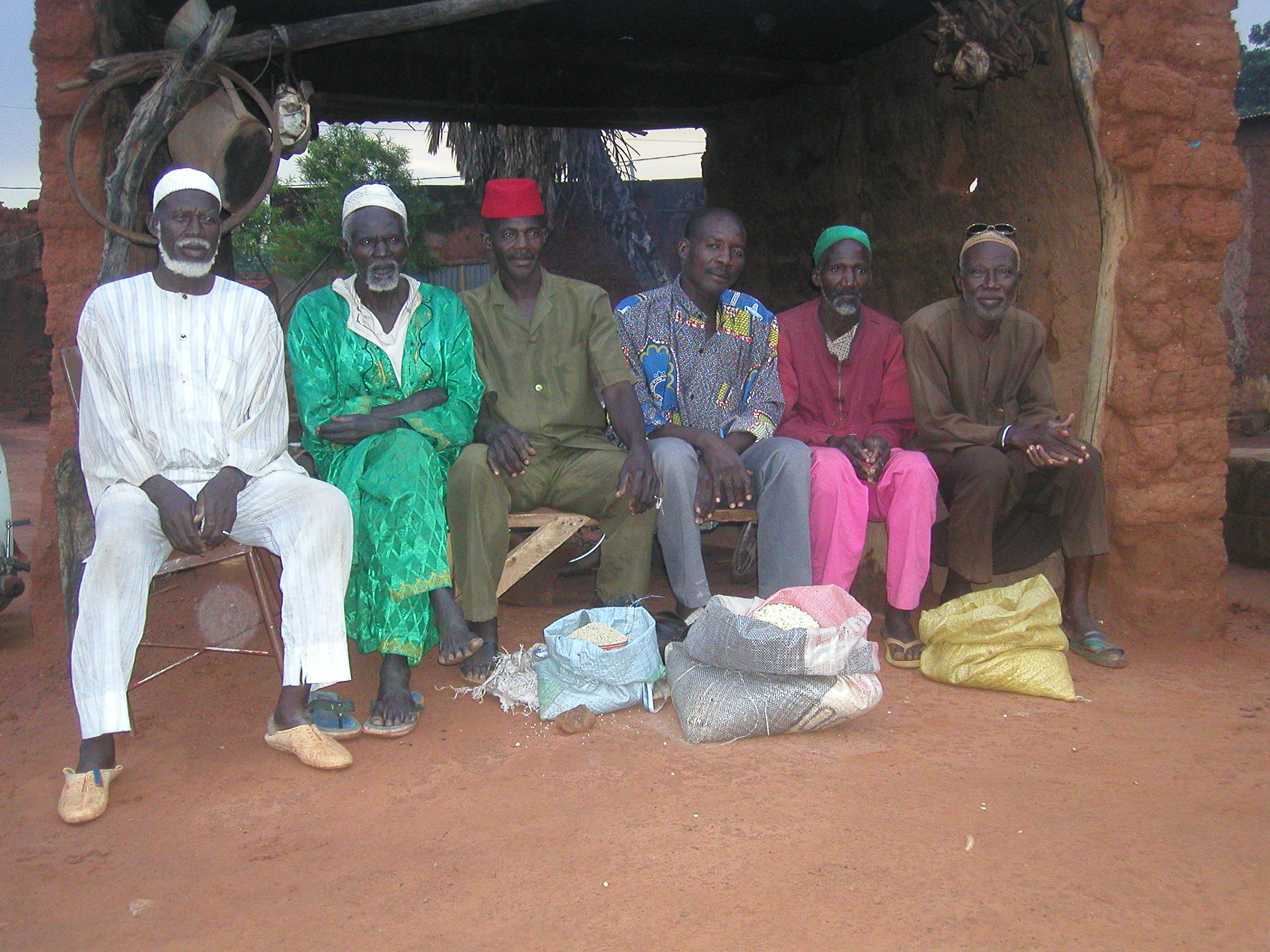
Bobo men in Bobo-Dioulasso

Mossi 53.7%, Fulani (Peuhl) 6.8%, Gurunsi 5.9%, Bissa 5.4%, Gurma 5.2%, Bobo 3.4%, Senufo 2.2%, Bissa 1.5%, Lobi 1.5%, Tuareg/Bella 0.1%, other 12.8%, foreign 0.7% (2021 est.)

== Languages ==
French(working), native African languages belonging to Sudanic family spoken by 90% of the population

== Religion ==
Religion in Burkina Faso (2017-2018)
1. Islam (63.2%)
2. Roman Catholic (24.6%)
3. Protestant (6.90%)
4. Animism (4.20%)
5. Other and none (1.10%)

Islam 61.5%, Roman Catholic 23.3%, Traditional/Animist 7.8%, Protestant 6.5%, Other/No Answer 0.2%, None 0.7% (2010 est.)
