= Christianity in Burkina Faso =

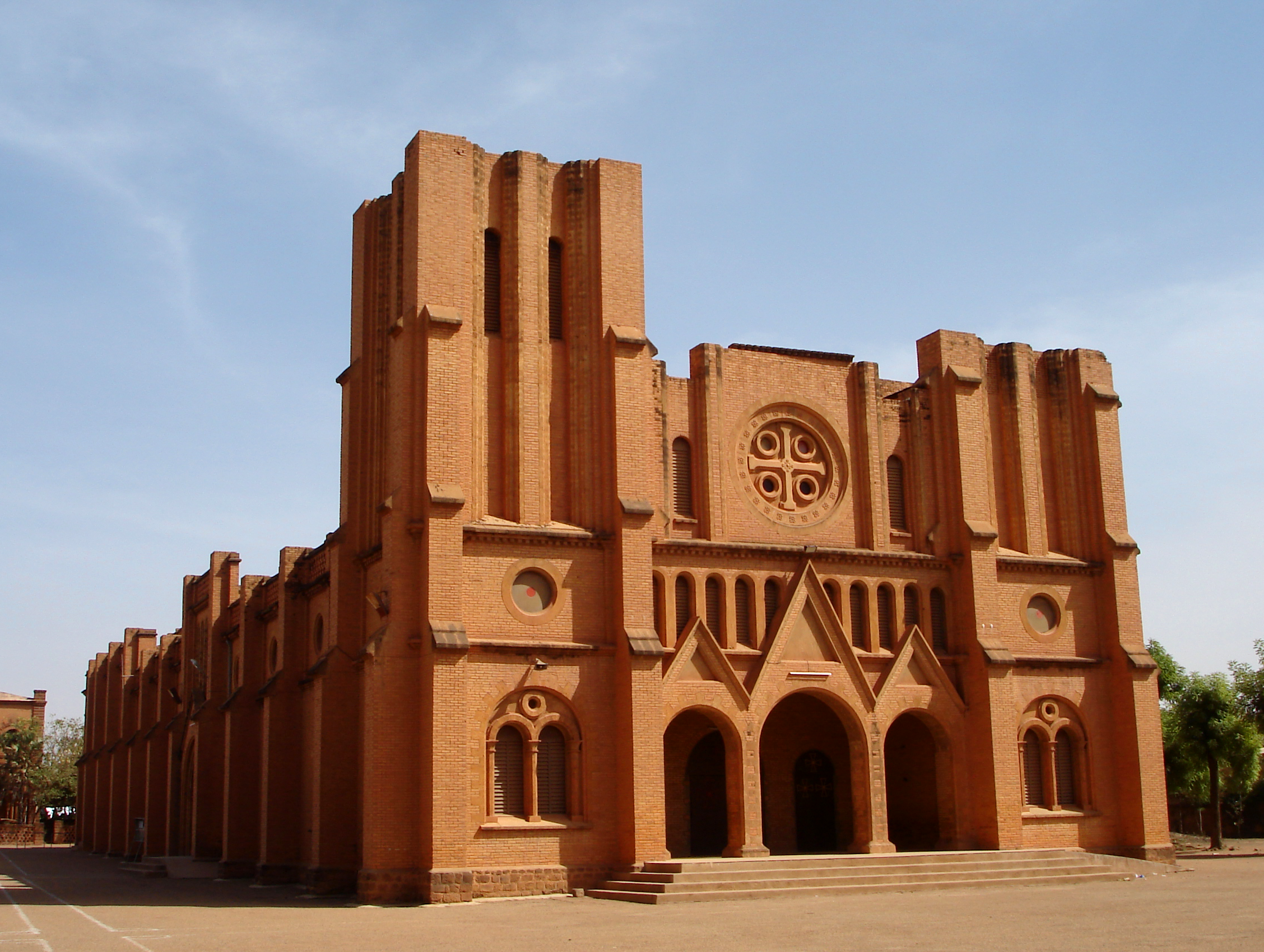
The Cathedral of Ouagadougou, a Roman Catholic church in Burkina Faso.

Christianity is the second largest religion in Burkina Faso, representing more than a quarter of the population (26.3%); 20.1% of the Christian population reports to be Roman Catholic while 6.2% self-describe as Protestant according to the 2019 census. However, exact percentages are difficult to accurately predict due to a high degree of syncretism that occurs in the country between Christianity, Islam, and traditional indigenous beliefs.

== Representation in government ==
Although Christians represent a minority of the overall population, they are overrepresented in civil government. Heads of State and Heads of Government of Burkina Faso who were Christians include Thomas Sankara, Saye Zerbo, Blaise Compaoré, Paul Kaba Thieba, and Roch Marc Christian Kaboré.

== Persecution ==
Although interfaith relations between Muslims and Christians in Burkina Faso have historically been amicable, since 2015 there have been increasing attacks on Christians by Salafi jihadists, which have increased further since 2017. In April 2019, Islamist gunmen killed five Protestant worshipers and their pastor as they were leaving church after a service in the village of Silgadji near Mali. In May 2019, four Catholics were killed by islamists during a Marian procession in Zimtenga Department. In August 2019, four Christians were executed by extremists in Bani Department for wearing crucifixes. On 1 December 2019 at least 14 churchgoers were killed in an attack when suspected islamist gunmen opened fire on the church during a service. On 17 February 2020, a group of gunmen attacked a Protestant church where services were being held in the village of Pansi, killing 24 attendees.

In an interview with Catholic charitable organization Aid to the Church in Need, Fr. Pierre Rouamba claimed that in 2022 Burkina Faso was the country with the most anti-Christian attacks in the world. In the same interview, given in August 2023, he claimed that "for the Christians we accompany, the time perspective does not go beyond the next 24 hours. We do not know if we will survive beyond the next day."

In 2023, Burkina Faso was ranked as the 23rd worst country to be a Christian. In the same year, Burkina Faso scored 3 out of 4 for religious freedom. In January, shortly after the murder of a Catholic priest at the hands of insurgents, the bishop of Dori, Laurent Dabiré, claimed that 50% of the country was under the effective control of jihadist insurgents.

At least 15 Christians were killed in an attack on 25 February 2024 in Essakane, in the diocese of Dori. According to bishop Justin Kientega of Ouahigouya: “There were 47 people in the Chapel for Sunday morning celebration of the Word, led by their catechist. There were 17 men and the rest were women and children. The terrorists came and killed 12 – 9 people were killed at the chapel and 3 others died from their injuries – all males, but there were also two children among the dead, a four-year-old and a 14-year-old.” In April of the same year Edouard Yougbare, a catechist from the parish of Saatenga in Fada Gourma, was abducted by terrorists and murdered.

== See also ==
- Religion in Burkina Faso
- Freedom of religion in Burkina Faso
- Roman Catholicism in Burkina Faso
