= Chantal Kaboré-Zoungrana =

Burkinabé animal nutritionist and biosecurity expert

Chantal Yvette Kaboré-Zoungrana (née Kaboré) is a Burkinabé animal nutritionist and biosecurity expert. She is a professor at the University of Ouagadougou and former head of the national Burkina Faso National Biosafety Agency (Agence Nationale de la Biosécurité).

== Academic career ==
Kaboré-Zoungrana studied for her doctorate at the Pierre and Marie Curie University, Paris, in 1982. She earned a further doctorate in her home city at the University of Ouagadougou in 1995. While she was based at Nazi Boni University, Kaboré-Zoungrana investigated the effects of plant nutrition on livestock, including measuring the health of sheep consuming native plants Afzelia africana, Pterocarpus erinaceus or Khaya senegalensis when obtained during different seasons.

She was promoted to full professorship in 2008 in the Rural Department of the University of Ouagadougou. Kaboré-Zoungrana has at different times served as Head of the Animal Production Department, Director of the Institute of Rural Development, Director of the Institute of Nature and Life Science at the university. Kaboré-Zoungrana is Fellow and Member of the Board of the National Academy of Sciences, Arts and Letters of Burkina Faso, and was elected a Fellow of the African Academy of Sciences in 2018.

== Biosecurity ==
In 2008 Kaboré-Zoungrana became Director-General of the National Biosafety Agency. As part of this role Kaboré-Zoungrana announced the trialling of genetically modified cotton in association with Monsanto, an important crop for Burkina Faso, in 2011. However the agency under her leadership also did not renew Monsanto's license to grow Bt cotton in Burkina Faso amid concerns over quality, actual-vs-predicted gains and financial benefits for farmers. She has published on how to advocate and educate the use of genetically modified crops in sub-Saharan Africa, where many countries have banned the use of these crops.

She oversaw the implementation of a Target Malaria project to release sterile male mosquitoes, carrying a gene drive to spread the sterility through the native population, in rural areas of Burkina Faso in order to reduce the mosquito population. In 2019 Kaboré-Zoungrana also opened a new National Biosafety Laboratory on the Institut de l'Environnement et Recherches Agricoles campus in Ouagadougou, alongside Prof Alkassoum Maiga, Minister of Higher Education, Scientific Research and Innovation. Kaboré-Zoungrana retired from this role in 2019 and was succeeded by Prof Nicolas Barro.
