= Aminata Ouédraogo =

Burkinabé filmmaker and administrator

- Born: Burkinabé
- Education: Institut Africain d'Education Cinématographique (INAFEC). Film school at the University of Ouagadougou. Institut du Multimedia et Architecture de la Communication (IMAC) in Paris
- Alma mater: University of Ouagadougou
- Occupation(s): Filmmaker and administrator
- Notable work: Alcoolisme, 1992

Aminata Ouédraogo is a Burkinabé filmmaker and administrator. She is general coordinator of the Pan-African Union of Women in the Image Industry (UPAFI).

== Life ==
Ouédraogo studied at the Institut Africain d'Education Cinématographique (INAFEC), a film school at the University of Ouagadougou, before studying at the Institut du Multimedia et Architecture de la Communication (IMAC) in Paris.

Ouédraogo has advised the Panafrican Film and Television Festival of Ouagadougou (FESPACO). In 1991, at the 12th FESPACO, she created the Association of African Women Professionals in Cinema, Television and Video (AFAPCTV). In 1995 the AFAPCTV was restructured as the Pan-African Union of Women in the Image Industry (UPAFI), with Ouédraogo as general coordinator. She is technical advisor to the Minister of Culture and Tourism in Burkina Faso.

== Filmography ==
- L'impasse, 1988. Fiction.
- A qui le tour?, 1991. Documentary
- Ak Patashi (Qui m'a poussé), 1992. Documentary.
- Alcoolisme, 1992. Documentary.
