= Zoungrana (surname) =

Zoungrana is a surname. Notable people with the name include:

- Chantal Kaboré-Zoungrana, Burkinabé animal nutritionist and biosecurity expert
- Paul Zoungrana (1917–2000), Burkinabé Cardinal of the Roman Catholic Church
- Valentin Zoungrana (born 1992), Burkinabé footballer
