= Higher Institute of Medical Technology =

- Institut supérieur de technologie médicale
- Type: Private university
- Established: 2007
- Location: Yaoundé, Cameroon
- Affiliations: University of Douala, Nazi Boni University

The Higher Institute of Medical Technology (ISTM) is a Cameroonian higher education institution established in 2007. It is one of the three private institutions authorized to train students in medicine.

== History ==
ISTM received an agreement for its creation by decree No. 05/0087/MINESUP dated September 7, 2005. It was officially established in 2007 by authorization No. 07/0130/MINESUP dated September 21, 2007. In 2010, it added Bachelor's, Master's, and Doctoral programs with the agreement letter No. 000027/MINESUP/CA/IGA/EPC/CA dated January 2010.

Jean Marie Thomas Ningouloubel is the promoter and serves as the president of the institution's board.

== Programs offered ==
Four degree-granting specialties are offered at the institute:

- General medicine
- Public health
- Biomedical sciences
- Physiotherapy

== Facilities ==
ISTM has a multimedia room, a laboratory, a campus, and a teaching hospital that was officially inaugurated on June 19, 2018.

== Partnerships ==
- Administrative supervision: Ministry of Higher Education
- Academic supervision: University of Douala
- Nazi Boni University
