= Education in Burkina Faso =

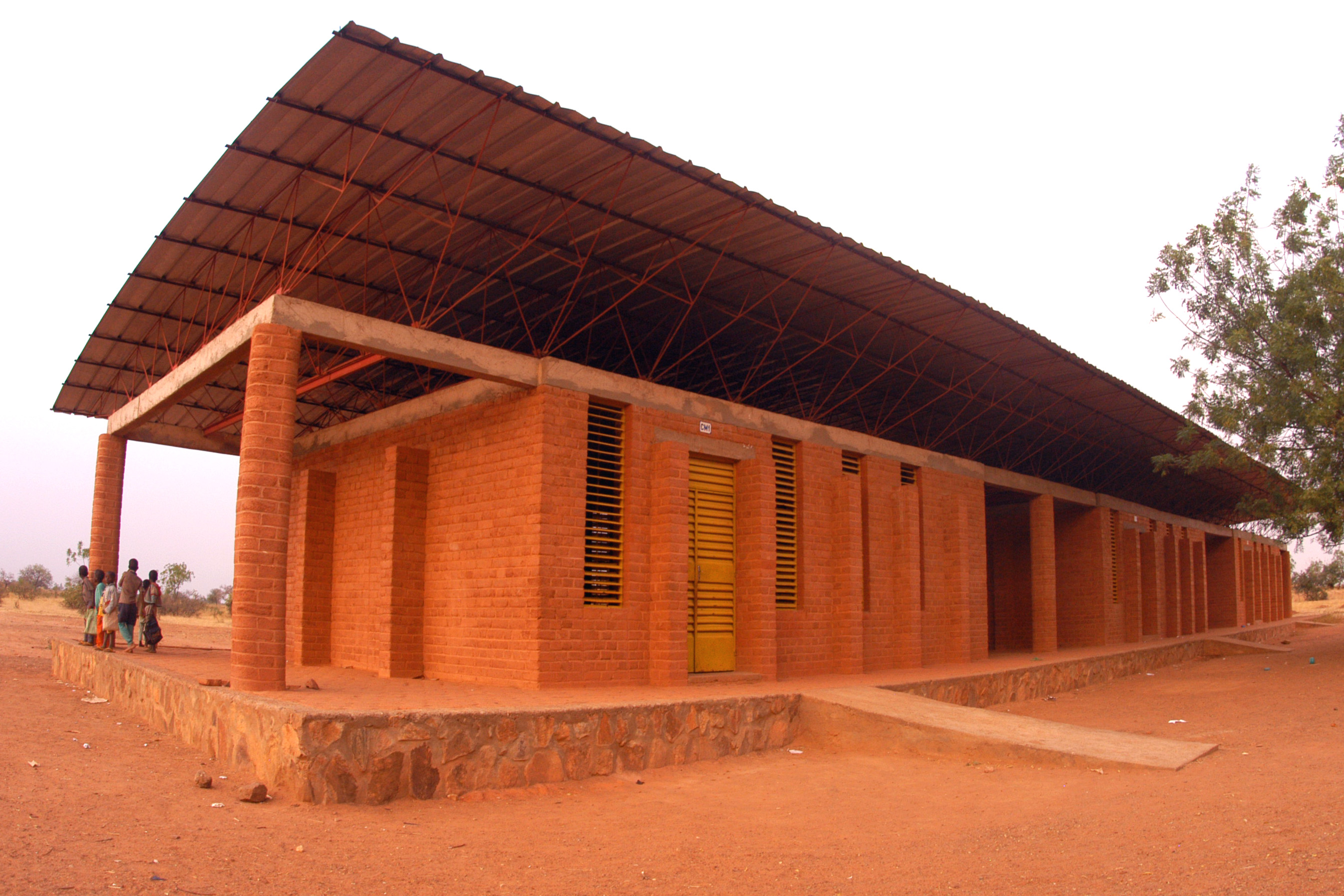
Primary school in Gando, Burkina Faso

Education in Burkina Faso is structured in much the same way as in the rest of the world: primary, secondary, and higher education. As of 2008, despite efforts to improve education, the country had the lowest adult literacy rate in the world (25.3%).

The Human Rights Measurement Initiative (HRMI) finds that Burkina Faso is fulfilling only 61.2% of what it should be fulfilling for the right to education based on the country's level of income. HRMI breaks down the right to education by looking at the rights to both primary education and secondary education. While taking into consideration Burkina Faso's income level, the nation is achieving 78.0% of what should be possible based on its resources (income) for primary education but only 44.3% for secondary education.

== Primary and secondary ==
The Education Act makes schooling compulsory from age 6 to 16. The official language for education is French.

By law, education is free, but the government does not have adequate resources to provide universal free primary education. Children are required to pay for school supplies, and communities are frequently responsible for constructing primary school buildings and teachers’ housing. Children from poor families can continue to receive tuition-free education through junior high and high school, if their grades qualify.

In 2002, the gross primary enrollment rate was 46 percent, and the net primary enrollment rate was 36 percent. Gross and net enrollment ratios are based on the number of students formally registered in primary school and therefore do not necessarily reflect actual school attendance. In 1998, 26.5 percent of children ages 6 to 14 years were attending school. As of 2001, 66 percent of children who started primary school were likely to reach grade 5.

School conditions are usually reasonable with very basic equipment. Legally the size limit for one class is 65 students, but in many rural areas classes are much bigger because of the lack of schools. If a school is full, children may get turned away and will have to try again the next year.

There is an International School of Ouagadougou open to foreign nationals and Burkinabè.

=== School session ===
A week runs from Monday to Saturday, with the schools closed on Thursday. Burkina Faso has a national curriculum. The subjects taught include Production, where children may learn to plant maize and trees or keep chickens, on school land. They have a break between noon and 3pm.

== Higher education ==
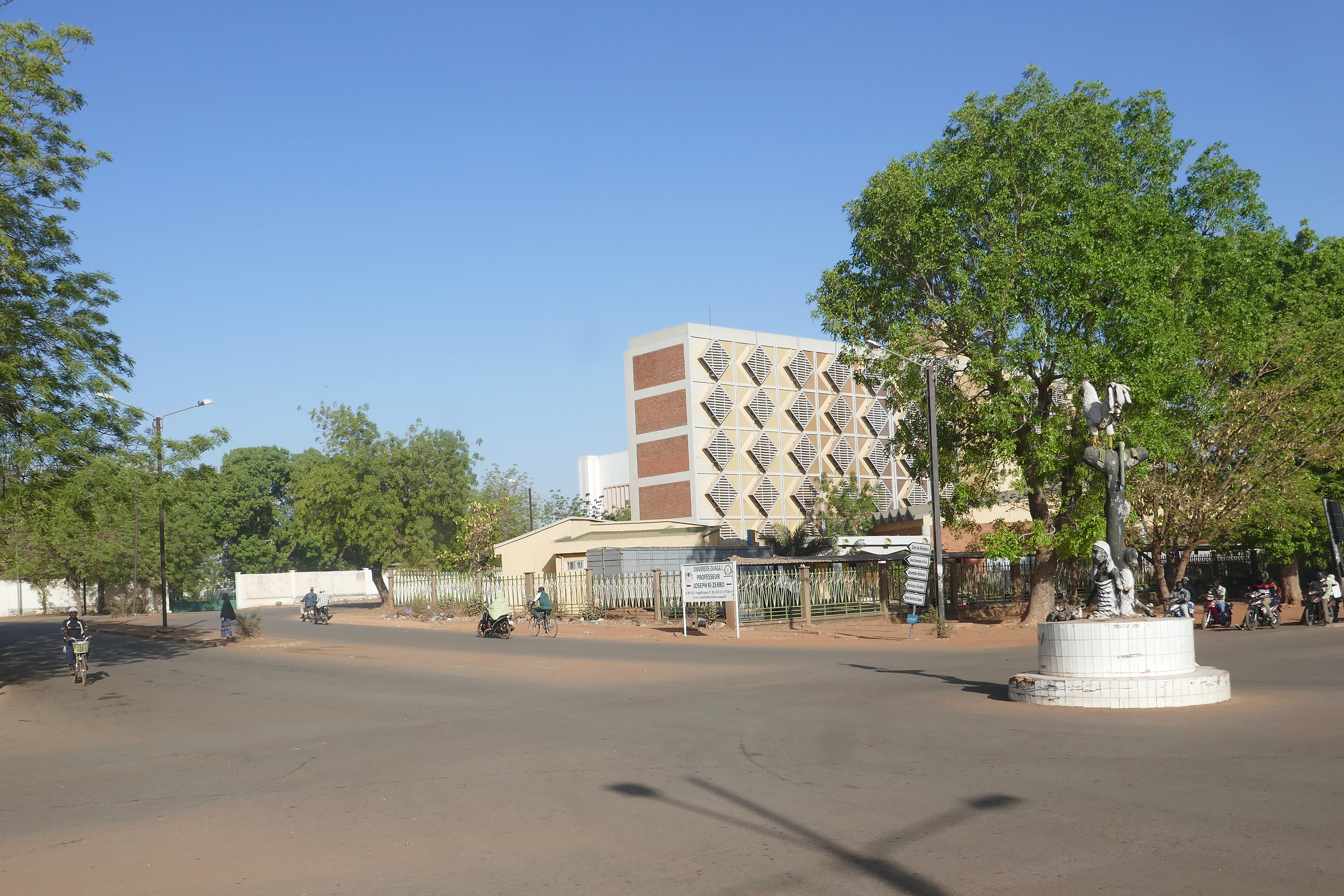
University of Ouagadougou

As of 2010 there were three main public universities in Burkina Faso: The Polytechnic University of Bobo-Dioulasso, the University of Koudougou and the University of Ouagadougou. The first private higher education institution was established in 1992 and the Université Libre de Ouagadougou began operations in 2000. The Université Catholique de l'Afrique de l'Ouest opened its Burkina campus in Bobo-Dioulasso in 2000 with a food and agriculture speciality, and the Catholic Université Saint-Thomas-d'Aquin in 2004 in Ouagadougou. Supervision rates are different from one university to another. At the University of Ouagadougou there is one lecturer for every 24 students, while at The Polytechnic University of Bobo-Dioulasso they have one lecturer for every three students.

Higher education provision is highly centralized in Ouagadougou. In 2010/2011 the University of Ouagadougou had around 40,000 students (83% of the national population of university students), the University of Koudougou had 5,600 students, and the Polytechnic University of Bobo-Dioulasso had 2,600. The private universities each had less than 1,000 students.

The University of Ouagadougou closed its doors for two months in 2008, following student protests about working conditions and non-payment of their grants. One outcome was the creation of University of Ouagadougou II 20km away at Saaba, to relieve pressure on overcrowded facilities. It now teaches the law, politics, economics and management students formerly at the main campus and students receive University of Ouagadougou degrees. There are also online classes through the Institut de Formation Ouverte à Distance (IFOAD).

In 2014, University of Ouagadougou received funding from OPEC for new facilities. None of the country's universities are ranked in higher education listings like the Time Higher World Universities, probably because the language of instruction is French, lecturers do not have time for much research, there is reliance on international aid to support some aspects of public education, and class sizes at the main public university are large. Nonetheless, there are opportunities to study right through to doctoral level.

=== Administration ===
The University Ouagadougou and Bobo-Dioulasso are composed of five levels of decision making: the board of directors, the university assembly, the university council, institutions, and departments.

== Influencing factors ==
- The number of actual schools (for primary)
- A shortage of qualified instructors (for higher education)
- Families have to pay for school supplies and school fees
- Families have very low income
- Sending a child (or children) to school limits the money being earned for the family
- Many families are only able to send one child to school, leaving the others to earn money for the family. They usually send the oldest able male.
- Language barrier. Education is mainly conducted in French, which only 15% of Burkinabè can speak, rather than in first languages of the country.
