= Abdoulaye Diabaté =

Abdoulaye Diabaté may refer to:

- Abdoulaye Diabaté (singer) (born 1956), Malian singer and guitarist
- Abdoulaye Diabaté (pianist) (1959–2025), Senegalese jazz pianist
- Abdoulaye Diabaté (scientist), Burkinabe parasitologist
