= Minata Samaté Cessouma =

Burkinabè diplomat (born 1961)

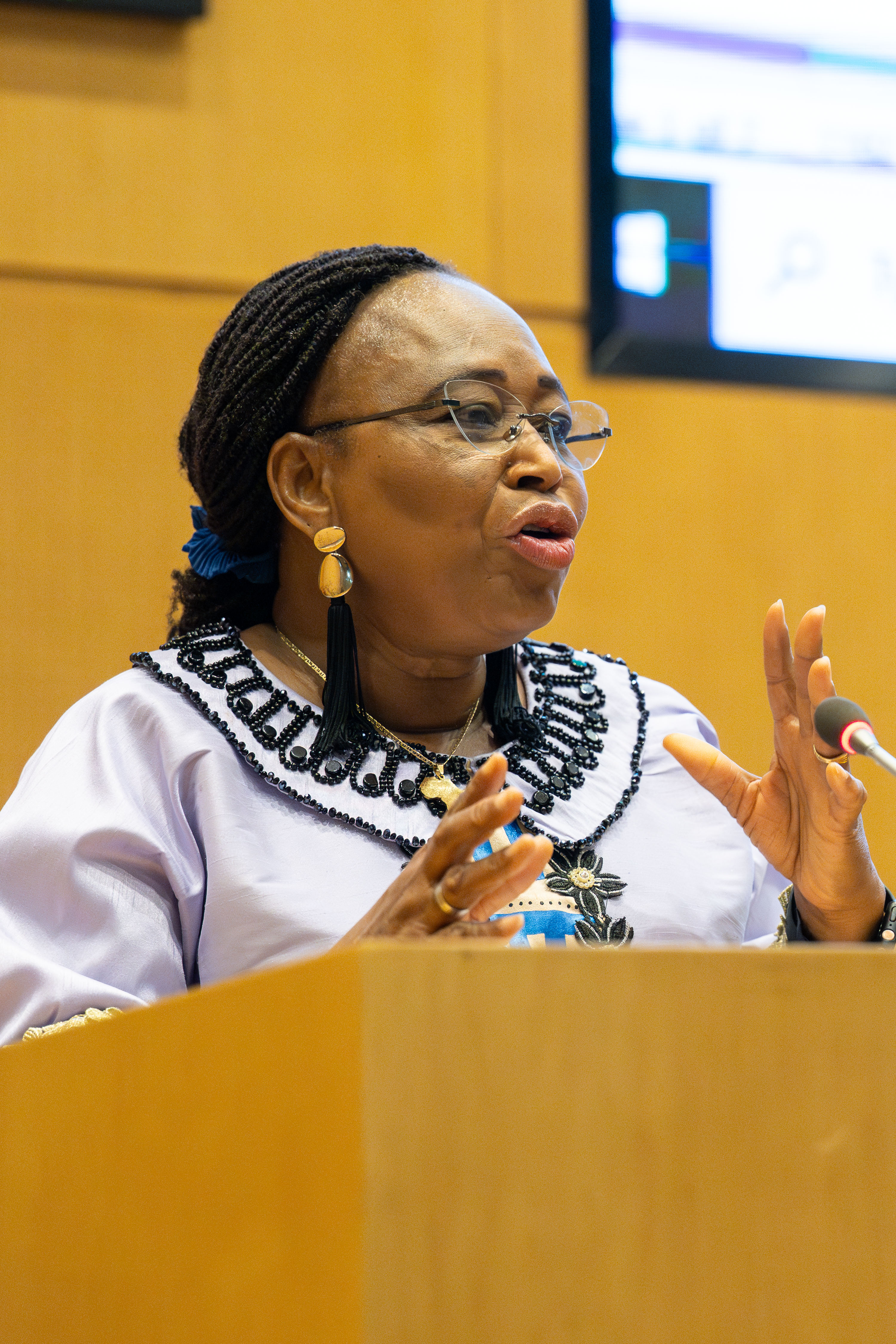

Commissioner for the African Union Department of Health, Humanitarian Affairs and Social Development
- In office 15 October 2021 – February 2025
- President: Félix Tshisekedi; Macky Sall; Azali Assoumani; Mohamed Ould Ghazouani
- Succeeded by: Amma Twum-Amoah

Personal details
- Born: 14 July 1961 (age 65) N'Dorola, Burkina Faso
- Children: 4
- Education: Paris 1 Panthéon-Sorbonne University; University of Ouagadougou; National School of Administration and Magistracy
- Occupation: Diplomat

Minata Samaté Cessouma (born 14 July 1961) is a Burkinabè diplomat. She served as Extraordinary and Plenipotentiary Ambassador of Burkina Faso to Ethiopia and Rwanda, Permanent Representative to the African Union (AU), and as Representative to the United Nations Economic Commission for Africa (UNECA).

Samaté was also formerly the AU's Commissioner for Political Affairs, then Commissioner for the African Union Department of Health, Humanitarian Affairs and Social Development (HHS). She has also worked as Diplomatic Advisor to the President of Burkina Faso and as State Minister of Foreign Affairs and Regional Cooperation [fr] for Burkina Faso.

== Biography ==
Samaté was born on 14 July 1961 in N'Dorola, Burkina Faso. She has studied at the Paris 1 Panthéon-Sorbonne University, the University of Ouagadougou and the National School of Administration and Magistracy in Ouagadougou.

Samaté is a career diplomat and began her civil service career in 1994. She served as Charge d’affairs of the Embassy Burkina Faso from October 1997 to August 2003. Samaté was then a Diplomatic Advisor to the President of Burkina Faso, Blaise Compaoré, from November 2003 to June 2007.

Samaté was the Deputy Minister of Foreign Affairs and Regional Cooperation for Burkina Faso from June 2007 to April 2011. In this role, she chaired the Economic Community of West African States (ECOWAS) Council of Ministers and Mediation and Security Council (MSC), as well serving as co-chair of ECOWAS's European Union Troika Meetings. ECOWAS is one of the pillar regional blocs of the continent-wide African Economic Community (AEC).

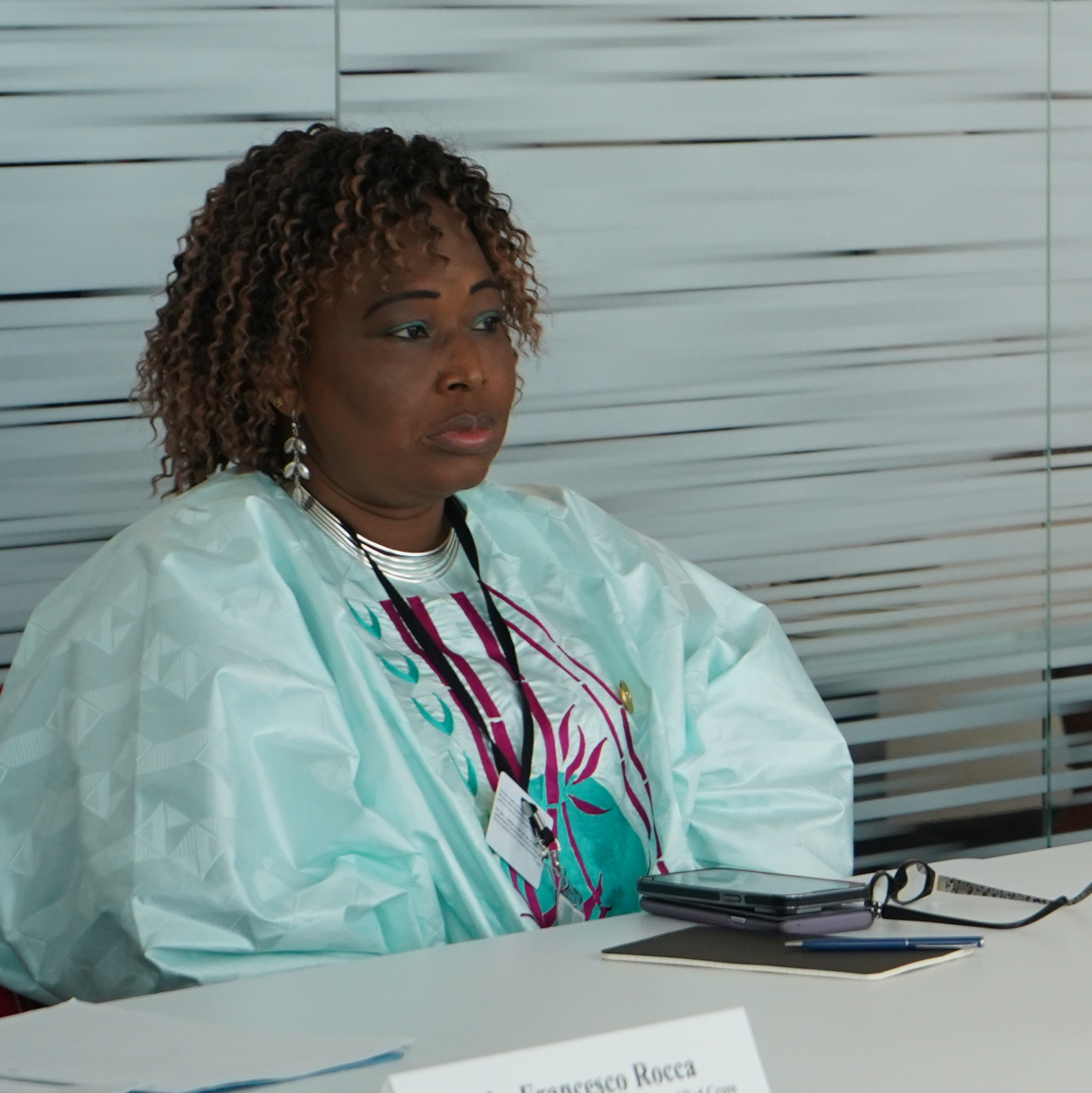
Samate at the Responding to the Urgent Humanitarian Needs in the Horn of Africa event in 2022

Samaté was appointed Extraordinary and Plenipotentiary Ambassador of Burkina Faso to Ethiopia and Rwanda with residence in Addis Ababa in September 2011, presenting her credentials to President of Rwanda Paul Kagame. She was also appointed Permanent Representative to the African Union (AU) and Representative to the United Nations Economic Commission for Africa (UNECA). She held these roles until May 2014. In 2012, Samaté launched a Special Peace and Security Award for the annual Pan-African Film and Television Festival in Ouagadougou on behalf of the AU.

Samaté was Director of the Joint Coordination Mechanism for Support to the United Nations/African Union Hybrid Mission in Darfur, Sudan, (JSCM/UNAMID), from June 2014 to July 2015. She was elected as the Commissioner for Political Affairs at the AU from 2017 to 2021.

In 2019, Samaté was named among the inaugural "List of 100 Most Influential African Women" by Avance Media. In February 2020, she launched the book She Stands for Peace: 20 Years, 20 Journeys with Special Representative of the UN Secretary-General to the African Union, Hanna Tetteh, at an event in Addis Ababa.

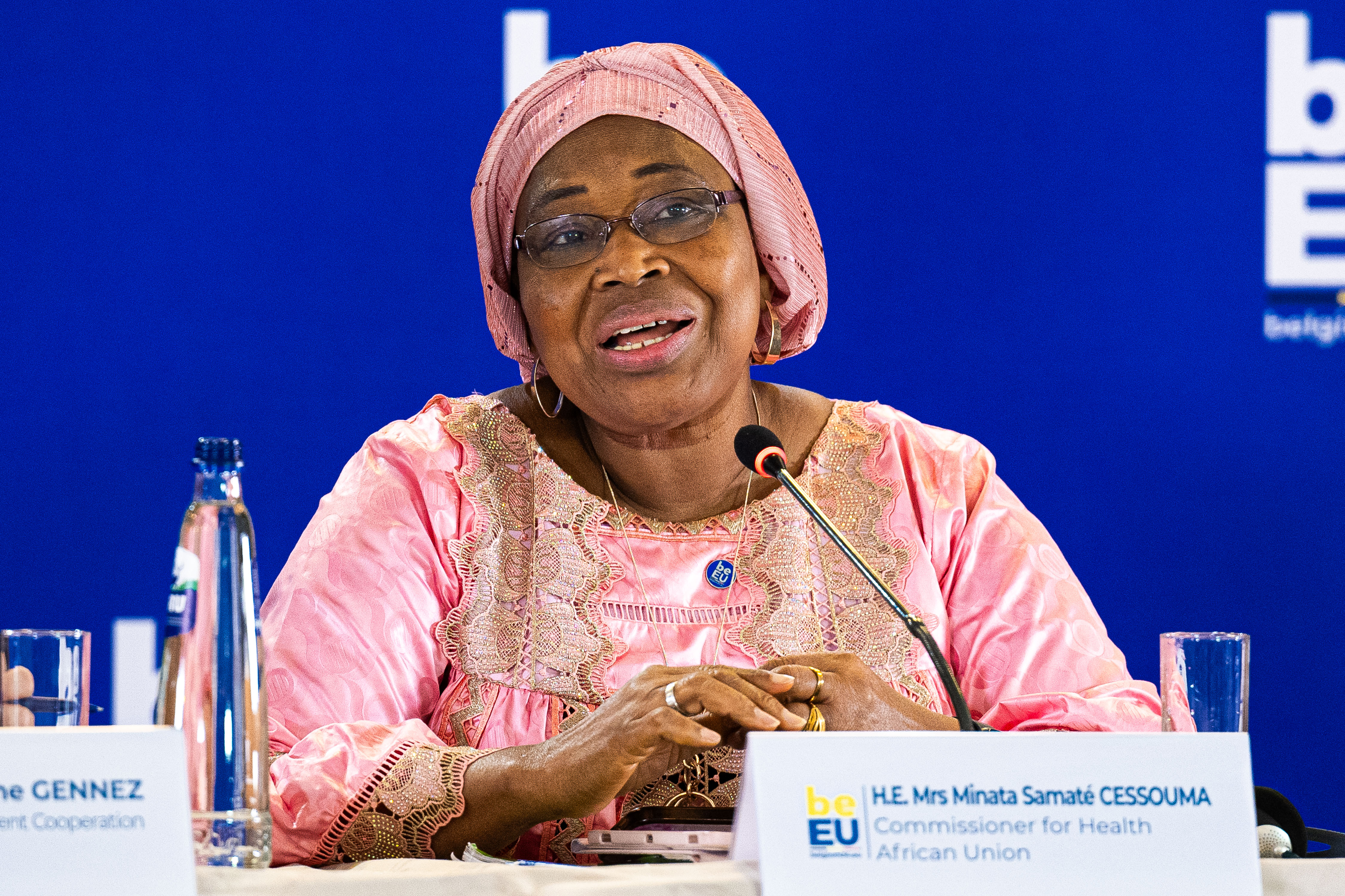
Samaté at the European Union-African High-Level evenement on health event in 2024, held at Egmont Palace in Brussels, Belgium

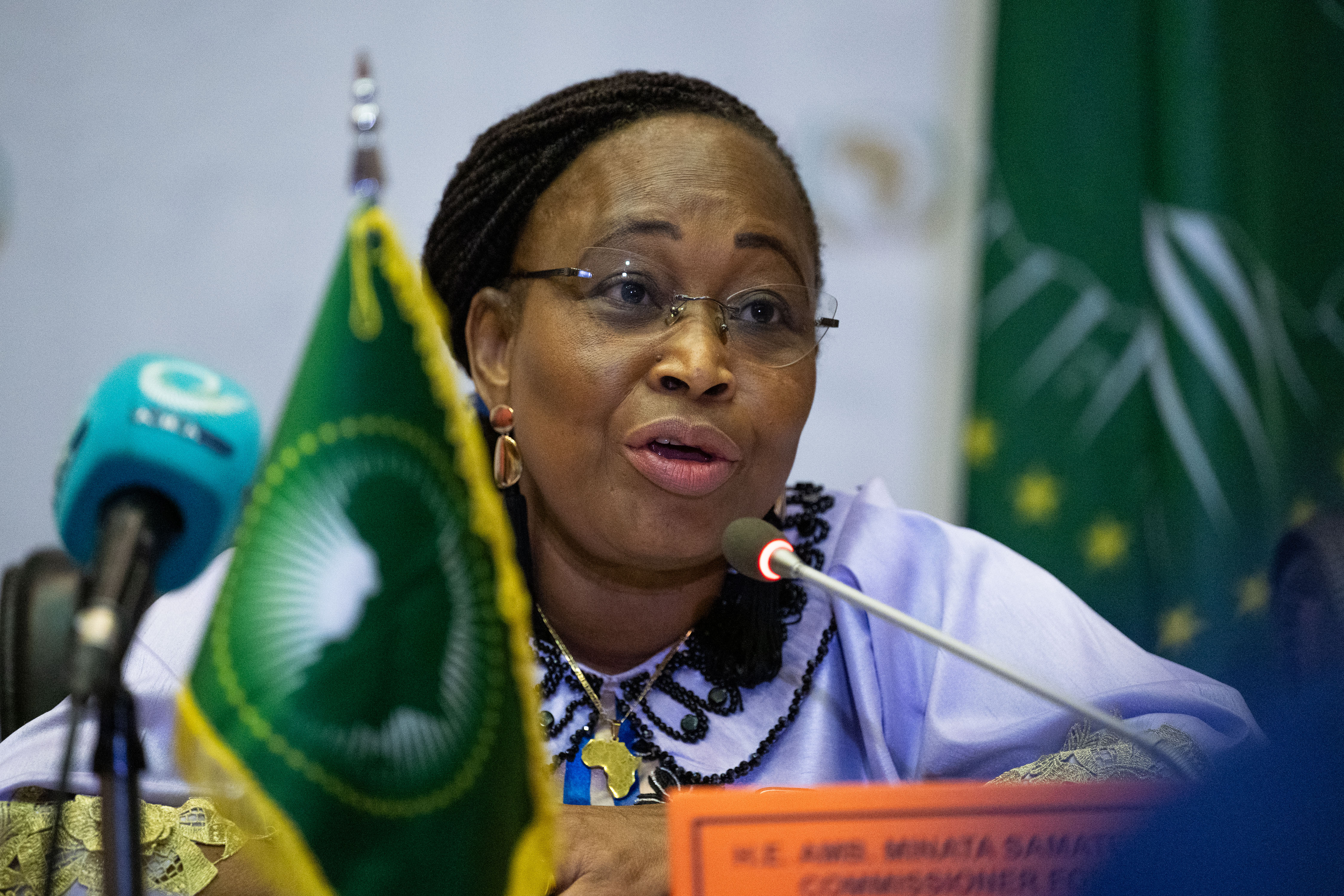
Samaté at the Team Europe mission on Health event in Addis Ababa, Ethiopia

On 15 October 2021, Samaté was elected Commissioner for the Health, Humanitarian Affairs and Social Development at the AU, with 45 out of 46 votes. Samaté served until February 2025 and was succeeded by Ghanaian diplomat Amma Twum-Amoah. In the role, in February 2023 Samaté represented the AU as a signer of a "Memorandum of Understanding to foster collaboration and support Africa’s efforts to end AIDS and tuberculosis (TB) by 2030," alongside a representative from the Elizabeth Glaser Pediatric AIDS Foundation (EGPAF). She also endorsed the International Hepato-Pancreato-Biliary Association's African Viral Hepatitis Convention, has spoken at events on "Investing in African Health Security," and has praised health related cooperation between the nations of Africa and China.

In 2023, Samaté signed a Memorandum of Understanding (MoU) on behalf of the AU, with Vivienne Lawack of the University of the Western Cape, to work in partnership with the university towards the "Africa Union Agenda 2063" including launching a new Master degree in Migration Studies.

Samaté also met with heads of state, such as the President of Togo, Faure Gnassingbé, urged African states to donate art objects and previously looted African cultural property to the Great Museum of Africa, and formalised a partnerships between the AU and music organisations including the annual All-Africa Music Awards (AFRIMA) and the Music In Africa Foundation (MIAF).

In November 2024, Samaté was appointed to the Board of Directors of the non-profit organisation Nutrition International. She has spoken at international events including on the "Indigenous Knowledge for Global Health Solutions; Harnessing African Leadership, Artificial Intelligence, and Policy Development for Equitable Impact" panel at the 2024 Science Summit in New York, United States.

In June 2025, Samaté was elected Chair of the African Leaders Malaria Alliance (ALMA) board, succeeding Adolphine Kateka.
