= Abdoulaye Diabaté (scientist) =

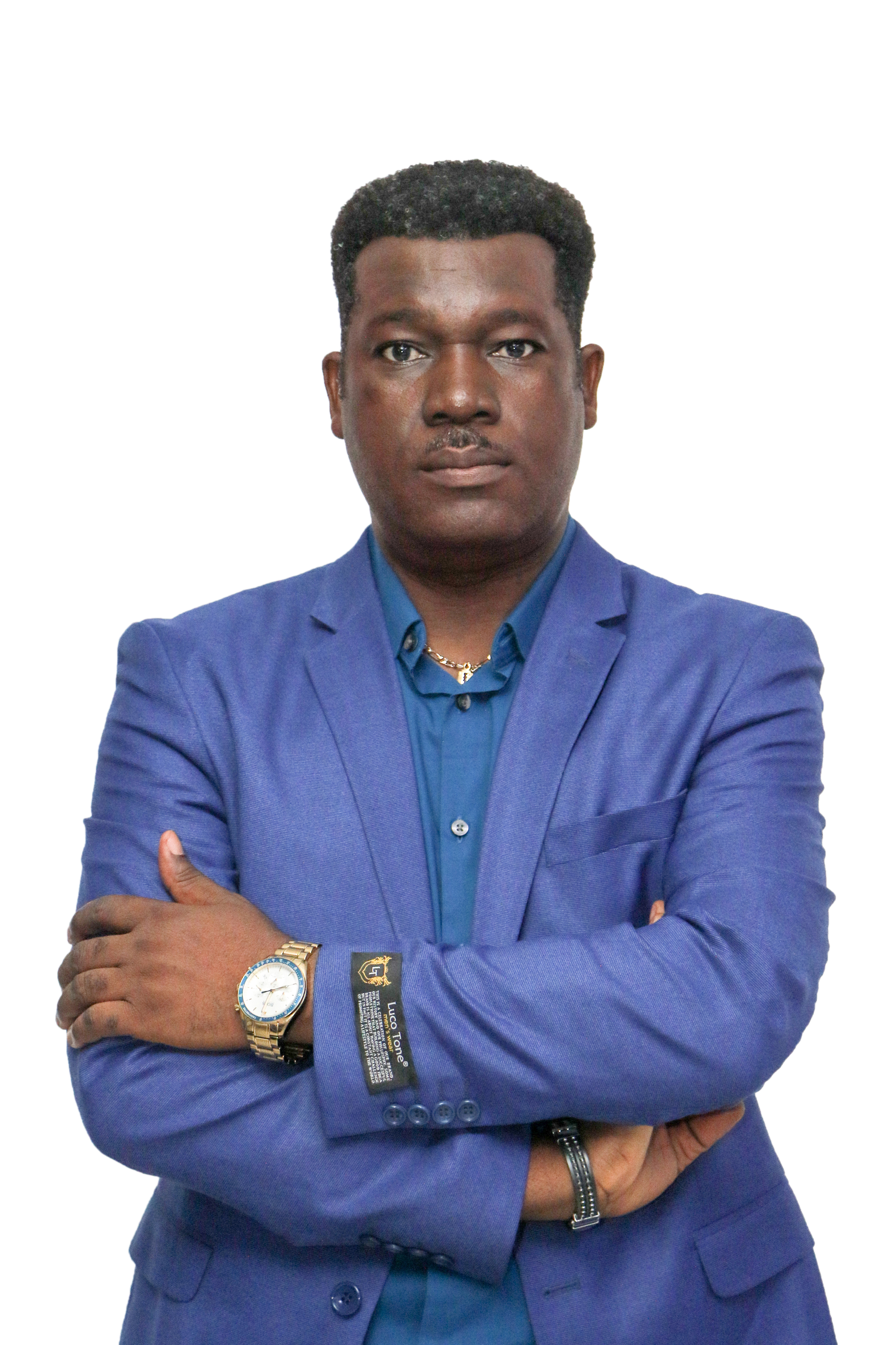
- Born: Burkina Faso
- Education: University of Montpellier II; University of Ouagadougou
- Scientific career
- Workplaces: National Institutes of Health
- Thesis: Le paludisme au Burkina Faso : étude de la transmission et répartition géographique de la résistance d'"Anopheles gambiae" SL aux pyréthrinoïdes (2003)

Abdoulaye Diabaté is an African parasitologist, Professor and Head of the Medical Entomology and Parasitology Department at the Health Sciences Research Institute. His research considers the use of gene drive to eliminate malaria, and he leads Target Malaria Burkina Faso. He delivered the first genetically modified mosquitoes in Africa, marking a historic moment for science. He was awarded the 2023 Falling Walls Science Prize for Science and Innovation Management. In April 2024, he spoke at the TED 2024: The Brave and The Brilliant conference in Vancouver.

== Early life and education ==
Diabaté grew up in a small village in Burkina Faso. As a child he suffered from many episodes of malaria, and almost died when he was four years old. This experience was pivotal in his vocation to take on a scientific career and dedicate it to finding innovative solutions to fight malaria. He obtained a Doctorate of Animal Biology and Ecology degree at the University of Ouagadougou. In particular Professor Diabaté studied insecticide resistance. He earned his PhD in parasitology at the University of Montpellier II. He was a postdoctoral researcher at the Laboratory of Malaria and Vector Research in the National Institutes of Health from 2005. It was the first time he had left Burkina Faso, and he joined a research group studying Anopheles gambiae. After completing his fellowship, he returned to Burkina Faso in 2009 and took up a position at the Research Institute in Health Sciences (Institut de Recherche en Sciences de la Santé) in Bobo-Dioulasso, Burkina Faso.

== Research and career ==
=== Target Malaria ===
His research has focused on population biology and the biology of mosquito males. In 2009 he was particularly interested in methods to interrupt mosquito mating and related approaches to vector-borne disease control. He returned to Burkina Faso in 2009, where he was awarded a Tropical Disease Research (TDR) World Health Organization grant. He partnered with Keele University and started studying swarms of Anopheles gambiae. He was awarded a Medical Research Council and Department for International Development African Research Leader Scheme fellowship, and expanded his research programme on medical entomology.

In 2013 he was awarded the Royal Society Pfizer Award for his work on the biology of Anopheles. He pioneered some of the most advanced work on using genetically modified mosquitoes to tackle malaria, and led the Target Malaria Burkina Faso/IRSS team through the first genetically modified mosquito release in Africa in 2019. It was developed in the UK at Imperial College London, tested in the UK and Italy and imported to the insectary at the Institut de Recherche en Sciences de la Santé (IRSS) in Bobo-Dioulasso, Burkina Faso. He is currently studying it under contained use and hope to conduct an experimental field release in 2025.

=== Fungi ===
Diabaté’s team genetically modified the fungi Metarhizium pingshaense to deliver insecticidal proteins into mosquito blood. This transgenic fungus is engineered to express an insect-specific spider neurotoxin (Ca++/K+ channel blocker).

== Awards and honours ==
- 2013 Royal Society Pfizer Award
- 2020 American Association for the Advancement of Science Newcomb Cleveland Prize
- 2022 Vox Media Future Perfect
- 2022 Government of Burkina Faso Chevalier des Palmes Académiques
- 2023 Falling Walls Science Prize for Science and Innovation Management

== Select publications ==
- Diabaté, Abdoulaye; Thierry Baldet; Chandre, Fabrice; et al. (2002). "The role of agricultural use of insecticides in resistance to pyrethroids in Anopheles gambiae s.l. in Burkina Faso". American Journal of Tropical Medicine and Hygiene. 67 (6): 617–622. PMID 12518852. Wikidata Q39639213.
- Baldini, Francesco; Nicola Segata; Julien Pompon; et al. (2014). "Evidence of natural Wolbachia infections in field populations of Anopheles gambiae". Nature Communications. 5 (1): 3985. Bibcode:2014NatCo...5.3985B. doi:10.1038/ncomms4985. PMC 4059924. PMID 24905191. Wikidata Q33764379.
- Diabaté, Abdoulaye; Adama Dao; Alpha S Yaro; et al. (2009). "Spatial swarm segregation and reproductive isolation between the molecular forms of Anopheles gambiae". Proceedings of the Royal Society B. 276 (1676): 4215–4222. doi:10.1098/rspb.2009.1167. PMC 2821344. PMID 19734189. Wikidata Q51650711.
- Abkallo, H.M., Arbuthnot, P., Auer, T.O. et al. Making genome editing a success story in Africa. Nat Biotechnol (2024). https://doi.org/10.1038/s41587-024-02187-2
- Connolly, J.B., Burt, A., Christophides, G. et al. Considerations for first field trials of low-threshold gene drive for malaria vector control. Malar J 23, 156 (2024). https://doi.org/10.1186/s12936-024-04952-9
