= Kevin M. Esvelt =

American biologist

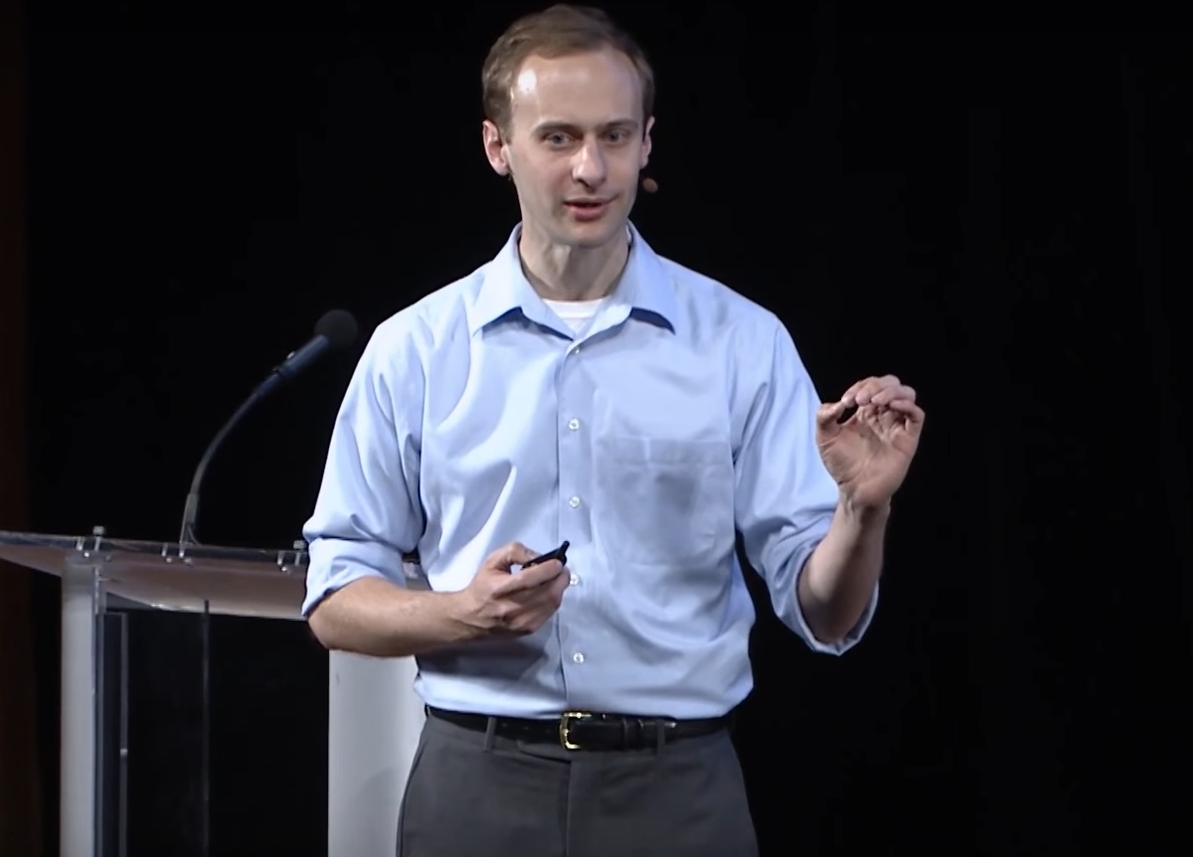
- Kevin Esvelt in 2016
- Occupation: Associate professor at the MIT Media Lab

Academic background
- Education: PhD in Biochemistry, Harvard University, B.A. in Chemistry and Biology, Harvey Mudd College

Academic work
- Discipline: Biology
- Main interests: Gene drives; directed evolution; genome engineering; molecular biology; microbiology; ecological engineering
- Website: https://www.media.mit.edu/people/esvelt/overview/

Kevin Michael Esvelt is an American biologist. He is currently an associate professor at the MIT Media Lab and leads the Sculpting Evolution group. After receiving a B.A. in chemistry and biology from Harvey Mudd College, he completed his PhD work at Harvard University as a Hertz Fellow. Esvelt developed phage assisted continuous evolution (PACE) during his PhD as a graduate student in David R. Liu's laboratory. As a Wyss Technology Fellow, Esvelt was involved with the development of gene drive technology. He focuses on the bioethics and biosafety of gene drives. In 2016, Esvelt was named an Innovator Under 35 by MIT Technology Review.

== Early life and education ==
Esvelt was born to an elementary school teacher and a Bonneville Power Administration employee, and spent his childhood between Portland and Seattle. Fascinated by biology from an early age, Esvelt first developed an interest in dinosaurs. He discovered his passion lay in genetics after a trip to the Galápagos Islands, where he saw what evolution was capable of and wished to achieve similar results using science.

While an undergraduate at Harvey Mudd, he sought to reversibly induce male infertility using the sperm surface protein fertilin beta. During this time, he was also an advocate for directed panspermia as a defense against extinction of all life, an idea he later rejected.

== Career ==
=== PACE ===
While a graduate student in David Liu's laboratory, Esvelt demonstrated phage-assisted continuous evolution (PACE), a method of using bacteriophages to quickly and efficiently engineer proteins, promoters, and other biomolecules. PACE has since been used to engineer proteases, study antibodies in cancer research, and understand the evolutionary dynamics of proteins.

=== CRISPR-Cas9 and gene drives ===
In 2013, Esvelt proposed the idea of using CRISPR in gene drives. Although both methods had been in use independent of each other, Esvelt was the first to connect the two, and with colleagues show that CRISPR could make the implementation of gene drives easier and more efficient.

The scientific - and ethical - implications of this new, more straightforward method of conducting gene drives were recognized almost immediately. One author compared gene drives to the fictional substance ice-nine, which freezes over any water it comes into contact with, propagating indefinitely as long as there is more accessible water to freeze. While CRISPR-based gene drives have the potential to generate ecosystem alterations that benefit humanity (e.g., eliminating malaria by spreading infertility genes among a population of mosquitoes), unforeseen (or perhaps intentional) such modifications could result in irreparable environmental damage that directly or indirectly causes great harm to people and animals alike. Keenly aware of the adverse effects even a well-intentioned and thought-out gene drive could have, Esvelt consults both scientists and the public in the course of his planning.

=== Biosecurity work ===
In the wake of his controversial work on gene drive technology, and the failures of existing public health structures to adequately respond to the COVID-19 pandemic, Esvelt has become more active in biosecurity research. He argues that action must be taken soon, given that many researchers are able to construct or reconstruct deadly viruses in the lab, and there are few robust safeguards protecting humanity against accidental or deliberate release of these bioweapons. He envisions a three-tiered security system: early detection using a Nucleic Acid Observatory, advanced preparation (involving stockpiling broad-spectrum medicines and better PPE), and better coordination between scientists, organizations, and countries. Esvelt is also involved in SecureDNA, a technology to screen all synthetic DNA sequence orders to prevent actors from obtaining dangerous genes (e.g., from a deadly virus).

== Media appearances ==
To raise awareness about biosecurity issues and recruit interested scientists, Esvelt has made a number of appearances on-screen and in podcasts.

Esvelt appears in the Netflix series Unnatural Selection, where he discusses his efforts to conduct gene drives and the response of the local people who would be affected.

He has also discussed biosecurity and presented his biodefense programs at a number of conferences and podcasts.
