= N'Dorola Department =

Coordinates: 11°46′00″N 4°49′12″W

N'Dorola
- Department
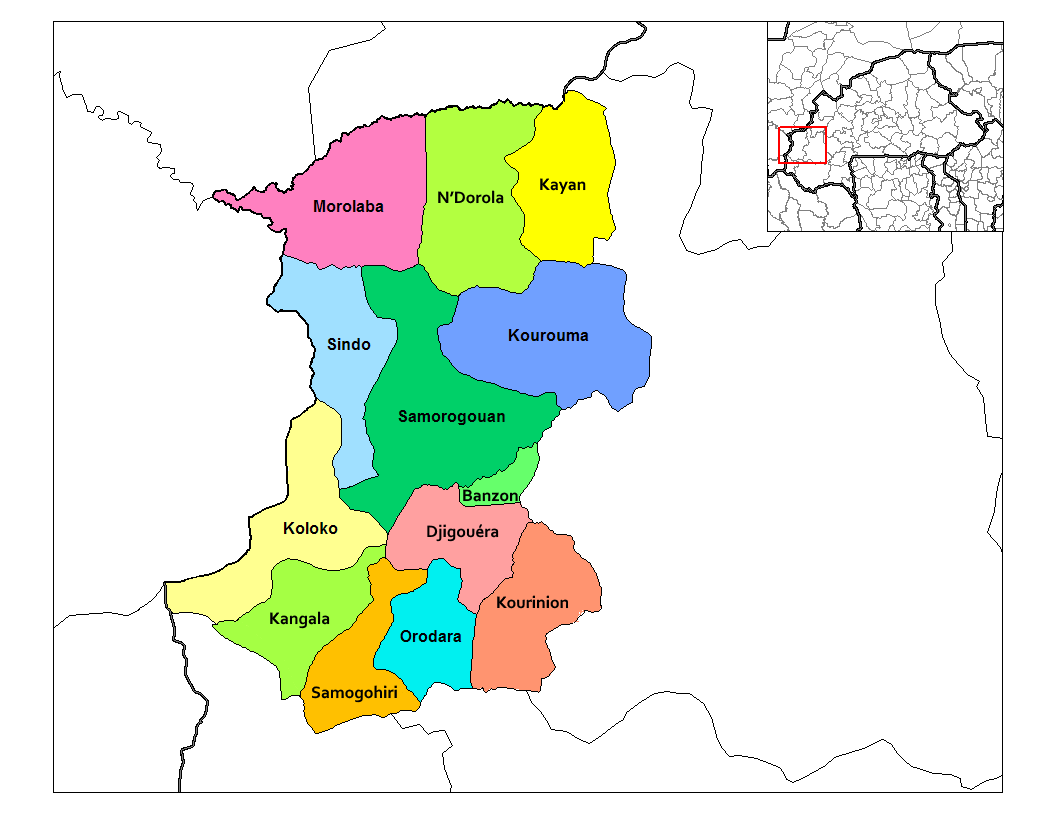
- N'Dorola Department location in the province
- Country: Burkina Faso
- Province: Kénédougou Province
- Time zone: UTC+0 (GMT 0)

N'Dorola is a department or commune of Kénédougou Province in south-western Burkina Faso. Its capital lies at the town of N'Dorola .

== Notable people ==
- Minata Samaté Cessouma
