= Norbert Zongo University =

Public university in Burkina Faso

- Université Norbert Zongo (French)
- Type: Public
- Established: 2005; 21 years ago
- Location: Koudougou, Burkina Faso; 12.240°N 2.399°W
- Campus: Urban

The Norbert Zongo University (French: Université Norbert Zongo; UNZ), formerly the University of Koudougou (French: Université de Koudougou; UK), is one of three public universities in Burkina Faso. It is located in the city of Koudougou. As of 2015/2016 it had the second highest enrollment of students nationally (16.2%) behind the University of Ouagadougou (renamed Université Ouaga 1 Professeur Joseph Ki-Zerbo, UO1-JKZ) which had 32.8% of the national total enrollment. The University Ouaga 2, the Nazi Boni University (UNB) and the Institut des Sciences (IDS) had 13.2%, 11.3%, and 1.9% of total university enrollment, respectively. The remaining 24.5% of enrollment are in private universities. The university was founded in 2005 and in 2015/2016 had 15,346 students.

The university was renamed from University of Koudougou to the current name in 2017 in honour of the investigative journalist Norbert Zongo, assassinated in 1998.

== Faculties ==
The university is divided into five faculties:

- Faculty of Higher Education (Ecole Normale Supérieure; ENS)
- Faculty of Economics and Management (UFR Sciences Economiques et Gestion)
- Faculty of Arts and Letters (UFR Lettres et Sciences Humaines)
- University Institute of Technology (Institut Universitaire de Technologie)
- Faculty of Science and Technics ("UFR Sciences et Techniques")

== 2008-2009 student strike ==
During the 2008–2009 academic year there was a student strike at the university.

== See also ==
- Education in Burkina Faso
