= Animal nutritionist =

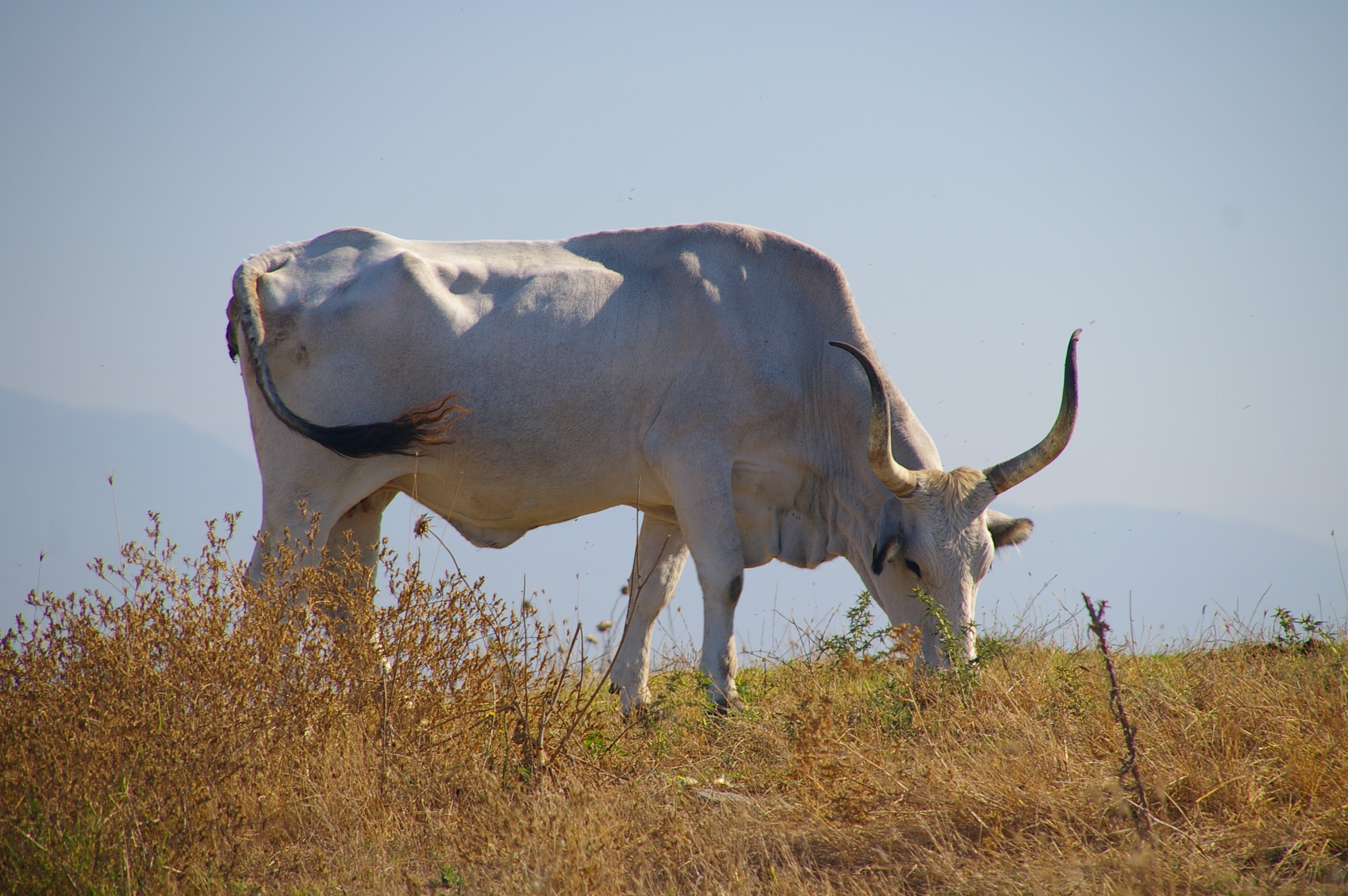
Maremmana cattle, picture taken near Campagnano di Roma.

An animal nutritionist is a person who specializes in animal nutrition, which is especially concerned with the dietary needs of animals in captivity: livestock, pets, and animals in wildlife rehabilitation facilities.

The science of animal nutrition encompasses principles of chemistry (especially biochemistry), physics, mathematics, and ethology (animal behavior). Animal nutrition in the food industry may also be concerned with economics and food processing.

== Education ==
A Bachelor of Science in agricultural, biological or related life sciences is usually required. A typical course would study the metabolism of proteins, carbohydrates, lipids, minerals, vitamins and water, and the relationship between these nutrients and animal production. A Master's degree in nutrition is often seen in animal nutrition and the field requires a Ph.D. in the science of nutrition.

== Career activities ==
Those with an educational background can expect to be employed in the following areas:

- Evaluating the chemical and nutritional value of various animal feeds, feed supplements, grass and forage for livestock, recreational animals such as horses and ponies, pet foods for companion animals, fish, and birds
- Nutritional disorders and the preservation of feeds
- Diet formulation and ration size
- Diets for performance and health
- Diets for reproduction of animals
- Economics of feeding systems
- Dietary regimens
- Animal studies and laboratory trials
- Marketing strategies for new food formulas
- Quality control and performance of feeds
- Investigating nutritional disorders and diet-related diseases

== Notable animal nutritionists ==
- Martin R. Dinnes, Ph.D.
- Chantal Kaboré-Zoungrana, Ph.D. (former head of the national Burkina Faso National Biosafety Agency).
- T. Brailsford Robertson, B.Sc.(hons), Ph.D., D.Sc., inaugural Head of the Australian Council for Scientific and Industrial Research (CSIR)'s Division of Animal Nutrition.
