= Yvonne Bonzi-Coulibaly =

Burkinabe doctor of chemistry

- Citizenship: Burkinabe
- Occupations: Chemistry, Professor
- Awards: Fellow of the National Academy of Sciences, Arts and Letters of Burkina Faso

Yvonne Libona Bonzi-Coulibaly is the first female doctorate in chemistry in Burkina Faso, a full professor at the University of Ouagadougou, a member of the Academy of Sciences of Burkina Faso, the Director-General of the Institute of Sciences of Burkina Faso, and a laureate of the African U

nion Kwame Nkrumah Prize.

== Biography ==
After obtaining a "baccalauréat série D" in 1978, she entered the Université Félix Houphouët-Boigny in Abidjan to study chemistry-biology-geology. Bonzi-Coulibaly earned a doctorate at Strasbourg-I University in organic chemistry from Guy Ourisson.

From 2008 to 2013, she was director of research at the University of Ouagadougou, where she has been a professor-researcher since 2002. She is a member of the Academy of Sciences of Burkina Faso. Since 2018, she has been the Director-General of Burkina Faso's Institute of Sciences which was created in 2004.

In 2020, in partnership with the academic and scientific cooperation of higher education establishments of the Wallonia-Brussels Federation, she began working with Pascal Gerbaux on organic farming and market gardening to replace synthetic inputs with bio-inputs.

== Awards ==
2013: African Union Kwame Nkrumah Prize

== Publications ==
- Removal of COD in wastewaters by activated charcoal from rice husk, Yacouba Sanou, Samuel Pare, Gnon Baba, Nyonuwosro Kwamivi Segbeaya et Libona Yvonne Bonzi-Coulibaly, Revue des sciences de l’eau / Journal of Water Science, Vol. 29, No. 3, pgs. 265–277, 2016, issn: 0992-7158, issn2: 1718-8598, doi: 10.7202/1038927ar.
