= Marie Korsaga =

Burkinabé astrophysicist (born 1984)

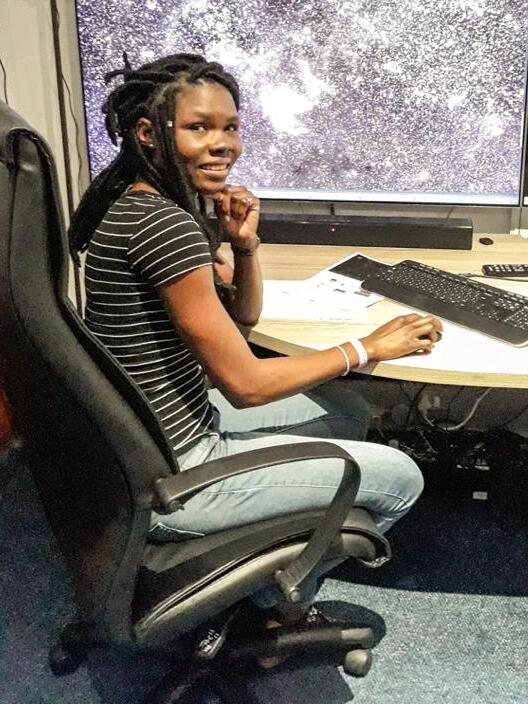
- Korsaga in 2018
- Born: 16 July 1984 (age 41); Méguet, Burkina Faso
- Occupation: Astrophysicist

Academic background
- Education: Joseph Ki-Zerbo University (MSc); Aix-Marseille University (PhD); University of Cape Town

Marie Korsaga (born 16 July 1984) is a Burkinabé astrophysicist working in the field of galactic astronomy and cosmology. She obtained her PhD in astrophysics and cosmology in 2019 after researching the distribution of matter inside nearby galaxies. She is the first female astrophysicist from Burkina Faso. She has worked in outreach aimed at increasing women's participation in science.

== Early life and education ==
Marie Korsaga was born on 16 July 1984 in Méguet, Burkina Faso. She was interested in astronomical phenomena in her childhood. However, due to astronomy's small presence in Burkina Faso, she initially aspired to become a civil engineer. She pursued her undergraduate education at Joseph Ki-Zerbo University. She earned her license in physics in 2009, and completed her maîtrise the following year. She obtained her master's degree in astrophysics in 2012, where she photometrically studied brown dwarfs in visible light. After her master's work, she interned at Aix-Marseille University's Laboratoire d'Astrophysique de Marseille (LAM) to study galaxy kinematics. She pursued her PhD education at Aix-Marseille University jointly with the University of Cape Town. Her PhD research investigated the distribution of baryonic matter and dark matter (Note: Baryonic matter makes up most ordinary matter, while dark matter is an unidentified type of exotic matter inferred from astronomical observations.) inside nearby galaxies. She completed her PhD in astrophysics and cosmology in 2019. She is the first woman from Burkina Faso and West Africa to hold a PhD in astrophysics.

== Career ==
She became a fellow at the International Astronomical Union's (IAU) Office of Astronomy for Development (OAD) in 2020. During her OAD fellowship, she was appointed to research the astronomical community's response to the COVID-19 pandemic. She worked as a postdoctoral researcher at the Instituto de Astrofísica de Andalucía that year. By 2023, she was a postdoctoral researcher at the Observatory of Strasbourg. By 2024, she became a fellow at the University of Oxford's astrophysics department as part of the Africa Oxford Initiative, with astrophysicist Martin Bureau as her mentor. She is an assistant professor at Joseph Ki-Zerbo University's Department of Physics.

Korsaga is a founding member and editor of the astronomy magazine L'Astronomie Afrique. She is a junior member of the IAU.

=== Outreach ===
Korsaga has worked in projects aimed at increasing women's participation in science, technology, engineering, and mathematics (STEM). Traditional attitudes in Burkina Faso view science as a field for men, and she has said that she aims to work towards greater gender equality in Burkinabé sciences. She has stated that she wishes to expand and build educational institutions such as planetariums and a research observatory in Burkina Faso.

=== Awards ===
In 2022, Korsaga received the inaugural early career award from the African Network of Women in Astronomy—a committee of the African Astronomical Society—and €1,500 (F.CFA980,000). She spoke before the African Union and was honoured by the city of Huesca, Spain, in a sundial installed at the Planetarium of Aragon.

== Publications ==
Some of Korsaga's articles include:

- with Amram, P; Carignan, C; Epinat, B (January 2019). "GHASP: an H α kinematics survey of spiral galaxies – XII. Distribution of luminous and dark matter in spiral and irregular nearby galaxies using Rc-band photometry". Monthly Notices of the Royal Astronomical Society. 482 (1): 154–174.
- with Sorgho, A; Carignan, C; Pisano, D J; et al. (January 2019). "Early observations of the MHONGOOSE galaxies: getting ready for MeerKAT". Monthly Notices of the Royal Astronomical Society. 482 (1): 1248–1269.
- with Epinat, B; Amram, P; Carignan, C; et al. (December 2019). "GHASP: an H α kinematical survey of spiral galaxies – XIII. Distribution of luminous and dark matter in spiral and irregular nearby galaxies using H α and H i rotation curves and WISE photometry". Monthly Notices of the Royal Astronomical Society. 490 (3): 2977–30241.
- with Namumba, B; Román, J; Falcón-Barroso, J; et al. (March 2023). "MIGHTEE-H i : possible interactions with the galaxy NGC 895". Monthly Notices of the Royal Astronomical Society. 521 (4): 5177–5190.
- with Famaey, Benoit; Freundlich, Jonathan; Posti, Lorenzo; et al. (August 2023). "Disk Galaxies Are Self-similar: The Universality of the H i-to-Halo Mass Ratio for Isolated Disks". The Astrophysical Journal Letters. 952 (2).
