= Jon Mosar =

Swiss geologist and academic

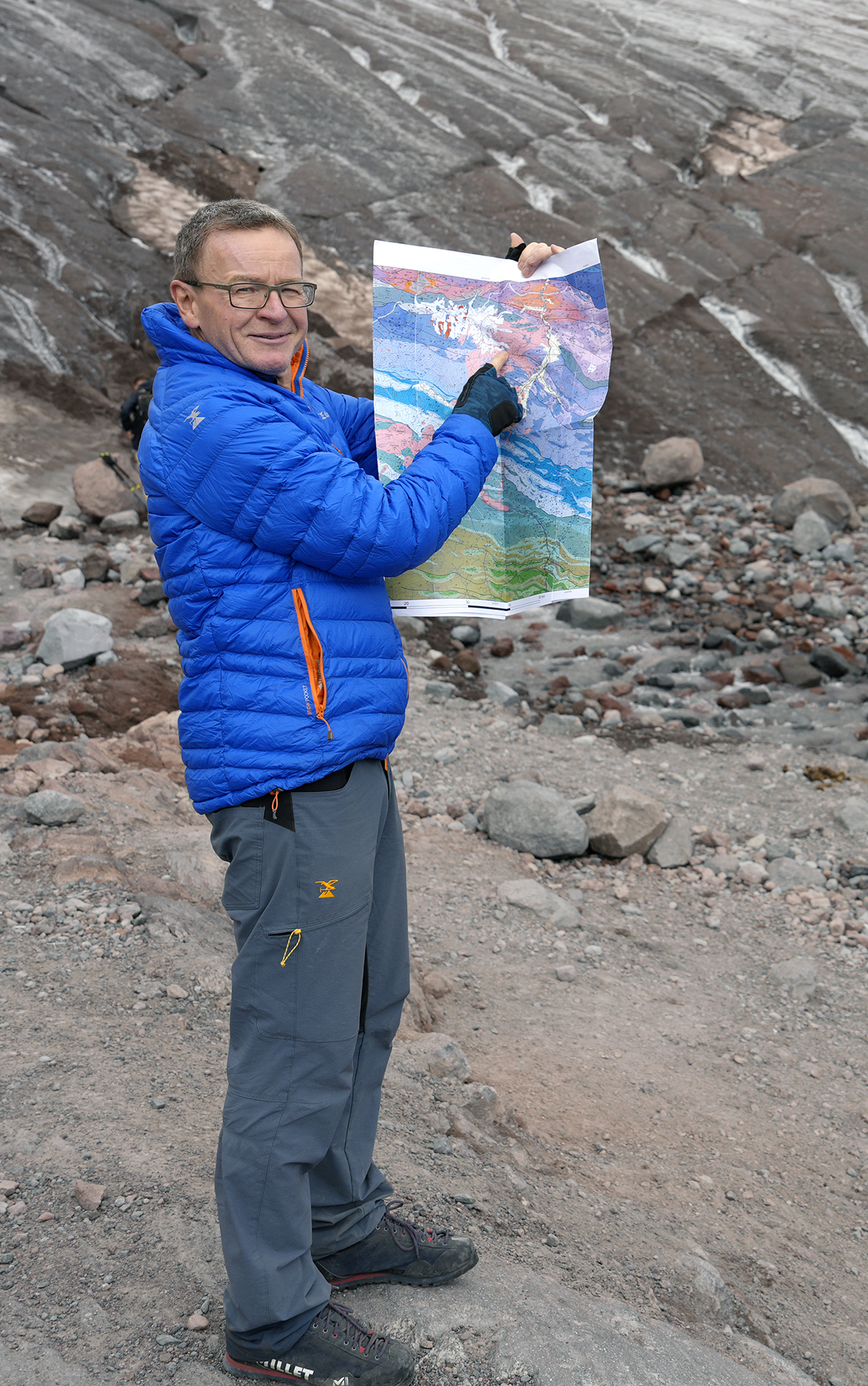
- Occupations: Geologist and academic

Academic background
- Education: CES; MSc; DEA; DSc
- Alma mater: Louis Pasteur University; University of Neuchâtel

Jon Mosar is a geologist and academic serving as a Professor of Tectonics and Geodynamics in the Department of Geosciences at the University of Fribourg, Switzerland. His work spans tectonics, structural geology and plate tectonics, emphasizing geological processes of faulting, orogenic wedge mechanics, and fault-related folding. It is based on exploration geophysics, analog and numerical modeling, and mapping of Earth's geological structures.

== Early life and education ==
Mosar earned a Certificat général d'éducation in sciences and languages, focusing on natural sciences, from the Lycée de Garçons de Luxembourg in 1978, followed by a Certificat d'études scientifiques (C.E.S.) in chemistry, biology, and geology from the Centre Universitaire in Luxembourg in 1979. He subsequently moved to France, where he studied at Louis Pasteur University, receiving a Maîtrise en Sciences de la Terre in 1982 and a Diplôme d'études approfondies (D.E.A.) in geology in 1983. He completed a Doctorat ès sciences in structural geology in 1987. He then conducted postdoctoral research in structural geology at Princeton University, USA, from 1988 to 1990, and at the University of Lausanne, Switzerland, from 1990 to 1993, with grants from the FNRS, the Luxembourg Government, NATO, and Fulbright-Hayes fellowships.

== Career ==
Mosar began his academic career as a post-doctoral researcher at Princeton University, where he worked with John Suppe from 1988 to 1990. Following postdoctoral research at the Musée de Géologie of the Canton of Vaud (Switzerland), he was appointed First Assistant, equivalent to Assistant Professor, at the University of Lausanne from 1993 to 1998, while also serving as a Professor at the Université Populaire de Lausanne (UPL) from 1997 to 1998. Between 1998 and 2002, he worked at the Geological Survey of Norway (NGU) in Trondheim, initially as Senior Researcher and Associate Professor, later becoming Full Professor. In 2003, he received his Venia Legendi and Habilitation from the Department of Geosciences at the University of Fribourg, where he held the position of Maître d'Enseignement et de Recherche (MER) from 2002 to 2011. He has been a Professor in the Department of Geosciences since 2011.

Mosar was a member of the Scientific Council of the European Center for Geodynamics and Seismology (ECGS) from 2002 to 2011, serving as its President from 2008 to 2011. From 2009 to 2023, he served on the Geological Commission of the Swiss Academy of Sciences, as Vice President from 2017 to 2023, and has been its President since 2024.

Mosar has been featured in media outlets, such as World Radio Switzerland, Radio Luxembourg, Radio Suisse Romande, Télévision Suisse Romande, Radio Télévision Suisse, Migros Magazine, Le Matin and La Liberté. In 2003, he was portrayed in a book on 100 Luxembourgers Around The World.

== Research ==
Mosar's research has primarily focused on the evolution of mountain belts, foreland basins, and passive continental margins. He has worked on Alpine tectonics, including the Jura Mountains and the Swiss Molasse Basin, as well as the Greater Caucasus region. His studies have demonstrated that the Greater Caucasus is a doubly vergent orogenic belt thrusting both to the north and the south that resulted from the inversion of a rifted intracontinental basin. Alongside collaborators, he investigated the 4-D topographic evolution of Europe's orogens and intra-plate regions through a multidisciplinary approach, aiming to integrate research on neotectonics, vertical motion rates, and natural hazards across diverse European regions. His work contributed to provide insights into subduction, obduction, and collision processes in the Lesser Caucasus, identifying two subductions, the obduction of ophiolites, and subsequent collisions involving the South Armenian Block and the Eurasian plate, shaping the region's geological evolution from the Late Cretaceous to the Miocene.

Mosar presented a structural model for the Scandinavian North Atlantic passive margin, highlighting the asymmetric crustal extension between Greenland and Norway, and the changing geometry of major normal faults during rifting from the Permo-Carboniferous to the present. In a study that was named the Best Scientific Paper of the Geological Survey of Norway, he reconstructed the Cretaceous–Early Tertiary North Atlantic using palaeomagnetic, hotspot, and magnetic anomaly data, identifying significant true polar wander between 125 and 95 Ma due to mantle instabilities. Testing Late Carboniferous–Early Tertiary apparent polar wander paths for North America and Europe, he introduced a new Greenland fit between Europe and North America to better align with geological data and minimize discrepancies in North Atlantic reconstructions. Furthermore, he investigated the Tertiary development of the Norwegian continental margin, highlighting the impact of spreading rates, the Iceland hotspot, and structural differences on inversion features in the Vøring and Faeroes Basins.

In the European Alps, Mosar studied the detached klippen belt of the Préalpes, an area that escaped the intense deformation of other zones of the Briançonnais domain, in Switzerland and France, to propose a new tectonic model based on a detailed structural analyses. Reviewing the significance of the Briançonnais microcontinental domain in the frame of the Alpine collision, he contributed to reveal subduction–obduction processes in the Adria-Europe plate tectonic convergence, with the Briançonnais incorporated into the accretionary prism by the Middle Eocene after a long history of oceanic subduction. To clarify the geological evolution of the western Alps and its surrounding regions, he presented a detailed transect of the western Swiss Alps and compared it with plate tectonic models of the western Tethys. Using analogue modeling to explore the impact of surface processes on the orogenic evolution of the northwestern Alpine orogenic wedge, he illuminated the role of erosion, sedimentation, and wedge mechanics in the development of the foreland basin and thrust belt.

Mosar's research has concentrated on exploring the tectonics and structural evolution of the detached Alpine foreland fold-and-thrust belt. In collaboration with his research team, he conducted studies that have investigated the kinematic development and deep structure of the Swiss and French Molasse Basin as well as the Jura Mountains. He has emphasized the interplay between tectonic processes within the mechanical wedge of the detached foreland and crustal- or lithospheric-scale processes linked to the rifting and flexuring of the underlying basement. Together with his research team, he has illustrated and highlighted the role of inherited faults and associated paleotopography. Additionally, the paleostress and present-day stress fields in the Alpine foreland fold-and-thrust belt have been central to his studies.

== Selected articles ==
- Stampfli, G. M., Mosar, J., Marquer, D., Marchant, R., Baudin, T., & Borel, G. (1998). Subduction and obduction processes in the Swiss Alps. Tectonophysics, 296(1-2), 159-204. https://doi.org/10.1016/S0040-1951(98)00142-5
- Mosar, J., Eide, E. A., Osmundsen, P. T., Sommaruga, A., & Torsvik, T. H. (2002). Greenland–Norway separation: a geodynamic model for the North Atlantic. Norwegian Journal of Geology, 82, 282-299.
- Torsvik, T. H., Van der Voo, R., Meert, J. G., Mosar, J., & Walderhaug, H. J. (2001). Reconstructions of the continents around the North Atlantic at about the 60th parallel. Earth and Planetary Science Letters, 187(1-2), 55-69. http://dx.doi.org/10.1016/S0012-821X(01)00284-9
- Stampfli, G. M., Borel, G. D., Marchant, R., & Mosar, J. (2002). Western Alps geological constraints on western Tethyan reconstructions. Journal of the Virtual Explorer, 8, 77-106. https://doi.org/10.3809/jvirtex.2002.00057
- Mosar, J. (2003). Scandinavia's North Atlantic passive margin. Journal of Geophysical Research: Solid Earth, 108(B8). https://doi.org/10.1029/2002JB002134
- Bonnet, C., Malavieille, J., & Mosar, J. (2007). Interactions between tectonics, erosion, and sedimentation during the recent evolution of the Alpine orogen: Analogue modeling insights. Tectonics, 26(6). https://doi.org/10.1029/2006TC002048
- Sosson, M., Rolland, Y., Müller, C., Danelian, T., Melkonyan, R., Kekelia, S., ... & Mosar, J. (2010). Subductions, obduction and collision in the Lesser Caucasus (Armenia, Azerbaijan, Georgia), new insights. Geological Society, London, Special Publications, 340(1), 329-352. https://doi.org/10.1144/SP340.14
- Mosar, J., Kangarli, T., Bochud, M., Glasmacher, U. A., Rast, A., Brunet, M. F., & Sosson, M. (2010). Cenozoic-Recent tectonics and uplift in the Greater Caucasus: a perspective from Azerbaijan. Geological Society, London, Special Publications, 340(1), 261-280. https://doi.org/10.1144/SP340.12
- Radaideh, O. M., & Mosar, J. (2021). Cenozoic Tectonic Deformation Along the Pontarlier Strike‐Slip Fault Zone (Swiss and French Jura Fold‐and‐Thrust Belt): Insights From Paleostress and Geomorphic Analyses. Tectonics, 40(5), e2021TC006758. https://doi.org/10.1029/2021TC006758
- Mosar, J., Mauvilly, J., Koiava, K., Gamkrelidze, I., Enna, N., Lavrishev, V., & Kalberguenova, V. (2022). Tectonics in the Greater Caucasus (Georgia–Russia): From an intracontinental rifted basin to a doubly verging fold-and-thrust belt. Marine and Petroleum Geology, 140, 105630. https://doi.org/10.1016/j.marpetgeo.2022.105630
