= Louis Pasteur University =

University in France

Louis Pasteur University Strasbourg I
- Université Louis-Pasteur Strasbourg I
- Established: 1567
- President: Alain Beretz
- Students: 18,847
- Location: Strasbourg, Alsace, France; 48.5816°N 7.7648°E
- Website: Official university website

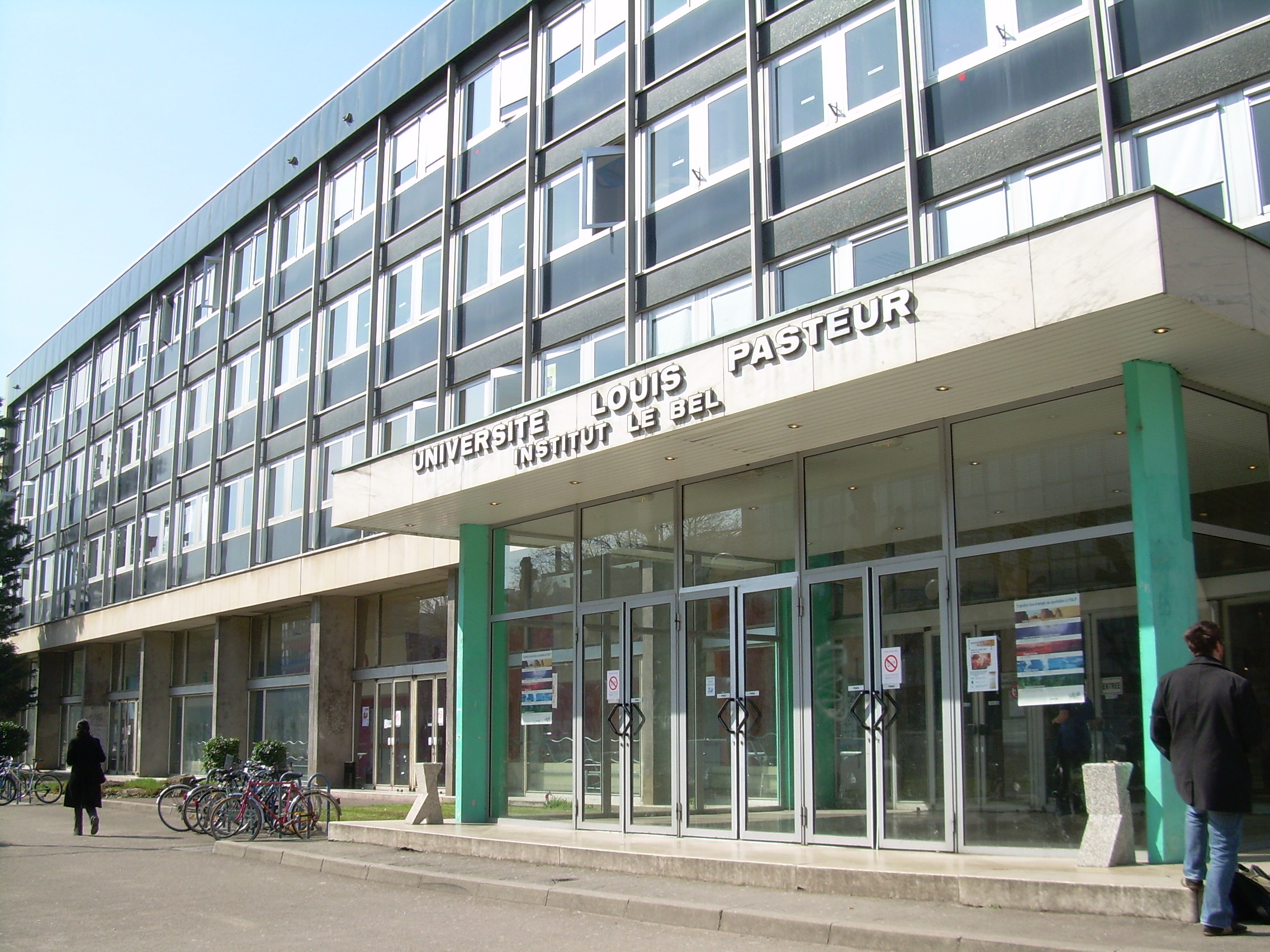
Physics is taught at the Le Bel Institute

Louis Pasteur University (French: Université Louis-Pasteur, abbr. ULP), also known as Strasbourg I, was a large university in Strasbourg, Alsace, France. As of 15 January 2007, there were 18,847 students enrolled at the university, including around 3,000 foreign students. Research and teaching at ULP concentrated on the natural sciences, technology and medicine. On 1 January 2009, Louis Pasteur University became part of the refounded University of Strasbourg and lost its status as an independent university.

The university was a member of the LERU (League of European Research Universities). It was named after the famous 19th-century French scientist Louis Pasteur. Nineteen Nobel laureates and two laureates of the Fields Medal have studied, taught or conducted research at Louis Pasteur University, underlining the excellent reputation of the university.

== Notable staff and students ==
- Louis Pasteur (1822–1895), professor of chemistry
- Adolf von Baeyer (1835–1917), professor of chemistry, Nobel Prize in Chemistry in 1905
- Charles Louis Alphonse Laveran (1845–1922), medical student, Nobel Prize in Physiology or Medicine in 1907
- Wilhelm Röntgen (1845–1923), lecturer in physics, Nobel Prize in Physics in 1901
- Karl Ferdinand Braun (1850–1918), professor of physics, Nobel Prize in Physics in 1909
- Hermann Emil Fischer (1851–1919), graduate student in chemistry, Nobel Prize in Chemistry in 1902
- Albrecht Kossel (1853–1927), physician and biochemist, Nobel Prize in Physiology or Medicine in 1910
- Paul Ehrlich (1854–1915), medical student, Nobel Prize in Physiology or Medicine in 1908
- Pieter Zeeman (1865–1943), postdoctoral fellow, Nobel Prize in Physics in 1902
- Otto Loewi (1873–1961), medical student, Nobel Prize in Physiology or Medicine in 1936
- Albert Schweitzer (1875–1965), theologian, musician, philosopher, and physician, Nobel Peace Prize in 1952
- Max von Laue (1879–1960), undergraduate student in mathematics and physics, Nobel Prize in Physics in 1914
- Hermann Staudinger (1881–1965), professor of chemistry, Nobel Prize in Chemistry in 1953
- Otto Fritz Meyerhof (1884–1951), medical student, Nobel Prize in Physiology or Medicine in 1922
- Alfred Kastler (1902–1984), graduate student in physics, Nobel Prize in Physics in 1966
- Louis Néel (1904–2000), graduate student in physics, Nobel Prize in Physics in 1970
- Laurent Schwartz (1915–2002), graduate student in mathematics, Fields Medal in 1950
- René Thom (1923–2002), professor of mathematics, Fields Medal in 1958
- Martin Karplus (1930–2024), professor of chemistry, Nobel Prize in Chemistry in 2013
- Pierre Chambon (1931–), professor of biology, Lasker Award in 2004, Canada Gairdner International Award in 2010
- Jean-Marie Lehn (1939–), professor of chemistry, Nobel Prize in Chemistry in 1987
- Yves Meyer (1939–), graduate student in mathematics, Abel Prize in 2017
- Jon Mosar, professor of Tectonics and Geodynamics at University of Fribourg, Switzerland
- Jules Hoffmann (1941–), professor of biology, Nobel Prize in Physiology or Medicine in 2011
- Marie-Denise Fabien Jean-Louis (1944–), medical student, Haitian Minister of Foreign Affairs in 1991
- Jean-Pierre Sauvage (1944–), professor of chemistry, Nobel Prize in Chemistry in 2016
- Yvonne Libona Bonzi Coulibaly (1960–), graduate student in chemistry, African Union Kwame Nkrumah Prize in 2013
- Pascal Mayer (1963–), undergraduate and graduate student in biophysics, Breakthrough Prize in Life Sciences in 2022, Canada Gairdner International Award in 2024
- Mounir Majidi (1965–), Moroccan businessman
- Philippe Horvath (1970–), undergraduate and graduate student in biology, Canada Gairdner International Award in 2016

== Points of interest ==
- Jardin botanique de l'Université de Strasbourg
- Musée zoologique de l'ULP et de la ville de Strasbourg

== See also ==
- University of Strasbourg
- École européenne de chimie, polymères et matériaux, the European school of chemistry
