= Gene drive =

Way to propagate genes throughout a population

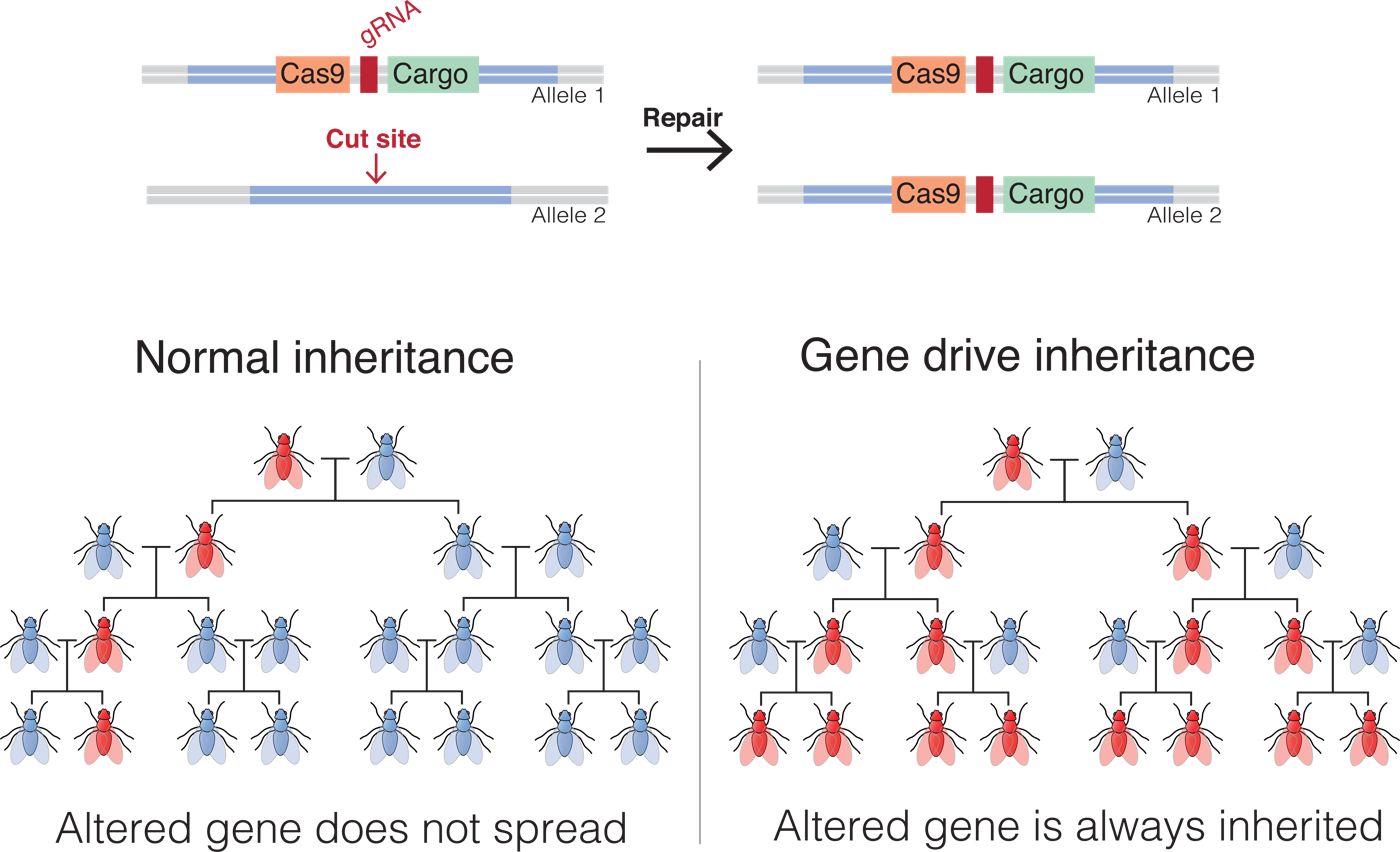
Artificial gene drive using a CRISPR-Cas9 system: gRNA instructs Cas9 to cut at the rival allele, causing the repair mechanism to replace the damage with the Cas9-containing allele

A gene drive is a natural process (see meiotic drive) and technology of genetic engineering that propagates a particular suite of genes throughout a population by altering the probability that a specific allele will be transmitted to offspring (instead of the Mendelian 50% probability). Gene drives can arise through a variety of mechanisms. They have been proposed to provide an effective means of genetically modifying specific populations and entire species.

The technique can employ adding, deleting, disrupting, or modifying genes.

Proposed applications include exterminating insects that carry pathogens (notably mosquitoes that transmit malaria, dengue, and zika pathogens), controlling invasive species, or eliminating herbicide or pesticide resistance.

As with any potentially powerful technique, gene drives can be misused in a variety of ways or induce unintended consequences. For example, a gene drive intended to affect only a local population might spread across an entire species. Gene drives that eradicate populations of invasive species in their non-native habitats may have consequences for the population of the species as a whole, even in its native habitat. Any accidental return of individuals of the species to its original habitats, through natural migration, environmental disruption (storms, floods, etc.), accidental human transportation, or purposeful relocation, could unintentionally drive the species to extinction if the relocated individuals carried harmful gene drives.

Gene drives can be built from many naturally occurring selfish genetic elements that use a variety of molecular mechanisms. These naturally occurring mechanisms induce similar segregation distortion in the wild, arising when alleles evolve molecular mechanisms that give them a transmission chance greater than the normal 50%.

Most gene drives have been developed in insects, notably mosquitoes, as a way to control insect-borne pathogens. Recent developments designed gene drives directly in viruses, notably herpesviruses. These viral gene drives can propagate a modification into the population of viruses, and aim to reduce the infectivity of the virus.

== Mechanism ==
In sexually-reproducing species, most genes are present in two copies (which can be the same or different alleles), either one of which has a 50% chance of passing to a descendant. By biasing the inheritance of particular altered genes, synthetic gene drives could more effectively spread alterations through a population.

Typically, scientists insert the gene drive into an organism's DNA along with the CRISPR-Cas9 machinery. When the modified organism mates and its DNA mixes with that of its mate, the CRISPR-Cas9 tool cuts the partner's DNA at the same spot where the gene drive is located in the first organism. The cell repairs the cut DNA by copying the gene drive from the first organism into the corresponding spot in the DNA of the offspring. This means both copies of the gene (one from each parent) now contain the gene drive. This in turn means all offspring of that individual will inherit the gene drive.

=== Molecular mechanisms ===
Molecular mechanism of a gene drive based on Cas9 and guide RNA.

At the molecular level, an endonuclease gene drive works by cutting a chromosome at a specific site that does not encode the drive, inducing the cell to repair the damage by copying the drive sequence onto the damaged chromosome. The cell then has two copies of the drive sequence. The method derives from genome editing techniques and relies on homologous recombination. To achieve this behavior, endonuclease gene drives consist of two nested elements:

- An endonuclease that selectively cuts at the "target sequence", i.e. the rival allele. This can be one of:
  - A homing endonuclease, which is what natural inteins use to propagate. They are, however, very difficult, if not impossible, to retarget.
  - An RNA-guided endonuclease (e.g., Cas9 or Cas12a) and its guide RNA, which can be easily altered to set the target. Cas9 is the most promising technology identified in a 2014 review. Cas9 gene drives have been successfully tested in 2015, and Cas12a in 2023.
  - Any other programmable endonuclease system, such as modular zinc finger nucleases and TALEN. One such drive has been successfully tested in fruit flies, but it turned out to be evolutionarily unstable due to the many-repeat nature of those endonucleases.
- A template sequence used by the DNA repair machinery after the target sequence is cut. To achieve the self-propagating nature of gene drives, this repair template contains at least the endonuclease sequence. Because the template must be used to repair a double-strand break at the cutting site, its sides are homologous to the sequences that are adjacent to the cutting site in the host genome. By targeting the gene drive to a gene coding sequence, this gene will be inactivated; additional sequences can be introduced in the gene drive to encode new functions.

As a result, the gene drive insertion in the genome will re-occur in each organism that inherits one copy of the modification and one copy of the wild-type gene. If the gene drive is already present in the egg cell (e.g. when received from one parent), all the gametes of the individual will carry the gene drive (instead of 50% in the case of a normal gene).

=== Spreading in the population ===
Since it can never more than double in frequency with each generation, a gene drive introduced in a single individual typically requires dozens of generations to affect a substantial fraction of a population. Alternatively, releasing drive-containing organisms in sufficient numbers can affect the rest within a few generations; for instance, by introducing it in every thousandth individual, it takes only 12–15 generations to be present in all individuals. Whether a gene drive will ultimately become fixed in a population and at which speed depends on its effect on individual fitness, on the rate of allele conversion, and on the population structure. In a well mixed population and with realistic allele conversion frequencies (≈90%), population genetics predicts that gene drives get fixed for a selection coefficient smaller than 0.3; in other words, gene drives can be used to spread modifications as long as reproductive success is not reduced by more than 30%. This is in contrast with normal genes, which can only spread across large populations if they increase fitness.

=== Gene drive in viruses ===
Because the strategy usually relies on the simultaneous presence of an unmodified and a gene drive allele in the same cell nucleus, it had generally been assumed that a gene drive could only be engineered in sexually reproducing organisms, excluding bacteria and viruses. However, during a viral infection, viruses can accumulate hundreds or thousands of genome copies in infected cells. Cells are frequently co-infected by multiple virions and recombination between viral genomes is a well-known and widespread source of diversity for many viruses. In particular, herpesviruses are nuclear-replicating DNA viruses with large double-stranded DNA genomes and frequently undergo homologous recombination during their replication cycle.

These properties have enabled the design of a gene drive strategy that doesn't involve sexual reproduction, instead relying on co-infection of a given cell by a naturally occurring and an engineered virus. Upon co-infection, the unmodified genome is cut and repaired by homologous recombination, producing new gene drive viruses that can progressively replace the naturally occurring population. In cell culture experiments, it was shown that a viral gene drive can spread into the viral population and strongly reduce the infectivity of the virus, which opens novel therapeutic strategies against herpesviruses.

== Technical limitations ==
Because gene drives propagate by replacing other alleles that contain a cutting site and the corresponding homologies, their application has been mostly limited to sexually reproducing species (because they are diploid or polyploid and alleles are mixed at each generation). As a side effect, inbreeding could in principle be an escape mechanism, but the extent to which this can happen in practice is difficult to evaluate.

Due to the number of generations required for a gene drive to affect an entire population, the time to universality varies according to the reproductive cycle of each species: it may require under a year for some invertebrates, but centuries for organisms with years-long intervals between birth and sexual maturity, such as humans. Hence this technology is of most use in fast-reproducing species.

Effectiveness in real practice varies between techniques, especially by choice of germline promoter. Lin and Potter 2016 (a) discloses the promoter technology homology assisted CRISPR knockin (HACK) and Lin and Potter 2016 (b) demonstrates actual use, achieving a high proportion of altered progeny from each altered Drosophila mother.

== Issues ==
Issues highlighted by researchers include:

- Mutations: A mutation could happen mid-drive, which has the potential to allow unwanted traits to "ride along".
- Escape: Cross-breeding or gene flow potentially allow a drive to move beyond its target population.
- Ecological impacts: Even when new traits' direct impact on a target is understood, the drive may have side effects on the surroundings.

The Broad Institute of MIT and Harvard added gene drives to a list of uses of gene-editing technology it doesn't think companies should pursue.

=== Bioethics concerns ===
Gene drives affect all future generations and represent the possibility of a larger change in a living species than has been possible before.

In December 2015, scientists of major world academies called for a moratorium on inheritable human genome edits that would affect the germline, including those related to CRISPR-Cas9 technologies, but supported continued basic research and gene editing that would not affect future generations. In February 2016, British scientists were given permission by regulators to genetically modify human embryos by using CRISPR-Cas9 and related techniques on condition that the embryos were destroyed in seven days. In June 2016, the US National Academies of Sciences, Engineering, and Medicine released a report on their "Recommendations for Responsible Conduct" of gene drives.

A 2018 mathematical modelling studies suggest that despite preexisting and evolving gene drive resistance (caused by mutations at the cutting site), even an inefficient CRISPR "alteration-type" gene drive can achieve fixation in small populations. With a small but non-zero amount of gene flow among many local populations, the gene drive can escape and convert outside populations as well.

Kevin M. Esvelt stated that an open conversation was needed around the safety of gene drives: "In our view, it is wise to assume that invasive and self-propagating gene drive systems are likely to spread to every population of the target species throughout the world. Accordingly, they should only be built to combat true plagues such as malaria, for which we have few adequate countermeasures and that offer a realistic path towards an international agreement to deploy among all affected nations.". He moved to an open model for his own research on using gene drives to eradicate Lyme disease in Nantucket and Martha's Vineyard. Esvelt and colleagues suggested that CRISPR could be used to save endangered wildlife from extinction. Esvelt later retracted his support for the idea, except for extremely hazardous populations such as malaria-carrying mosquitoes, and isolated islands that would prevent the drive from spreading beyond the target area.

== History ==
Austin Burt, an evolutionary geneticist at Imperial College London, introduced the possibility of conducting gene drives based on natural homing endonuclease selfish genetic elements in 2003.

Researchers had already shown that such genes could act selfishly to spread rapidly over successive generations. Burt suggested that gene drives might be used to prevent a mosquito population from transmitting the malaria parasite or to crash a mosquito population. Gene drives based on homing endonucleases have been demonstrated in the laboratory in transgenic populations of mosquitoes and fruit flies. However, homing endonucleases are sequence-specific. Altering their specificity to target other sequences of interest remains a major challenge. The possible applications of gene drive remained limited until the discovery of CRISPR and associated RNA-guided endonucleases such as Cas9 and Cas12a.

In June 2014, the World Health Organization (WHO) Special Programme for Research and Training in Tropical Diseases issued guidelines for evaluating genetically modified mosquitoes. In 2013 the European Food Safety Authority issued a protocol for environmental assessments of all genetically modified organisms.

=== Funding ===
Target Malaria, a project funded by the Bill and Melinda Gates Foundation, invested $75 million in gene drive technology. The foundation originally estimated the technology to be ready for field use by 2029 somewhere in Africa. However, in 2016 Gates changed this estimate to some time within the following two years. In December 2017, documents released under the Freedom of Information Act showed that DARPA had invested $100 million in gene drive research.

== Control strategies ==
Scientists have designed multiple strategies to maintain control over gene drives.

In 2020, researchers reported the development of two active guide RNA-only elements that, according to their study, may enable halting or deleting gene drives introduced into populations in the wild with CRISPR-Cas9 gene editing. The paper's senior author cautions that the two neutralizing systems they demonstrated in cage trials "should not be used with a false sense of security for field-implemented gene drives".

If elimination is not necessary, it may be desirable to intentionally preserve the target population at a lower level by using a less severe gene drive technology. This works by maintaining the semi-defective population indefinitely in the target area, thereby crowding out potential nearby, wild populations that would otherwise move back in to fill a void.

== CRISPR ==
CRISPR is the leading genetic engineering method. In 2014, Esvelt and coworkers first suggested that CRISPR/Cas9 might be used to build gene drives. In 2015, researchers reported successful engineering of CRISPR-based gene drives in Saccharomyces, Drosophila, and mosquitoes. They reported efficient inheritance distortion over successive generations, with one study demonstrating the spread of a gene into laboratory populations. Drive-resistant alleles were expected to arise for each of the described gene drives; however, this could be delayed or prevented by targeting highly conserved sites at which resistance was expected to have a severe fitness cost.

Because of CRISPR's targeting flexibility, gene drives could theoretically be used to engineer almost any trait. Unlike previous approaches, they could be tailored to block the evolution of drive resistance by targeting multiple sequences. CRISPR could also enable gene drive architectures that control rather than eliminate populations.

In 2022, t-CRISPR, was used to pass the "t haplotype" gene to about 95% of offspring. The approach spreads faulty copies of a female fertility gene to offspring, rendering them infertile. The researchers reported that their models suggested that adding 256 altered animals to an island with a population of 200,000 mice would eliminate the population in about 25 years. The traditional approaches of poison and traps were not needed.

== Applications ==
Gene drives have two main classes of application, which have implications of different significance:

- introduce a genetic modification in laboratory populations; once a strain or a line carrying the gene drive has been produced, the drive can be passed to any other line by mating. Here, the gene drive is used to much more easily achieve a task that could be accomplished with other techniques.
- introduce a genetic modification in wild populations. Gene drives constitute a major development that makes possible previously unattainable changes.

Because of their unprecedented potential risk, safeguard mechanisms have been proposed and tested.

=== Disease vector species ===
One possible application is to genetically modify mosquitoes, mice, and other disease vectors so that they cannot transmit diseases, such as malaria and dengue fever in the case of mosquitoes, and tick-borne disease in the case of mice. Researchers have claimed that by applying the technique to 1% of the wild population of mosquitoes, that they could eradicate malaria within a year.

=== Invasive species control ===
A gene drive could be used to eliminate invasive species and has, for example, been proposed as a way to eliminate invasive species in New Zealand. Gene drives for biodiversity conservation purposes are being explored as part of The Genetic Biocontrol of Invasive Rodents (GBIRd) program because they offer the potential for reduced risk to non-target species and reduced costs when compared to traditional invasive species removal techniques. Given the risks of such an approach described below, the GBIRd partnership is committed to a deliberate, step-wise process that will only proceed with public alignment, as recommended by the world's leading gene drive researchers from the Australian and US National Academy of Sciences and many others. A wider outreach network for gene drive research exists to raise awareness of the value of gene drive research for the public good.

Some scientists are concerned about the technique, fearing it could spread and wipe out species in native habitats. The gene could mutate, potentially causing unforeseen problems (as could any gene). Many non-native species can hybridize with native species, such that a gene drive afflicting a non-native plant or animal that hybridizes with a native species could doom the native species. Many non-native species have naturalized into their new environment so well that crops and/or native species have adapted to depend on them.

==== Predator Free 2050 ====
The Predator Free 2050 project is a New Zealand government program to eliminate eight invasive mammalian predator species (including rats, short-tailed weasels (stoats, Mustela erminea), and possums) from the country by 2050. The project was first announced in 2016 by New Zealand's prime minister John Key and in January 2017 it was announced that gene drives would be considered in the effort, but this has not yet been actualised. In 2017, one group in Australia and another in Texas released preliminary research into creating 'daughterless mice' using gene drives in mammals.

==== California ====
In 2017, scientists at the University of California, Riverside developed a gene drive to attack the invasive spotted-wing drosophila, a type of fruit fly native to Asia that is costing California's cherry farms $700 million per year because of its tail's razor-edged ovipositor that destroys unblemished fruit. The primary alternative control strategy involves the use of insecticides called pyrethroids that kill almost all insects that it contacts.

=== Wild animal welfare ===
The transhumanist philosopher David Pearce has advocated for using CRISPR-based gene drives to reduce the suffering of wild animals. Kevin M. Esvelt, an American biologist who has helped develop gene drive technology, has argued that there is a moral case for the elimination of the New World screwworm through such technologies because of the immense suffering that infested wild animals experience when they are eaten alive.

== See also ==
- Biological machines
- Cas9
- Cas12a
- Meiotic drive
- Genome editing
- Population control
- Sterile insect technique
- Synthetic biology
- Target Malaria
