= Animal nutrition =

Science of nutrition for animals

Animal nutrition focuses on the dietary nutrients needs of animals, primarily those in agriculture and food production, but also in zoos, aquariums, and wildlife management.

== Constituents of diet ==
Macronutrients (excluding fiber and water) provide structural material (amino acids from which proteins are built, and lipids from which cell membranes and some signaling molecules are built) and energy. Some of the structural material can be used to generate energy internally, though the net energy depends on such factors as absorption and digestive effort, which vary substantially from instance to instance. Vitamins, minerals, fiber, and water do not provide energy, but are required for other reasons. A third class dietary material, fiber (i.e. non-digestible material such as cellulose), seems also to be required, for both mechanical and biochemical reasons, though the exact reasons remain unclear.

Molecules of carbohydrates and fats consist of carbon, hydrogen, and oxygen atoms. Carbohydrates range from simple monosaccharides (glucose, fructose, galactose) to complex polysaccharides (starch). Fats are triglycerides, made of assorted fatty acid monomers bound to glycerol backbone. Some fatty acids, but not all, are essential in the diet: they cannot be synthesized in the body. Protein molecules contain nitrogen atoms in addition to carbon, oxygen, and hydrogen. The fundamental components of protein are nitrogen-containing amino acids. Essential amino acids cannot be made by the animal. Some of the amino acids are convertible (with the expenditure of energy) to glucose and can be used for energy production just as ordinary glucose. By breaking down existing protein, some glucose can be produced internally; the remaining amino acids are discarded, primarily as urea in urine. This occurs normally only during prolonged starvation.

Other dietary substances found in plant foods (phytochemicals, polyphenols) are not identified as essential nutrients but appear to impact health in both positive and negative ways. Most foods contain a mix of some or all of the nutrient classes, together with other substances. Some nutrients can be stored internally (e.g. the fat soluble vitamins), while others are required more or less continuously. Poor health can be caused by a lack of required nutrients or, in extreme cases, too much of a required nutrient. For example, salt provides sodium and chloride, both essential nutrients, but will cause illness or even death in too large amounts.

Dietary fibre is a carbohydrate (polysaccharide or oligosaccharide) that is incompletely absorbed in some animals.

=== Protein ===
Proteins are the basis of many animal body structures (e.g. muscles, skin, and hair). They also form the enzymes which control chemical reactions throughout the body. Each molecule is composed of amino acids which are characterized by the inclusion of nitrogen and sometimes sulfur. The body requires amino acids to produce new proteins (protein retention) and to replace damaged proteins (maintenance). As there is no protein or amino acid storage provision, amino acids must be present in the diet. Excess amino acids are discarded, typically in the urine. For all animals, some amino acids are essential (an animal cannot produce them internally) and some are non-essential (the animal can produce them from other nitrogen-containing compounds). A diet that contains adequate amounts of amino acids (especially those that are essential) is particularly important in some situations: during early development and maturation, pregnancy, lactation, or injury (a burn, for instance).

A few amino acids from protein can be converted into glucose and used for fuel through a process called gluconeogenesis; this is done in quantity only during starvation.

=== Minerals ===
Dietary minerals are the chemical elements required by living organisms, other than the four elements carbon, hydrogen, nitrogen, and oxygen that are present in nearly all organic molecules. The term "mineral" is archaic, since the intent is to describe simply the less common elements in the diet.

Many elements are essential in relative quantity; they are usually called "bulk minerals". Some are structural, but many play a role as electrolytes. These include:

- Calcium, a common electrolyte, but also needed structurally (for muscle and digestive system health, bones, some forms neutralizes acidity, may help clear toxins, and provide signaling ions for nerve and membrane functions)
- Chlorine as chloride ions; very common electrolyte
- Magnesium, required for processing ATP and related reactions (builds bone, causes strong peristalsis, increases flexibility, increases alkalinity)
- Phosphorus, required component of bones; essential for energy processing
- Potassium, a very common electrolyte (heart and nerve health)
- Sodium, a very common electrolyte
- Sulfur for three amino acids and therefore many proteins (skin, hair, nails, liver, and pancreas)

Many elements are required in trace amounts, usually because they play a catalytic role in enzymes.

=== Vitamins ===
Vitamin deficiencies may result in disease conditions. Excess of some vitamins is also dangerous to health (notably vitamin A), and animal nutrition researchers have managed to establish safe levels for some common companion animals. Deficiency or excess of minerals can also have serious health consequences.

ASH Though not a nutrient as such, an entry for ash is sometimes found on nutrition labels, especially for pet food. This entry measures the weight of inorganic material left over after the food is burned for two hours at 600 °C. Thus, it does not include water, fibre, and nutrients that provide calories, but it does include some nutrients, such as minerals

Too much ash may contribute to feline urological syndrome in domestic cats.

== Intestinal bacterial flora ==
Animal intestines contain a large population of gut flora which are essential to digestion, and are also affected by the food eaten.

== See also ==
- Human nutrition
- Animal nutritionist
