= Ezé Wendtoin =

Burkinese and German musician and activist

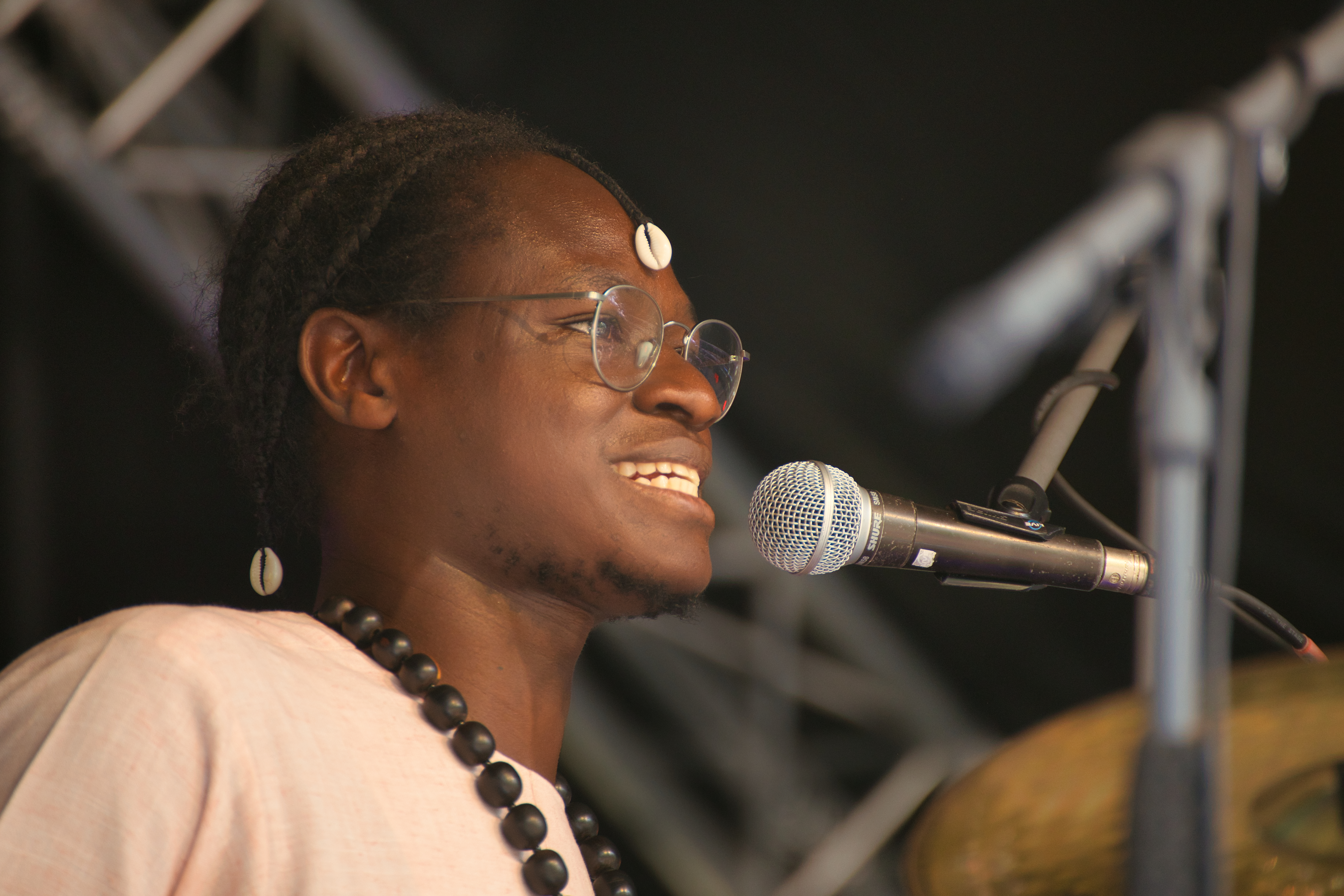
- Wendtoin performing in 2022
- Born: Ezékiel Wendtoin Nikiema; 1991 (age 34–35); Ouagadougou
- Musical career
- Years active: 2015–present
- Labels: Trikont, Nikiema Roots Music
- Website: www.eze-music.com

Ezékiel Wendtoin Nikiema (born 1991), also known as Ezé Wendtoin or just Ezé, is a musician and activist from Burkina Faso who lives in Dresden. He has released 3 studio albums, on which he sings in German, French, and Mooré, and plays drums and guitar.

Wendtoin has founded two non-profit organisations and organised the BurkinAfro Festival in Dresden in 2022.

== Life and career ==
Wendtoin was born in Ouagadougou, Burkina Faso in 1991. He learnt German at school, and obtained a bachelor's degree in Germanistics from the University of Ouagadougou. Wendtoin moved to Germany in 2015 to study a master's degree at TU Dresden.

In Dresden Wendtoin began playing music with collective Banda Internationale. In 2019 his cover version of anti-fascist song "Sage Nein!", written by Konstantin Wecker, brought him wider recognition within Germany. German actors Franziska Weisz, Kida Khodr Ramadan and Frederick Lau appeared in the music video.

Wendtoin's debut album Inzwischen Dazwischen was released in August 2019 on Munich label Trikont Musikverlag. Trikont also released Wendtoin's second album Heute Hier Morgen Deutsch in July 2022. In August 2024 Wendtoin's third album Schwarz Wurde Ich was released on his own label Nikiema Roots Music.

== Discography ==
Albums

- Inzwischen Dazwischen (2019, Trikont)
- Heute Hier Morgen Deutsch (2022, Trikont)
- Schwarz Wurde Ich (2024, Nikiema Roots Music)

Singles

- "Sage Nein!" (2019, Trikont)
