= Short-tailed weasel =

The short-tailed weasel is the common name in North America for two species once considered a single species:

- Stoat or Beringian ermine (Mustela erminea), native to Eurasia and the northern portions of North America
- American ermine (Mustela richardsonii), found in most of North America aside from the northern areas
