= African Leaders Malaria Alliance =

Government organization in New York

The African Leaders Malaria Alliance (ALMA) is an intergovernmental organization dedicated to ending malaria deaths which became operational during the 64th United Nations General Assembly on September 23, 2009. Under the leadership of President Jakaya Kikwete of Tanzania, all African Heads of State and Government have been invited to join the partnership.

The purpose of the Alliance is to provide a forum for high level, collective advocacy to ensure: efficient procurement, distribution, and utilization of malaria control interventions; the sharing of most effective malaria control practices; and ensuring that malaria remains high on the global policy agenda.

All members of ALMA are committed to reaching the United Nations Secretary-General’s goal of ensuring universal access to malaria control interventions by the end of 2010, with the goal of ending preventable malaria deaths by 2015.
