= Joseph Ki-Zerbo University =

University in Burkina Faso

- Université Joseph Ki-Zerbo
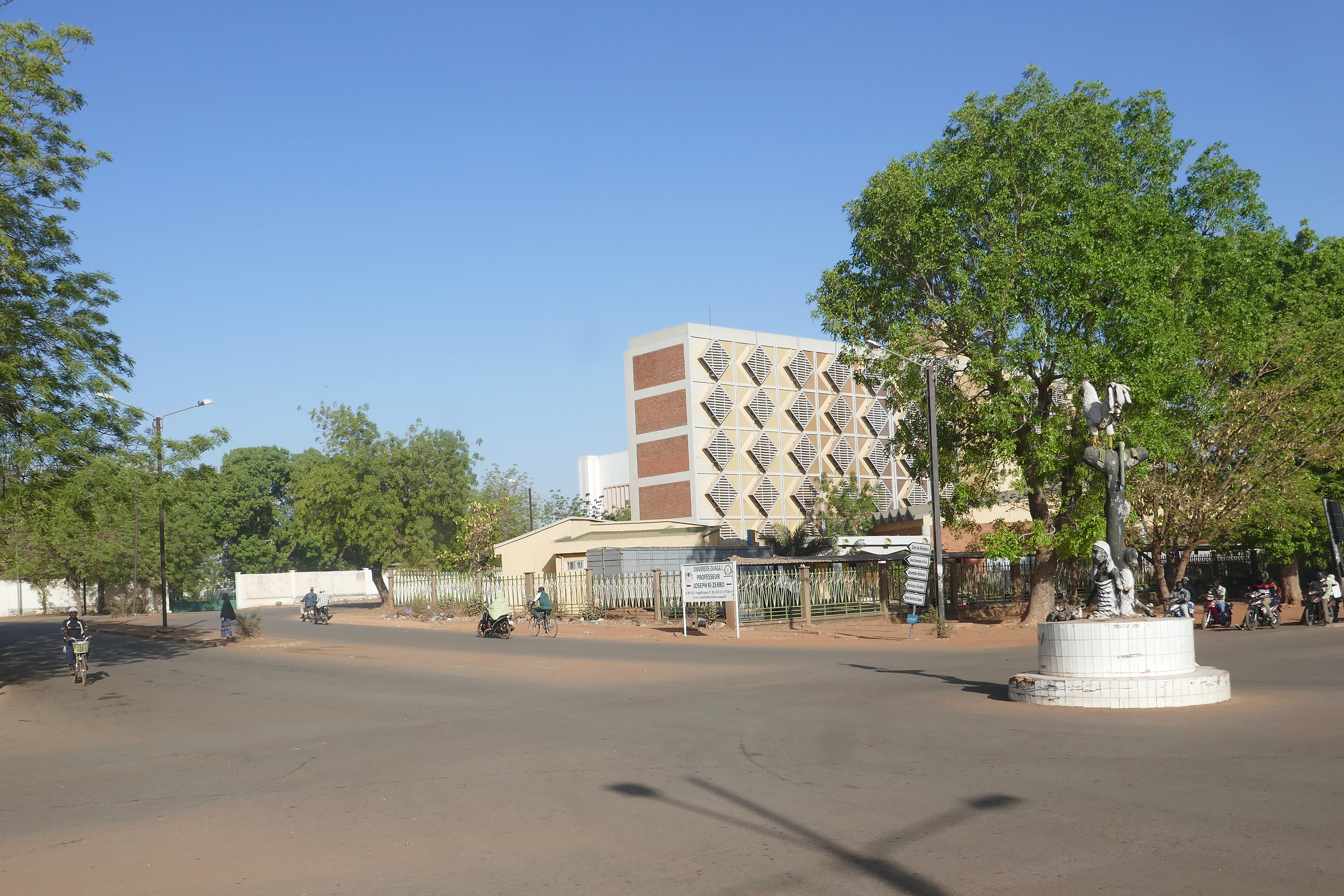
- Former name: University of Ouagadougou
- Type: Public
- Established: 1974; 52 years ago
- Students: 40,000 (2010)
- Location: Ouagadougou, Burkina Faso; 12°22′38″N 1°30′03″W
- Campus: Urban
- Nickname: UO
- Website: University website

The Joseph Ki-Zerbo University, formerly known as University of Ouagadougou, is a public university located in Ouagadougou, Burkina Faso. Founded in 1974, it was officially renamed in 2015. It consists of seven Training and Research Units (UFR) and one institute. In 1995 a second campus for professional education known as the Université Polytechnique de Bobo was opened in the city of Bobo Dioulasso. A third campus for teacher's training was opened in Koudougou in 1996, it became the University of Koudougou in 2005.

The university had around 40,000 students in 2010 (83% of the national population of university students).

== Academics ==
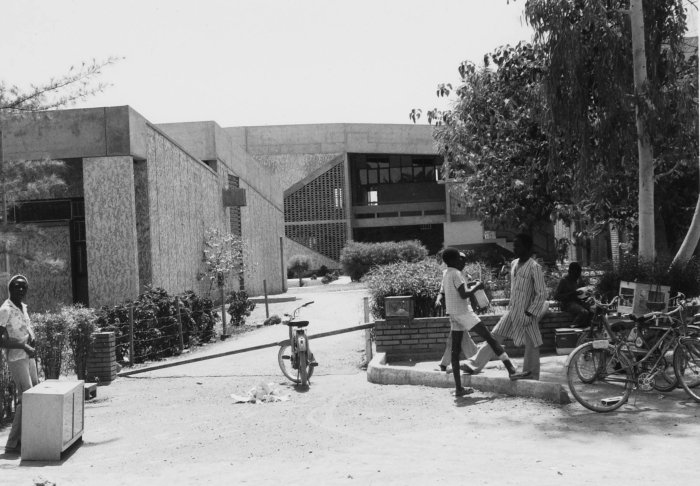
University of Ouagadougou, 1979

=== Academic departments and program ===
The University of Ouagadougou (2005A) consists of seven Training and Research Units (UFR) and one institute: UFR Languages, Arts and Communications; UFR Human sciences; UFR Legal and Political Sciences; UFR Economic Sciences and Management; UFR Applied Sciences; UFR Health Sciences; UFR Life and Earth Sciences and Burkinabé Institute of Arts and Crafts. It combines the advantages of faculty (fundamental teaching) and those of an institute (professionalization).

The system used is the modular education system based on academic credits, which combines fundamental and professional training.

=== UFR Languages, Arts and Communications ===
For the UFR Languages, Arts and Communications (UFR/LAC) there are two courses: Arts and Communications and in letters, languages and linguistics. The unit was created in 2000 and trains students in languages, letters, arts, culture, communication and journalism. The UFR has 2,440 students. For admission, students should have the level of secondary education. For those without that level, an exam is taken.

Students of the faculty take the DEUG (university diploma) after the first cycle, the bachelor's degree and master in communication and journalism and in interpreting after the second cycle. The last one is the postgraduate diploma and the PhD in linguistics and modern letters taken after the third cycle.

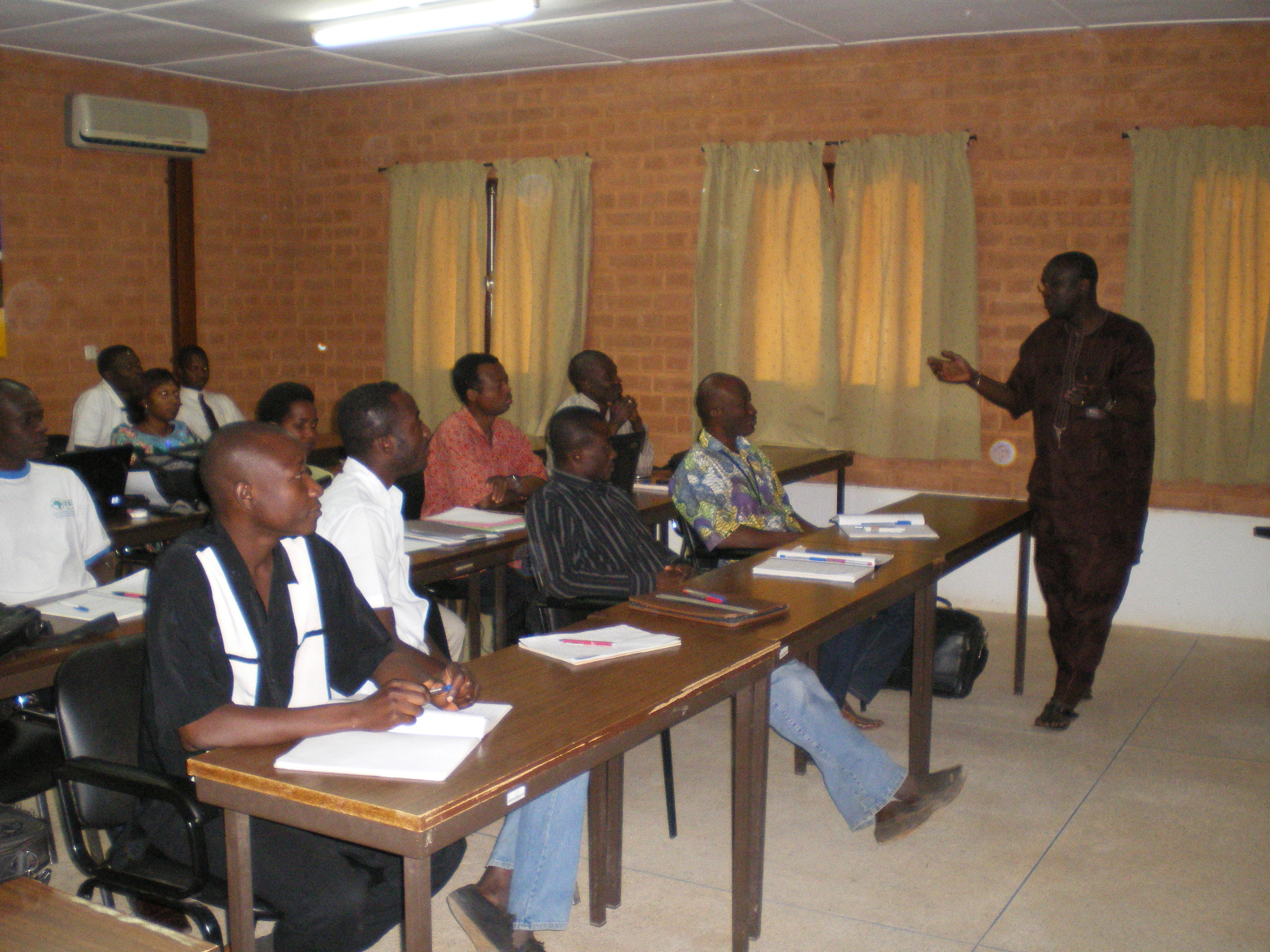
Master students at the university, 2010

=== UFR Human Sciences ===
The UFR Human Sciences (UFR/SH) is made up of two branches: History-Geography and Archaeology. It includes four departments and two projects. It has 82 teachers for 4,004 students and five student laboratories. The degrees that students take during their studies or at the end are the DEUG, the bachelor's degree, the master and the PhD according to their major.

=== UFR Legal and Politic Sciences ===
The UFR Legal and Politic Sciences (UFR/SJP) was created in 1975 with two sections: one in Law and Political Science, and the other in Criminology. The UFR trains jurists for the private and public sectors, to promote research in the legal domain, to publish work and researchers publication. For the 2004-2005 academic year there were 25 teachers for 3,189 students.

The UFR/SJP awards the following degrees: DEUG I, DEUG II (university diploma) Bachelor's degree, Master, DESS (postgraduate diploma) and soon DEA and PhD.

=== UFR Applied Sciences ===
The UFR Applied Sciences (UFR/SEA) was created in 2000. It has three departments — Mathematics and Computer, Physics, and Chemistry — and 12 laboratories available for students. Like the other UFRs, the UFR/SEA awards the same degrees according to the student's major.

=== UFR Health Sciences ===
The UFR Health Sciences (UFR/SDS) was created in 1980 and the UFR Life and Heart Sciences (UFR/SVT).

The first one has three branches: courses in medicine with five departments; courses in pharmacy with three departments and health of superior technicians. The faculty prepares doctors, pharmacists, dental surgeons and qualified technicians for hospitals and clinics. The UFR Life and Hearth Sciences (UFR/SVT) is composed of two sections: the life sciences and earth sciences. The same degrees are delivered as the other faculties.

The UFR/SDS has 11 laboratories. Diplomas delivered are the degree of Doctor State in Medicine, the degree of Doctor State in Pharmacy, the professionalized licence in biomedical analyses, the certificate of special studies in general surgery, obstetrics-gynecology, paediatrics and psychiatry. The UFR Health Sciences has 21 laboratories.

=== UFR Life and Earth Sciences ===
The UFR Life and Earth Sciences (UFR/SVT) has four departments: Biology and Animal Physiology, Biology and Plant Physiology, Biochemistry and Microbiology, and Geology. It houses the largest plant collection in Burkina Faso: the Herbarium of the University of Ouagadougou.

=== The Burkinabé Institute of Arts and Crafts ===
The institute has the following branches: Secretariat of direction, bilingual secretariat of direction, finance-accounting/commercial management, bank-insurance, control sciences and data-processing technology methods applied to management. Telecommunication, architecture and town planning and civil engineering are segments that will open soon.

The institute gives students two years of theoretical and practical teaching. At the end students get the DUT degree.

== Notable people ==
=== Faculty ===
- Yvonne Libona Bonzi Coulibaly, Chemistry Professor, Director General of Burkina Faso's Institute of Sciences

=== Alumni ===
- Angèle Bassolé-Ouédraogo, poet and journalist
- Abdoulaye Diabaté, scientist
- Monique Ilboudo, author and human rights activist
- Chantal Kaboré-Zoungrana, animal nutritionist and biosecurity expert
- Marie Korsaga, astrophysicist
- Stanislas Ouaro, politician and mathematician
- Marie Françoise Ouedraogo, mathematician
- Minata Samaté Cessouma, diplomat
- Siméon Sawadogo, politician
- Antoine Somdah, statesman
- Paul Kaba Thieba, 8th Prime Minister of Burkina Faso
- Ibrahim Traoré, President of Burkina Faso
- Karamoko Jean-Marie Traoré, Foreign Minister of Burkina Faso
- Paramanga Ernest Yonli, 4th Prime Minister of Burkina Faso
- Ezé Wendtoin, musician and activist

== See also ==
- List of Islamic educational institutions
- Education in Burkina Faso
