= Nazi Boni University =

Public university in Houet, Burkina Faso

- Université Nazi Boni (French)
- Former names: Polytechnic University of Bobo-Dioulasso
- Type: Public
- Established: 1995; 31 years ago
- Students: 2,600 (2010/2011)
- Location: Bobo-Dioulasso, Burkina Faso; 11.210°N 4.419°W
- Campus: Urban

The Nazi Boni University (Université Nazi Boni), founded as the Polytechnic University of Bobo-Dioulasso is a public university in Bobo-Dioulasso, Houet Province, Burkina Faso. It is one of three public universities in Burkina Faso (the others are the University of Koudougou and the University of Ouagadougou).

== History ==
The university was opened in 1995. It was set up as a polytechnic university centre under the University of Ouagadougou to teach both professional and vocational courses. In 1997, following a decree from the President of Burkina Faso, the university centre was granted its own independent university status under the name of the Polytechnic University of Bobo-Dioulasso. It became one of three public universities in Burkina Faso. In the 2010-11 academic year, the government of France noted that the university had around 2,600 students.

In 2017, it was renamed Nazi Boni University, in honor of Nazi Boni. In 2018, the Burkina Faso Council of Ministers ratified the move and approved appointing teachers to the status of professors and lecturers. In 2022, Nazi Boni University experienced a student strike from the Higher Institute of Health Sciences students on the grounds that the texts they were expected to study were inadequate as well as for provision of face masks and vaccinations whilst they were undergoing medical training at the university. This came after a previously planned student protest had been broken up by an armed mob in March 2022. Other student protests had also been physically broken up by the Burkina Faso National Police.
