= Target Malaria =

Target Malaria is a not-for-profit international research consortium that aims to co-develop and share novel genetic technologies to help control malaria in Africa. The consortium brings together research institutes and universities from Africa, Europe and North America.

The project is working to develop genetically modified mosquitoes that carry a trait that would result in the reduction of malaria mosquito populations. Reducing the number of mosquitoes that can transmit the malaria parasite would lead to fewer malaria infections. The project’s novel genetic approach aims to be complementary to existing malaria control interventions. The project’s research is still at an early stage, and even though results so far have been promising, there is a long way to go.

== The malaria burden in Africa ==
Every year, malaria kills half a million people and infects over 200 million people; a third of the world is at risk of contracting this disease transmitted by mosquitoes. The majority of the victims are children under the age of five living in Africa. While all regions in the world have made tremendous progress towards control and elimination of malaria, Africa accounts for 94% of malaria deaths in the world.

== New vector control tools ==
According to the World Malaria Report 2020 published by the World Health Organization, despite tremendous progress in reducing malaria around the world, since 2015 this progress has slowed, stalling in the last three years. Current interventions, such as drug treatments, bed nets and insecticide spraying, have helped to lower the burden of malaria but have not been able to eradicate the disease in many countries. WHO warns that the global response to malaria has reached a “crossroads”: if new tools are not found, key targets of WHO’s global malaria strategy will likely be missed.

== Gene drive for malaria control ==
Target Malaria is adapting a natural mechanism called a gene drive. The genetically modified mosquitoes carry a trait that targets their ability to reproduce. Gene drive ensures this modification is inherited at a higher rate than it normally would, thus reducing the fertility of the mosquito populations over time and ultimately their numbers. Gene drive technologies hold the promise of being a self-sustaining and cost-effective method to help in the fight against malaria by reducing the population of malaria mosquitoes. The WHO stated in its Position Statement on the evaluation and use of GMMs for the control of vector-borne diseases published on October 14, 2020: "In the spirit of fostering innovation, WHO takes the position that all potentially beneficial new technologies, including GMMs, should be investigated to determine whether they could be useful in the continued fight against diseases of public health concern. Such research should be conducted in steps and be supported by clear governance mechanisms to evaluate the health, environmental and ecological implications."

== History and funding ==
Target Malaria started as a university-based research programme in 2005. Since 2012, the project has expanded to include scientists, social scientists, stakeholder engagement experts, regulatory affairs experts, project management teams, risk assessment specialists and communications professionals from Africa, Europe, and North America. The project receives core funding from the Bill and Melinda Gates Foundation. and from the Open Philanthropy Project Fund, an advised fund of Silicon Valley Community Foundation. Individual labs also received additional funding from a variety of sources to support their work, including but not limited to: DEFRA, The European Commission, MRC, NIH, Uganda Ministry of Health, Uganda National Council for Science & Technology, Wellcome Trust and the World Bank.

=== List of partner institutions ===
- CDC Foundation, USA
- Imperial College London, UK
- Institut de Recherche en Sciences de la Santé – IRSS (Research Institute for Health Sciences, Burkina Faso)
- Polo d’Innovazione di Genomica, Genetica e Biologia – PoloGGB, Italy
- Uganda Virus Research Institute, Uganda
- University of Ghana, Ghana
- University of Oxford, UK

== See also ==
- Gene drive
- Oxitec
- Rat guard

== Sources ==
- World Health Organization (WHO) Vector Control Advisory Group, Fifth Meeting - 2017 http://apps.who.int/iris/bitstream/handle/10665/255824/WHO-HTM-NTD-VEM-2017.02-eng.pdf;jsessionid=2E6C156B21FBFC7C1C42ACB251E6DCD8?sequence=1
- World Health Organization (WHO) Global Technical Strategy for Malaria 2016-2030 – 2015 http://apps.who.int/iris/bitstream/handle/10665/176712/9789241564991_eng.pdf?sequence=1
- Jennifer Khan (8 January 2020) The Gene Drive Dilemma: We Can Alter Entire Species, but Should We? The New York Times Magazine
- Ryan, Jackson (6 February 2019). "The CRISPR machines that can wipe out entire species". CNET. Retrieved 20 February 2019
- Stein, Rob (20 February 2019). "Scientists Release Controversial Genetically Modified Mosquitoes In High-Security Lab". WBUR-FM. Retrieved 20 February 2019.
- Arie, Sophie (5 February 2019). "GM mosquitoes: playing with God or the only way to wipe out malaria?". The Daily Telegraph. Retrieved 20 February 2019.
- Zhang, Sarah (24 September 2018). "No One Knows Exactly What Would Happen If Mosquitoes Were to Disappear". The Atlantic. Retrieved 20 February 2019.
- Molteni, Megan (24 September 2018). "HERE'S THE PLAN TO END MALARIA WITH CRISPR-EDITED MOSQUITOES". Wired. Retrieved 20 February 2019.
