= 2025 in Burkina Faso =

- Decades: 2000s; 2010s; 2020s
- See also: Other events of 2025; Timeline of Burkinabé history

Events in the year 2025 in Burkina Faso.

== Incumbents ==
- President: Ibrahim Traoré
- Prime Minister: Jean Emmanuel Ouédraogo
- President of the Patriotic Movement for Safeguard and Restoration: Ibrahim Traoré

== Events ==
=== January ===
- 18 January – Four Moroccan truck drivers are abducted along the border with Niger. They are subsequently released in the latter country on 21 January.
- 22 January – Niger announces the creation of a joint military force with Burkina Faso and Mali to combat extremist groups.
- 29 January – Burkina Faso, along with Niger and Mali, formally leave ECOWAS.

=== March ===
- 10–11 March – At least 130 members of the Fulani ethnic group are reported to have been killed in a security operation in Solenzo.
- 17 March – Burkina Faso withdraws from the Organisation internationale de la Francophonie.
- 24 March – Guezouma Sanogo, the president of the Burkina Faso’s Journalists Association, his vice president Boukari Ouoba, and a third journalist are arrested, with the group dissolved the next day.
- 31 March – The junta issues an amnesty to 21 soldiers convicted for their role in the 2015 Burkina Faso coup attempt.

=== April ===
- 6 April – Burkina Faso, Niger and Mali withdraw their ambassadors from Algeria as part of protests against claims by Algiers that it had shot down a drone near the Malian border on 31 March.
- 21 April – The government announces that it had thwarted a coup attempt.
- 25 April – The government grants an industrial mining licence to the Russian firm Nordgold to develop the Niou gold deposit in Kourwéogo Province.

=== May ===
- 11 May –
  - More than 100 people are reported killed in an attack by JNIM jihadists on the town of Djibo.
  - JNIM militants allegedly kill 60 soldiers in an attack in Loroum Province.
- 15 May – Insurgents parade openly in Diapaga, tearing down the flags of the military junta and of Russia.

=== July ===
- 17 July – The junta abolishes the Independent National Electoral Commission, citing issues of foreign influence and financing, and transfers responsibility for overseeing elections to the interior ministry.
- 28 July – Around 50 soldiers are killed in an attack by suspected JNIM militants on a military base in Boulsa Department.

=== August ===
- 3 August – Four Moroccan truck drivers taken hostage by Islamic State – Sahel Province in Burkina Faso while driving from Morocco to Niger in January are released in Mali.
- 18 August – The government declares United Nations resident coordinator Carol Flore-Smereczniak persona non grata over the publication of an official UN report accusing it and jihadist groups of committing abuses against children from 2022 to 2024.

=== September ===
- 1 September – The junta outlaws homosexuality and issues a prison term of five years for anyone identifying as a member of the LGBT community.
- 11 September – The junta abolishes fees for visas for all African citizens.
- 16 September – Sierra Leonean president and ECOWAS chair Julius Maada Bio meets with President Traoré in Ouagadougou, marking the first visit by an ECOWAS leader to Burkina Faso since its withdrawal from the bloc.
- 22 September – Mali, Burkina Faso and Niger jointly announce their withdrawal from the International Criminal Court, accusing it of selective justice.

=== October ===
- 7 October – The junta announces the arrest of eight employees of the International NGO Safety Organisation, on charges of espionage and treason. The arrested individuals include four foreign nationals.
- 9 October – The US embassy suspends the issuance of visas to Burkinabe nationals amid a dispute over the deportation of migrants from the United States.

=== December ===
- 8 December – A Nigerian Air Force aircraft flying to Portugal makes an emergency landing in Bobo-Dioulasso, triggering a heightened military alert by Burkina Faso and other members of the Alliance of Sahel States.
- 16 December – US President Donald Trump issues a proclamation barring Burkinabe nationals from entering the United States.
- 21 December –
  - Construction of the Ouagadougou-Bobo-Dioulasso Expressway is inaugurated by President Traore.
  - Burkina Faso, Mali and Niger launch a joint security force under the auspices of the Alliance of Sahel States headed by Burkinabe General Daouda Traoré.
- 30 December – Burkina Faso announces a reciprocal travel ban on U.S. citizens in response to the ban issued by the Trump administration on Burkinabe nationals.

== Art and entertainment ==
- List of Burkinabé submissions for the Academy Award for Best International Feature Film

== Holidays ==
- 1 January – New Year's Day
- 3 January – Revolution Day
- 8 March – International Women's Day
- 30 March – Korité
- 21 April – Easter Monday
- 1 May – Labour Day
- 29 May – Ascension Day
- 6 June – Tabaski
- 5 July – Tamkharit
- 5 August – Independence Day
- 15 August – Assumption Day
- 4 September – The Prophet's Birthday
- 31 October – Martyrs' Day
- 1 November – All Saints' Day
- 11 December – Proclamation of Independence Day
- 25 December – Christmas Day

== Deaths ==
- 14 September – Safiatou Lopez, 49, businesswoman and political activist
- 7 December – Joseph Sirima Bissiri, 72, politician, Burkina Faso MNA.
