= 2026 in Burkina Faso =

- Decades: 2000s; 2010s; 2020s
- See also: Other events of 2026; Timeline of Burkinabé history

Events in the year 2026 in Burkina Faso.

== Incumbents ==
- President: Ibrahim Traoré
- Prime Minister: Jean Emmanuel Ouédraogo
- President of the Patriotic Movement for Safeguard and Restoration: Ibrahim Traoré

== Events ==
=== January ===
- 1 January –
  - The government bans US nationals from the country.
  - An initiative to digitalize the justice system is announced.
- 5 January – The government announces that it had foiled a coup plot.
- 10 January – Former government minister Yolande Viviane Compaoré is found murdered inside her residence in Ouagadougou.
- 17–18 January – Eleven police officers are killed in an attack on a police detachment in Balga, Gourma Province, Est Region. The JNIM claims responsibility.
- 20 January – Former president Paul-Henri Sandaogo Damiba is extradited from Togo to face charges of plotting a coup.
- 27 January – The Transitional National Assembly unanimously ratifies the Vienna Convention on Civil Liability for Nuclear Damage.
- 29 January – The military government dissolves all political parties and repealed the laws governing them, transferring party assets to the state following a decree approved by the council of ministers.

=== February ===
- 14 February – JNIM militants kill seven Ghanaian tomato traders in an attack on Titao, Loroum Province.
- 22 February – JNIM militants kill four people in an attack on Manni.

=== March ===
- 15 March – JNIM militants kill 12 people in an attack on Dourtenga.

=== April ===
- 15 April – The government announces the dissolution of 118 associations and civil society groups.
- 22 April – JNIM militants attack a military base in Bagmoussa, Koulpelogo, killing 28 soldiers and militiamen.
- 24 April – The government creates a new military reserve, with the goal of training 100,000 reservists by the end of the year.

=== May ===
- 5 May –
  - The government bans TV5Monde broadcasts, accusing it of disinformation and glorification of terrorism.
  - The government announces the dissolution of 205 associations and civil society groups.
- 26 May – Mohamed Kindo, a prominent Muslim preacher, is arrested by the government for criticising a new law that regulates religious practices, triggering protests in Ouagadougou.

=== June ===
- 8 June – The junta suspends beauty pageants nationwide.
- 26 June – Burkina Faso breaks off diplomatic relations with France.

=== October ===
- 20 October – Parliament unanimously adopts a revised criminal code restoring the death penalty for crimes including terrorism, espionage, treason and importing expired or banned products that cause death.

== Art and entertainment ==
- List of Burkinabé submissions for the Academy Award for Best International Feature Film

== Holidays ==
- 1 January – New Year's Day
- 3 January – Revolution Day
- 8 March – International Women's Day
- 30 March – Korité
- 21 April – Easter Monday
- 1 May – Labour Day
- 29 May – Ascension Day
- 6 June – Tabaski
- 5 July – Tamkharit
- 5 August – Independence Day
- 15 August – Assumption Day
- 4 September – The Prophet's Birthday
- 31 October – Martyrs' Day
- 1 November – All Saints' Day
- 11 December – Proclamation of Independence Day
- 25 December – Christmas Day

== Deaths ==
- 25 May – Honoré Traoré, 68, general, head of state (2014)
- 25 May – Ben Aziz Zagré, 27, footballer (Kaisar, Shinnik Yaroslavl, national team)
- 27 June – Dramane Yaméogo, politician, minister of justice (2012–2014).
