= 2022 in Burkina Faso =

- Decades: 2000s; 2010s; 2020s
- See also: Other events of 2022; Timeline of Burkinabé history

== Incumbents ==
- President: Roch Marc Christian Kaboré (until January 24); Paul-Henri Sandaogo Damiba (until 30 September); Ibrahim Traoré onwards
- Prime Minister: Lassina Zerbo (until January 24), Albert Ouédraogo (from March 3 until September 30), Apollinaire Joachim Kyélem de Tambèla (since October 21)
- President of the Patriotic Movement for Safeguard and Restoration (since January 24): Paul-Henri Sandaogo Damiba (from January 24 until September 30), Ibrahim Traoré (since September 30)

== Events ==
=== January–March ===
- 16–27 January - January 2022 Burkina Faso coup d'état: A coup to oust president Kaboré over alleged insecurity has sparked massive demands to oust and to support the military transition government.
- 21 January - Coup: Facebook is banned due to sparks on major disinformation about the coup.
- 24 January - Coup: Kaboré is finally ousted by the armed forces, led by the Patriotic Movement for Safeguard and Restoration.
- 10 February - Ten Ansar ul Islam Islamist insurgents and four civilians are killed during a battle between the French Armed Forces and Islamists. The incident is part of the country's jihadist insurgency.
- 12 February -
  - Forty jihadists are killed by a French airstrike after terrorists kill nine people in W National Park, Benin.
  - 12 February - Islamists raid a Catholic seminary in the Roman Catholic Diocese of Fada N'Gourma, setting several rooms on fire. The militants also destroy a crucifix.
- 16/17 February - Siege of Djibo begins
- 21 February - Gbomblora explosion: About 60 people were killed and over 100 people were injured in the gold mine explosion.

=== April–June ===
- 25 May - May 2022 Madjoari massacre: At least 50 civilians were shot dead by armed assailants.
- 12 June - 2022 Seytenga massacre: At least 100 civilians were killed, with at least 79 deaths confirmed by authorities.

=== July–September ===
- 9 August - 2022 Namsiguia bombing: 15 Burkinabe soldiers were killed.
- 24 September - A French serviceman, Maxime Blasco, is killed in a shootout with jihadists in a forest near Mali's border with Burkina Faso. The gunman who shot Blasco was also killed during the clash, according to the Ministry of Armed Forces.
- 30 September - September 2022 Burkina Faso coup d'état: Gunfire breaks out in the Burkinabe capital Ouagadougou, raising concerns of a possible mutiny or coup attempt in the country. Military forces block major roads and the state television is disabled. Interim President Paul-Henri Sandaogo Damiba was removed over his alleged inability to deal with the country's Islamist insurgency, and Captain Ibrahim Traoré took over as interim leader.

=== October–December ===
- 4 October - Twelve Burkinabé troops are killed and five others are wounded in an attack in the northern Sanmatenga Province. No group has claimed responsibility for the ambush assault.
- 11 October - 1987 Burkinabé coup d'état: The trial for the 1987 assassination of former leader of Burkina Faso Thomas Sankara, known as the "African Che Guevara", begins in Ouagadougou against 14 people, including former president Blaise Compaoré, who will be tried in absentia.
- 31 October - Gunmen open fire against security forces in Sourou, Burkina Faso, killing five policemen. Fifteen attackers are killed in a gunfight after the attack.
- 9 November - Security forces in Togo repel an attack at a security outpost in Kpendjal Prefecture in the far north of the country, pushing back the attackers to Burkina Faso. It is the first Islamist incident in Togo.
- 14 November - Gunmen open fire at a military post near a gold mine in Inata, Soum Province, Burkina Faso, killing 19 gendarmes and a civilian.
- 15 November - The death toll from yesterday's mass shooting at a military post near a gold mine in Inata, Soum Province, Burkina Faso, increases to 32, including 28 gendarmes and four civilians, making the attack the deadliest against security forces in the country.
- 17 November - The death toll from the attack at a military post in Inata, Soum Province, Burkina Faso, three days ago, increases to 53, including 49 gendarmes and four civilians.
- 22 November - Gunmen open fire at a security post in Sanmatenga, Burkina Faso, killing ten civilians and nine gendarmes. Another person is injured and a healthcare center is burned.
- 23 December - Gunmen ambush a column of a civilian militia in Loroum, Burkina Faso, killing 41 people. It is one of the deadliest single-day attack against the militia.
