= 2023 in Burkina Faso =

- Decades: 2000s; 2010s; 2020s
- See also: Other events of 2023; Timeline of Burkinabé history

== Incumbents ==
- President: Ibrahim Traoré
- Prime Minister: Apollinaire Joachim Kyélem de Tambèla
- President of the Patriotic Movement for Safeguard and Restoration: Ibrahim Traoré

== Events ==
=== January–March ===
- 3 January – Twenty-eight civilians are found dead in the town of Nouna, in northwest Burkina Faso. Burkinabe human rights groups allege that the killings were perpetrated by pro-government militia VDP on December 15, 18, and 22.
- 11 January – Nine Ahmadi Muslims are killed by Wahhabi Islamist terrorists in local Ahmadi mosque in Mahdi Abad, a village near the town of Dori.
- 20 January – The Burkina Faso Armed Forces rescue 62 women and four babies kidnapped by jihadists in Arbinda, Sahel Region, on January 15.
- 21 January – Burkina Faso demands that French forces withdraw from its territory after suspending a 2018 military accord that allowed the presence of French troops in the country. The ruling military junta has given France one month to complete the withdrawal.
- 25 January – France agrees to withdraw its 400 special forces from Burkina Faso, following the Saturday mandate from the ruling military junta that they withdraw within a month.
- 10 February – Médecins Sans Frontières (MSF) suspends its operations in north-west Burkina Faso following the killings of two of its Burkinabe aid workers near Dédougou.
- 22 March – Ten volunteers and four Burkina Faso Armed Forces soldiers are killed during an ambush in Centre-Nord Region. Twenty attackers are killed.
- 27 March – Burkina Faso suspends France 24 broadcasts after the news agency aired an interview with the leader of al-Qaeda in the Islamic Maghreb earlier this month. The Burkinabé government accused France 24 of being a "mouthpiece for terrorists" and "hate speech", which the agency denies as "unfounded".
- 29 March – Burkina Faso formally resumes diplomatic relations with North Korea after suspending them in 2017 over the country's nuclear weapons program.

=== April ===
- 6 April –
  - Kourakou and Tondobi attacks: At least 44 people are killed by jihadists in two villages in Séno Province, Sahel Region.
  - 2023 Burkina Faso attacks

=== June ===
- 27 June – Suspected jihadists kill several Burkinabe soldiers and Volunteers for the Defense of the Homeland members in a series of attacks against the troops in the village of Noaka in Pissila Department, Sanmatenga Province, and in the Sahel Region.
- 29 June – Burkina Faso's military government has taken action against a French television news channel La Chaine Info (LCI), suspending it due to concerns over objectivity and credibility in its report on the country's jihadist insurgency.

=== September ===
- 5 September – 2023 Yatenga Province clashes: Seventeen Burkinabé soldiers, thirty-six VDP militiamen, and several dozen Jama'at Nasr al-Islam wal Muslimin militants are killed during fighting in Yatenga Province.
- September 16 – The military governments of Niger, Mali, and Burkina Faso sign a mutual defence pact named the Alliance of Sahel States in case of internal rebellion or external military aggression.
- September 28 – 2023 Burkina Faso coup d'état attempt: The ruling junta of Burkina Faso arrests four officers suspected of attempting to stage a coup.

=== October ===
- October 18 – Burkina Faso’s health ministry declared a dengue fever epidemic after the country saw its deadliest outbreak of the disease in years. Over 200 people have died and new cases are increasing rapidly.

=== November ===
- November 5 – At least 70 people were killed in a massacre in the village of Zaongo. The perpetrators of the attack are unknown.
- November 26 – About 3,000 JNIM launched a wave of attacks in an attempt to seize the town of Djibo, resulting in the deaths of several Burkinabe soldiers, 40 civilians, and over 400 attackers.

=== December ===
- On 17 December, a reshuffle took place where Ibrahim Traoré replaced foreign minister Olivia Rouamba with Karamoko Jean-Marie Traoré, named Stella Kabre as the new regional cooperation minister, and replaced mining minister Jean-Pierre Boussim with Yacouba Zabre Gouba.
