= 2024 in Burkina Faso =

- Decades: 2000s; 2010s; 2020s
- See also: Other events of 2024; Timeline of Burkinabé history

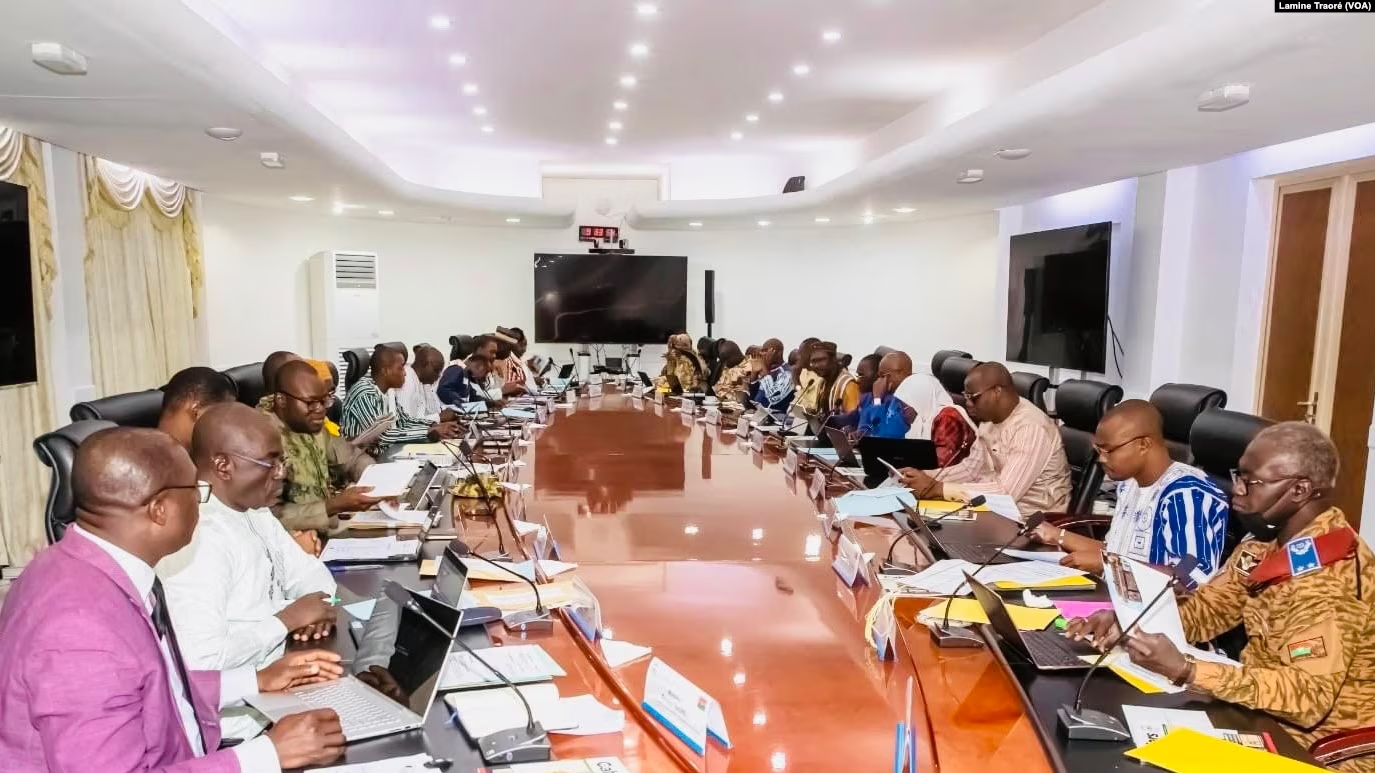
The Council of Ministers of the Tambèla Cabinet in Ouagadougou (Burkina Faso), on January 8, 2024.

Events in the year 2024 in Burkina Faso.

== Incumbents ==
- President: Ibrahim Traoré
- Prime Minister: Apollinaire Joachim Kyélem de Tambèla (until 6 December); Jean Emmanuel Ouédraogo (since 7 December)
- President of the Patriotic Movement for Safeguard and Restoration: Ibrahim Traoré

== Events ==
=== February ===
- 25 February –
  - Fifteen people are killed and two more injured during an attack on a Catholic Church in the village of Essakane, Oudalan Province.
  - Dozens of people are killed during an attack at a mosque in Natiaobani.
  - Nondin and Soro massacres: Members of the Burkina Faso Armed Forces summarily execute 223 people in Yatenga Province over alleged complicity with jihadists.

=== March ===
- 6 March – A private aircraft carrying seven passengers crashes into a tree during takeoff from Diapaga to Fada N’Gourma, killing five people on board.
- 7 March –
  - The Alliance of Sahel States, comprising Mali, Burkina Faso and Niger, announce the creation of a joint force between the three countries to combat jihadist groups in the three countries.
  - Ram Joseph Kafando is installed as governor of Est Region, Burkina Faso, replacing Hubert Yameogo.

=== April ===
- 18 April – Three French diplomats are expelled from the country by the Burkinabe government, citing alleged involvement in “subversive activities”.
- 25 April – The Burkinabe government bans BBC Radio and Voice of America from broadcasting in the country for two weeks over its reportage on massacres committed by the army.

=== May ===
- 17 May – An armed assailant is "subdued" after attacking guards stationed at the Presidential Palace in Ouagadougou.
- 25 May – The junta extends its tenure until 2029 and ratifies a new constitution.

=== June ===
- 5 June – Russian Foreign Minister Sergei Lavrov announces that Russia will dispatch additional military supplies and instructors to Burkina Faso to help them boost its defense capabilities.
- 11 June – More than 100 soldiers are killed in an attack claimed by the Jama'at Nasr al-Islam wal Muslimin on a military base in Mansila.
- 12 June – Two people are injured in a shooting incident inside the premises of the state broadcaster RTB in Ouagadougou.
- 18 June – The Burkinabe government bans TV5 Monde from broadcasting in the country for six months for allegedly spreading "malicious insinuations" and "disinformation" against it.

=== July ===
- 7 July – ECOWAS states that it risks disintegrating from military and economic insecurity if Niger, Mali, and Burkina Faso continue their exit to form their own confederation, following sanctions and severed diplomatic ties after each state's military coup.
- 12 July – Justice Minister Edasso Rodrigue Bayala announces a ban on homosexuality in the country.
- 31 July – Mali announces that it carried out joint airstrikes with Burkina Faso on insurgents in and around Tinzaouaten. The CSP-PSD says that a Burkinabe drone strike killed dozens of civilians.

=== August ===
- 21 August – Burkina Faso, Mali and Niger write to the United Nations Security Council complaining that Ukraine is supporting rebel groups in the Sahel region.
- 24 August – Two hundred people are killed in an attack in Barsalogho Department that is claimed by Jama'at Nasr al-Islam wal-Muslimin.
- 26 August – Denmark closes its embassy in Ouagadougou, citing the effects of military coups on its "scope of action".

=== September ===
- 23 September – The junta announces that it had discovered a three-stage plot to destabilise the country “with the help of foreign powers” and individuals based in Ivory Coast. It also claims that the Barsalogho massacre in August is also part of the plot.

=== October ===
- 7 October – The junta bans the Voice of America from broadcasting in the country for three months over its reportage on the Islamist insurgency in the Sahel.
- 9 October – Activist Maimouna Ba is awarded the Nansen Refugee Award by the United Nations High Commissioner for Refugees, citing her work in helping displaced children return to school.

=== December ===
- 6 December – The junta dismisses Apollinaire J. Kyélem de Tambèla as prime minister and dissolves his cabinet.
- 7 December – The junta appoints communications minister and government spokesperson Jean Emmanuel Ouédraogo as prime minister.
- 16 December – ECOWAS approves the withdrawal of Burkina Faso, Mali and Niger from the bloc effective January 2025 but gives them until July 2025 to reconsider.
- 19 December – Four French soldiers detained in Ouagadougou on charges of spying since 2023 are released following negotiations between the Burkinabe government and France mediated by Morocco.
- 21 December – The government declares an amnesty for people convicted for participating in the 2015 Burkina Faso coup attempt.

== Art and entertainment ==
- List of Burkinabé submissions for the Academy Award for Best International Feature Film

== Holidays ==
- 1 January - New Year's Day
- 3 January - Revolution Day
- 8 March - International Women's Day
- 1 April - Easter Monday
- 10 April – Korité
- 1 May - Labour Day
- 20 May - Whit Monday
- 17 June – Tabaski
- 16 July – Tamkharit
- 5 August - Independence Day
- 15 August - Assumption Day
- 15 September – The Prophet's Birthday
- 31 October - Martyrs' Day
- 1 November - All Saints' Day
- 11 December - Proclamation of Independence Day
- 25 December - Christmas Day

== Deaths ==
- 30 January – Bognessan Arsène Yé, 66, politician.
