= Popular Progressive Revolution =

Burkina Faso government program

- Part of the coup belt
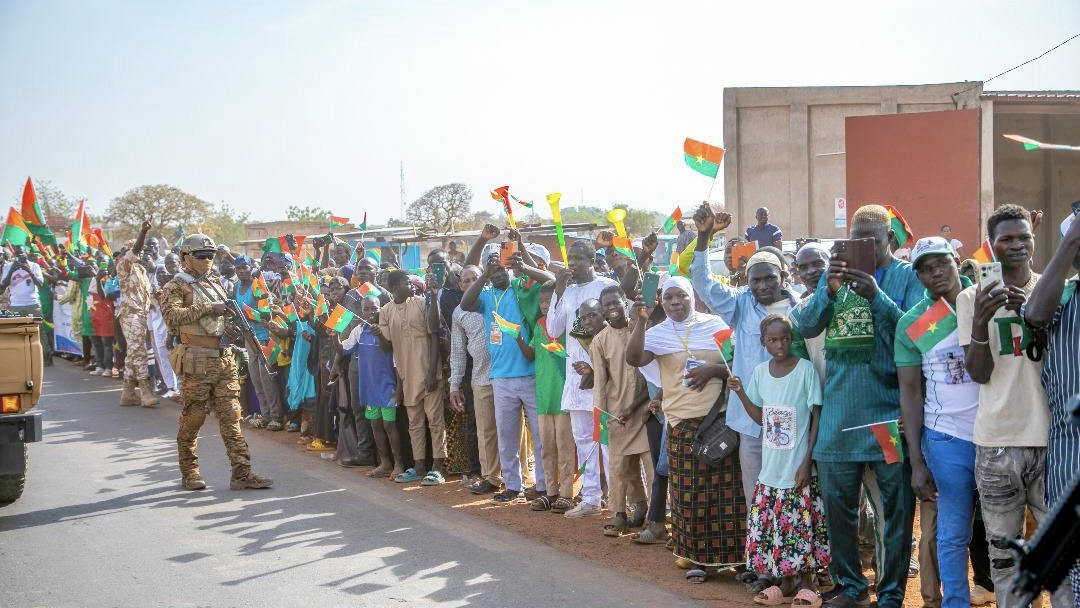
- Supporters greet Ibrahim Traoré
- Date: MPSR's first coup and Traoré's rise to power in the MPSR: 24 January 2022 – 30 September 2022 Ibrahim Traoré in power: 30 September 2022 – present (4 years, 1 month and 1 day) Official Declaration of the Popular Progressive Revolution (RPP): 1 April 2025 – present (1 year, 6 months and 25 days)
- Location: Burkina Faso
- Cause: Discontent with the two-party system; Government corruption; Extreme poverty and wealth inequality; Anger at the previous government's failure to quell the Jihadist insurgency in Burkina Faso
- Motive: Restoration of the Legacy of Thomas Sankara; Prevention of Jihadist takeover; Expansion of state control of key industries, including Gold and Oil; Pan-Africanism; Sankarism; Economic nationalism
- Outcome: Expansion of the Volunteers for the Defense of the Homeland; Nationalization of foreign owned Gold Mines; Perceived achievement of food self-sufficiency in controlled territories; Massive infrastructure works, construction of highways; Improvement of relations with Russia and China; Creation of the Faso Mêbo Agency; Dissolution of all NGO's operating in the country; Dissolution of all political parties in Burkina Faso

The Popular Progressive Revolution (RPP) is a social and political revolution in Burkina Faso that was proclaimed by Burkinabe President Ibrahim Traoré on 1 April 2025, the current leader of the Patriotic Movement for Safeguard and Restoration (MPSR), the ruling military junta of Burkina Faso. The Popular Progressive Revolution is named after the Democratic and Popular revolution, a name given to the Revolution and social upheaval of the Sankarist era by Thomas Sankara. According to Traoré and supporters, the Popular Progressive Revolution seeks to build a Pan-African coalition to combat what its supporters call French Neo-Colonialism and Imperialism. It places emphasis on connecting with the Sankara era of Burkina Faso. Its main ideological futures are nationalism and a state-led economy.

== Policies ==
Traoré's policies include nationalization, social welfare programs and opposition to liberalization reforms.

=== Justice ===
Traoré also announced that the perpetrators of the killing of Thomas Sankara would be put on trial. The former dictator of Burkina Faso, Blaise Compaore and 13 other members of the 1987 Coup were sentenced to life in prison in absentia by a military tribunal.

=== Industrialization ===
A key goal of the revolution is industrialisation and development. Under Traore, Burkina Faso became the first former French Colony to produce Tomato Concentrate. Additionally, Burkina Faso nationalized large swaths of agricultural land, with the eventual goal of total state takeover.

The government also launched large public works programs, leading to constructions of roads, nearly doubling the total amount of roads in Burkina Faso.

The Burkinabe Government further stated a goal of Food self-sufficiency, and started agricultural programs and subsidies to work towards food sovereignty by the end of 2025

Thomas Sankara's body was re-interned in a newly constructed mausoleum in a ceremony overseen by Traoré

In May 2025, the leaders of Burkinabe ministry of sports and his counterparts from Mali and Niger announced the formation of three youth groups, the Federation of Students of the AES, the Coordination of Student Communicators of the AES and the National Coordination of Student and School Monitoring. The goal they stated was to "be direct channels for youth engagement and revolutionary thinking."

In June 2025, the Burkinabe government launched an anti desertification program to encourage tree-planting campaigns.

The Burkinabe Government also launched an anti Malaria Campaign by distributing mosquito nets.

=== Social and Political ===
In 2024 and 2025, the Burkinabe State media began reporting on the establishment and activities of local citizen based council, known as Wayiyan, and also called differing names from city to city, such as Monitoring and Development Committees and even the old Sankara-era name “Committees for the Defense of the revolution.” State media described the councils as “Organs of patriotic communication” and necessary “revolutionary” aspects of the new system. Burkinabe media also described the country as existing in a “revolutionary state.”

Traore’s government also launched a large program of labor reforms according to the Burkinabe media.

In January 2026, Ibrahim Traore announced a blanket ban and forced dissolution of political parties. Assets of parties were confiscated.

On February 27, 2026, The government released the "Burkina on the Move/burkina en marche" website, a digital showcase of certain achievements that the Popular Progressive Revolution (RPP) has accomplished so far

On March 9, 2026 Traore launched his 64 billion-dollar Five-Year plan titled RELANCE 2026-2030 (or Recovery plan 2026-2030), two-thirds of the 64 billion will be raised domestically from the revenues generated by state-owned enterprises and through citizen shareholding programs. The plan is one of the largest economic programs ever proposed in the Sahel. The government has structured the plan around four strategic pillars to be achieved in five years, Minister of Economy and Finance Aboubakar Nacanabo has them listed as:

1) Reduction of the poverty rate from 42% to 35%

2) Increase in life expectancy from 61 to 68 years

3) Increase in electricity generation capacity from 685 MW to more than 2,500 MW

4) Retaking control over the whole territory of the country from jihadist insurgents
