= Burkina Faso–Russia relations =

- Burkina Faso: Russia

Burkina Faso–Russia relations (Russian: Российско-буркинийские отношения) are the bilateral relations between the two countries, Burkina Faso and Russia. Russia is accredited to Burkina Faso from its embassy in Abidjan (Côte d'Ivoire). In July 2023, the embassy of Russia re-opened after being closed since 1992.

== Early years ==
Diplomatic relations between Burkina Faso and the Soviet Union were established for the first time on February 18, 1967. After the breakup of the Soviet Union, Burkina Faso recognized Russia as the USSR's successor. However financial reasons has shut the embassies between the two nations. In 1992, the embassy of the Russian Federation in Ouagadougou was closed, and in 1996, the embassy of Burkina Faso in Moscow was closed. Burkina Faso has since re-opened its embassy in Moscow.

== Early 21st century ==
In 2000, between Russia and Burkina Faso signed an intergovernmental agreement on visa-free travel for diplomatic and service passports. Trade and economic relations are limited to occasional business contacts between business structures. The turnover in 2008 amounted to 3.2 million dollars (mostly Russian exports). Higher education in Russia received about 3,500 students from Burkina Faso. In the 2008/2009 academic year, Burkina Faso has been allocated two scholarships for education in Russian universities at the expense of the federal budget, but which were not used.

On July 26, 2007, Burkina Faso's ambassador to Moscow, Xavier Niodogo, handed a copy of credentials to the Deputy Minister of Foreign Affairs of the Russian Federation, Alexander V. During the meeting discussed a number of international, including African problems, as well as the development of the bilateral relations between the two nations. Niodogo praised the approach of Russia to assist African countries, especially in alleviating their debt burden, tackling the problems of socio-economic development of our country's role in resolving conflicts on the African continent.

== Modern relations ==
In September 2022, a coup in Burkina Faso removed President Paul-Henri Sandaogo Damiba (who had also come to power in a coup a few months earlier) and installed Captain Ibrahim Traoré as the country's new leader. Traoré is suspected of being related to the Russian mercenary organization Wagner Group. People who demonstrated in favor of the coup did so with Russian flags and were accused by the Government of Ghana of hiring Wagner mercenaries to fight the country's jihadist insurgency. Traoré denied those accusations while at the same time ending the country's military collaboration with France.

On December 28, 2023, Russia reopened its embassy in Burkina Faso, which it had closed in 1992, continuing a rapprochement with Burkina Faso.

On September 28, 2024, Russia and Burkina Faso signed an agreement on non-use of weapons in space.

== See also ==
- Foreign relations of Burkina Faso
- Foreign relations of Russia
