= List of international presidential trips made by Ibrahim Traoré =

Ibrahim Traoré has made 6 public international trips to 5 countries as the President of Burkina Faso since taking office on 30 September 2022.

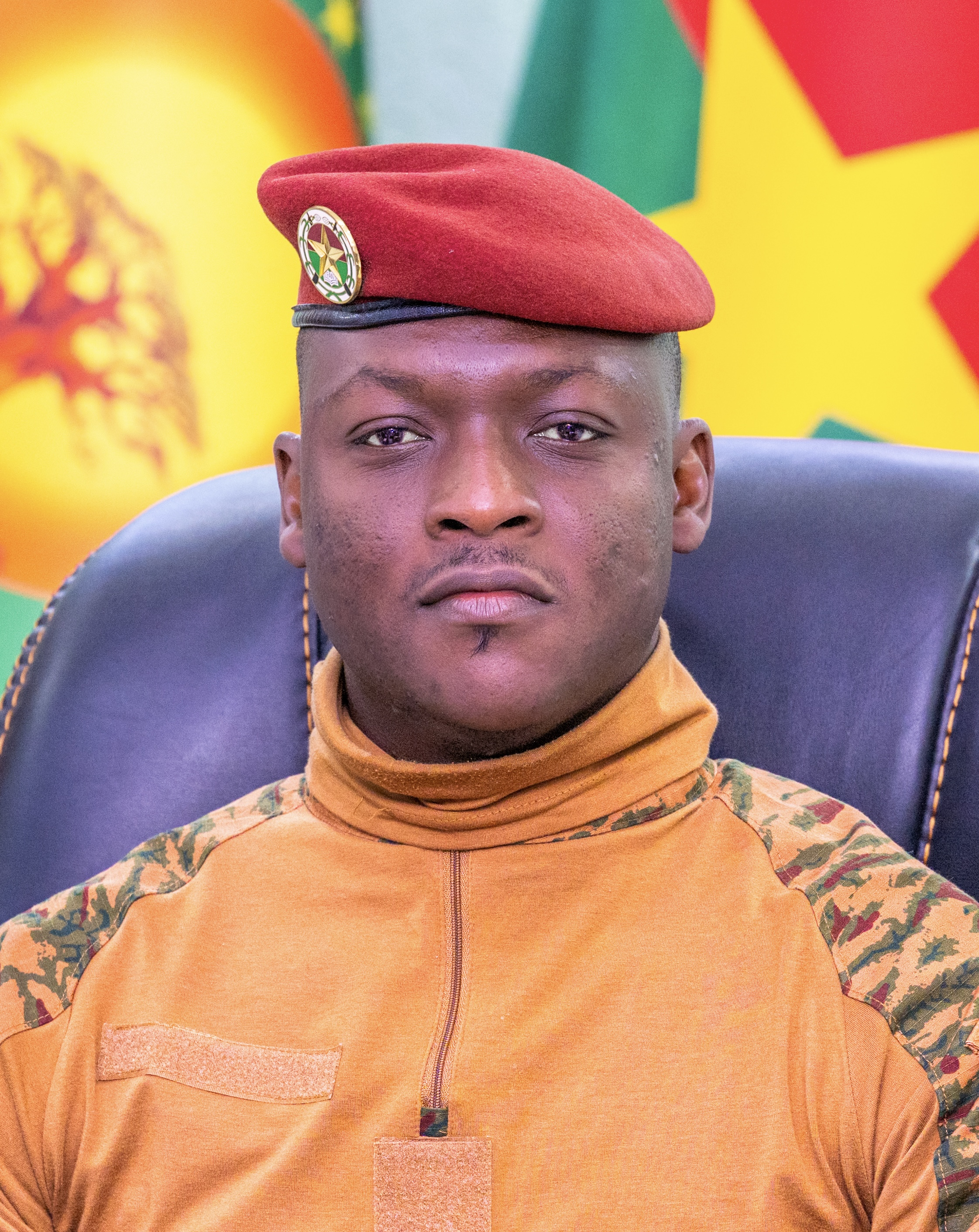
Ibrahim Traoré in 2026

== Summary ==
The number of visits per country where Ibrahim Traoré traveled are:

One visit: Ghana, Mali, Niger and Saudi Arabia.

Two visits: Russia.

== 2022 ==
	Country	Areas visited	Dates	Details
1	Mali	Bamako	2–4 November	Met with President Assimi Goïta.

== 2023 ==
	Country	Areas visited	Dates	Details
2	Russia	Saint Petersburg	26–28 July	Met with President Vladimir Putin and attended the 2nd Russia–Africa Summit.
3	Saudi Arabia	Riyadh	9–11 November	Met with Crown Prince Mohammed bin Salman and attended the Saudi–Africa Summit.

== 2024 ==
	Country	Areas visited	Dates	Details
4	Niger	Niamey	5–6 July	Met with President Abdourahamane Tiani and Malian President Assimi Goïta and attended the inaugural summit of the Alliance of Sahel States.

== 2025 ==
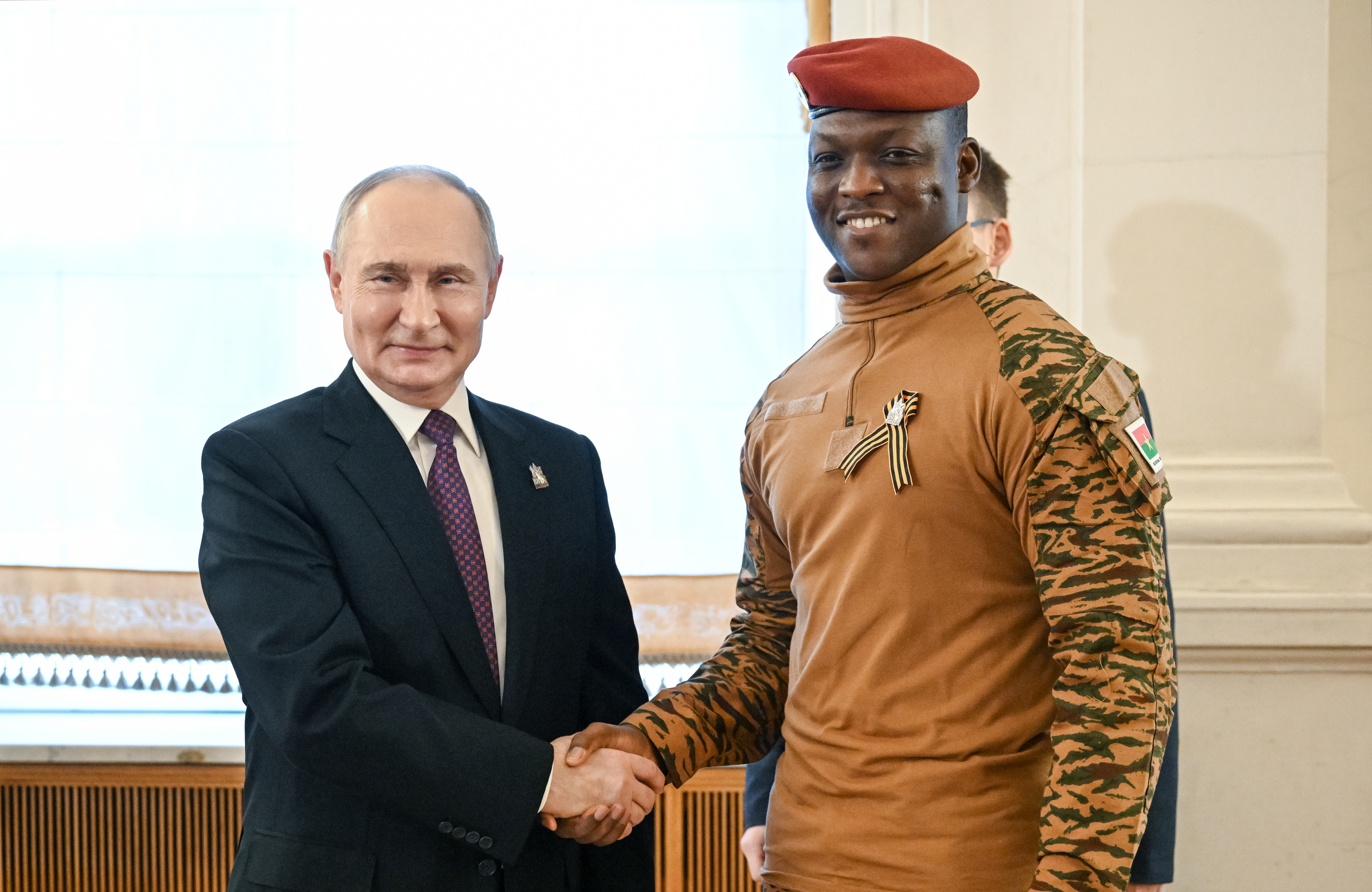
Traoré with Russian President Vladimir Putin in Moscow, Russia – 8 May 2025

	Country	Areas visited	Dates	Details
5	Ghana	Accra	7–8 January	Attended the inauguration ceremony of President John Mahama.
6	Russia	Moscow	8–11 May	Met with President Vladimir Putin and attended the 80th Moscow Victory Day Parade.
