= Senate (Burkina Faso) =

Senate le Sénat

Type
- Type: Upper house

The Senate (French: le Sénat, lit. 'the Senate') is the uncreated upper chamber of Burkina Faso. Though Burkina Faso is currently running under a unicameral legislative system since the dissolution of the Chamber of Representatives, which had served as the upper house of Burkina Faso's former bicameral legislatures in 2002, plans were made to restore the upper house under the name of 'Senate' in the June 2012 constitutional amendments.

This revision was never executed due to an extended and unresolved political confrontation over the Senate's establishment, which left the country effectively with a unicameral legislature as of 2026.

== Constitutional framework ==
Under the amended constitution, the parliament of Burkina Faso theoretically consists of two chambers, the directly elected National Assembly and the Senate; only the National Assembly currently exists in practice. The Senate would have been composed of representatives of the local governmental divisions, customary and religious authorities, employers, workers, and citizens living abroad, with the addition of persons appointed by the president of Burkina Faso. Only those senators representing the local governments would have been elected (via indirect elections by the elected local governments). The interest group senators would have been chosen by their respective organizations. All potential senators would have had to be at least 40 years old to seek or be appointed to the office. Senatorial terms would have lasted for six years (one year longer than deputies in the Assembly).

Had the Senate been created as required under the constitution, both chambers would have the power to initiate and vote on proposals of laws, except budgetary laws that would have originated in the lower house.

== October 2014 Constitutional Crisis Role ==
On 30 October 2014, as part of the 2014 Burkinabè uprising, protesters stormed the parliament building and set fire to it in response to the proposal to amend the Constitution of Burkina Faso to abolish term limits, which would have effectively paved the way for President Blaise Compaoré to remain in office for another five-year term. A day later, President Compaoré resigned from office.

Under the constitution's Article 43, after the unfulfilled 2012 amendments, if the national presidency becomes vacant, the president of the Senate should become acting president, with some temporary and partial powers of the office, until a presidential election is held within 60–90 days. However, since the Senate was never created before the resignation of President Blaise Compaoré, there is no person fitting this description. This added to the constitutional crisis by leaving nobody constitutionally able to fill the vacancy as acting president. Prior to the 2012 amendments, the president of the National Assembly would have become acting president.

== See also ==
- National Assembly of Burkina Faso
- History of Burkina Faso
- Politics of Burkina Faso
- List of legislatures by country
- Legislative Branch
