= Politics of Burkina Faso =

According to the 1991 Constitution of Burkina Faso, the politics of Burkina Faso take place in the form of a semi-presidential republic, with powers separated between the executive, legislative, and judicial branches. The President of Burkina Faso, who has historically established the majority of Burkinabé policy, is the head of state. Also under the executive branch is a prime minister and a cabinet, the Council of Ministers. The president-appointed Prime Minister of Burkina Faso is the head of government under a multi-party system.

The legislative branch includes a unicameral parliament, the National Assembly, which passes laws and monitors government actions. The judicial branch includes at its base Tribunals of First Instance, then Courts of Appeal, and at the top the Supreme Court with four chambers—constitutional, administrative, judicial, and financial. This branch is the weakest and least-independent in Burkina Faso because of inadequate human, budgetary, and logistical resources in addition to the president, as the President of the High Council of the Magistracy, having power over key appointments.

Throughout Burkina Faso's history, the military has played an integral role in politics, and the country is currently under Ibrahim Traoré, a military captain. The Burkinabé government has experienced 11 successful military coups d'état because of weak civilian institutions, insecurity, and widespread frustration with ineffective governance. After coups and during transition periods, the Constitution is largely ignored, giving unchecked authority to the head of state. After an internal coup ousted Paul-Henri Sandaogo Damiba, the previous military head of state, a new transitional charter was adopted that named Traoré the transitional president. The coup was primarily orchestrated because Damiba ineffectively handled rising jihadist influence and attacks, which have killed thousands and displaced more than two million.

== Burkina Faso under Ibrahim Traoré ==
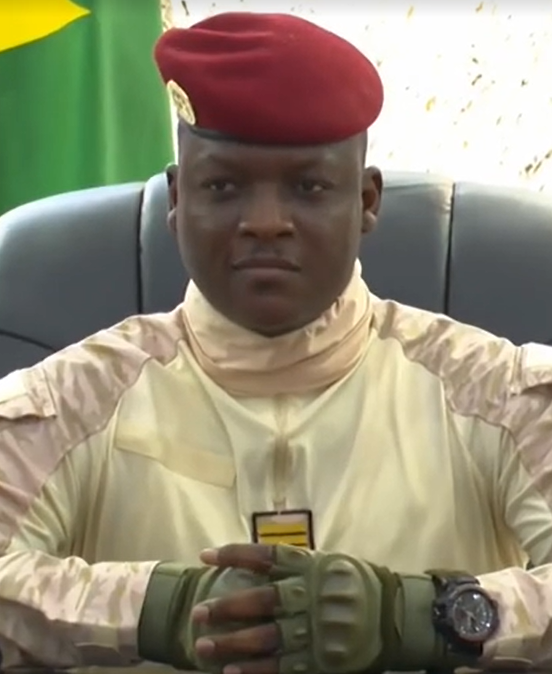
Interim president Ibrahim Traoré, a military captain, has led the military junta governing Burkina Faso since September 2022.

As the leader of the Patriotic Movement for Safeguard and Restoration (MPSR), Ibrahim Traoré has proven himself to be a controversial yet serious leader. He has been the interim president of Burkina Faso since September 2022. Similar to previous military leaders, Traoré has maintained popular support by utilizing nationalist rhetoric and by growing Burkina Faso's economy; the country's GDP has grown from $18.8 billion to $22.1 billion under him. Traoré has made steps toward curbing jihadist intrusion by significantly increasing the membership of the Volunteers for the Defense of the Homeland (VDP) by nearly 100,000 members.

Traoré is a strong verbal opponent of neocolonialism and Western domination and has sought economic self-sufficiency in Burkina Faso, prioritizing agricultural and industrial reforms. He has shifted Burkinabé foreign policy. The country no longer receives economic and military support from former colonizer France, who previously sent large amounts of foreign aid and maintained a large military presence in Burkina Faso. Instead, Traoré has furthered an alliance with Russia.

Ibrahim Traoré has received much criticism internationally and from some Burkinabé, largely because of his disregard for the democratic principles outlined in Burkina Faso's Constitution. When Traoré became the interim president in September 2022 following the coup of Paul-Henri Sandaogo Damiba, a transition phase was in effect. In July 2024, elections were supposed to be held to form a civilian government, but Traoré announced that his government would extend the transition by 60 months.

Traoré has suppressed speech by media organizations, trade unions, and civil society groups. This has primarily been done to individuals and groups critical of his military rule and coups in the Sahel as well as those critical of the Burkinabé army and its abuses against civilians. Burkinabé media organizations—like Radio Oméga, Burkina Faso's most important independent radio station—that have platformed these individuals and groups have faced temporary suspensions. Individuals strongly opposed to Traoré have been abducted and conscripted to the state security forces and the VDP. Despite Traoré not upholding Burkina Faso's Constitution, he is popular among Burkinabé, especially from youth and nationalists.

== Post-colonial political history ==
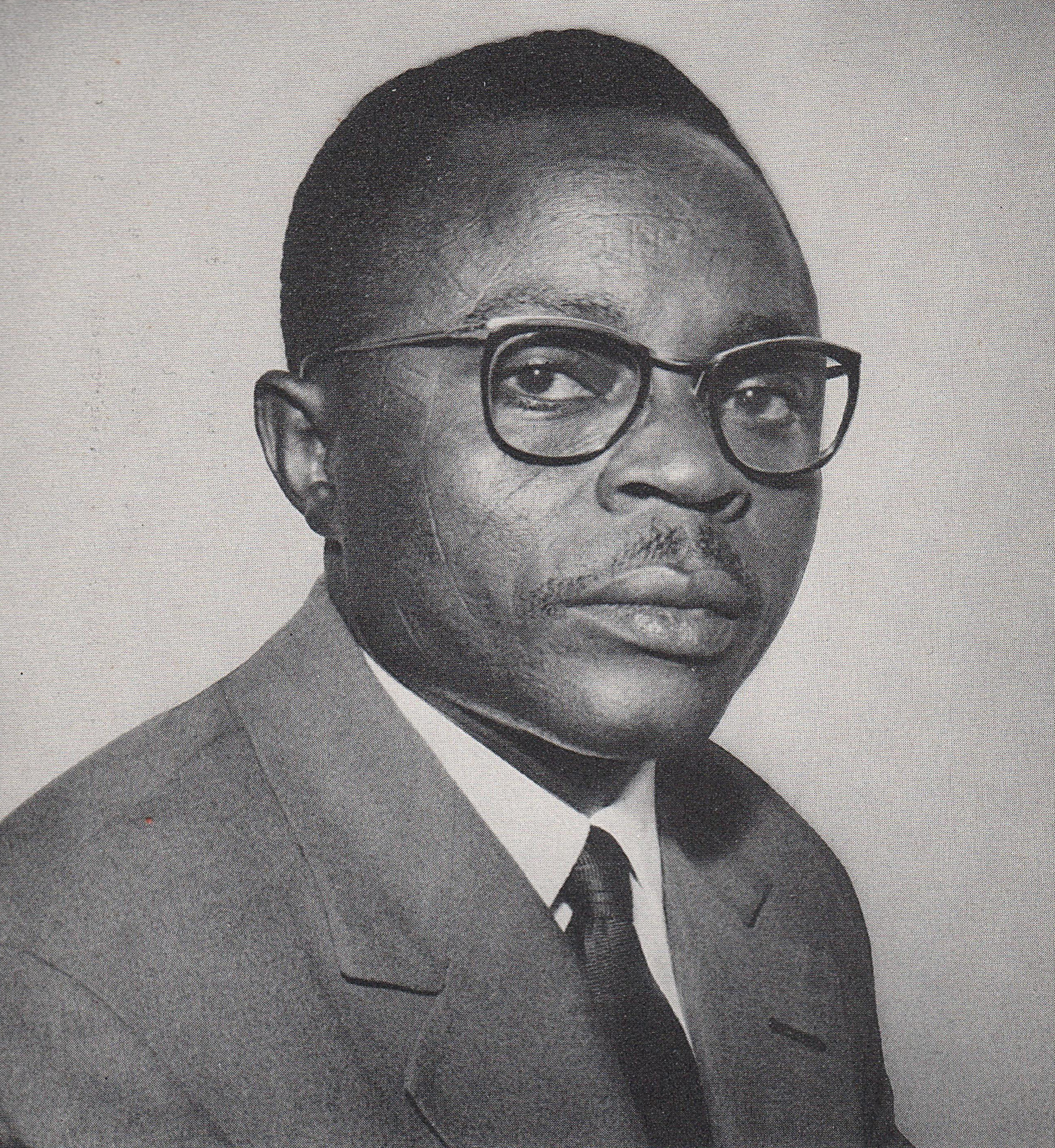
President Maurice Yaméogo was the first president of Burkina Faso, then Upper Volta, following independence from France. He was ousted in a coup by Colonel Sangoulé Lamizana in 1966.

Burkina Faso (then Upper Volta) became formally independent from French rule in 1960. Maurice Yaméogo, who was elected president in December 1959, presided over Burkina Faso's newly independent government. The country was under a unitary constitution, with power centralized in the national government. Despite Yaméogo being an anti-colonial leader, he did not make significant strides towards alleviating the political, social, and economic legacies of colonialism.

Minimal modifications were made to the state structures that remained from the colonial state. Yaméogo attempted to make Burkina Faso a one-party state under the Voltatic Democratic Union-African Democratic Rally (UDV-RDA), which is what caused his eventual fall from power. After years of austerity and nepotistic political appointments, civilians wanted Yaméogo to be replaced.

While strength in opposition to Yaméogo grew, so did the Burkinabé military: the end to French occupation brought increasing national autonomy, which included military autonomy. The military positioned itself as a neutral force in the midst of political unrest. The army grew as an autonomous unit after Yaméogo rejected French support for it, in turn causing the army to develop as a nationally oriented institution.

Many members of the army were veterans of colonial wars who experienced repression under French rule. By 1966, when protests erupted over austerity and repression, the army, and especially Lieutenant-Colonel Sangoulé Lamizana, refused to suppress demonstrations and supported civilian opposition to Yaméogo. Lamizana arrested Yaméogo in a coup d'état, declaring himself the head of state in 1966 with widespread support from Burkinabé.

Sangoulé Lamizana was the first of many coup leaders in Burkina Faso to successfully gain power. Because Yaméogo was despised throughout Burkina Faso, Lamizana made the military popular. He played an integral role in establishing military culture in Burkina Faso by promoting it as a stabilizing and unifying force. Lamizana suspended the constitution and dissolved the National Assembly, eventually replacing the constitution and attempting to shift to civilian rule in 1970.

A civilian government was elected, but after a power struggle ensued between Speaker of the Parliament Joseph Ouédraogo and Prime Minister Gérard Kango Ouédraogo, Lamizana re-established military rule. Throughout Lamizana's rule, he would temporarily allow limited political activity but eventually suppress this activity when he deemed it to be getting out of hand. His most prominent opponents were French-educated left-wing intellectuals and trade union organizers, but his eventual demise came as a result of another military coup.

As a response to the Lamizana government's continued failure to deal with strikes and food shortages, Saye Zerbo, who was a trained military leader, mounted a coup in 1980 that overthrew Lamizana. Zerbo eradicated the constitution enacted by Lamizana and instead ruled through a thirty-one-member Military Committee for Recovering National Progress (CMRPN). The military committee included future presidents Thomas Sankara and Blaise Compaoré, showing how the political leadership of Burkina Faso has historically been influenced by military connections. Similar to previous Burkinabé heads of state, Zerbo's administration was corrupt and did not provide social improvements for the people of Burkina Faso. Zerbo was accused of embezzling £28 million (well over US$100 million in current inflation-adjusted value) from government funds.

A coup orchestrated by the Conseil de Salut du People (CSP), led by Colonel Gabriel Yoryan Somé, overthrew the Saye Zerbo regime and appointed Surgeon Major Jean Baptiste Ouédraogo the head of state. Ouédraogo later appointed Thomas Sankara prime minister in January 1983. Mere months later, in May 1983, President Ouédraogo removed pro-Libyan and anti-French elements from the Burkinabé government and disbanded the CSP. This greatly upset radicals in Burkina Faso, leading to his regime to be overthrown in August by the National Council for the Revolution (CNR). He was replaced by his former prime minister, Thomas Sankara.

Thomas Sankara's revolutionary ideas were widely popular in the years leading up to his rule, especially among students and the military. It was under Sankara that the country's name changed from "Upper Volta" to "Burkina Faso," meaning "land of the proud and honest people." Largely beginning in 1975, Sankara and other officers, including future president and then close ally of Sankara's Blaise Compaoré, stayed in close contact with leftist civilians. Sankara, Compaoré, and other important revolutionary figures in Burkinabé politics secretly attended meetings of leftist coalitions, notably including the African Independence Party (PAI), Union of Communist Struggles (ULC), and Voltaic Revolutionary Communist Party.

They appealed to the public, attending these meetings in civilian clothes. A network of revolutionary organizing laid the foundation for the 1983 coup of Ouédraogo. Sankara emphasized breaking from neo-colonial dependencies, especially from France, and rooting out corruption that had plagued the Burkinabé government since its independence. He and the CNR created and orchestrated Revolutionary Popular Tribunals (TPRs), which were broadcast and convicted over 100 members of previous regimes of corruption. In addition, the Sankara government implemented environmental restoration initiatives and catalyzed popular support from Burkina Faso's 95% rural population by investing in widespread small development initiatives.

Even though there was much initial enthusiasm surrounding Thomas Sankara's presidency, positive sentiments eventually faded after his government participated in political repression. This repression largely came from members of the CNR and not Sankara himself. While many of the CNR's initiatives found support from the Burkinabé people, some resentment and outright resistance was expressed. CNR officials responded to this with coercion and excessive repression.

Political repression under his government was also exhibited through the way his Committees for the Defense of the Revolution (CDRs) operated. While they initially played a large role in mobilizing revolutionary sentiment before and after Sankara was elected, the actions of many CDRs were corrupt and spread violence. Many repeated abuses were carried out by CDR militants, who were often armed. While unmasking corrupt state functionaries, they participated in corruption themselves by embezzling funds and breaking into homes to collect what they called "taxes" and "contributions."

However, Sankara did press CDRs to operate in a just and respectable manner and tried leveling out corruption within his own government. This created friction within governmental leadership, especially with Blaise Compaoré. Sankara refused to combine existing Marxist groups into a single ruling party out of fear of creating an elitist government, which was viewed as weak by Compaoré and allies. This set the stage for the 1987 coup in which Sankara was assassinated and former ally Compaoré was appointed president.

In 1990, the Popular Front held its first National Congress, which formed a committee to draft a national constitution. The constitution was approved by referendum in 1991. In 1992, Blaise Compaoré was elected president, running unopposed after the opposition boycotted the election because of Compaoré's refusal to accede to demands of the opposition such as a Sovereign National Conference to set modalities. The opposition did participate in the following year's legislative elections, in which the ODP/MT won a majority of the seats contested for. The government of the Fourth Republic includes a strong presidency, a prime minister, a Council of Ministers presided over by the president, a National Assembly, and the judiciary. The legislature and judiciary are independent but remain susceptible to outside influence.

In 1995, Burkina held its first multiparty municipal elections since it gained independence. The president's ODP/MT won over 1,100 of some 1,700 councilor seats being contested. In February 1996, the ruling ODP/MT merged with several small opposition parties to form the Congress for Democracy and Progress (CDP). This effectively co-opted much of what little viable opposition to Compaoré existed. The remaining opposition parties regrouped in preparation for 1997 legislative elections and the 1998 presidential election. The 1997 legislative elections, which international observers pronounced to be substantially free, fair, and transparent, resulted in a large CDP majority—101 to 111 seats.

In January 2022 a coup d'état took place, and the military announced on television that Kaboré had been deposed from his position as president. After the announcement, the military declared that the parliament, government, and constitution had been dissolved. On 31 January, the military junta restored the constitution and appointed Paul-Henri Sandaogo Damiba as interim president. A few months later, On 30 September 2022, Damiba was himself ousted by Ibrahim Traoré, his military colleague. President Damiba resigned and left the country. On 6 October 2022, Captain Ibrahim Traore was officially appointed as president of Burkina Faso.

== Government ==
=== Executive branch ===
Main office-holders
Office	Name	Party	Since
President	Ibrahim Traoré	Military	30 September 2022
Prime Minister	Apollinaire Joachim Kyélem de Tambèla	None	21 October 2022

The president is elected by popular vote for a five-year term and may serve up to two terms. The prime minister is appointed by the president with the consent of the legislature. The constitution of 2 June 1991, established a semi-presidential government with a parliament (French: Assemblée) which can be dissolved by the President of the Republic, who is elected for a term of 5 years.

The year 2000 saw a constitutional amendment reducing the presidential term from seven to five years, which was enforced during the 2005 elections. Another change according to the amendment would have prevented sitting president Blaise Compaoré from being re-elected. However, notwithstanding a challenge by other presidential candidates, in October 2005, the constitutional council ruled that because Compaoré was already a sitting president in 2000, the amendment would not apply to him until the end of his second term in office, thereby clearing the way for his candidacy in the 2005 election. On 13 November Compaoré was reelected in a landslide due to a divided political opposition.

In 2010, Compaoré was once again re-elected, and the term limit requirement was held to not apply to him. A proposed constitutional amendment in 2014 would have permitted him to run again, but public resistance led to the 2014 Burkinabé uprising, and Compaoré resigned on 31 October 2014. A transitional government headed by President Michel Kafando and Prime Minister Isaac Zida took power for a one-year mandate. Elections were to have been held in October 2015, but members of the Regiment of Presidential Security launched a coup on 16 September 2015, detaining President Kafando and Prime Minister Zida. RSP commander Gilbert Diendéré named himself the head of the new military junta, but popular resistance, backed by army and gendarmerie forces not aligned with the RSP, forced his resignation and the restoration of the transitional government a week later.

==== Council of Ministers ====
The Burkinabé Council of Ministers nominated on 5 March 2022 included prime minister Albert Ouédraogo and 25 ministers.

=== Legislative branch ===
According to the constitution, the Parliament votes on the law, consents to taxation, and controls the actions of the government under provisions of the constitution. The Parliament, which is made up of the National Assembly and Senate, meets each year in two ordinary sessions, each of which may not exceed ninety days. The first session opens on the first Wednesday of March and the second the last Wednesday of September. If either of these days lands on a holiday, the session opens the next first working day. Each chamber of Parliament meets in extraordinary session on request of the President, demand of the Prime Minister, or of an absolute majority of half of the Deputies or Senators on a specific agenda and closes at the completion of said agenda.

The National Assembly (Assemblée Nationale) has 111 members, named Deputies, and are elected for a five-year term by proportional representation.

The Senate, as described in the Constitution of Burkina Faso, would consist of representatives from local government divisions, customary and religious authorities, workers, employers, Burkinabé abroad and people appointed by the President of Burkina Faso and serve a term of six years. The constitution requires that anyone elected or appointed must be 45 years old by the day of the ballot.

In May 2013, then-President Compaoré announced the establishment of a new Senate with 89 members, 29 of which would be selected by the president themselves, and the rest appointed by local officials. With Senate elections being held in July 2013, government opposition groups warned against a legislative body with a majority of handpicked sympathizers by the president. Compaoré was successful in appointing 1/3rd of the Senate, prompting protesters rallying in the streets of Bobo-Dioulasso and the capital Ouagadougou to protest the establishment of the Senate, which has since been postponed.

The Presidents of both the Senate and National Assembly are elected for the duration of the legislator by an absolute majority of half the chamber in the first round of voting, or a simple majority in the second round. Their functions can be terminated during the course of a legislature at the demand of two-fifths and a vote of the absolute majority of the members of the Assembly. In the case of vacancy of the presidency of either chamber of Parliament by death, resignation, or other reason, said chamber elects a new president by the same method. Each chamber has financial autonomy, with the President of the said chamber managing the credits allocated to them for the functioning of the chamber, but with a vote of the absolute majority, the chamber can dismiss the President for incompetence in managing finances.

Unless discovered in flagrante delicto, any member of Parliament can only be prosecuted or arrested in a penal or criminal matter with the authorization of at least one-third members of the chamber which they reside.

== Political parties and elections ==
- 2020 Burkinabé general election

== Political pressure groups ==
Burkinabé General Confederation of Labor (CGTB); Burkinabé Movement for Human Rights (HBDHP); Group of 14 February; National Confederation of Burkinabé Workers (CNTB); National Organization of Free Unions (ONSL); watchdog/political action groups throughout the country in both organizations and communities

== Administrative divisions ==
Burkina Faso is divided into 13 regions and 45 provinces:

Regions:

- Boucle du Mouhoun, Cascades, Centre, Centre-Est, Centre-Nord, Centre-Ouest, Centre-Sud, Est, Hauts-Bassins, Nord, Plateau-Central, Sahel, Sud-Ouest

Provinces:

- Balé, Bam, Banwa, Bazega, Bougouriba, Boulgou, Boulkiemde, Comoé, Ganzourgou, Gnagna, Gourma, Houet, Ioba, Kadiogo, Kenedougou, Komondjari, Kompienga, Kossi, Koulpelogo, Kouritenga, Kourweogo, Leraba, Loroum, Mouhoun, Namentenga, Nahouri, Nayala, Noumbiel, Oubritenga, Oudalan, Passore, Poni, Sanguie, Sanmatenga, Séno, Sissili, Soum, Sourou, Tapoa, Tuy, Yagha, Yatenga, Ziro, Zondoma, Zoundweogo

== International organization participation ==
ACCT, ACP, AfDB, AU, ECA, ECOWAS, (Note: Membership suspended after the 2022 coup d'état) Entente, FAO, G-77, IAEA, IBRD, ICAO, ICC, ITUC, ICRM, IDA, IDB, IFAD, IFC, IFRCS, ILO, IMF, Intelsat, Interpol, IOC, ITU, NAM, OAU, OIC, OPCW, PCA, UN, UNCTAD, UNESCO, UNIDO, UPU, WADB, WADB (regional), WAEMU, WCO, WFTU, WHO, WIPO, WMO, WTOO, WTrO.

== International relationships ==
The ambassador of Burkina Faso to Canada is Juliette Bonkoungou.

The ambassador of Burkina Faso to Mexico is Jonathan Hodgson.

The former ambassador of Burkina Faso to the United States was Tertius Zongo, he left his post when appointed Prime Minister in July 2007; the US Ambassador to Burkina Faso is Andrew Robert Young.

== See also ==
- 2019 Burkina Faso government resignation
