= Georges Namoano Military Academy =

Burkina Faso armed forces traning school

The Georges Namoano Military Academy (French: Académie militaire Georges Namoano), commonly abbreviated AMGN, is an officer training school in Burkina Faso supporting the Burkina Faso Armed Forces. The school was established by presidential decree by President Thomas Sankara on October 18, 1984. The academy was initially called the Pô Military Academy (AMP). It was renamed the Georges Namoano Military Academy on August 23, 1985, in honor of officer cadet Georges Namoano, who died during a mission. It trains Burkinabè officers and officers from other countries in the West African sub-region, to include cadets from Benin, Cameroon, the Central African Republic, Congo-Brazzaville, Djibouti, Guinea, Mali, Senegal, Chad, and Togo. The training lasts for a period of two years and results in cadets commissioning into the armed forces as an all-arms officer.

== Alumni ==
- Ibrahim Traoré, interim president of Burkina Faso since 2022.
- Paul-Henri Sandaogo Damiba, interim president of Burkina Faso from January to September 2022.
