= Kourakou and Tondobi attacks =

2023 massacres in Burkina Faso

- Part of the jihadist insurgency in Burkina Faso
- Location: Kourakou and Tondobi, Séno Province, Burkina Faso
- Date: April 6–7, 2023
- Deaths: Total: 44; Kourakou: 31; Tondobi: 13
- Injuries: Unknown
- Perpetrator: Islamic State - Sahil Province

In early April 2023, jihadists from the Islamic State – Sahil Province (ISGS) killed at least 44 civilians in the towns of Kourakou and Tondobi in Séno Province, Sahel Region, Burkina Faso.

== Background ==
Since 2015, northern Burkina Faso has been embroiled in a jihadist insurgency that has spread from the neighboring country of Mali. The attacks have been conducted by jihadists linked to al-Qaeda and the Islamic State. According to estimates from NGOs, the campaign by these jihadists has resulted in the deaths of over 10,000 civilians, soldiers, and police, as well as the displacement of at least 2,000,000 people. According to official data, jihadist organisations are thought to govern 40% of the country.

Séno Province, in Sahel Region, has been at the forefront of many attacks. The deadliest attack occurred in June 2022 in the village of Seytenga, where over 100 civilians were killed. Another deadly attack occurred in February 2023, when at least 25 civilians, including three police officers, were killed in an attack by unknown jihadists. Kourakou and Tondobi are not far from Seytenga.

Captain Ibrahim Traoré overthrew the government in a coup in September 2022. Burkina Faso's new military head pledged to intensify a "dynamic offensive" against the jihadists. The region's lieutenant-governor gave assurances that efforts were being made to calm the region.

== Attacks ==
The attacks in Kourakou and Tondobi were reprisal killings that were retaliation for villagers in the towns lynching two jihadists who had been stealing cattle. A resident of Kourakou speaking to AFP stated that gunfire rang "all night long", and that villagers were unable to safely view the ensuing carnage until the following morning. Thirty-one civilians were killed in Kourakou, and 13 were killed in Tondobi. Both civilians and lieutenant-governor Rodolphe Sorgho said that there were scores of injured, but the number was unknown.

== Aftermath ==
Rodolphe Sorgho, lieutenant-governor of the Sahel region, claimed that the perpetrators were "put out of action" following the "despicable terrorist attack." Burkinabe forces launched operations to find the perpetrators after the attack.

The International Crisis Group stated that the attacks were perpetrated by the Islamic State – Sahil Province.

== See also ==
- List of terrorist incidents in 2023
