= Cabinet of Burkina Faso =

Government of Burkina Faso

The Cabinet of Burkina Faso is the most senior level of the executive branch of the Government of Burkina Faso. It is made up of the prime minister and department ministers.

== Members of the current cabinet (Cabinet of Jean Emmanuel Ouédraogo) ==
Apollinaire Joachim Kyélem de Tambèla was appointed interim prime minister by interim president Ibrahim Traoré on October 21, 2022. Before being replaced by Jean Emmanuel Ouédraogo on December 7, 2024 during a reshuffle. The cabinet later reshuffled on January 12, 2026 "in accordance with the vision of the Popular Progressive Revolution (RPP)". with many posts merged and cabinet names changed, lowering the number of ministers.

=== Current cabinet of Jean Emmanuel Ouédraogo ===
Ministers are appointed by the president of Burkina Faso.

Post	Deputy minister	Term
Prime Minister of Burkina Faso	Jean Emmanuel Ouédraogo	7 December 2024 - present
Minister of State, Minister of War and Patriotic Defense	General Célestin Simpore	8 December 2024 – present
Minister of State, Minister of Agriculture, Water, Animal and Fisheries Resources	Commander Ismaël Sombie	12 January 2026 – present
Minister of State, Minister of Territorial Administration and Mobility	Mr.Emile Zerbo	7 December 2024 – present
Minister of Economy and Finance	Mr.Aboubakar Nacanabo	7 December 2024 – present
Minister of Security	Divisional Police Commissioner Mahamadou Sana	7 December 2024 – present
Minister of Foreign Affairs	Mr. Karamoko Jean-Marie Traoré	7 December 2024 – present
Minister of the Servants of the People	Mr. Mathias Traore	7 December 2024 – present
Minister of Communication, Culture, Arts and Tourism, Government Spokesperson	Mr.Pingdwendé Gilbert Ouedraogo	7 December 2024 – present
Minister of Family and Solidarity	Commander Passowendé Pélagie Kabre/Kabore	7 December 2024 – present
Minister of Justice	Mr. Edasso Rodrigue Bayala	7 December 2024 – present
Minister of Health	Mr. Robert Lucien Jean-Claude Kargoudou	7 December 2024 - present
Minister of Digital Transition, Posts and Electronic Communications	Mrs. Aminata Zerbo /Sabane	7 December 2024 – present
Minister of Industry, Trade and Handicrafts	Mr. Serge Gnaniodem Poda	7 December 2024 – present
Minister of Homeland Construction	Mr. Mikaïlou Sidibe	12 January 2026 – present
Minister of Energy, Mines and Quarries	Mr. Yacouba Zabré Gouba	7 December 2024 – present
Minister of Basic Education, Literacy and the Promotion of National Languages	Mr. Jacques Sosthène Dingara	7 December 2024 – present
Minister of Secondary Education and Vocational and Technical Training	Mr. Moumouni Zoungrana	12 January 2026 – present
Minister of Higher Education, Research and Innovation	Mr. Adjima Thiombiano	7 December 2024 – present
Minister of Sports, Youth and Employment	Mrs. Annick Lydie Djouma Pikbougoum /Zingue Ouattara	12 January 2026 – present
Minister Delegate to the Minister of State, Minister of Agriculture, Water, Animal and Fisheries Resources, responsible for Animal Resources:	Mr. Amadou Dicko	7 December 2024 – present
Minister Delegate to the Minister of the Economy and Finance, in charge of the Budget	Madame Fatoumata Bako/Traore	7 December 2024 – present
Minister Delegate to the Minister of Foreign Affairs	Mrs. Bebgnasgnan Stella Eldine Kabre/Kabore	7 December 2024 – present
Minister Secretary General of the Government and the Council of Ministers	Mr. Ousmane Ouattara	7 December 2024 – present
Minister Chief of Staff	Captain Martha Celeste Anderson Medah	7 December 2024 – present
Aide-de-camp of the Prime Minister	Clement Kabre	7 December 2024 – present
Chief of Security of the Prime Minister	Bob Landry Kabore	7 December 2024 – present
Physician to the Prime Minister	Narcisse Oubda	7 December 2024 – present
Minister of Territorial Administration, Decentralization and Security	Emile Zerbo	12 January 2026 – present
Minister of Health and Public Hygiene	Robert Lucien Jean-Claude Kargougou	12 January 2026 – present
Minister of Justice	Théophile Sawadogo	12 January 2026 – present
