= Abdoulaye Soma =

Burkinabé lawyer and politician

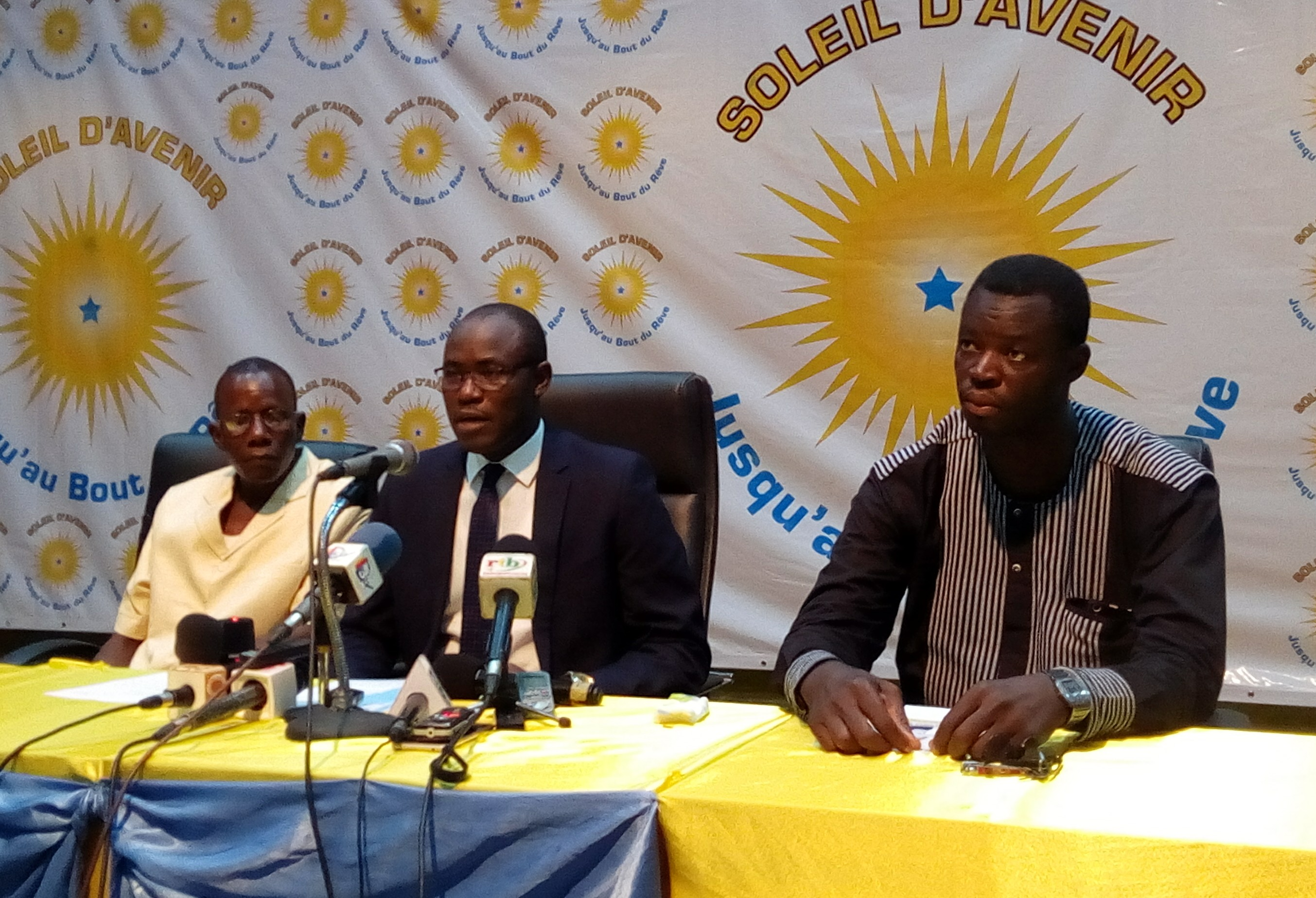
- Soma (center) in 2019
- Born: May 6, 1979 (age 47); Banfora, Burkina Faso

Abdoulaye Soma (born May 6, 1979) is a Burkinabé lawyer and politician.

== Biography ==
Soma was born May 6, 1979 in Banfora. Between December 2014 and January 2016, he served as Special Advisor to the Prime Minister of the Burkinabe Transitional Government.

In April 2022, he became the 4th Vice-President of the Legislative Assembly of the Transition (ALT), which constitutes the National Assembly under the Burkinabè Transition following the coup d'état by Paul Henri Sandaogo Damiba on January 24, 2022.
