= Yolande Viviane Compaoré =

Burkinabe politician (died 2026)

Member of the National Assembly of Burkina Faso
- In office ???–???

Governor of Nord Region
- In office ???–???

Minister of Transport and Tourism of Burkina Faso
- In office 1990s
- President: Blaise Compaoré

Minister of Regional Integration of Burkina Faso
- In office 1990s
- President: Blaise Compaoré

Personal details
- Died: 10 January 2026 Ouagadougou, Burkina Faso
- Party: CDP

Yolande Viviane Compaoré (died 10 January 2026) was a Burkinabe politician. A member of the Congress for Democracy and Progress, she served in the National Assembly of Burkina Faso, and as governor of Nord Region.

During the administration of President Blaise Compaoré, she served as Minister of Transport and Tourism of Burkina Faso and as Minister of Regional Integration of Burkina Faso in the late 1990s.

Compaoré died on 10 January 2026. She was found murdered inside her residence in Ouagadougou following a possible assault.
