= 2022 Namsiguia bombing =

Terrorist attack

- Part of Islamist insurgency in Burkina Faso
- Location: Namssiguia, Bam Province, Burkina Faso
- Date: August 9, 2022
- Deaths: 15 soldiers
- Injuries: 1+
- Perpetrator: JNIM or ISGS (alleged by Burkina Faso)

On August 9, 2022, two bombings in Namssiguia, Bam Province, Burkina Faso killed 15 Burkinabe soldiers and injured an unknown number of others.

== Background ==
Throughout the early 2010s, jihadist movements spread widely throughout the Sahel, and reached Burkina Faso in 2015. Since then, the Burkinabe government has struggled to hold back both the Islamist insurgents and the tribal warfare and violence, which has escalated since the war's outbreak. In early 2022, the Burkinabe military under Paul-Henri Damiba overthrew President Roch Kaboré, citing the latter's inability to control the violence as a reason for the coup. However, jihadist attacks continued in Burkina Faso throughout 2022.

== Bombing ==
Prior to the bombing, jihadists had raided a nearby village and killed five civilians and five militiamen. While Burkinabe soldiers were driving in the region, one truck hit a roadside IED, killing several troops. A second explosion went off after another convoy of soldiers arrived on the scene to help the wounded, killing them too.
