= Supreme Court of Burkina Faso =

The Supreme Court of Burkina Faso is Burkina Faso's Supreme court. It exercises original jurisdiction over serious matters in Benin of which a lower court (or, a magistrate's court) does not have the proper authority to operate and/or act on.

== See also ==
- Politics of Burkina Faso
