= Joseph Sirima Bissiri =

Burkinabé politician (1953 –2025)

Joseph Sirima Bissiri (January 14, 1953 – December 7, 2025) was a Burkinabé politician.

== Life and career ==
Bissiri was born in Niangoloko on January 14, 1953. After his secondary education, he pursued higher education in economics and finance in Nice, France, before returning to Burkina Faso in 1983.

Bissiri began his career in the service of the Burkinabe State, as director of forecasting at the Ministry of Economy and Finance, in the fields of economic planning and policies. From 2006 to 2014, he was appointed national coordinator of the Millennium Challenge Account (MCA-Burkina Faso), a U.S. program that finances road infrastructure projects.

He became involved in politics within the People's Movement for Progress (MPP) from the creation of the party. He was a major political figure of the MPP in the Cascades region, in Banfora, Niangoloko and in the province of Comoé, he was elected as a member of the National Assembly of Burkina Faso, and sat in the Pan-African Parliament as the representative of Burkina Faso.

In the early 2020s, Bissiri became a special advisor to the President of Burkina Faso, Roch Marc Christian Kaboré.

== Death ==
Bissiri died on December 7, 2025, at the age of 72.
