= Boulsa Department =

Coordinates: 12°39′N 0°34′W

- Department
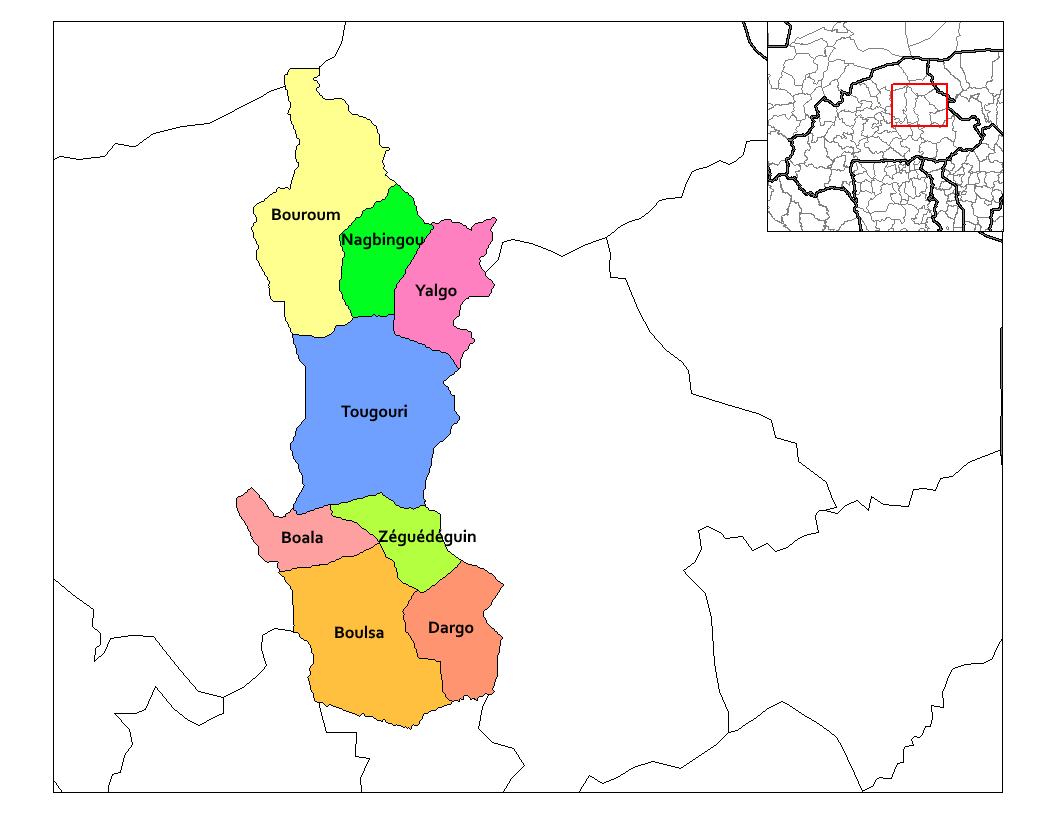
- Boulsa Department location in the province
- Country: Burkina Faso
- Region: Centre-Nord Region
- Province: Namentenga Province

Area
  - Department: 449 sq mi (1,162 km^{2})

Population (2019 census)
  - Department: 113,392
  - Density: 252.7/sq mi (97.58/km^{2})
  - Urban: 24,197
- Time zone: UTC+0 (GMT 0)

The Boulsa Department is a department or commune of Namentenga Province in northern Burkina Faso. Its capital is the town of Boulsa.

== Towns and villages ==
- Boulsa (capital)
