= Safiatou Lopez =

Burkinabé businesswoman and activist (1976–2025)

Safiatou Lopez-Fafié Zongo (8 January 1976 – 14 September 2025) was a Burkinabé businesswoman and political activist.

== Life and career ==
Born Safiatou Zongo, 8 January 1976, in Ouagadougou, she was the daughter of Mahamadi Zongo and Minata Ouedraogo. Initially, she invested herself in economics and business; in fact, after working for a number of companies, she made her own, Afrique Construction SA, in March 2004, of which she became CEO, despite being in a country where entrepreneurs are rarely women. Her company specialised in building, civil engineering and public works.

When then-President Blaise Compaoré, who had been in power for more than 25 years, attempted to modify the constitutional law that limited presidential terms in 2014, the country was rife with dissent. Unsurprisingly, therefore, Zongo joined the movement leading the dissent and helped campaign; in particular, she engaged with the Association pour la promotion de la démocratie et participation citoyenne (Association for the Promotion of Democracy and Citizen Participation), which she became president of, and was highly influential in the 2014 Burkinabé uprising. After 2014, she continued her activism. Namely, by participating in the coordination of Civil Society Organisations and by becoming deputy spokesperson in charge of drafting the charter of transition. From the beginning of 2015, she began worrying about the position of the Regiment of Presidential Security within the Burkinabé armed forces, and fought against the failed coup d'état of September 2015, where the regiment played a key role. She supported Roch Marc Christian Kaboré in the presidential election, and Kaboré became president in November 2015.

In the following years, she remained attentive to maintenance of public liberties. In June 2018, her presence was noticed among speakers of a protest against a presidential action. At 21:30, 29 August 2018, while home with her children, she was arrested by the anti-terrorism department of the Burkinabé police force for reasons that remain unrevealed. The arrest provoked a certain public stirring.

Lopez died in Accra, Ghana on 14 September 2025, at the age of 49.
