= Kosyam Palace =

Official residence of the president of Burkina Faso

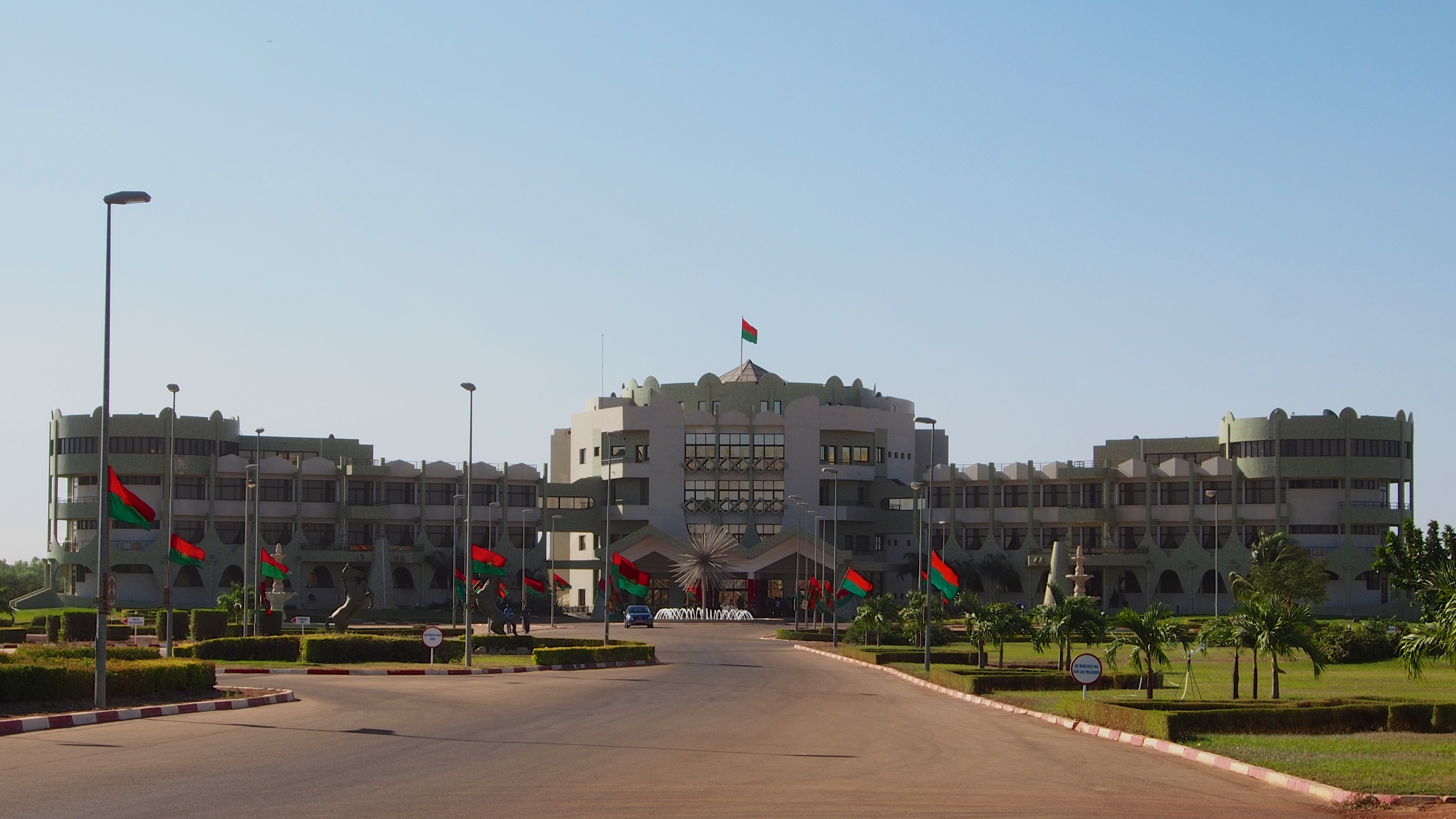
The Kosyam Palace in 2013.

The Kosyam Palace is the official residence of the president of Burkina Faso. It is located in Ouaga 2000, an upper-middle-class neighborhood in southeastern Ouagadougou. It was dedicated in 2005.

The architect behind its construction is Michel I. Tshibuabua. He was a Congolese pan-Africanist architect that have established many structures on the continent, especially in Gabon where he started his career under President Omar Bongo
