= Constitution of Burkina Faso =

Supreme law of Burkina Faso

The Constitution of Burkina Faso was approved by referendum on 2 June 1991, formally adopted 11 June 1991, and last amended in January 2002. The last amendment abolished the upper chamber of the parliament, the Chamber of Representatives.

In 2015, President Kaboré promised to revise the 1991 constitution. The revision was completed in 2018. One condition prevents any individual from serving as president for more than ten years either consecutively or intermittently and provides a method for impeaching a president. A referendum on the constitution for the Fifth Republic was erroneously announced for 24 March 2019 but has not actually been officially scheduled.

Certain rights are also enshrined in the revision: access to drinking water, decent housing, and recognition of the right to civil disobedience, for example. The referendum was required because the opposition parties in Parliament refused to sanction the revised wording.

On 24 January 2022, following a coup d'état, the military announced on television that Kaboré had been deposed from his position as president. After the announcement, the military declared that the parliament, government and constitution had been dissolved. On 31 January, the military junta restored the constitution and appointed Paul-Henri Sandaogo Damiba as interim president. Following the September 2022 coup d'état, captain Ibrahim Traoré suspended the Constitution.

In December 2023, a new draft revision of the constitution is adopted by the government, relegating French as a working language and abolishing the High Court of Justice, which judges political figures. In October 2024, the transitional Parliament authorizes an amendment to the Constitution. Before being submitted to the Constitutional Council, and then, its promulgation by President Ibrahim Traoré. On 21 November 2024, president Ibrahim Traoré promulgated the law, carrying the draft constitutional revision, for the entry into force of the new revised constitution, as of 30 November 2024.
