= Paul-Henri Sandaogo Damiba =

Burkinabé military officer and president in 2022

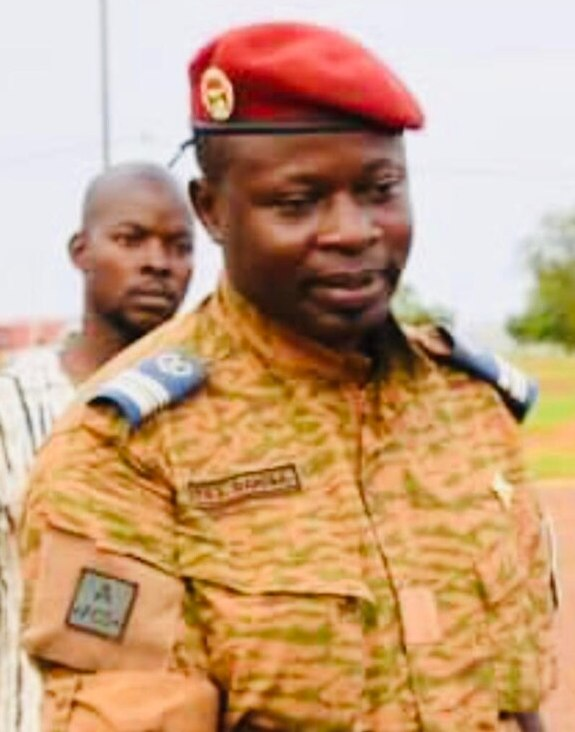
- Damiba in 2022

Interim President of Burkina Faso
- In office 31 January 2022 – 30 September 2022
- Prime Minister: Albert Ouédraogo
- Preceded by: Roch Marc Christian Kaboré
- Succeeded by: Ibrahim Traoré

President of the Patriotic Movement for Safeguard and Restoration
- In office 24 January 2022 – 30 September 2022
- Deputy: Sidsoré Kader Ouédraogo
- Succeeded by: Ibrahim Traoré

Minister of National Defence and Veterans
- In office 12 September 2022 – 30 September 2022
- Prime Minister: Albert Ouédraogo
- Preceded by: Aimé Barthélemy Simporé
- Succeeded by: Kassoum Coulibaly

Personal details
- Born: January 1981 (age 45) Ouagadougou, Upper Volta (now Burkina Faso)
- Education: École militaire Conservatoire national des arts et métiers

Military service
- Allegiance: Burkina Faso
- Branch/service: Burkina Faso Army
- Years of service: 2003–2022
- Rank: Lieutenant colonel
- Unit: RSP (until 2011)
- Battles/wars: Islamist insurgency in Burkina Faso; January 2022 Burkina Faso coup d'état September 2022 Burkina Faso coup d'état

Paul-Henri Sandaogo Damiba (French: [pɔl ɑ̃ʁi sɑ̃daɔɡɔ damiba]; born January 1981) is a Burkinabé military officer who served as interim president of Burkina Faso from 31 January 2022 to 30 September 2022, when he was removed in a coup d'état by his own military colleague, Ibrahim Traoré. Damiba had come to power just eight months earlier, on 24 January 2022, when he removed president Roch Marc Christian Kaboré in a coup.

== Early life and education ==
Paul-Henri Sandaogo Damiba graduated from the École militaire in Paris. During his studies, he met with future Guinean president Mamady Doumbouya, who was also training there. He holds a master's degree in criminology from the Conservatoire national des arts et métiers (CNAM) in Paris and a defense expert certification in management, command and strategy. From 2010 to 2020, he held training exercises in the United States.

== Military career ==
Damiba is a lieutenant colonel and commander of the third military region covering Ouagadougou, Manga, Koudougou and Fada N'gourma. He is a former member the Regiment of Presidential Security, the former presidential guard of Blaise Compaoré. Damiba left the RSP in 2011 after an army mutiny.

In 2019, Damiba testified in the trial of conspirators behind a 2015 coup in Burkina Faso that briefly deposed a transitional government, according to reports from the time in Burkinabe media.

Damiba has gained popularity for his actions during the Jihadist insurgency in Burkina Faso. He called in the past for the Burkinabé government to recruit mercenaries from the Russian Wagner Group against Islamist rebels. The government of Roch Marc Kaboré was strictly opposed to the proposal, on the grounds that doing so would alienate Burkina Faso from the West.

In late 2021, an army of jihadists overran the base of a gendarmerie in Inata, Soum, killing 49 gendarmes and four civilians. A significant uproar rose in response to the attack, spurred on by revelations about the poor treatment of the gendarmes by the government prior to the raid, forcing numerous government officials to resign or have their ministries shuffled. According to online African-American reference center BlackPast.org "It later came to light that the gendarmes at Inata had not received food rations for two weeks... [they] were forced to slaughter animals in the vicinity to stay alive." Kaboré appointed Damiba, who by then was deeply moved by the events at Inata, as the head of an "anti-terrorist operations" ministry that would seek security for Eastern Burkina Faso and Ouagadougou.

In 2021, Damiba published a book about the fight against Islamists, West African Armies and Terrorism: Uncertain Responses?

Damiba has received training through a number of United States programs. In 2010 and 2020, he participated in the Flintlock Joint Combined Exchange Training exercises including raising awareness of human rights and laws of armed conflicts. In 2013, Damiba participated in the U.S. State Department funded African Contingency Operations Training and Assistance course. In 2013 and 2014, Damiba attended the Military Intelligence Basic Officer Course for Africa. In 2018 and 2019, he trained in Burkina Faso with a U.S. Defense Department Civil Military Support Element.

== Taking power, rule, and downfall ==
On 24 January 2022, Damiba led a coup deposing and detaining President Roch Marc Christian Kaboré and Prime Minister Lassina Zerbo. While people were celebrating the coup in Ouagadougou, some supporters carried Russian flags, as a sign of their call to receive help from Russia in their fight against Islamist terrorism. After the announcement, the military declared that the National Assembly and the Government had been dissolved, while the Constitution had been suspended. On 31 January, the military junta restored the Constitution and appointed Damiba as the interim president.

With Damiba at its head, the Patriotic Movement for Safeguard and Restoration military junta pledged to improve security and eventually restore civilian rule. However, the military regime failed to defeat the Jihadists; instead, rebels and other non-state actors even expanded their operations and controlled 40% of the country by September 2022. Many military officers grew dissatisfied with Damiba, believing that he did not focus on the rebellion. Jihadist insurgents launched several major attacks in September 2022, causing the interim president to reshuffle his cabinet. On 12 September, Damiba fired his defense minister, General Aimé Barthélemy Simporé, and assumed the position himself. He also appointed Colonel-Major Silas Keita as minister delegate in charge of national defence. These changes did not satisfy the disgruntled army elements.

On 30 September 2022, Damiba was ousted by the dissatisfied army elements headed by Captain Ibrahim Traoré. This came eight months after he had taken power. Sahel expert and University of Calgary scholar Abdul Zanya Salifu argued that his inability to defeat the jihadists had led to Damiba's downfall, as his promise to improve security had been the justification for him taking power in the first place.

The whereabouts of Damiba after the coup initially remained unknown. The new junta under the leadership of Traoré later accused Damiba of trying to flee towards the French military base of Camp Kamboinsin in order to mount a counter-coup. Damiba however rejected the charge and Traore later stated that he did not think France was involved. France denied any involvement in the September 2022 coup.

Religious and community leaders announced on 2 October that Damiba had agreed to resign from his position after they mediated between him and Traoré. Damiba demanded seven guarantees in return, including that his allies would be protected, a guarantee for his security and rights, and that the new junta would fulfill the promise he made to the Economic Community of West African States (ECOWAS) about restoring civilian rule in two years. Traoré agreed to the deal and Damiba went into exile in Togo. Three army officers were arrested in November 2022 for helping him flee from Burkina Faso.

In July 2024, Damiba sent a letter to Ibrahim Traoré, President of Burkina Faso, in which he expressed concern about the deterioration of the security situation and possible abuses against civilians. In September, Damiba was accused by Traoré's military junta of organizing (along with military officers, former ministers and others) a plot to overthrow the junta that was foiled. He was also accused of involvement in the August Barsalogho massacre, carried out by Jama'at Nasr al-Islam wal-Muslimin. In January 2026, he was arrested, tried and extradited to Burkina Faso over the accusations against him.

== Public image ==
The January 2022 coup was widely popular in Burkina Faso. Damiba has become known for the red beret he wears during speeches, believed to be an impression of Burkinabé revolutionary and founding father Thomas Sankara, whose speeches also carried similar rhetoric to Damiba's. Damiba had already gained praise prior to the coup for his activities fighting jihadists.

When Damiba proved unable to contain the insurgency, public support for him declined sharply. When he was overthrown in September 2022, groups in the capital gathered to express support for those who had deposed him.

Political offices
Preceded by Roch Marc Christian Kaboré as President of Burkina Faso	President of the Patriotic Movement for Safeguard and Restoration; January–September 2022	Succeeded by Ibrahim Traoré
Preceded by Roch Marc Christian Kaboré as President of Burkina Faso	Interim President of Burkina Faso; January–September 2022	Succeeded by Ibrahim Traoré
