= September 2022 Burkina Faso coup d'état =

- Part of the Coup Belt
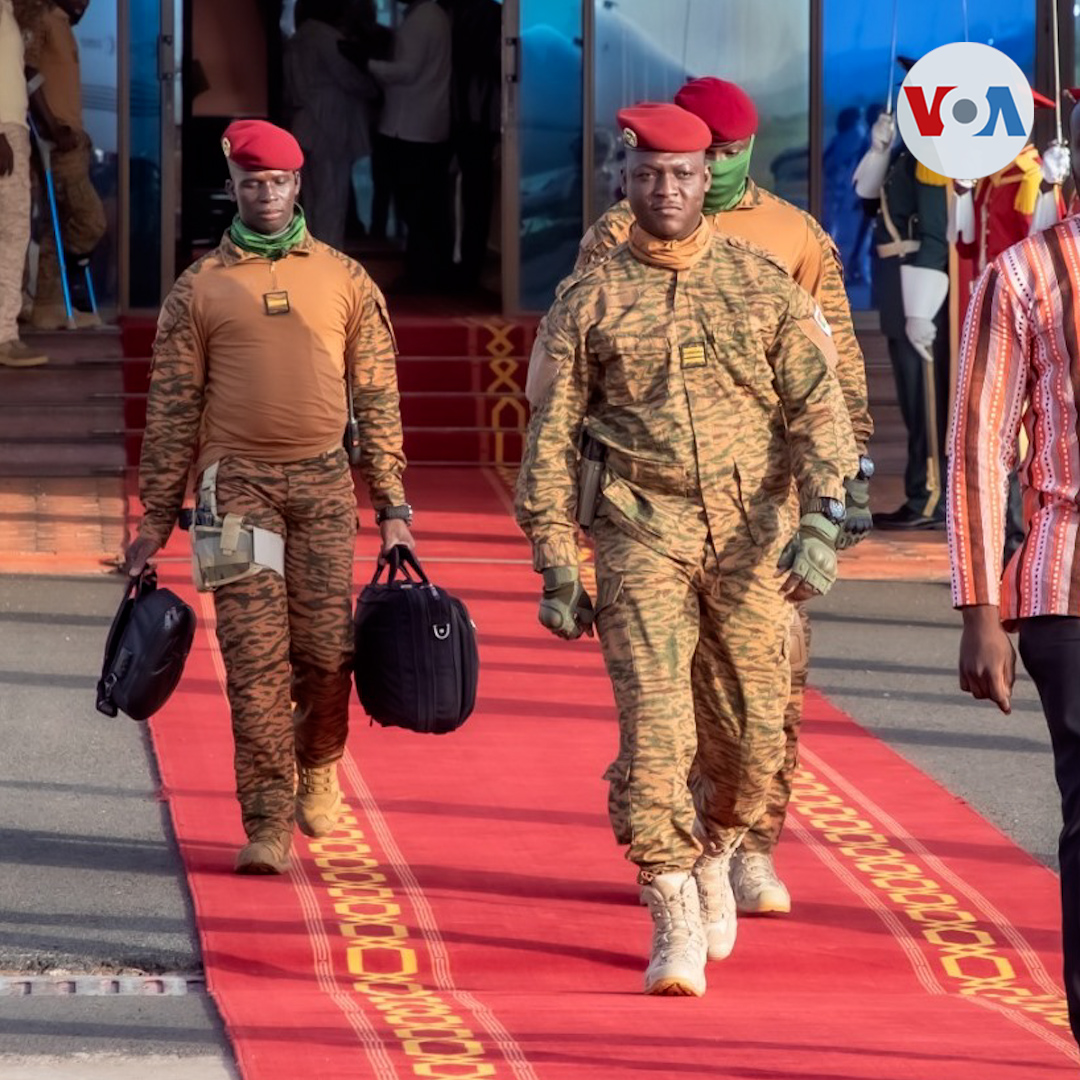
- Ibrahim Traoré (seen here) deposed Paul-Henri Sandaogo Damiba
Date	30 September 2022
Location	Ouagadougou, Burkina Faso
Result	Interim President Paul-Henri Sandaogo Damiba deposed and resigns; Dissolution of the parliament and government

Belligerents
Government of Burkina Faso	Burkina Faso Armed Forces dissidents

Commanders and leaders
Paul-Henri Sandaogo Damiba	Ibrahim Traoré

Units involved
BAF loyalists	"Cobra" special forces

A coup d'état took place in Burkina Faso on 30 September 2022, removing Interim President Paul-Henri Sandaogo Damiba over his alleged inability to deal with the country's Islamist insurgency. Damiba had come to power in a coup d'état eight months earlier. Captain Ibrahim Traoré took over as interim leader.

== Background ==
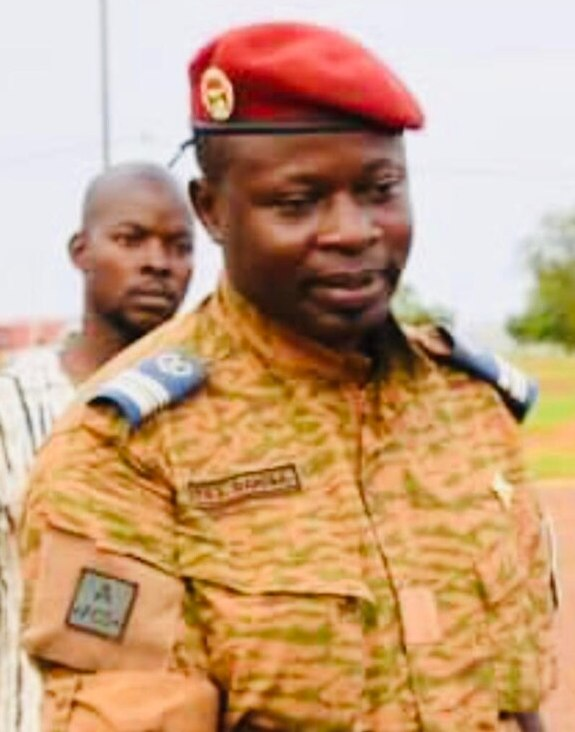
Paul-Henri Sandaogo Damiba, Interim President January 2022 – September 2022

The coup came in the aftermath of the January 2022 Burkina Faso coup d'état. The January coup had been motivated by the Burkinabe government's inability to contain the jihadist insurgency in Burkina Faso. A group of army officers overthrew President Roch Marc Christian Kaboré, installing the Patriotic Movement for Safeguard and Restoration, a military junta, with Paul-Henri Sandaogo Damiba as its head. The coup was initially welcomed by many in Burkina Faso, as the previous government had become deeply unpopular due to its failure to deal with the insurgency.

However, the new regime was also unable to defeat the rebels, and instead lost even more territory to Jihadists and other militants. By September 2022, nearly 40 per cent of Burkina Faso was controlled by non-state forces. Meanwhile, Damiba fired his defence minister and assumed the position himself. Several of the officers who had supported the January coup became dissatisfied with Damiba's rule, later claiming that he had not focused enough on defeating the insurgents and instead pursued his own goals. These disgruntled officers were mainly young and served directly at the frontlines. Public support for Damiba also declined.

The dissatisfied elements, led by Captain Ibrahim Traoré, thus planned their own coup. Traoré was serving as the head of a military unit in Kaya, a town in Burkina Faso's north. The exact unit is disputed; Jeune Afrique stated that he led an artillery regiment, but other sources have claimed that he commanded the "Cobra" special forces based in Kaya. In addition to the military government's poor performance against the rebels, the "Cobra" troops were also upset over delays of their pay and the fact that their former chief commander, Emmanuel Zoungrana–who had been imprisoned under Kaboré's government–had not been freed by Damiba. On 26 September, a supply convoy to the besieged northern town of Djibo was ambushed by rebels, leading to the death of eleven Burkinabe soldiers and the kidnapping of 50 civilians. This event further undermined public confidence in Damiba's government, and possibly contributed to his eventual overthrow.

The coup also came amidst a push by both Russia and Turkey in recent years to increase their influence in the Sahel region. Some of the efforts were led by the Wagner Group whose founder, Yevgeny Prigozhin, was a close ally of Russian President Vladimir Putin up until the Wagner Group rebellion in June of 2023. In recent years, there had also been a growing discontent with France, the main ally of the Sahel countries in the battle against jihadists in the region, including in Burkina Faso. Many in the country preferred replacing France with Russia. Prigozhin has attempted to influence the anti-French sentiment in the Sahel through troll farms. Before the coup, the military was divided over whether to replace France with other international partners, especially Russia. Damiba however had decided against it.

== Coup d'état ==
The coup began early in the morning when heavy gunfire and explosions were heard in several parts of the capital Ouagadougou, including in the Ouaga 2000 neighbourhood that houses both the presidential and military junta headquarters. Masked soldiers organized blockades in the capital's center; the pro-coup troops appeared to mainly belong to the "Cobra" unit. Clashes took place at a military base, Camp Baba Sy, where Damiba was mainly based. Gunfire was also reported at the Kosyam Palace. State TV went off the air. Hours later, the interim government admitted an "internal crisis" within the army and said talks were underway to reach a settlement. On Facebook, Interim President Damiba admitted that there had been a "change in mood among certain elements of the national armed forces". Negotiations between the revolting troops and the government were unsuccessful.

As civilians realised that a coup was taking place, groups gathered in the capital to gather information or demonstrate support for the coup plotters.

In the evening, Captain Traoré announced that he and a group of officers had decided to remove Interim President Damiba due to his inability to deal with a worsening Islamist insurgency in the country. He imposed a curfew from 9:00 pm to 5:00 am, suspended all political and civil society activities, closed all air and land borders, and suspended the Constitution of Burkina Faso. Traoré declared that he was the new head of the Patriotic Movement for Safeguard and Restoration. He also dissolved the government and the transitional legislative assembly.

== Aftermath ==
The whereabouts of Damiba after the coup initially remained unknown. The new junta under the leadership of Traoré later accused Damiba of trying to flee towards the French military base of Camp Kamboinsin in order to mount a counter-coup. Damiba meanwhile rejected the charge. Traoré stated that he did not think that France was supporting a counteroffensive. Burkinabe citizens supporting the coup attacked the French embassy in Ouagadougou and a French cultural institute in Bobo-Dioulasso on the following day. France denied any involvement in the September 2022 coup and condemned the attacks.

Religious and community leaders announced on 2 October that Damiba had agreed to resign from his position after they mediated between him and Traoré. Damiba demanded seven guarantees in return, including that his allies would be protected, a guarantee for his security and rights, and that the new junta would fulfil the promise he made to the Economic Community of West African States (ECOWAS) about restoring civilian rule in the country in two years. Traoré agreed and Damiba announced his resignation in an audio recording, fleeing for exile in Togo with the help of some army officers.

In January 2023, the Patriotic Movement for Safeguard and Restoration military junta told French forces to withdraw from Burkina Faso within a month. The French Army officially ended its operations in the country in February 2023. Later in the same month, the junta withdrew from a military assistance agreement with France dating to 1961. Despite the coup, Burkina Faso started witnessing a resurgence in jihadist attacks in 2023.

== Reactions ==
The reaction of the population remains mixed. Although one part of the population supported and celebrated the new coup d'état, another part does not believe that a new political change can solve the increasing security issues.

The coup was described as "very regrettable" by the president of the country's Movement for Human Rights, who also criticised the military for its divisions and inability to combat extremism.

Asserting that "serious and intolerable incidents" have targeted the embassy and some French companies, the French Minister of Foreign Affairs Catherine Colonna expressed her concerns about French citizens' safety in the country.

The ECOWAS opposed the coup and added that it came at an "inopportune time" when Burkina Faso was returning to a constitutional government. Moussa Faki Mahamat, the chairperson of the African Union Commission, condemned the coup as "unconstitutional" and suspended Burkina Faso from the organization.

The Organisation of Islamic Cooperation (OIC) condemned the coup and called for calmness and upholding the spirit of dialogue. The United States stated that it was "deeply concerned" by the situation and called on the new junta to de-escalate, protect citizens and soldiers, and allow a return to "constitutional order".

Russia called for a return to normalcy as soon as possible in Burkina Faso in order to ensure "complete order" and a "return to the framework of legitimacy".

Prigozhin congratulated Traoré and called him "a truly courageous son of the motherland". In his statement, he credited Damiba for freeing Burkina Faso from what he described as the yoke of the colonialists, though also stated that he "did not justify the confidence of the young officers" and that they "did what was necessary and they did it for the benefit of their people".
