= Patriotic Movement for Safeguard and Restoration =

Military junta governing Burkina Faso since the 2022 coup d'etat

- Mouvement patriotique pour la sauvegarde et la restauration

Overview
- Established: 24 January 2022
- State: Burkina Faso
- Leader: President (Ibrahim Traoré)
- Headquarters: Ouagadougou

The Patriotic Movement for Safeguard and Restoration (MPSR) has been the ruling military junta of Burkina Faso since the January 2022 Burkina Faso coup d'état. Originally it was led by Paul-Henri Sandaogo Damiba, but he was overthrown by dissatisfied junta members during the September 2022 Burkina Faso coup d'état. In his place, Ibrahim Traoré was installed as the leading figure. Aside from Traoré and Sorgho (the group's official spokesperson), other MPSR members are not known to the public. Traoré's government is known as (MPSR2) by state media.

== Identified members ==
- Ibrahim Traoré
- Farouk Azaria Sorgho
- Paul-Henri Sandaogo Damiba (formerly)
