= List of heads of state of Burkina Faso =

President of Burkina Faso
- Président du Burkina Faso
- Presidential Standard

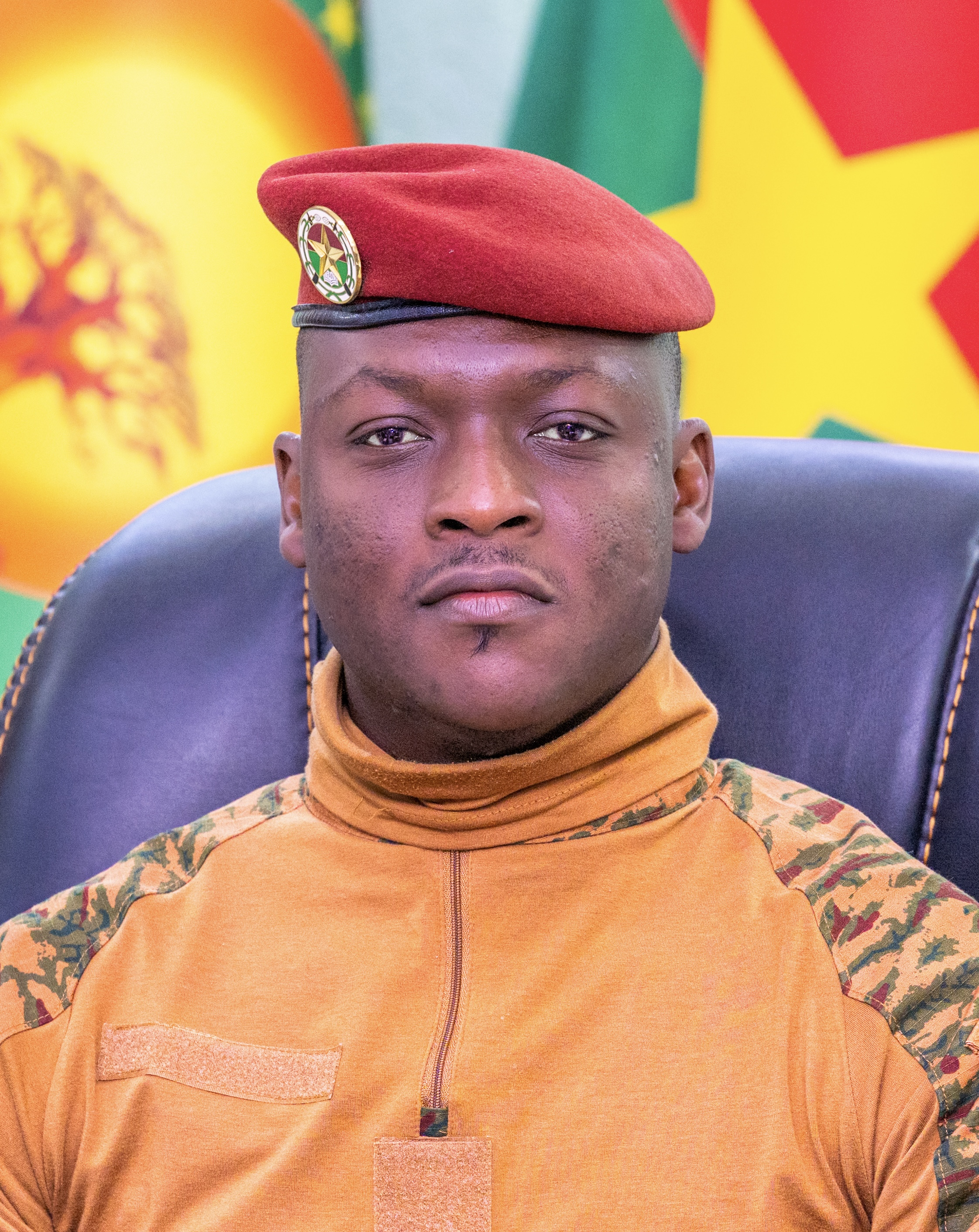
- Incumbent; Ibrahim Traoré (Interim) since 30 September 2022 (Note: As President of the Patriotic Movement for Safeguard and Restoration until October 6, when he was additionally sworn in as Interim President)
- Style: Mr. President (informal); His Excellency (diplomatic)
- Type: Head of state Commander-in-chief As President of the MPSR: De facto leader
- Residence: Kosyam Palace
- Seat: Ouagadougou
- Appointer: Direct popular vote
- Term length: Five years, renewable once
- Constituting instrument: Constitution of Burkina Faso
- Inaugural holder: Maurice Yaméogo (as President of Upper Volta); Thomas Sankara (as President of Burkina Faso)
- Formation: 5 August 1960; 66 years ago (as President of Upper Volta); 4 August 1984; 42 years ago (as President of Burkina Faso)
- Succession: President of the National Assembly
- Salary: CFA 858,399 annually including allowances
- Website: www.presidencedufaso.bf

The president of Burkina Faso (French: Président du Burkina Faso) is the head of state of Burkina Faso as well as the commander-in-chief of the armed forces. It is the highest office in Burkina Faso and has significant executive power, including appointing the prime minister and other government officials. The president also has the power to dissolve parliament and issue decrees.

The office was first established in August 1960 as president of Upper Volta (French: Président du Haute-Volta) after the country gained independence from France. Maurice Yaméogo was the first holder of that office. On 4 August 1984, the day before the 24th anniversary of independence, Thomas Sankara, who was the president from exactly one year earlier, became the president of Burkina Faso after the country changed its name the same day.

A total of seven people have served as president of Upper Volta/Burkina Faso (not counting four transitional heads of state/presidents and one acting president in rebellion).

The current interim president is Capt. Ibrahim Traoré, who took power during a coup d'état on 30 September 2022.

== Term of office ==
The president is elected directly to a five-year term. Following amendments in the constitution in 2000, the president should serve no more than two terms even though the term limit has not been met by any president yet.

== Titles ==
- 1960–1980: President of the Republic
- 1980–1982: President of Military Committee of Recovery for National Progress
- 1982: Chairman of Provisional Committee of Popular Salvation
- 1982–1983: Head of State
- 1983–1987: Chairman of National Revolutionary Council and Head of State
- 1987–1991: President of Popular Front and Head of State
- 1991–2014: President of the Republic
- 2015: Chairman of National Council for Democracy
- 2015–present: President of the Republic
- 2022–present: President of the Patriotic Movement for Safeguard and Restoration

== List of officeholders ==
Political parties

Voltaic Democratic Union – African Democratic Rally (UDV–RDA)
Popular Front (FP)
Organization for Popular Democracy – Labour Movement (ODP–MT)
Congress for Democracy and Progress (CDP)
People's Movement for Progress (MPP)

Other factions

Military
Independent

Status

Transitional Head of State/President
Acting President in dispute

No.	Portrait	Name (Birth–Death)	Elected	Term of office			Political party	Prime minister(s)
No.	Portrait	Name (Birth–Death)	Elected	Took office	Left office	Time in office	Political party	Prime minister(s)
Republic of Upper Volta
1		Maurice Yaméogo (1921–1993)	1959; 1965	5 August 1960	3 January 1966 (deposed)	5 years, 151 days	UDV–RDA	Position not established
2		Sangoulé Lamizana (1916–2005)	1978	3 January 1966	25 November 1980 (deposed)	14 years, 327 days	Military / Independent	Ouédraogo; Himself; Conombo
3		Saye Zerbo (1932–2013)	—	25 November 1980	7 November 1982 (deposed)	1 year, 347 days	Military	Himself
4		Jean-Baptiste Ouédraogo (born 1942)	—	8 November 1982	4 August 1983 (deposed)	269 days	Military	Sankara
5		Thomas Sankara (1949–1987)	—	4 August 1983	4 August 1984	1 year	Military	Position abolished
Burkina Faso
(5)		Thomas Sankara (1949–1987)	—	4 August 1984	15 October 1987 (assassinated)	3 years, 72 days	Military	Position abolished
6		Blaise Compaoré (born 1951)	1991; 1998; 2005; 2010	15 October 1987	31 October 2014 (resigned)	27 years, 16 days	Military / FP; ODP–MT / CDP	Y. Ouédraogo; Kaboré; K. D. Ouédraogo; Yonli; Zongo; Tiao
–		Honoré Traoré (1957–2026) claimant	—	31 October 2014	1 November 2014	1 day	Military	Position vacant
–		Yacouba Isaac Zida (born 1965)	—	1 November 2014	18 November 2014	17 days	Military (RSP)	Position vacant
–		Michel Kafando (born 1942)	—	18 November 2014	17 September 2015 (deposed)	303 days	Independent	Zida
–		Gilbert Diendéré (born c. 1960)	—	17 September 2015	23 September 2015 (junta dissolved)	6 days	Military (RSP)	Position vacant
–		Chérif Sy (born 1960)	—	17 September 2015	23 September 2015	6 days	Independent	Position vacant
–		Michel Kafando (born 1942)	—	23 September 2015 (restored)	29 December 2015	97 days	Independent	Zida
7		Roch Marc Christian Kaboré (born 1957)	2015; 2020	29 December 2015	24 January 2022 (deposed)	6 years, 26 days	MPP	Thieba; Dabiré; L. Zerbo
–		Paul-Henri Sandaogo Damiba (born 1981)	–	24 January 2022	30 September 2022 (deposed)	249 days	Military	Ouédraogo
–		Ibrahim Traoré (born 1988)	–	30 September 2022	Incumbent	4 years, 21 days	Military	Tambèla; J. E. Ouédraogo

== Latest election ==
Candidate	Party	Votes	%
Roch Marc Christian Kaboré	People's Movement for Progress	1,645,229	57.74
Eddie Komboïgo	Congress for Democracy and Progress	442,693	15.54
Zéphirin Diabré	Union for Progress and Reform	354,988	12.46
Kadré Désiré Ouédraogo	Act Together	95,661	3.36
Tahirou Barry	National Rebirth Party	62,231	2.18
Ablassé Ouedraogo	Alternative Faso	51,461	1.81
Gilbert Noël Ouédraogo	ADF–RDA	45,263	1.59
Yacouba Isaac Zida	Patriotic Movement for Salvation	43,537	1.53
Abdoulaye Soma	Sun of the Future Movement	40,724	1.43
Segui Ambroise Farama	Organisation of African Peoples – Burkina Faso	25,916	0.91
Kiemdoro do Pascalo Sessouma	Vision Burkina	20,068	0.70
Yéli Monique Kam	Movement for the Renaissance of Burkina	15,322	0.54
Claude Aimé Tassembedo	Independent	6,442	0.23
Total		2,849,535	100.00
Valid votes		2,849,535	95.86
Invalid/blank votes		123,055	4.14
Total votes		2,972,590	100.00
Registered voters/turnout		5,918,844	50.22
Source: Constitutional Court

== See also ==
- Politics of Burkina Faso
- List of prime ministers of Burkina Faso
- List of colonial governors of French Upper Volta
