= Ibrahim Traoré =

Leader of Burkina Faso since 2022

Captain Ibrahim Traoré
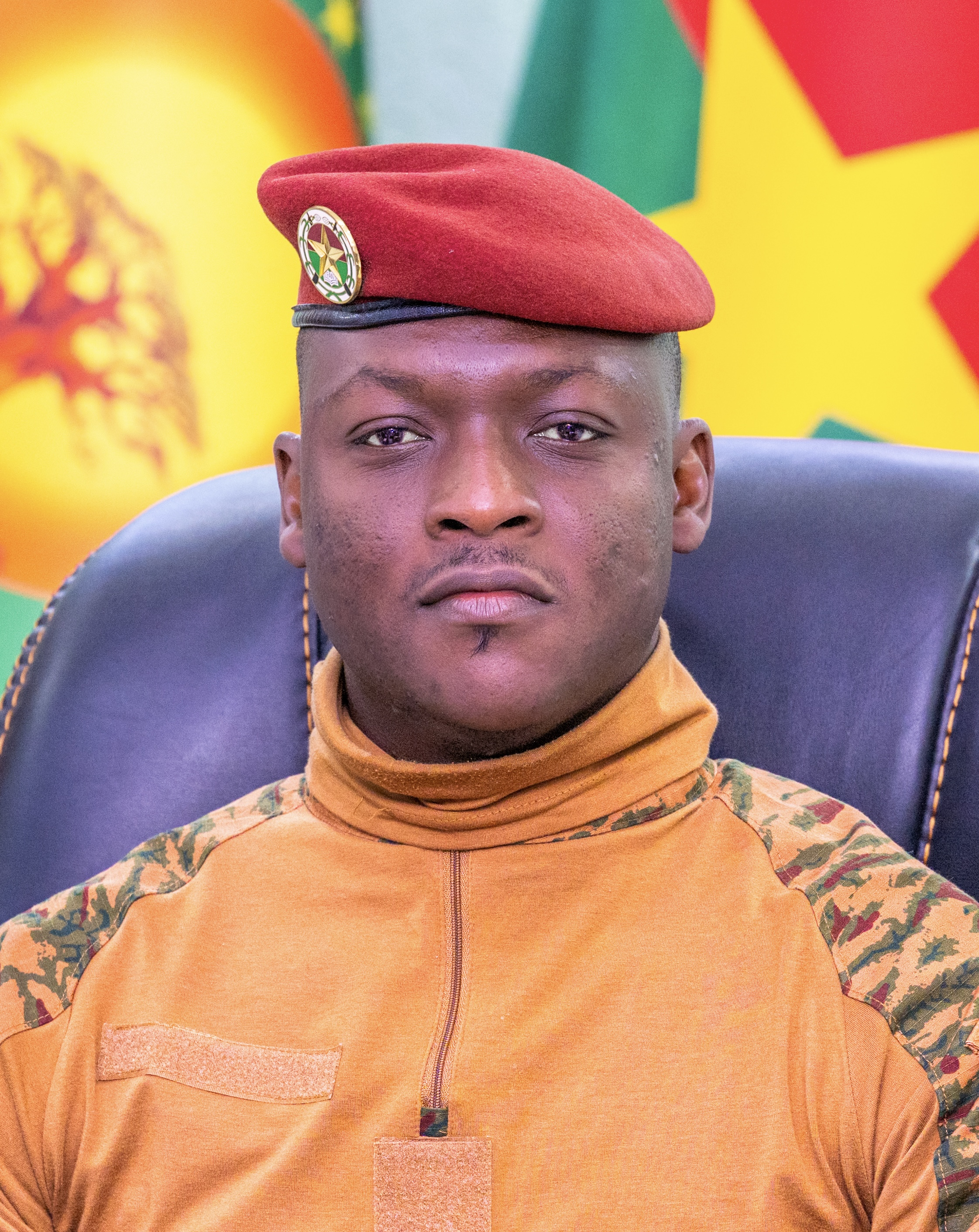
- Traoré in 2026

President of Burkina Faso
- Interim
- Assumed office 6 October 2022
- Prime Minister: Apollinaire J. Kyélem de Tambèla; Jean Emmanuel Ouédraogo
- Preceded by: Paul-Henri Sandaogo Damiba

2nd President of the Patriotic Movement for Safeguard and Restoration
- Incumbent
- Assumed office 30 September 2022
- Preceded by: Paul-Henri Sandaogo Damiba

2nd President of the Confederation of Sahel States
- Incumbent
- Assumed office 24 December 2025
- Preceded by: Assimi Goïta

Personal details
- Born: 14 March 1988 (age 38) Kéra, Burkina Faso
- Education: University of Ouagadougou (BSc); Georges Namoano Military Academy
- Occupation: Military officer, politician
- Website: presidencedufaso.bf
- Nickname: "IB"

Military service
- Allegiance: Burkina Faso
- Branch: Burkina Faso Army
- Service years: 2009–present
- Rank: Captain
- Unit: "Cobra" Special Forces Unit (disputed)
- Battles/wars: Mali War; Islamist insurgency in Burkina Faso; Burkinabè coup d'etats; January 2022; September 2022; September 2023

Ibrahim Traoré (Note: French: [ibʁaim tʁaɔʁe]) (born 14 March 1988) is a Burkinabé military officer and politician who has held power as the interim president of Burkina Faso since the overthrow of his predecessor in a 2022 coup. Ideologically prominent for his nationalist, pan-Africanist, anti-imperialist, and anti-Western views, Traoré is the second leader of the Patriotic Movement for Safeguard and Restoration, the ruling military junta in Burkina Faso since September 2022 and the second president of the Alliance of Sahel States since 2025.

Born in Kéra, located in western Burkina Faso, Traoré graduated from the University of Ouagadougou in 2009 with a bachelor's degree in science and geology. Following his graduation from university, he joined the Burkina Faso Armed Forces and received military training abroad, reportedly in Morocco and France. Traoré gained experience fighting terrorism during the country's jihadist insurgency. In 2019, he was deployed to Mali with the United Nations peacekeeping mission (MINUSMA).

In September 2022, Traoré led a coup against then-Interim President Paul-Henri Sandaogo Damiba and successfully ousted him. At the age of 34, Traoré became the country's second youngest head of state, (Note: Older than Thomas Sankara and younger than Blaise Compaoré.) and also became the world's youngest head of state at the time. During his tenure, Traoré has distanced Burkina Faso from France and ECOWAS, expelled their troops, and has aligned Burkina Faso with Russia, Turkey, China, and Mali and Niger.

Traoré played a major role in the founding of the Alliance of Sahel States, an alliance consisting of Burkina Faso, Mali, and Niger. Under Traoré's leadership, there has been a crackdown on freedom of the press and political opposition, including the unlawful conscription of critics, journalists, activists, prosecutors and judges.

== Early life and education ==
Ibrahim Traoré was born in Kéra, Bondokuy, Mouhoun Province, on 14 March 1988. After receiving his primary education in Bondokuy, he attended a high school in Bobo-Dioulasso, the second-largest city in Burkina Faso, where he was known as being "quiet" and "very talented". From 2006, he studied geology at the University of Ouagadougou.

He was part of the Association of Muslim Students and the Marxist National Association of Students of Burkina Faso (ANEB). In ANEB, he rose to delegate and became known for defending his classmates in disputes. He graduated from the university with honours.

== Military career ==
Traoré joined the Army of Burkina Faso in 2009, and graduated from the Georges Namoano Military Academy. He was sent to Morocco for anti-aircraft training before being transferred to an infantry unit in Kaya, a town in northern Burkina Faso. Promoted to lieutenant in 2014, Traoré joined MINUSMA, a United Nations peacekeeping force involved in the Mali War.

In 2018, he was cited as one of the MINUSMA soldiers who "showed courage" during major rebel attacks in the Tombouctou Region. He returned to Burkina Faso where he assisted in operations against the escalating jihadist insurgency. Traoré fought at Djibo, in the "Otapuanu offensive" of 2019, and several other counter-insurgency operations in the country's north.

He was promoted to captain in 2020. Traoré later said that he became disillusioned with his country's leadership around this time, as he saw the widespread lack of equipment of Burkinabe soldiers, while politicians were handing out "suitcases of money" for bribery. He gradually became the spokesman for soldiers stationed in the north who were frustrated with their government.

== Rise to power ==
Traoré was part of the group of army officers that supported the January 2022 Burkina Faso coup d'état and brought the Patriotic Movement for Safeguard and Restoration military junta to power. From March 2022, he served as the head of an artillery regiment in Kaya. Whether he was ever associated with the "Cobra" special forces, a counterterrorist unit founded in 2019, is disputed. According to the BBC, Al Jazeera, and Die Tageszeitung, he was part of the unit at some point. However, the news magazine Jeune Afrique stated that he was never associated with the "Cobras".

Many supporters of the January coup became dissatisfied with the performance of Paul-Henri Sandaogo Damiba, the junta's leader, regarding his inability to contain the jihadist insurgency. Traoré later said that he and other officers had tried to get Damiba to "refocus" on the rebellion, but eventually opted to overthrow him as "his ambitions were diverting away from what we set out to do". The dissatisfaction about the situation was highest among younger officers who fought against the rebels at the frontlines. In addition, there were delays in pay for the "Cobra" troops.

When the plotters launched their coup on 30 September, Traoré still held the rank of captain. The operation was carried out with the support of the "Cobra" unit. In the direct aftermath of the coup, Traoré was chosen as the new head of the Patriotic Movement for Safeguard and Restoration. On October 6, he also assumed the position of interim president as "Head of State, Supreme Head of the Armed Forces". He initially promised to hold democratic elections in July 2024.

== Presidency ==
=== Consolidation of power ===
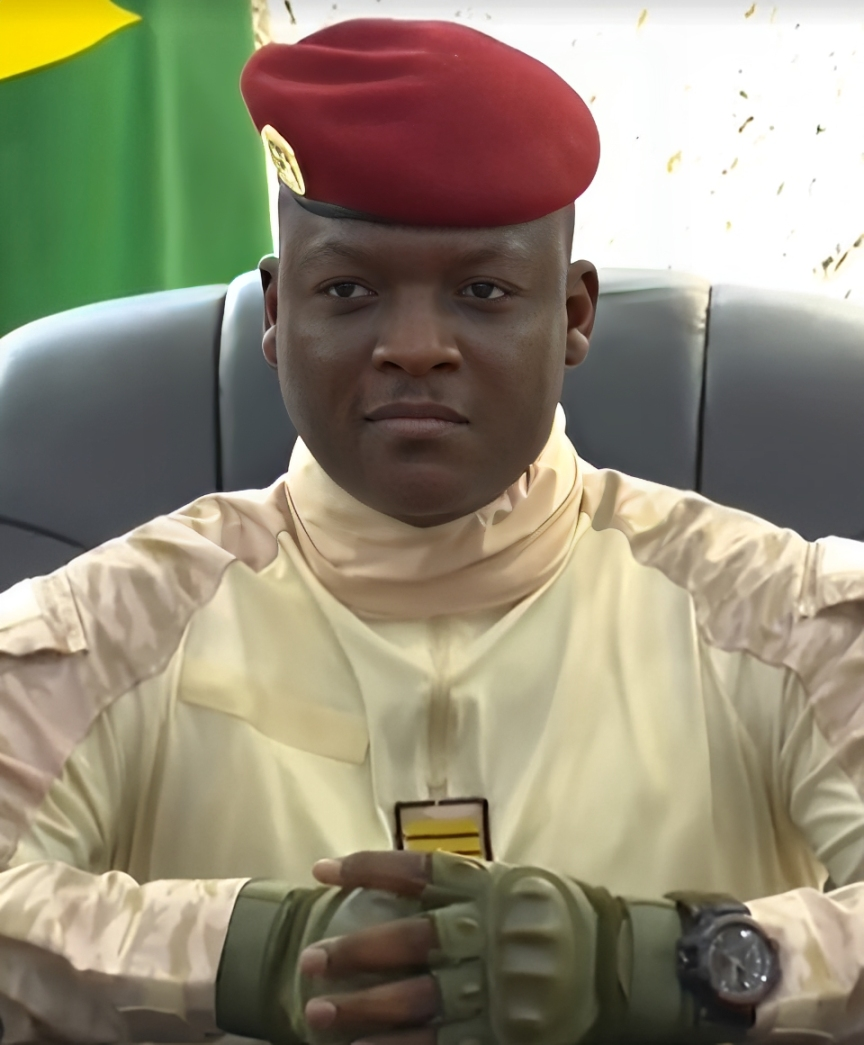
Ibrahim Traoré in 2023

As president, Traoré has maintained the enigmatic and very formal behavior for which he was already known before rising to power. He has kept a tight control on his communication while carefully trying to present himself primarily as a war leader. His presidency has also seen an increase in pro-government propaganda in Burkinabé traditional media and social media. Politically, Le Monde journalist Sophie Douce described Traoré as influenced by Marxism and pan-Africanism.

In Spring 2023, Traoré questioned the planned restoration of democracy for 2024, stating that elections could not be held unless the insurgents were pushed back and the security situation had been improved. This statement reneged on the October 2022 promise he made in negotiations to secure the formal resignation of his deposed predecessor Paul-Henri Sandaogo Damiba, to honour Damiba's pledge to the Economic Community of West African States (ECOWAS) to restore civilian rule in Burkina Faso in two years.

On 26 September 2023, dissatisfied elements of the military again rose up and unsuccessfully attempted to overthrow Traoré. National consultations were held on May 25 and 26, 2024 to discuss the future of the transition in Burkina Faso. While participants included civil society representatives, most political parties boycotted the consultations. The result was the extension of Traoré's mandate for an additional five years while also allowing him to contest the next presidential elections.

On 6 December 2024, Traoré dissolved his government and removed de Tambèla as prime minister. Later that month, the government issued pardons for 21 ex-military officers who had been convicted prior to Traoré's rise to power for their involvement in the 2015 Burkina Faso coup attempt.

In April 2025, Traoré's government announced that it had prevented a planned coup attempt, which it accused the government of Côte d'Ivoire of backing.

In early January 2026, Burkina Faso announced that another assassination attempt was foiled. According to DW Africa, it was the fifth coup attempt in Burkina Faso in the last three years. In late January, Traoré's government ordered the dissolution of all political parties in the country. On 3 April 2026, he told the state television broadcaster that people in Burkina Faso should forget about democracy because it is "not for us."

=== Economic policies ===
==== Natural resources policies ====
In November 2023, the Council of Ministers approved the construction of the country's first gold refinery. This marked a significant development in the country's gold sector, aiming to capitalize on the nation's growing gold mining industry. Traoré seeks to gain more control over its gold resources by refining gold domestically rather than exporting unrefined materials. This would increase government revenue and economic benefits from the gold sector. The refinery is set to create 100 new jobs and 5000 new indirect jobs, with the refinery processing roughly 400 kg of gold ore daily.

In February 2024, Traoré ordered the suspension of the issuance of export permits for small-scale private gold production, a move reportedly aimed at tackling illicit trade—which consists of smuggling gold abroad, avoiding taxes and regulations—and cleaning up the artisanal gold sector. This suspension aims to crack down on such activities and ensure that exported gold is properly documented and contributes to government revenue. The government hopes this suspension will establish a more formal and accountable system for exporting small-scale produced gold.

In December 2024, Traoré officially inaugurated a modern tomato-processing plant located in Pognongo, Yako department, Burkina Faso. The facility, funded by the Cooperative Society at a cost of approximately US$8.9 million, has a processing capacity of around five tonnes of tomatoes per hour and aims to produce tomato paste and other tomato-based products.

In August 2024, Burkina Faso acquired two gold mines; Boungou and Wahgnion, previously owned by London-listed Endeavour Mining, and transferred control to the Société de Participation Minière du Burkina (SOPAMIB), a state-owned mining company. The acquisitions saw a surge in state owned gold, in 2024, state-controlled entities collected over 8 tonnes of gold and in just the first quarter of 2025 more than 11 tonnes of gold were collected. In June 2025, a presidential decree finalised the transfer of five additional gold mining assets into SOPAMIB. These included two operating mines and three exploration licences from subsidiaries of Endeavour Mining and Lilium, namely Wahgnion Gold SA, SEMAFO Boungou SA, Ressources Ferké SARL, Gryphon Minerals Burkina Faso SARL, and Lilium Mining Services Burkina Faso SARL.

=== Social policies ===
In July 2024, Traoré's government announced its intention to criminalise homosexuality in Burkina Faso. In September 2025, homosexuality within Burkina Faso was formally criminalized, the first time such a law existed in the country's history. The provision was included in the Persons and Family Code, which the government said aims to "provide a vision for a fairer, more united Burkinabè family." The code raises the minimum age of marriage and sexual consent to 18, prohibits child and forced marriages, and strengthens legal protections for women in public life.

Traoré's government has faced controversy over its policies towards the freedom of the press. In March 2023, his government banned France24 from broadcasting in the country after the network aired an interview with the leader of al-Qaeda in the Islamic Maghreb, several months after banning Radio France Internationale on grounds of having aired a threat issued by a terrorist leader. In June 2024, four prominent Burkinabé journalists who had criticised the government were detained, with the government announcing several months later that three of the journalists had been forcibly conscripted into the Burkinabé military. In March 2025, an additional three journalists were detained and conscripted. The Burkinabé Journalists’ Association was dissolved in March 2025. Independent radio station Radio Oméga was suspended from August to September 2023 for its coverage of the 2023 Niger coup and from August 2025 to October 2025 for calling Traoré's government a "junta".

Traoré's government has cracked down on religious networks within Burkina Faso, especially those accused of being radical, and adopted a religious freedom law which would penalize practices authorities classify as religious abuses. He also announced plans to recall Burkinabé students who were studying Islam in Saudi Arabia.

=== Military policies ===
The Islamist insurgency in Burkina Faso has been a major focus of Traoré's presidency. In his first month in power, his government launched a major recruitment campaign for the Volunteers for the Defense of the Homeland (VDP) auxiliary force, recruiting fifty thousand people. In April 2023, Traoré declared a "general mobilisation" of the population to support the military, as rebel forces continued to increase the rate of their attacks. Traoré publicly pledged to reconquer all rebel-held areas and that there would be no negotiations until the insurgency had been greatly weakened. In July 2023, his government implemented a number of new taxes intended to raise funds for the military, including a 5% tax on phone and internet bills and a 10% tax on subscriptions to television channels.

As of February 2024, the number of deaths caused by Islamist violence had significantly increased since 2022. According to experts and human rights watchdogs, violence has worsened since Traoré came to power.

On 23 May 2024, Traoré called on the Burkinabe population to assist the military in digging trenches around settlements. On 24 August 2024, jihadists from Jama'at Nasr al-Islam wal-Muslimin (JNIM) killed over 200 civilians who were digging trenches around the town of Barsalogho in Sanmatenga Province. The civilians had been ordered by the military to dig the trenches as part of a plan by the Minister of Civil Service. Traoré was criticised for endorsing the construction of the trenches by civilians. As of a week after the massacre, Traoré had yet released an official statement about the attack.

According to ACLED, the Burkinabè military and VDP militias killed over 1,000 civilians between January and July 2024. The military summarily executed at least 223 civilians, including 56 children in the Nondin and Soro massacres on February 25, 2024. Human Rights Watch reported that up to 400 civilians were killed during counterinsurgency operations in 15 villages between April 27 and May 4, 2024.

In July 2026, Traoré presided over the launch of new dress uniforms for the Burkinabè military. The televised event showcased the use of Burkinabè fabric, with bright purple and red stripes, red hats, and gold coloured epaulets.

=== Foreign policies ===
==== Relations with other African states ====
In February 2023, Traoré's government expressed support for a federation with Mali and both invited Niger. All three countries are under military leadership and, if they were to become a union, would be the largest country ruled by military junta. In July 2024, the three countries formed the Alliance of Sahel States.

==== Relations with France ====
In February 2023, Traoré's government expelled French forces from Burkina Faso assisting in fighting the local insurgency. He subsequently declared that his nation wanted to "look at other horizons, because we want win-win partnerships", supporting the diversification of Burkina Faso's international partnerships. To replace French military support, Traoré forged closer ties to Turkey and Russia.

==== Relations with Russia ====
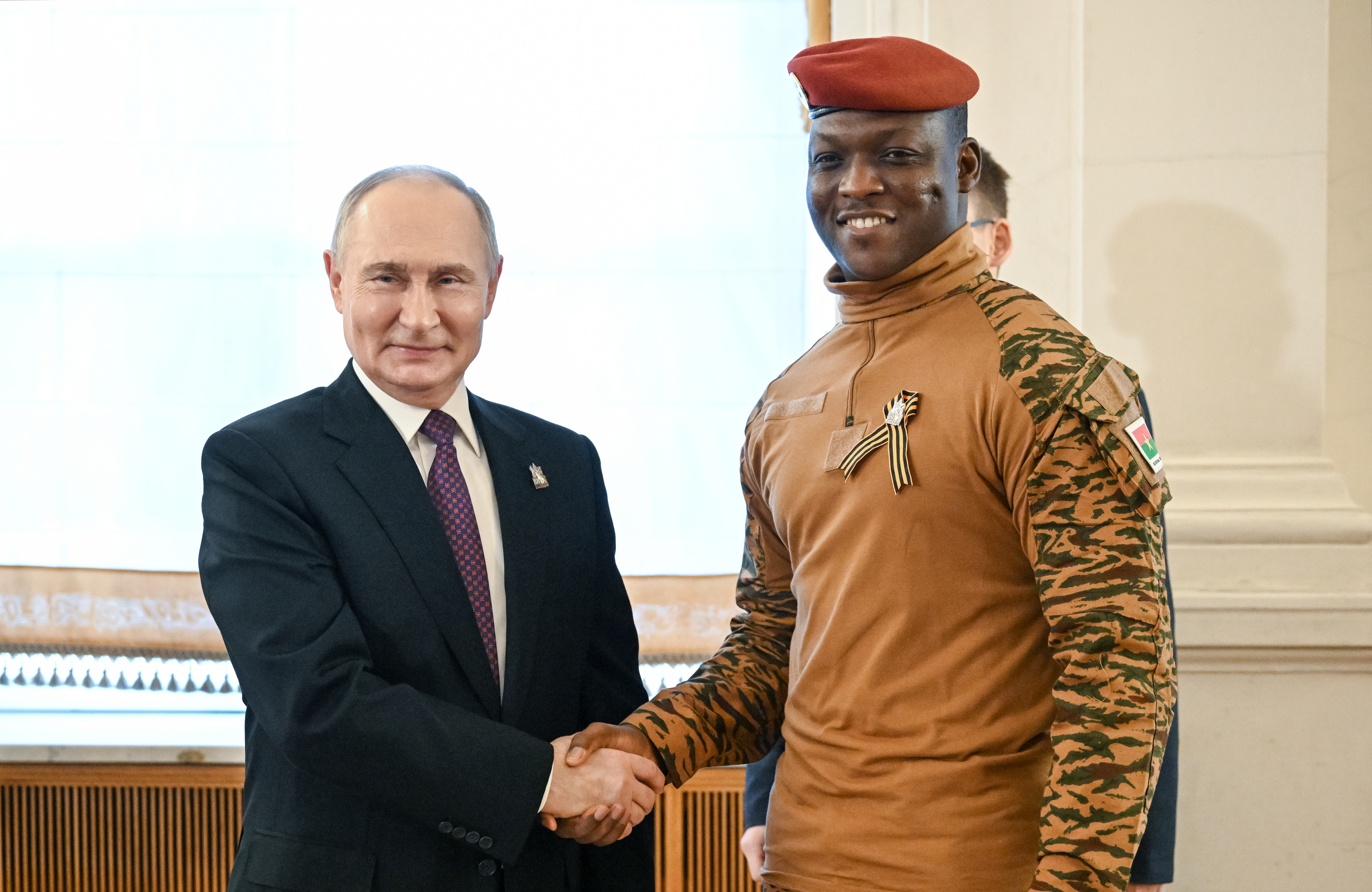
Traoré with Russian president Vladimir Putin in Moscow in May 2025

According to Reuters and The New York Times, Traoré was suspected of having a connection with Russian mercenary organization Wagner Group due to having expressed anti-French and pro-Russian views. As Traoré entered Ouagadougou, the nation's capital, supporters cheered, some waving Russian flags. The Government of Ghana publicly alleged that Traoré began collaborating with the Wagner Group following the coup, enlisting the mercenaries against the jihadist rebels. Traoré denied this, stating that "our Wagner are the VDP", referencing the Volunteers for the Defense of the Homeland.

On 29 July 2023, following the 2023 Russia–Africa Summit, Traoré said that the people of his country support Russia, and communicated that a decision had been made to reopen the Russian embassy, which was closed in 1992. According to the newspaper Le Monde in May 2023, "the Traoré regime seems, for the time being, to be favouring the use of its own forces in the fight against the jihadists" and has not asked Wagner's Russians for help.

Russian troops, including the Wagner Group, were eventually deployed in Burkina Faso in January 2024.

==== Relations with Israel ====
Burkina Faso and Israel maintain continuous diplomatic relations. On 26 June 2026, Ibrahim Traoré officially received the Letters of Credence of Israel's new regional ambassador to the country, Simon-Clément Seroussi. It has caused some commentators to question his anti-imperialist stance.

== Public image ==
According to Farouk Chothia of the BBC News, Traoré has "built the persona of a pan-Africanist leader determined to free his nation from what he regards as the clutches of Western imperialism and neo-colonialism." Nigerian journalist Azubuike Ishiekwene has written that Traoré "has portrayed himself as the new face of the African Renaissance," noting that he dresses "the part in stylish fatigues and matching neck scarves, berets, and boots," while giving speeches "against Western imperialism and colonialism, vowing to create conditions at home to stem youth migration and tackle insurgency." According to Aanu Adeoye of the Financial Times, Traoré "styles himself after 20th century Burkinabe revolutionary leader Thomas Sankara." A writer for the Italian-based TNGO states, "His position remains thin-centered and aims to exploit existing Burkinabe social fault lines and vulnerabilities, using populism as a strategic choice."

In May 2025, Enoch Randy Aikins of the Institute for Security Studies described Traoré as "arguably Africa's most popular, if not favourite, president." Kenyan activist PLO Lumumba described him as a "symbol" of African renaissance. Ebenezer Obadare described Traoré as a pointer to everything that is wrong with the continent.

In August 2025, Ghanaian entertainer Lil Win premiered his movie Captain Ibrahim Traoré: The Last African Hero in honour of the leadership style of the Burkinabé leader. The film was acknowledged by Traoré after its release.

== Awards and honors ==
=== Foreign honors ===
- Mali:
  - Grand Cross of the National Order of Mali (2025)

== See also ==
- List of current heads of state and government

Political offices
Preceded by Paul-Henri Sandaogo Damiba	President of the Patriotic Movement for Safeguard and Restoration; 2022–present	Incumbent
Preceded by Paul-Henri Sandaogo Damiba	Interim President of Burkina Faso; 2022–present	Incumbent
