= List of years in Burkina Faso =

This is a list of years in Burkina Faso. For only articles about years in Burkina Faso that have been written, see Category:Years in Burkina Faso.

== Twenty-first century ==
2020s
2020
2021
2022
2023
2024
2025
2026
2027
2028
2029

2010s
2010
2011
2012
2013
2014
2015
2016
2017
2018
2019

2000s
2000
2001
2002
2003
2004
2005
2006
2007
2008
2009

== Twentieth century ==
1990s
1990
1991
1992
1993
1994
1995
1996
1997
1998
1999

1980s
1984
1985
1986
1987
1988
1989

1980s
1980
1981
1982
1983

1970s
1970
1971
1972
1973
1974
1975
1976
1977
1978
1979

1960s
1960
1961
1962
1963
1964
1965
1966
1967
1968
1969

== See also ==
- Timeline of Ouagadougou

== Bibliography ==
- "Burkina Faso". Political Chronology of Africa. Political Chronologies of the World. Europa Publications. 2001. ISBN 0203409957.
- Andreas Mehler; et al., eds. (2011). "Burkina Faso". Africa Yearbook: Politics, Economy and Society South of the Sahara in 2010. Vol. 7. Koninklijke Brill. ISSN 1871-2525.
- Lawrence Rupley; et al. (2013). "Chronology". Historical Dictionary of Burkina Faso (3rd ed.). Scarecrow Press. ISBN 978-0-8108-8010-8.
