= List of ambassadors of Burkina Faso to the United States =

Coordinates: 38°54′45.7″N 77°03′06.8″W

Ambassador of Burkina Faso to the United States
- Incumbent; Alpha Barry since August 8, 2016
- Inaugural holder: Frédéric Guirma
- Formation: April 17, 1961

The Burkinabe ambassador in Washington, D. C. is the official representative of the Government in Ouagadougou to the Government of the United States. The ambassador's office is located at the Embassy of Burkina Faso in Washington, D.C.

== List of representatives ==
Diplomatic agreement/designated	Diplomatic accreditation	Ambassador	Observations	Prime Minister of Burkina Faso	List of presidents of the United States	Term end
April 17, 1961			EMBASSY OPENED	Maurice Yaméogo	John F. Kennedy	
March 22, 1961	April 17, 1961	Frédéric Guirma		Maurice Yaméogo	John F. Kennedy	
December 7, 1962	January 18, 1963	Boureima John Kabore		Maurice Yaméogo	John F. Kennedy	
September 23, 1966	October 3, 1966	Paul Rouamba		Sangoulé Lamizana	Lyndon B. Johnson	
August 9, 1972	September 7, 1972	Telesphore Yaguibou		Sangoulé Lamizana	Richard Nixon	
September 14, 1981		Dénis G. Nikièma	Chargé d'affaires (*1948)	Saye Zerbo	Ronald Reagan	
November 13, 1981	December 8, 1981	Tiémoko Marc Garango	(*1927 06 mars 2015 enOuagadougou)	Saye Zerbo	Ronald Reagan	
May 25, 1983		Dénis G. Nikièma	Chargé d'affaires	Thomas Sankara	Ronald Reagan	
January 17, 1984	March 13, 1984	Doulaye Corentin Ki	(* 1946 en Kissan)	Thomas Sankara	Ronald Reagan	
	1985	Mélégué Maurice Traoré	Chargé d'affaires	Thomas Sankara	Ronald Reagan	1986
March 3, 1986	March 11, 1986	Léandre B. Bassole	Ministre des Relations Extérieures et de la Coopération	Thomas Sankara	Ronald Reagan	
March 14, 1988	March 22, 1988	Paul-Désiré Kabore		Thomas Sankara	Ronald Reagan	
October 19, 1993	December 9, 1993	Gaëtan Rimwanguiya Ouedraogo		Youssouf Ouédraogo	Bill Clinton	
August 4, 1984			The Republic of Upper Volta changed its name to Burkina Faso	Thomas Sankara	Ronald Reagan	
December 10, 1997	March 16, 1998	Bruno Nongoma Zidouemba		Kadré Désiré Ouédraogo	Bill Clinton	
January 14, 2002	February 14, 2002	Tertius Zongo		Paramanga Ernest Yonli	George W. Bush	
January 14, 2008	January 23, 2008	Paramanga Ernest Yonli		Tertius Zongo	George W. Bush	
September 2, 2011	September 9, 2011	Seydou Bouda		Luc-Adolphe Tiao	Barack Obama	
August 8, 2016		Alpha Barry		Paul Kaba Thieba	Barack Obama	

- Burkina Faso–United States relations
