= 2020 in Burkina Faso =

- Decades: 2000s; 2010s; 2020s
- See also: Other events of 2020; Timeline of Burkinabé history

== Incumbents ==
- President: Roch Marc Christian Kaboré
- Prime minister: Christophe Joseph Marie Dabiré

== Events ==
=== January ===
- 4 January - Toeni bus bombing: A school bus hits an improvised explosive device in Toeni, killing 14 and injuring 9. No group claims responsibility.
- 20 January - Nagraogo massacre: JNIM jihadists kill 36 civilians in Nagraogo and Alamou, burn Nagraogo’s market, and trigger two days of national mourning.
- 21 January - The National Assembly passes a law institutionalizing government support for self-defense groups.

=== February ===
- 1 February - An attack in Lamdamol village kills at least 20 civilians, including a nurse.
- 16 February - Pansi church shooting: Gunmen attacked a Protestant church in Yagha Province. 24 are killed, 18 injured, and three taken hostage; both Christians and Muslims are killed.
- 29 February - At least 15 people are reportedly killed during a joint security and civil defense operation near Kelbo.

=== March ===
- 8 March - Multiple attacks by self-defense groups in Yatenga province kill 43 Peuhl villagers.

=== April ===
- 9 April - Security forces execute 31 detainees in Djibo hours after arresting them.

=== May ===
- 30 May - Barsalogho aid convoy attack: Unknown militants ambush an aid convoy near Sanmatenga Province, killing 13, wounding 40, and leaving 6 gendarmes missing; the convoy was returning from Foube and escorted by Burkinabe gendarmes.

=== July ===
- 27 July - Sixteen schools in eastern Burkina Faso are burnt down by armed groups, threatening the education of 3,000 children.

=== October ===
- 4 October - A night attack on a convoy of 46 people, who were returning to their homes from the town of Pissila, hoping for improved security, leading to the death of 25 people, all men.

=== November ===
- 22 November - 2020 Burkinabé general election President Roch Marc Christian Kabore reelected.

=== December ===
- 28 December - President Roch Marc Christian Kabore is sworn in for a second term.

== Predicted and Scheduled Events ==
- 2020 Burkinabé constitutional referendum

== Deaths ==
- March 18 - Rose Marie Compaoré, politician

== See also ==
- Boko Haram
