= 2007 in Burkina Faso =

- Decades: 1980s; 1990s; 2000s; 2010s; 2020s
- See also: Other events of 2007; Timeline of Burkinabé history

Events from the year 2007 in Burkina Faso.

== Incumbents ==
- President: Blaise Compaoré
- Prime Minister: Paramanga Ernest Yonli (until 11 June), Tertius Zongo (from 11 June)

== Events ==
=== March ===
- 6 March – Japan signs an agreement with Burkina Faso to aid the country with $3.4 million to combat food insecurity within the country.
- 21 March – Government begins a vaccination campaign in the capital against Meningitis.

=== May ===
- 6 May – Burkinabe parliamentary election, 2007

=== October ===
- 16 October – Libya, Vietnam, Burkina Faso, Croatia and Costa Rica are elected to the United Nations Security Council as non-permanent members.
- 22 October – The EDCTP conference is held in Ouagadougou to discuss and focus on clinical trials throughout the African continent.
