= Ousséni Tamboura =

Minister of Communications and Parliamentary Relations
- In office January 10, 2021 – January 24, 2022
- Preceded by: Remis Fulgance Dandjinou
- Succeeded by: Valérie Kaboré

Personal details
- Party: ADF-RDA (2000–2009); MPP (2009–2022)
- Education: University of Ouagadougou; Cheikh Anta Diop University
- Occupation: Lawyer

Ousséni Tamboura is a Burkinabe politician and lawyer who served as Minister of Communications from 2021 until the January 2022 Burkina Faso coup d'état.

== Biography ==
Tamboura is a lawyer. He studied law at the University of Ouagadougou and at Cheikh Anta Diop University in Dakar. He began his political career in 2000, serving as a member of parliament under the Alliance for Democracy and Federation – African Democratic Rally (ADF/RDA) party between 2002 and 2007. In parliament, he chaired the Employment Committee and Gender Caucus.

In 2007, Tamboura was appointed Minister-Delegate for Literacy and Informal Education, a position he held from June 2007 to April 2011. He resigned from ADF-RDA after the reshuffle of Luc-Adolphe Tiao's government. In 2012, Tamboura led the National Employment Agency.

In 2015, under the People's Movement for Progress (MPP) party, Tamboura was elected as a deputy to the National Assembly. In 2016, he was appointed chairman of the parliamentary inquiry committee on mining titles. In January 2021, Tamboura was appointed Minister of Communications. On December 8, 2021, Prime Minister Christophe Dabiré submitted his resignation and that of his government. The new government led by Lassina Zerbo reinstalled Tamboura as Minister of Communications. In the reappointment, Tamboura also became Minister of Culture, Arts, and Tourism.

Tamboura was deposed in the January 2022 Burkina Faso coup d'état led by Paul-Henri Sandaogo Damiba. He was replaced by Valérie Kaboré.
