= 2016 in Burkina Faso =

- Decades: 1990s; 2000s; 2010s; 2020s
- See also: Other events of 2016; Timeline of Burkinabé history

The following lists events that happened during 2016 in Burkina Faso.

== Incumbents ==
- President: Roch Marc Christian Kaboré
- Prime Minister: Paul Kaba Thieba and Christophe Joseph Marie Dabiré

== Events ==
=== January ===
- 15 January – Burkina Faso security forces stormed the Hotel Splendid which had been under attack by Al Qaeda in the Islamic Maghreb militants, amongst other places.
