= 2013 in Burkina Faso =

- Decades: 1990s; 2000s; 2010s; 2020s
- See also: Other events of 2013; Timeline of Burkinabé history

The Boromo bus station in October 2013

Events in the year 2013 in Burkina Faso.

== Incumbents ==
- President: Blaise Compaoré
- Prime Minister: Luc-Adolphe Tiao

== Events ==
=== May ===
- 9 May – Burkina Faso foreign minister Djibrill Bassole faints during a press conference with Turkish foreign minister Ahmet Davutoglu.

=== June ===
- 2 June – Burkina Faso's national soccer team beats Ghana's, making their way to the finals of the African Cup.

=== July ===
- 16 July Protestors hold a sit-in in front of the Ministry of Communication to protest government censorship of journalists working for Radiodiffusion Télévision du Burkina (RTB), a Burkinabé state-run media company.
- 28 July – Thousands of protesters marched through Ouagadougou in opposition of long-time President Blaise Compaore's attempt to his rule through the formation of a new Senate.
- 30 July – The World Bank approves a $50 million IDA credit to the country to help improve access to electricity.

=== November ===
- 24 November – An African Rights Court hears a case from family of murdered Burkinabé journalist, Norbert Zongo, accusing the government of refusing to investigate the murder.

=== December ===
- 20 December - Country is admitted to the Forest Carbon Partnership Facility (FCPF), putting in place a strategy to combat deforestation.
