= Eric Bougouma =

Burkinabe politician (born 1971)

Minister of Infrastructure of Burkina Faso
- In office January 12, 2016 – December 8, 2021
- President: Roch Kaboré
- Prime Minister: Paul Kaba Thieba; Christophe Dabiré
- Preceded by: Moumouni Guiguemde
- Succeeded by: Ollo Franck Kansie

Personal details
- Born: Eric Wendenmenegha Bougouma; December 12, 1971 (age 54) Ouagadougou, Burkina Faso

Eric Wendenmenegha Bougouma is a Burkinabe statesman and politician who served as the Minister of Infrastructure of Burkina Faso from January 12, 2016, to December 8, 2021.

== Biography ==
Bougouma was born on December 14, 1972, in Ouagadougou, Burkina Faso. Bougouma was first elected in 2015 as a deputy in the National Assembly of Burkina Faso for Ganzourgou Province. He was appointed by Prime Minister Paul Kaba Thieba as the Minister of Infrastructure of Burkina Faso on January 12, 2016. One of Bougouma's first actions was a deal with the World Bank for funding to build a road between Manga and Zabré. He then began repairs on National Road 22, which connects Djibo to Kongoussi. Bougouma's plan for infrastructure for 2017 was connecting various cities and rebuilding roads across Centre-Ouest Region.

Bougouma also oversaw the creation of the largest highway interchange in Ouagadougou in 2018. The interchange, and many others built by Bougouma were financed by external banks. In 2021, Prime Minister Christophe Dabiré submitted his resignation to President Roch Marc Christian Kaboré, marking Bougouma's resignation as well. Ollo Franck Kansie succeeded him in Lassina Zerbo's government. Bougouma was also accused of using government funds to enrich himself.
