= 2011 in Burkina Faso =

- Decades: 1990s; 2000s; 2010s; 2020s
- See also: Other events of 2011; Timeline of Burkinabé history

Events in the year 2011 in Burkina Faso.

== Incumbents ==
- President: Blaise Compaoré
- Prime Minister: Tertius Zongo (until 18 April) Luc-Adolphe Tiao (from 18 April)

== Events ==
=== April ===
- 15 April – Curfew is temporarily set in the capital after mutineers burn down government buildings, with associating riots resulting in the injuries of 45 people. Resulting governmental changes include the prime minister and foreign affairs minister being replaced.

=== May ===
- 23 May – In support for better working conditions for teachers, thousands of students march through the streets of the capital.

=== September ===
- 14 September – The governments of Burkina Faso and Niger announce they will not allow recently ousted Muammar Qaddafi into the country for haven.

=== December ===
- 15 December - Victoria's Secret incurs a scandal in which they are revealed to have been sourcing their cotton from child labor farms in Burkina Faso, protested by many human rights groups.
