= 2019 in Burkina Faso =

- Decades: 1990s; 2000s; 2010s; 2020s
- See also: Other events of 2019; Timeline of Burkinabé history

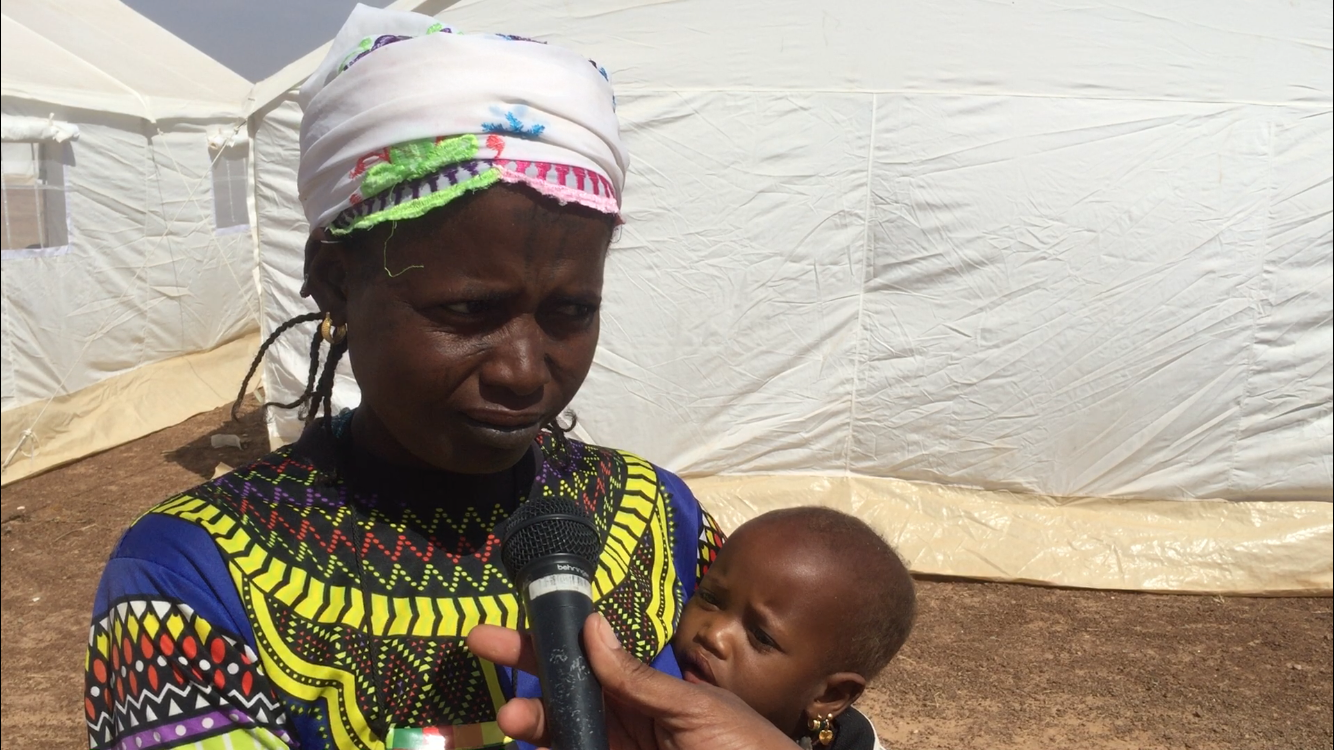
Alimata Dicko, in a displaced persons camp after surviving a massacre in the Yirgou region.

Events in the year 2019 in Burkina Faso.

== Incumbents ==
- President: Roch Marc Christian Kaboré
- Prime Minister: Paul Kaba Thieba (from 2016 until 19 January) Christophe Joseph Marie Dabiré (since 24 January)

== Events ==
- 10 January – In a jihadist attack on the village of Gasseliki, 12 civilians are killed.
- 27 January – At least 10 people are killed in the Soum Province after nearly a dozen gunmen opened fire on civilians at a market.
