= 2015 in Burkina Faso =

- Decades: 1990s; 2000s; 2010s; 2020s
- See also: Other events of 2015; Timeline of Burkinabé history

The following lists events that happened during 2015 in Burkina Faso.

== Incumbents ==
- President: Michel Kafando (until 17 September), Gilbert Diendéré and Chérif Sy (from 17 September until 23 September), Michel Kafando (from 23 September until 29 December), Roch Marc Christian Kaboré (from 29 December)
- Prime Minister: Yacouba Isaac Zida (until 17 September), vacant (17 September until 23 September), Yacouba Isaac Zida (from 23 September until 29 December), Paul Kaba Thieba and Christophe Joseph Marie Dabiré (from 29 December)

== Events ==
=== April ===
- 1 April – Over 115,000 chickens are culled due to a bird flu scare.
