= 2000 in Burkina Faso =

- Decades: 1980s; 1990s; 2000s; 2010s; 2020s
- See also: Other events of 2000; Timeline of Burkinabé history

Events in the year 2000 in Burkina Faso.

== Incumbents ==
- President: Blaise Compaoré
- Prime Minister: Kadré Désiré Ouédraogo (until 29 December), Paramanga Ernest Yonli (from 29 December)

== Events ==
- December – The government agrees to the formation of a U.N. body to oversee weapons imports to the country following claims that it had aided in arms smuggling to rebels in Sierra Leone and Angola.
