= 1996 in Burkina Faso =

- Decades: 1970s; 1980s; 1990s; 2000s; 2010s
- See also: Other events of 1996; Timeline of Burkinabé history

Events in the year 1996 in Burkina Faso.

== Incumbents ==
- President: Blaise Compaoré
- Prime Minister: Michel Kafando (until 6 February), Kadré Désiré Ouédraogo (from 6 February)

== Events ==
- February 5 – The Congress for Democracy and Progress (CDP) was founded.
