= 2008 in Burkina Faso =

- Decades: 1980s; 1990s; 2000s; 2010s; 2020s
- See also: Other events of 2008; Timeline of Burkinabé history

Events in the year 2008 in Burkina Faso.

== Incumbents ==
- President: Blaise Compaoré
- Prime Minister: Tertius Zongo

== Events ==
=== February ===
- February 1 – Minister of health announces the country is at major risk for a Meningitis outbreak due to lack of preparation.
- February 22 – Riots break out in Bobo-Dioulasso and Ouhigouya due to increasing prices of basic necessities and unstable economic conditions.

=== July ===
- July 16 – President Compaoré meets with American President George W Bush at the White House.

=== November ===
- November 15 – More than 60 people are killed near the town of Boromo after a truck collided with an overloaded bus.
