= 2014 in Burkina Faso =

- Decades: 1990s; 2000s; 2010s; 2020s
- See also: Other events of 2014; Timeline of Burkinabé history

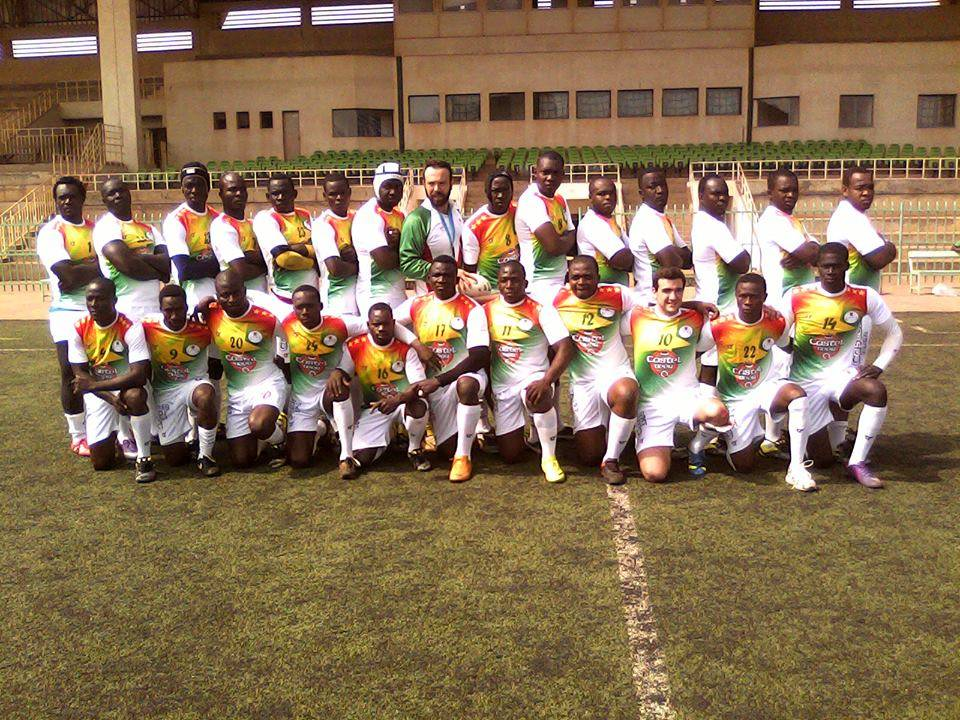
The Burkina Faso national rugby union team, 2014

The following lists events that happened during 2014 in Burkina Faso.

== Incumbents ==
- President: Blaise Compaoré (until 31 October), Honoré Traoré (from 31 October until 1 November), Yacouba Isaac Zida (from 1 November until 18 November), Michel Kafando (from 18 November)
- Prime Minister: Luc-Adolphe Tiao (until 31 October), vacant (31 October until 18 November), Yacouba Isaac Zida (from 18 November)

== Events ==
=== July ===
- 24 July – Air Algérie Flight 5017 loses contact with air traffic controllers 50 minutes after takeoff. It was travelling between Ouagadougou and Algiers, Algeria with 116 people on board. The wreckage is later found in Mali.

=== October ===
- 30 October – Protestors demanding the resignation of President Blaise Compaoré set fire to parliament and other official buildings. The Chief of the Army dismisses the government and national assembly and announces a curfew and a transition time of one year. Compaoré fled to Dakar, Senegal.
- 31 October – Blaise Compaoré resigns as President of Burkina Faso following the 2014 Burkinabé uprising. General Honoré Traoré assumes leadership on a transitional basis.

=== November ===
- 17 November – Former Burkina Faso foreign minister Michel Kafando is named as transitional President.
