= 2017 in Burkina Faso =

- Decades: 1990s; 2000s; 2010s; 2020s
- See also: Other events of 2017; Timeline of Burkinabé history

This article is a list of events in the year 2017 in Burkina Faso.

== Incumbents ==
- President: Roch Marc Christian Kaboré
- Prime Minister: Paul Kaba Thieba

== Events ==
- 13 August – The 2017 Ouagadougou attack.

== Deaths ==
- 30 May – Valère Somé, politician, scholar and revolutionary leader (b. 1950).
- 19 August – Salif Diallo, politician (b. 1957)
