= 2010 in Burkina Faso =

- Decades: 1990s; 2000s; 2010s; 2020s
- See also: Other events of 2010; Timeline of Burkinabé history

Events in the year 2010 in Burkina Faso.

== Incumbents ==
- President: Blaise Compaoré
- Prime Minister: Tertius Zongo

== Events ==
=== February ===
- 12 February – President Compaoré announces a plan to lift financial barriers to family planning to lower the maternal mortality rate within the country.

=== March ===
- 31 March – UNITAR establishes a headquarters in the capital, Ouagadougou.

=== June ===
- 25 June – The FAO and EU begin providing high quality seeds to Burkinabé farmers to combat food insecurity to at-risk regions.

=== July ===
- July-October – In floods throughout central and west Africa, 377 people die, including 16 in Burkina Faso.

=== November ===
- 2 November – Burkina Faso, along with 7 other West African countries, sets plan to regulate cosmetics as part of an agreement between WAEMU member states.
- 5 November – Interpol rescues over 100 people in the country and arrests 11 individuals connected to a child trafficking operation.
