= 2018 in Burkina Faso =

- Decades: 1990s; 2000s; 2010s; 2020s
- See also: Other events of 2018; Timeline of Burkinabé history

Events in the year 2018 in Burkina Faso.

== Incumbents ==
- President: Roch Marc Christian Kaboré
- Prime Minister: Paul Kaba Thieba

== Events ==
- 2 March – 2018 Ouagadougou attacks

== Deaths ==
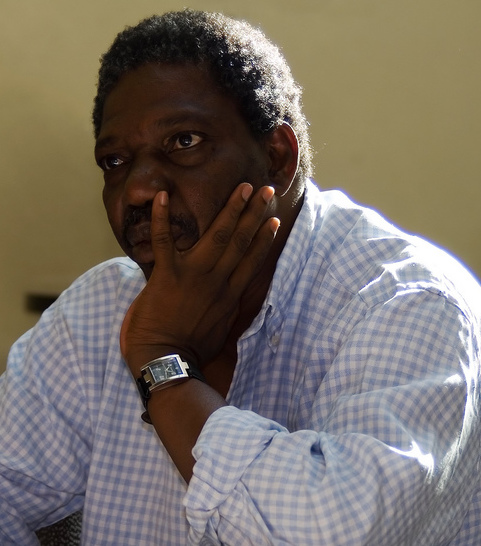
Idrissa Ouédraogo

- 18 February – Idrissa Ouédraogo, film director (b. 1954).
