= 2005 in Burkina Faso =

- Decades: 1980s; 1990s; 2000s; 2010s; 2020s
- See also: Other events of 2005; Timeline of Burkinabé history

Events from the year 2005 in Burkina Faso.

== Incumbents ==
- President: Blaise Compaoré
- Prime Minister: Paramanga Ernest Yonli

== Events ==
=== May ===
- 6 May – Burkinabe presidential election, 2005

=== July ===
- 30 July – First microfinance agency is launched within the country

=== August ===
- 14 August – 5 senior officials arrested for stealing foreign aid meant to combat hunger in rural areas
