= 2021 in Burkina Faso =

- Decades: 2000s; 2010s; 2020s
- See also: Other events of 2021; Timeline of Burkinabé history

== Incumbents ==
- President: Roch Marc Christian Kaboré
- Prime Minister: Christophe Joseph Marie Dabiré

== Events ==
Ongoing: COVID-19 pandemic and terrorism in Burkina Faso

=== January ===
- January 7 – Prime Minister Christophe Joseph Marie Dabiré is reappointed.

=== February ===
- February 10 – President Kaboré travels to Brussels, Belgium, on the first stop of a European tour.
- February 13 – Ramesh Rajasingham, acting United Nations assistant secretary-general for humanitarian affairs, tells the Associated Press that Burkina Faso is on the brink of a humanitarian crisis as 3.5 million people need assistance.
- February 25 – Burkina Faso is one of four countries added to the Financial Action Task Force (FATF) list of places that are only partially in compliance with international efforts against financing terrorism and money laundering.

=== April ===
- April 26 - Spanish journalists David Beriáin and Roberto Fraile, along with Irish activist Rory Young, were killed - reportedly by members of jihadist group Jama'at Nasr al-Islam wal Muslimin - while accompanying an anti-poaching patrol near Natiaboni.

=== May ===
- May 3 - Over 100 Islamist militants attacked the village of Kodyel, Foutouri, Komondjari Province, Est Region, killing 30 people.

=== June ===
- June 4-5: More than 100 civilians were killed in Solhan and Tadaryat, Yagha Province.

=== November ===
- 21 November - A healthcare centre supported by Médecins Sans Frontières (MSF) in Foube, Barsalogho department, in the Centre-North region of Burkina Faso, was burnt down. A member of the MSF team was injured during an attack by unidentified armed men, probably targeting the Foube police post, a few hundred metres away. The violence continues to increase daily in Burkina Faso.

=== December ===
- 23 December - AFP reports that suspected militants ambushed and killed 41 members of a column of civilian fighters from the Homeland Defence Volunteers (VDP), a group the government funds and trains to contain Islamist insurgents. The government of Burkina Faso has declared a two-day mourning period.

== Culture ==
- January 30 – Panafrican Film and Television Festival of Ouagadougou (FESPACO) is postponed indefinitely.

== See also ==
- COVID-19 pandemic in Africa
- Boko Haram
- Economic Community of West African States
- Community of Sahel–Saharan States
- Politics of Burkina Faso
- National Assembly of Burkina Faso
- Organisation internationale de la Francophonie
- Community of Sahel–Saharan States
