= 2001 in Burkina Faso =

- Decades: 1980s; 1990s; 2000s; 2010s; 2020s
- See also: Other events of 2001; Timeline of Burkinabé history

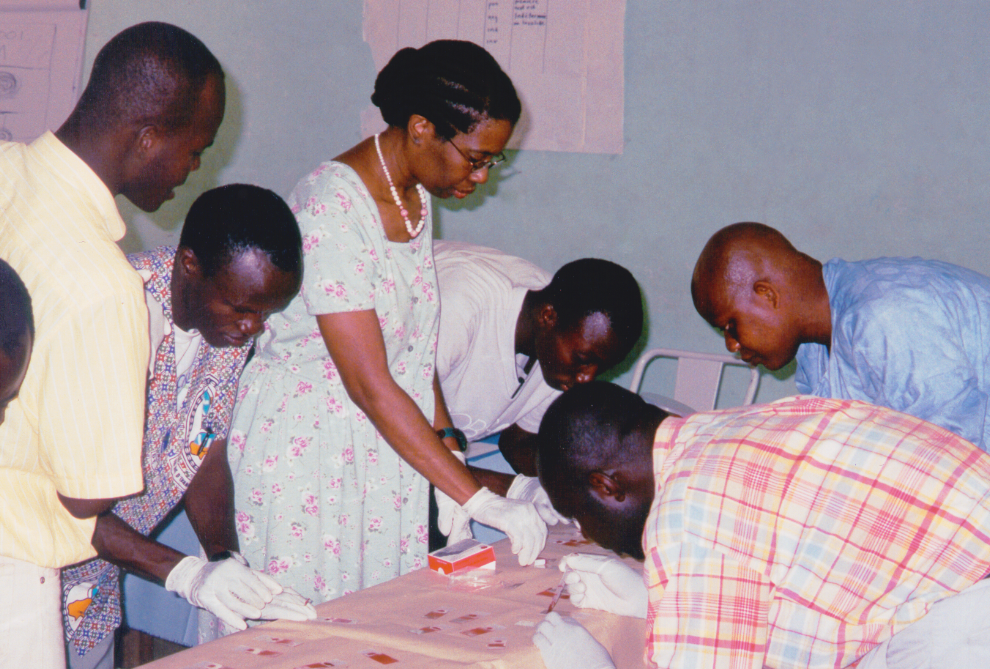
In 2001, Gail Stennies, M.D. journeyed to Burkina Faso as part of the Centers for Disease Control and Prevention's "Rapid Assessment of Malaria in Pregnancy" project.

Events in the year 2001 in Burkina Faso.

== Incumbents ==
- President: Blaise Compaoré
- Prime Minister: Paramanga Ernest Yonli

== Events ==
- December – The summit meeting of ECOWAS was set to convene with President Konare of Mali as executive chairman.
