= 2009 in Burkina Faso =

- Decades: 1980s; 1990s; 2000s; 2010s; 2020s
- See also: Other events of 2009; Timeline of Burkinabé history

Events in the year 2009 in Burkina Faso.

== Incumbents ==
- President: Blaise Compaoré
- Prime Minister: Tertius Zongo

== Events ==
=== June ===
- June–September – Several rivers throughout the country flooded, causing 150,000 people flee their homes, mostly in the capital Ouagadougou.
- June 26 – The Ruins of Loropéni were added to the list of UNESCO World Heritage Sites. The Ruins were the second out of three total sites in Burkina Faso to be added to the list, and was the country's first cultural UNESCO site.

=== September ===
- September 8 – The IFC invested $2 million into the mining economy of Burkina Faso for exploration of natural resources.

=== October ===
- October 1 – Burkina Faso's government designates 12 areas of interest as Ramsar Sites.
