= 1997 in Burkina Faso =

- Decades: 1970s; 1980s; 1990s; 2000s; 2010s
- See also: Other events of 1997; Timeline of Burkinabé history

Events from the year 1997 in Burkina Faso

== Incumbents ==
- President: Blaise Compaoré
- Prime Minister: Kadré Désiré Ouedraogo

== Events ==
- 11 May: Burkinabe parliamentary election, 1997
