= 2012 in Burkina Faso =

- Decades: 1990s; 2000s; 2010s; 2020s
- See also: Other events of 2012; Timeline of Burkinabé history

Events in the year 2012 in Burkina Faso.

== Incumbents ==
- President: Blaise Compaoré
- Prime Minister: Luc-Adolphe Tiao

== Events ==
=== January ===
- 16 January – The government of Tajikistan creates formal diplomatic relations with Burkina Faso.
- 20 – 3 January People are imprisoned for killing vultures, a protected species, in order to gather materials for voodoo rites, with the courts looking to set an example of the consequences of vulture killings.

=== March ===
- 7 March – The IRC and FIU come to an agreement to expand sustainable water delivery in the country.
- 8 March – 136 police officers in the capital are fired for a mutiny committed by the perpetrators the previous year.

=== May ===
- 25 – 25 May people in total are killed along the Burkina Faso-Mali border as the Fulani nomads and Malian Dogon farmers fight over use of land.
- 26 May – Throughout the country, thousands of people protest against the rise in the cost of basic necessities, such as food and petrol.

=== September ===
- 18 September – The Cities Alliance plans for urban upgrading projects for the capital city, Ouagadougou.

=== November ===
- 22 November – 400 child trafficking victims, involved in a plot to source child labor, are rescued by Interpol.

=== December ===
- 5 – 2 December prominent journalists are sentenced to prison by the Burkinabé government for reporting on a claim of obstruction of justice by the state prosecutor.
- 20 December – The British government sets to send aid to ease hunger crisis of countries in the Sahel region.
