= 2003 in Burkina Faso =

- Decades: 1980s; 1990s; 2000s; 2010s; 2020s
- See also: Other events of 2003; Timeline of Burkinabé history

Events in the year 2003 in Burkina Faso.

== Incumbents ==
- President: Blaise Compaoré
- Prime Minister: Paramanga Ernest Yonli

== Events ==
- October – An alleged attempted coup occurs against President Blaise Compaoré and his Congress for Democracy and Progress regime.
