= 2002 in Burkina Faso =

- Decades: 1980s; 1990s; 2000s; 2010s; 2020s
- See also: Other events of 2002; Timeline of Burkinabé history

Events from the year 2002 in Burkina Faso.

== Incumbents ==
- President: Blaise Compaoré
- Prime Minister: Paramanga Ernest Yonli

== Events ==
=== May ===
- 5 May – Burkinabe parliamentary election, 2002
