= Burkinabes in the United States =

Burkinabés in the United States
- (Burkina Faso) (United States)
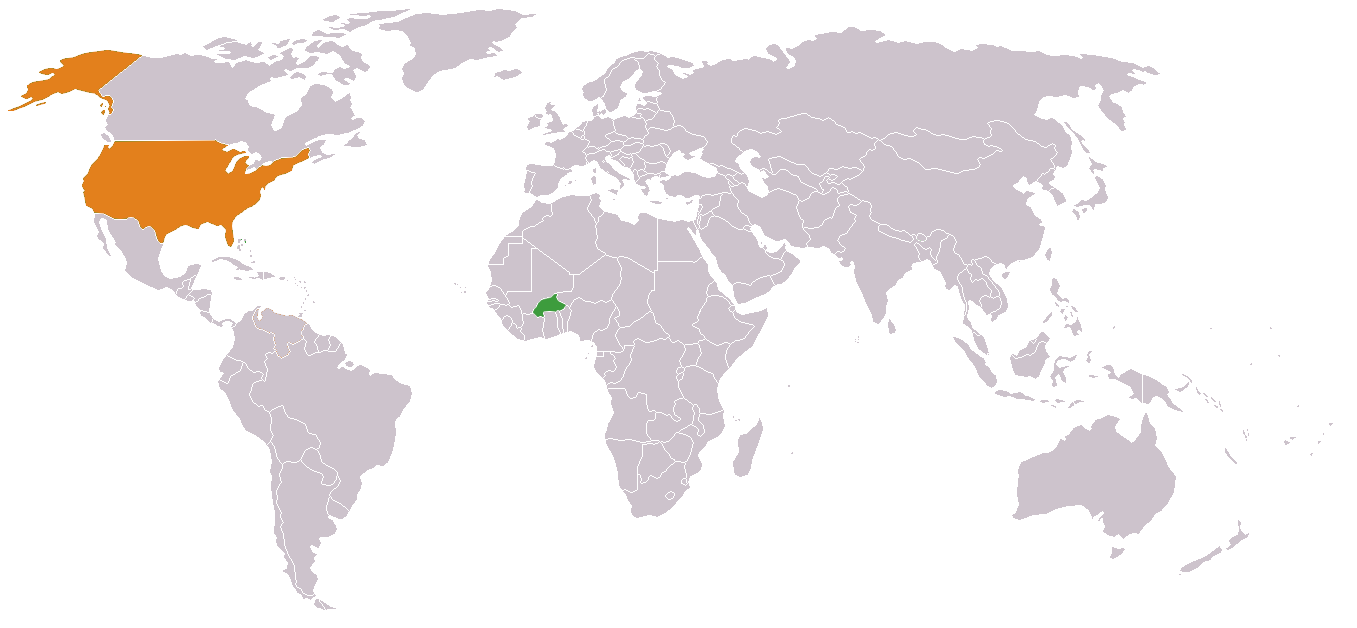

Regions with significant populations
- New York City, Washington, D.C., Houston, Atlanta, Minneapolis

Languages
- French, English, Mooré, Dioula and other languages of Burkina Faso

Religion
- Predominantly Islam and Christianity; also traditional beliefs

Burkinabés in the United States are people born in Burkina Faso or of Burkinabé ancestry living in the United States. The community emerged from broader migration patterns shaped by Burkina Faso's historical role as a labor-sending country within West Africa and the later diversification of migration toward intercontinental destinations. While most Burkinabé migration has traditionally remained within Africa, smaller flows to North America (Canada and the US) developed in the late twentieth and early twenty-first centuries, largely driven by higher education, professional opportunities, and family reunification. These migrants typically maintain transnational ties with Burkina Faso through community organizations, cultural initiatives, and remittance networks.

== History ==
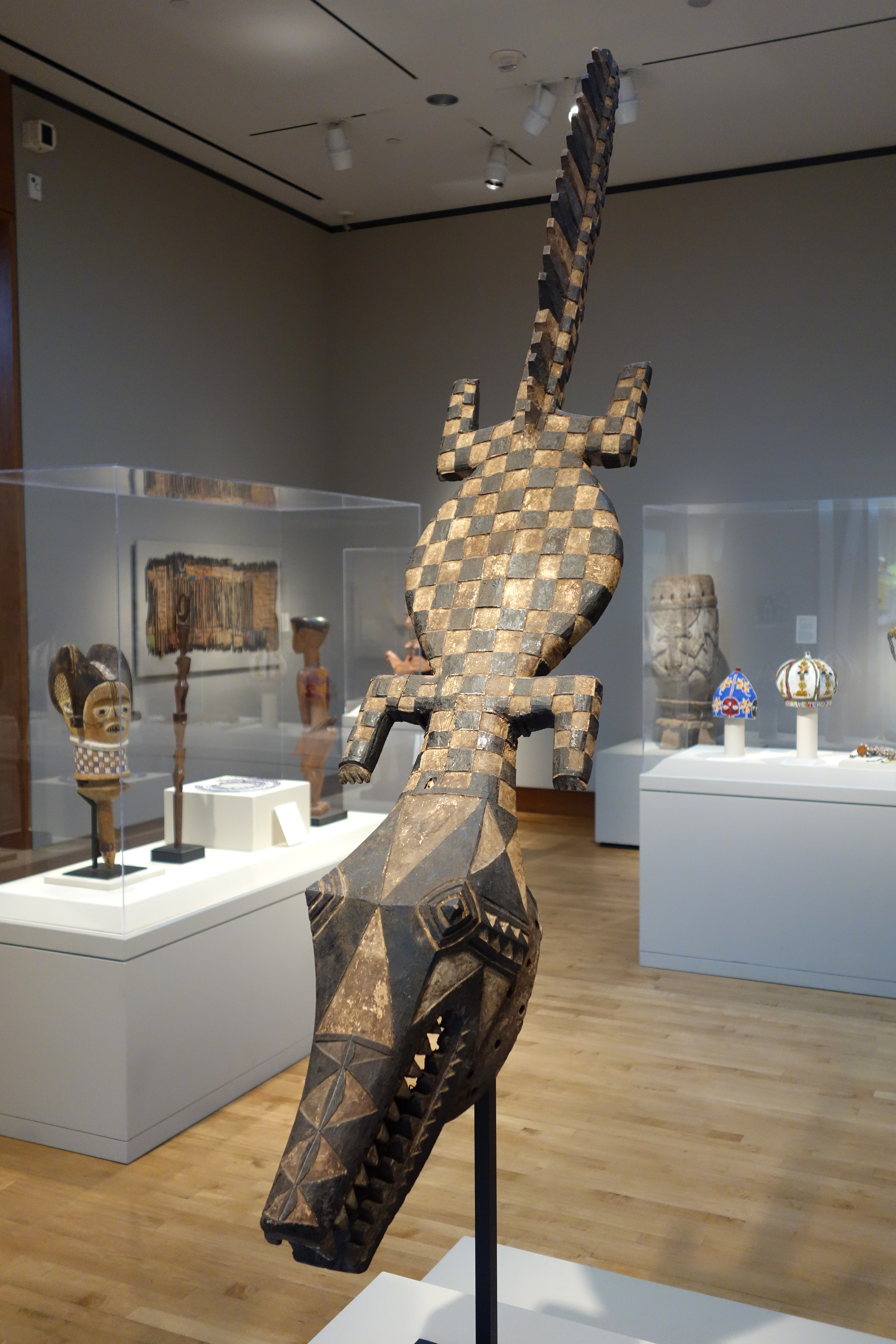
Male crocodile mask from the Nuna people of southern Boromo, Burkina Faso, early 20th century, displayed at the Chazen Museum of Art in Madison, Wisconsin

Migration from present-day Burkina Faso is rooted in long-standing mobility patterns shaped by colonial labor systems and later intercontinental migration. During French colonial rule, the territory known as Upper Volta became a major migrant-sending region. Colonial authorities relied on its population for labor recruitment, directing workers primarily to agricultural zones in the Gold Coast (modern Ghana) and later to Côte d'Ivoire. These movements created large-scale regional migration systems that dominated mobility from Upper Volta throughout the early and mid-twentieth century.

Because these colonial migration systems were overwhelmingly intra-African, overseas migration remained limited during this period. Intercontinental migration expanded mainly after independence in 1960, when economic downturns, declining regional opportunities, and growing education levels encouraged migrants to seek destinations outside Africa. Scholars note that migration destinations gradually shifted “from within to outside the continent,” with increasing flows toward Europe and North America supported by education, transportation, and diaspora networks.

From the late twentieth century onward, Burkinabé migration diversified beyond traditional West African corridors. Smaller numbers of migrants began moving to North America, including the United States, typically as students, skilled professionals, and through family reunification. These movements reflected broader African migration dynamics in which higher education abroad, labor demand in destination countries, and network effects contributed to the formation of new diaspora communities.

In the twenty-first century, migration to North America has remained relatively small but increasingly structured around educational pathways. Many Burkinabé migrants initially travel to the United States as students and later seek employment and long-term settlement, particularly those with English-language skills that facilitate academic and professional integration. Burkinabé diaspora communities in the United States maintain transnational ties through remittances, professional networks, and community associations, reflecting a shift from predominantly regional labor migration toward voluntary intercontinental mobility driven by education, career opportunities, and expanding diaspora networks.

Some Burkinabé migrants in the United States have settled within broader Francophone West African communities, particularly in New York City’s “Little Senegal” (Le Petit Sénégal) in Harlem. The neighborhood developed as a hub for French-speaking migrants from Senegal and neighboring countries, including Burkina Faso, where shared language and cultural ties facilitated housing, employment opportunities, and community support networks for newcomers.

== Sociocultural organizations ==
Burkinabé communities in the United States have established sociocultural and professional organizations that promote mutual support, cultural preservation, and transnational engagement with Burkina Faso. These include student networks, diaspora associations, and local community groups that organize cultural events, mentoring initiatives, and fundraising activities.

The Burkinabé Student Network (RE Burkina), founded in 2017, connects students from Burkina Faso studying in the United States and provides academic support and community-building activities. The Union of the Diaspora Burkinabé of the United States (UDB-USA) functions as a nonprofit organization aimed at strengthening solidarity and supporting socio-professional integration, while community-based initiatives such as BurkinaBe In Action (BBIA) promote cultural awareness and professional networking.

In addition to nationwide initiatives, local associations operate in cities such as Washington, D.C., New York, New Jersey, and Houston, where they organize cultural activities and provide support to newcomers. Together, these organizations help maintain transnational ties through community engagement, remittances, and development initiatives linking the diaspora with Burkina Faso.

In 2023, the Burkinabé diaspora in the United States contributed financially to initiatives in Burkina Faso through coordinated fundraising campaigns. A community drive launched in late 2022 mobilized more than US$82,000, equivalent to about 48.6 million CFA francs, which was transferred to the Burkinabé public treasury to support national efforts. The campaign brought together diaspora associations, religious communities, NGOs, and individual contributors, illustrating the role of Burkinabé organizations in maintaining transnational ties through remittances and collective initiatives.

== Notable people ==
- Marie-Ange Somdah (born 1959), poet and writer
- Georgie Badiel (born 1985), model
- Ousseni Bouda (born 2000), footballer

== See also ==
- African immigration to the United States
- Burkinabe diaspora
- Burkina Faso–United States relations
- African diaspora
