= 2006 in Burkina Faso =

- Decades: 1980s; 1990s; 2000s; 2010s; 2020s
- See also: Other events of 2006; Timeline of Burkinabé history

Events in the year 2006 in Burkina Faso.

== Incumbents ==
- President: Blaise Compaoré
- Prime Minister: Paramanga Ernest Yonli

== Events ==
=== June ===
- June – Medications such as praziquantel and ivermectin are distributed across the country to aide in prevention of intestinal parasites and related diseases.

=== November ===
- November – WAEMU provides wells to Burkina Faso for access to clean water to prevent diseases from entering the water supply.

=== December ===
- December – The country cancels a regional economic summit following clashes between soldier and police at Ouagadougou.
