= 1999 in Burkina Faso =

- Decades: 1970s; 1980s; 1990s; 2000s; 2010s
- See also: Other events of 1999; Timeline of Burkinabé history

Events in the year 1999 in Burkina Faso.

== Incumbents ==
- President: Blaise Compaoré
- Prime Minister: Kadré Désiré Ouédraogo

== Events ==
- June – A general strike is held to protest government economic policies and alleged human rights violations.
