= 1992 in Burkina Faso =

- Decades: 1970s; 1980s; 1990s; 2000s; 2010s
- See also: Other events of 1992; Timeline of Burkinabé history

Events from the year 1992 in Burkina Faso

== Incumbents ==
- President: Blaise Compaoré
- Prime Minister: Youssouf Ouédraogo (from 16 June)

== Events ==
=== May ===
- 24 May – Burkinabe parliamentary election, 1992

== Births ==
- 2 December: Jonathan Sundy Zongo, footballer
