= Burkina Faso–United States relations =

- Burkina Faso: United States

Historically strong during the Cold War, relations between Burkina Faso and the United States have been subject to strain in recent years since the ascension to power of the Traoré government due to its alleged human rights abuses and democratic backsliding as well as its alignment with Russia and criticism of perceived western interference in the region.

According to the 2012 U.S. Global Leadership Report, 82% of Burkinabès approve of U.S. leadership, with 17% disapproving and 1% uncertain, the third-highest rating of the U.S. for any surveyed country in Africa. By 2024, this had declined to 53% approve, 31% disapprove and 17% uncertain.

== Diplomatic Relations ==
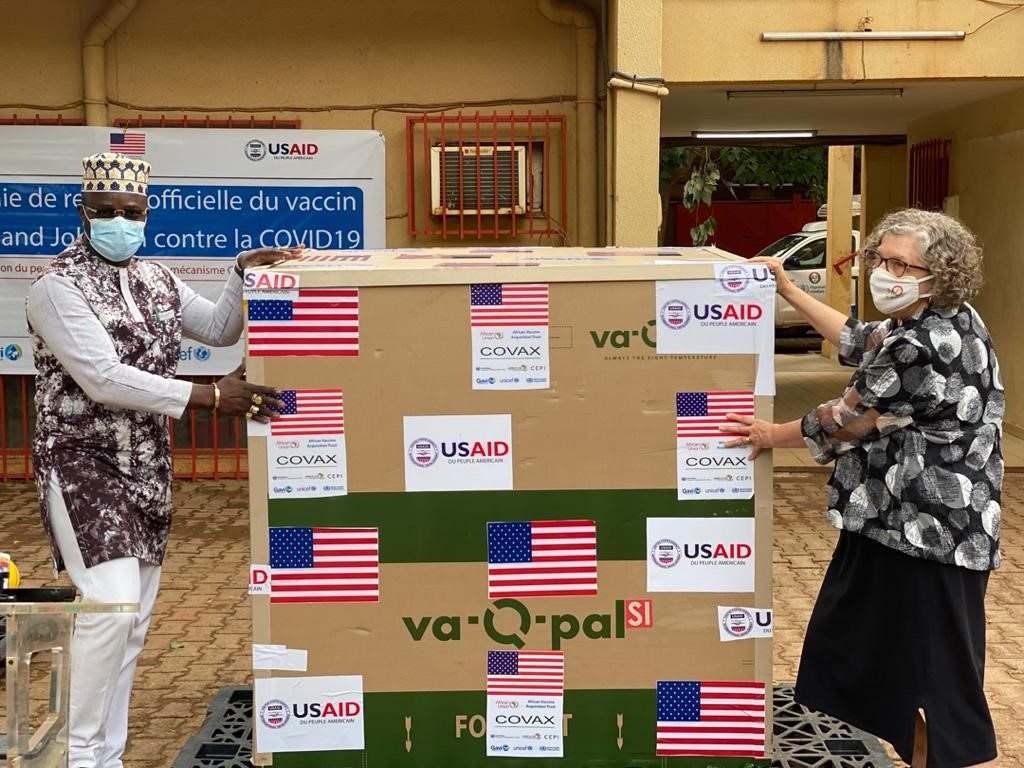
The US delivers Janssen COVID-19 vaccines as part of the COVAX program in 2021

The U.S. established diplomatic relations with Burkina Faso in 1960, following its independence from France. During the tenure of Blaise Compaoré, Washington viewed the country through the prism of regional stability. Later, under the African Growth and Opportunity Act (AGOA), Burkina Faso enjoyed trade preferences that boosted cotton exports and economic ties. Security cooperation expanded in the 2000s, as Burkina Faso became a partner in the US-led Trans-Saharan Counterterrorism Initiative.

However, since the September 2022 Coup, and ascension of president Ibrahim Traoré the US suspended most military programs and stripped Burkina Faso of AGOA eligibility. During his tenure, Traoré has increasingly distanced Burkina Faso from France and ECOWAS, particularly by kicking out their troops, and has also increasingly aligned Burkina Faso with Russia, Turkey, China, as well as Mali and Niger.

In April 2025, General Michael Langley, commander of the U.S. Africa Command in a speech before the U.S. Senate, accusing the Burkinabè leader of corruption, using the nation’s gold for personal ends, and helping Russia and China establish an imperial foothold in Africa. Traore responded to the allegations by asserting they were “false” and “unacceptable”. That month, the Burkinabe government claimed to have foiled a 'major plot' to overthrow Traoré nd alleged the plotters to be based in neighbouring Ivory Coast. In Ouagadougou, thousands of people rallied in support of the government and to denounce General Langley’s accusations. In October 2025, the United States suspended issuance of visas in its Ouagadougou embassy. The act was decried by foreign affairs minister Karamoko Jean-Marie Traoré with the minister asking if the embassy's decision was "blackmail" related to his rejection of a US proposal to take in migrants from third countries.

On February 25, 2026, the United States signed a five-year memorandum on health cooperation. The deal provides up to $147 million in healthcare aid to the country over the next five years. The United States has signed similar deals with 16 other African countries as of March 2026. They are part of a larger drive by the Trump administration to procure bilateral aid agreements that differ from the multilateral approach taken by the World Health Organization and differ from traditional USAID delivery method. Another goal was to improve relations with Burkina Faso. In this vein, senior official of the Bureau of African Affairs of the U.S. State Department, Nick Checker, visited Ouagadougou and met with the Burkinabe Minister of Foreign Affairs, Karamoko Jean-Marie Traoré, on March 11, 2026. The two agreed to pursue a partnership between their countries based on mutual respect with the goal of fighting instability in the region and resuming the export of American arms to Burkina Faso.

== Humanitarian Aid ==
Although the Agency for International Development (USAID) closed its office in Ouagadougou in 1995, in late May 2013 it sent a representative to re-open an Office under its Mission in Senegal. Under a combination of regional and bilateral aid programs, USAID provided approximately $50 million annually to Burkina Faso's development through non-governmental and regional organizations. The largest is a Food for Peace school lunch program administered by Catholic Relief Services. Burkina Faso has been the site of several development success stories. U.S. leadership in building food security in the Sahel after the 1968-74 drought has been successful in virtually eliminating famine, despite recurrent drought years. River blindness has been eliminated from the region. In both cases, the U.S. was the main donor to inter-African organizations headquartered in Ouagadougou which through sustained efforts have achieved and consolidated these gains. In 2005, Burkina Faso and the Millennium Challenge Corporation (MCC) signed a $12 million Threshold Country Program to build schools and increase girls' enrollment rates. In November 2005, the Millennium Challenge Corporation selected Burkina Faso as eligible to submit a proposal for Millennium Challenge Account assistance for fiscal year 2006, making it one of only two countries eligible for threshold as well as compact funding. The Government of Burkina Faso is working closely with MCC staff to finalize its compact submission.

The Peace Corps entered Burkina Faso in 1966. The Peace Corps program was phased out in 1987, but was invited to return to Burkina Faso in 1995 as part of a newly established health project. One year later, the Peace Corps established a secondary education project and in 2003, Peace Corps introduced a small enterprise development project to complement the government's poverty reduction and private sector promotional programs. In 2005, the Government of Burkina Faso asked for assistance to increase the level of girls' access to education, which later became the focus of the Millennium Challenge Corporation's Threshold Compact with Burkina Faso. All Peace Corps Volunteers, regardless of sector, are trained in how to promote awareness on HIV/AIDS and Gender and Development.

U.S. trade with Burkina Faso totalled $220 million in U.S. exports and $600,000 in Burkinabé exports to the U.S. in 2004.

== Principal U.S. Officials ==
- Ambassador — Joann M. Lockard
- USAID Representative — James C. Parys

== Diplomatic missions ==
The U.S. Embassy in Burkina Faso is located in Ouagadougou.

== See also ==
- Foreign relations of Burkina Faso
- Foreign relations of the United States
- List of ambassadors of Burkina Faso to the United States
- Burkinabes in the United States
