= Apollinaire J. Kyélem de Tambèla =

Interim Prime Minister of Burkina Faso from 2022 to 2024

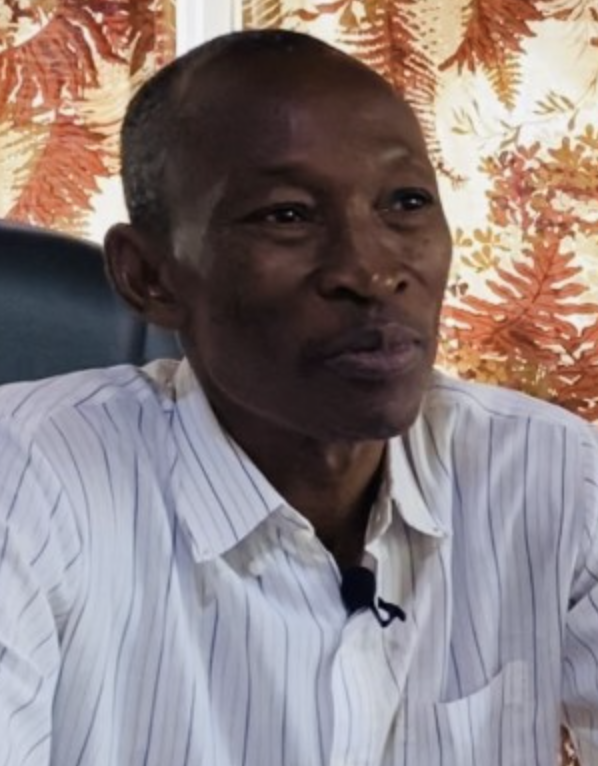
- Kyélem in 2022

Interim Prime Minister of Burkina Faso
- Interim
- In office 21 October 2022 – 6 December 2024
- President: Ibrahim Traoré
- Preceded by: Albert Ouédraogo
- Succeeded by: Jean Emmanuel Ouédraogo

Personal details
- Born: 11 June 1955 (age 71) Ganzourgou Province, French Upper Volta (now Burkina Faso)
- Party: Independent

Apollinaire Joachim Kyélem de Tambèla (French: [apolinɛʁ ʒoakim kjelɛm də tɑ̃bɛla]; born 11 June 1955) is a Burkinabe lawyer, pan-Africanist, writer and statesman, who served as the Prime Minister of Burkina Faso from October 2022 until his firing by President Ibrahim Traoré in December 2024.

== Early life and education ==
Kyélem de Tambèla was born in Burkina Faso in 1955. After completing his early education in Burkina Faso, he went on to study in France, where he received his doctorate of law in 1986 from the University of Nice. He taught as a professor at the University of Ouagadougou and the National School of Administration and Magistrates (ENAM).

== Political career ==
As a student in France in the 1980s, Tambèla founded a branch of the Committee for the Defense of the Revolution (CDR) in Nice, Côte-d’Azur to defend and financially support the revolutionary struggle abroad waged by Thomas Sankara. During this period, he also organized with left-wing groups: The National Union of Students of France (UNEF) and the Union of Communist Students. Prior to entering politics, Tambèla built a career as a lawyer and later as a television personality. He gained popularity among the public due to his outspoken nature and strong criticism of governmental excesses.

On 21 October 2022, he was appointed interim prime minister by interim president Ibrahim Traoré. Shortly after his appointment, one of Prime Minister Kyélem de Tambèla’s first actions was to call for a reduction in the salaries of the president and various ministers. This was in alignment with the reforms of the Sankara government, which he had previously stated his commitment to by declaring, “I have already said that Burkina Faso cannot be developed outside the path set by Thomas Sankara."

== Prime minister ==
In 2022, Kyélem de Tambèla was unexpectedly appointed as the prime minister of Burkina Faso by President Captain Ibrahim Traoré. Despite having neither a political party nor a political formation behind him, Kyélem de Tambèla accepted the role.

For his first foreign visit as prime minister, he traveled to Russia. The information leaked despite all precautions. He also visited recently Iran upon an invitation from Iran's first vice-president, Mohammad Mokhber. There, he met with Iranian foreign minister Ali Bagheri to discuss the enhancement of ties between Iran and Burkina Faso.

His second foreign visit took him to neighboring Mali, a country similarly ruled by a military junta following the coup d'états in 2020 & 2021. During this visit, he suggested that the two countries form a 'federation'. On 6 December 2024, he was removed as Prime Minister by Traoré.

== Personal life ==
Tambèla is also an author of books on the culture and politics of Burkina Faso, and is known nationwide for having been a presenter on the private television channel BF1 TV, on the programs Press Échos and 7 Infos. He was also responsible for programs on radio stations such as Rádio Liberté, Savane FM and Horizon FM. Details about Kyélem de Tambèla's personal life are limited. He is known for his polemicist personality. and is a supporter of Thomas Sankara.

== See also ==
- Politics of Burkina Faso
- List of political parties in Burkina Faso
- List of prime ministers of Burkina Faso

Political offices
Preceded by Albert Ouédraogo	Prime Minister of Burkina Faso; 2022–2024	Succeeded by Jean Emmanuel Ouédraogo
