= Albert Ouédraogo =

Interim Prime Minister of Burkina Faso in 2022

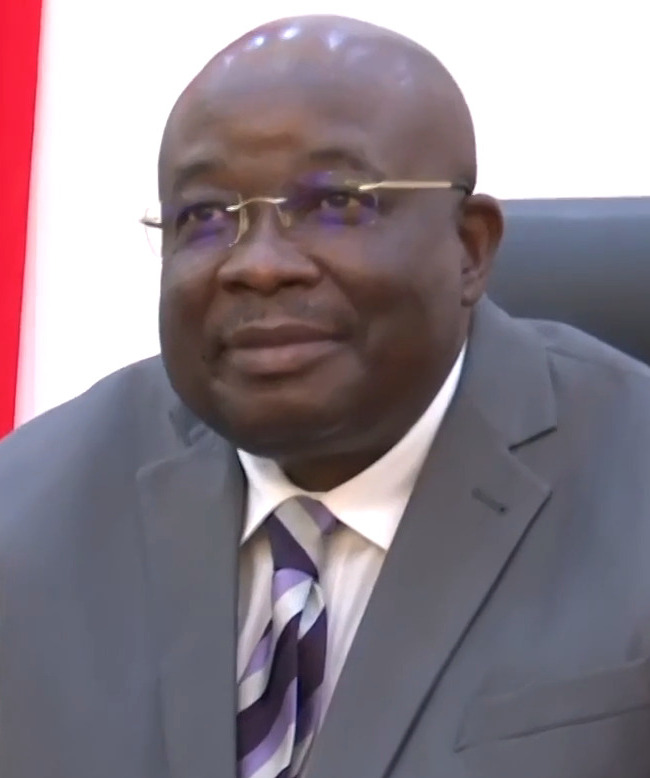
- Ouédraogo in 2022

Interim Prime Minister of Burkina Faso
- In office 3 March 2022 – 30 September 2022
- President: Paul-Henri Sandaogo Damiba
- Preceded by: Lassina Zerbo
- Succeeded by: Apollinaire J. Kyélem de Tambèla

Personal details
- Born: 6 April 1969 (age 57) Dori, Séno, Upper Volta (now Burkina Faso)

Albert Ouédraogo (born 6 April 1969) is a Burkinabé politician and economist who served as the interim prime minister of Burkina Faso from 3 March to 30 September 2022.

== Early life and education ==
Albert Ouédraogo was born on 6 April 1969, in Dori, Séno. He studied partly at the Prytanée militaire de Kadiogo before continuing his education at the University of Ouagadougou, where he was excluded from studies during the 1990s for leading a student strike. He holds a doctorate in management science.

== Career ==
Albert Ouédraogo has taught in several public and private universities in Burkina Faso. In particular, Ouédraogo taught accounting at the University of Ouagadougou as well as at the private university Aube Nouvelle.

He also consults businesses on management and economics.

He was appointed as prime minister by President Paul-Henri Sandaogo Damiba on 3 March 2022, following his official inauguration. His term as prime minister ended following the September 2022 Burkina Faso coup d'état.

== Personal life ==
Ouédraogo is close friends with Pierre Claver Damiba, the president of the West African Development Bank from 1975 to 1981, and the uncle of former Burkinabé President Paul-Henri Sandaogo Damiba.

Ouédraogo is married and has 2 children.

Political offices
Preceded by Lassina Zerbo	Prime Minister of Burkina Faso; 2022	Succeeded by Apollinaire Joachim Kyélem de Tambèla
