= 1993 in Burkina Faso =

- Decades: 1970s; 1980s; 1990s; 2000s; 2010s
- See also: Other events of 1993; Timeline of Burkinabé history

Events in the year 1993 in Burkina Faso.

== Incumbents ==
- President: Blaise Compaoré
- Prime Minister: Youssouf Ouédraogo

== Events ==
- 27 August – The Party for Democracy and Rally was founded by Daouda Bayili of the African Independence Party.
