= 1995 in Burkina Faso =

- Decades: 1970s; 1980s; 1990s; 2000s; 2010s
- See also: Other events of 1995; Timeline of Burkinabé history

Events in the year 1995 in Burkina Faso.

== Incumbents ==
- President: Blaise Compaoré
- Prime Minister: Michel Kafando

== Events ==
- The Nazi Boni University opens as the Polytechnic University of Bobo-Dioulasso.
