= Le Petit Sénégal =

Neighborhood of Manhattan in New York City

Coordinates: 40°48′14.22″N 73°57′15.15″W

Le Petit Sénégal, or Little Senegal, is a neighborhood in the New York City borough of Manhattan consisting of a large West African immigrant community. Though referenced as Le Petit Sénégal in The New York Times as early as 2005, current West African residents do not use the name for their neighborhood.

Le Petit Sénégal is a smaller section of the much larger, and older, neighborhood of Harlem. The neighborhood's exact borders are difficult to define as it is still new, growing from nonexistent in 1985 to 6,500 by 2005. Le Petit Sénégal is generally defined as located in Central Harlem. The neighborhood's main streets are the blocks surrounding West 116th Street between Lenox Avenue / Malcolm X Boulevard on the east and Frederick Douglass Boulevard to the west.

Le Petit Sénégal is the main shopping and social area for many of Harlem's West African immigrants. The majority of these recent immigrants hail from French-speaking Senegal, reflecting the French local name of Little Senegal. However, West African languages, such as Wolof, are also spoken. There are also immigrants from other West African countries, including Côte d'Ivoire, Guinea, Mali, Gambia, and Burkina Faso.

West African shops, restaurants, bistros, bakeries, cafes, and other proprietorships can be found in the neighborhood.

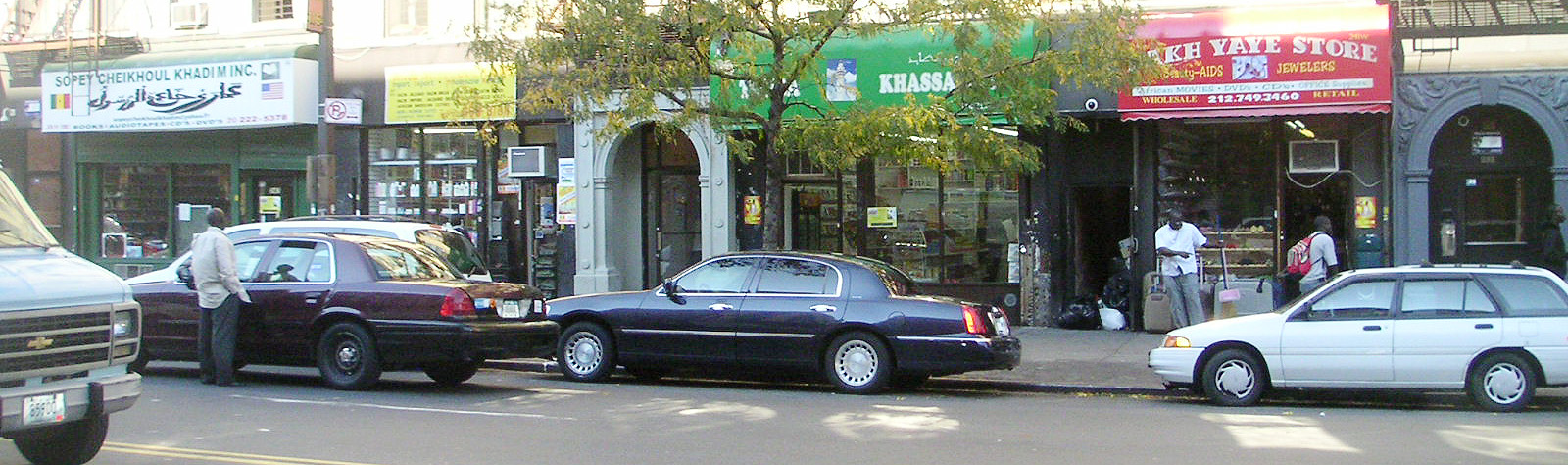
Stores along 116th Street between 7th and 8th Avenues (Adam Clayton Powell Jr Bl. and Frederick Douglass Bl., respectively)
