= 2019 Burkina Faso government resignation =

Government crisis

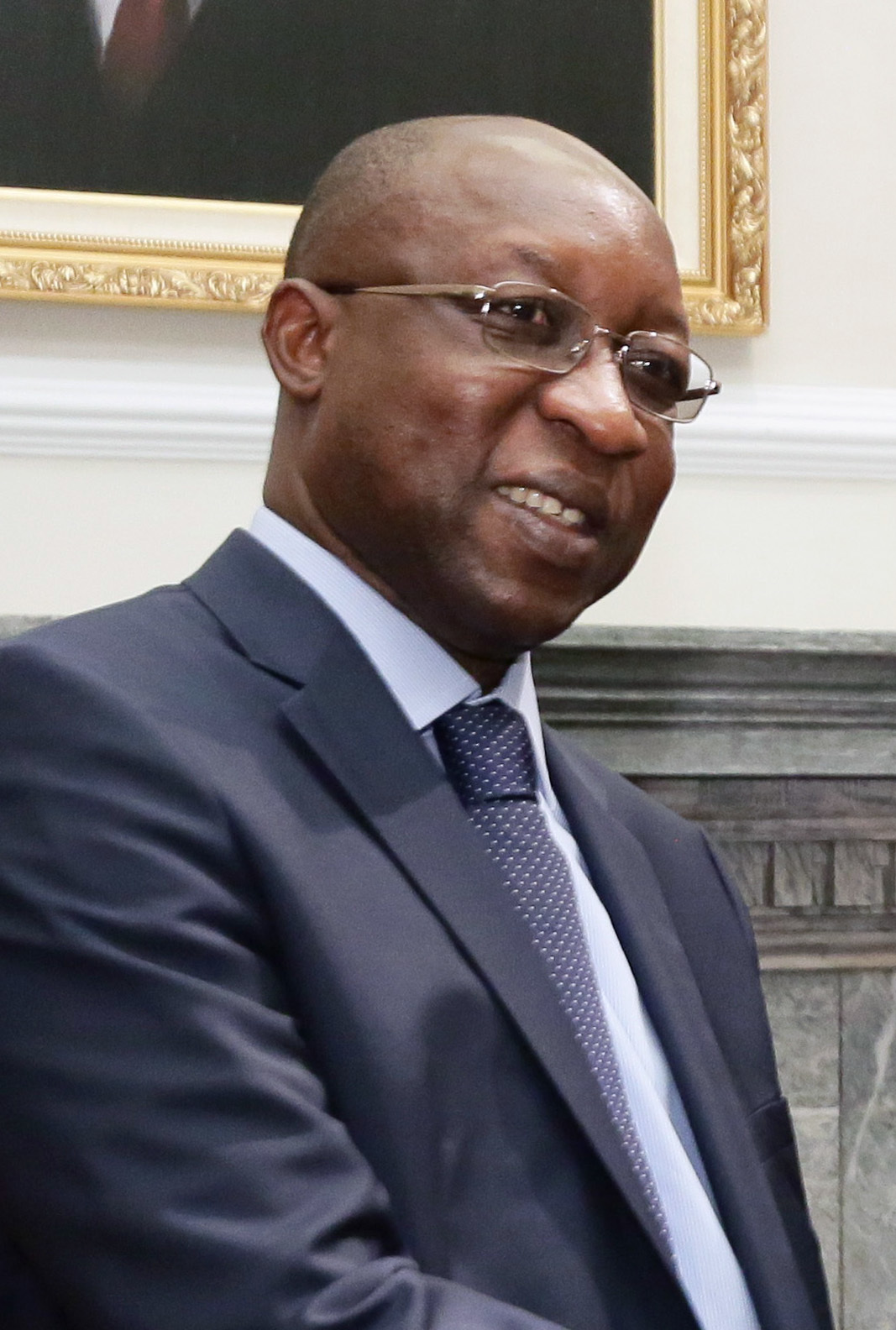
- Paul Kaba Thieba
- Date: January 18, 2019
- Location: Burkina Faso
- Type: Government resignation

On 18 January 2019, the government of Burkina Faso dissolved due to the resignation of Prime Minister Paul Kaba Thieba and all members of his cabinet. President of Burkina Faso Roch Marc Christian Kaboré announced that he intends to form a new government; on 21 January, he began the process of appointing a new government by naming Christophe Joseph Marie Dabiré as the new prime minister, but his cabinet remains vacant. In the days leading up to the resignation of the government, the country faced a number of attacks from militant terrorist groups, and opposition members of government had previously called for the prime minister and defense ministries to step down, citing an inability to address terrorist attacks.

== Background ==
The resignations were announced on television by President Kaboré, but his announcement did not state any reasons for why his government resigned. Northern provinces of the country, particularly ones bordering Mali and Niger, have been in a state of emergency since 31 December, following a rise in jihadist attacks. In the week preceding these resignations, Burkina Faso's government extended the state of emergency for an additional six months in regions where terror attacks were reoccurring. According to the ACLED, at least 200 militant attacks were suspected throughout the country – including southern and western provinces – from 1 January 2018 to 12 January 2019. It is estimated that violence in the northern provinces has displaced at least 54,000 people since 2016. At least 60 attacks were confirmed by the ACLED to have happened in the country's eastern provinces since February 2018.

=== Attacks on the French Embassy and Burkinabé Army headquarters ===
In the capital city Ouagadougou on Friday, 2 March 2018, jihadists initiated a coordinated attack against France's embassy to Burkina Faso as well as the Burkina Faso army headquarters. Eight were killed and more than 80 wounded. Burkina Faso security forces later killed all eight militants involved. French authorities were alerted once gunfire began, and French citizens in the area were told to stay inside. Windows were shattered at the Burkinabé Army headquarters and heavy smoke could be seen from the army chief of staff's office in Ouagadougou, with explosions being reported around the area. The United Nations condemned the attacks and United Nations Secretary-General António Guterres requested that the nations of the world work to "promote national reconciliation and create the conditions for sustainable peace and development" in Burkina Faso. French President Emmanuel Macron spoke with the Burkinabé President to express his condolences.

=== Kidnapping and murder of Canadian nationals ===
Days before the government resigned, it was confirmed by officials that a Canadian geologist, Kirk Woodman, was abducted and killed at a mine exploration camp in the country's northern provinces near the border with Mali. He was the second Canadian national to be killed in the country within a span of weeks. The Foreign Ministry of Canada condemned the attacks and stated that it will work with the government of Burkina Faso to pursue those responsible, and the Foreign Ministry of Burkina Faso stated that it will open an investigation. The Security Ministry of Burkina Faso believes that Islamist militants from outside of the country are responsible. Other Canadian nationals in Burkina Faso, including Edith Blais and her Italian partner Luca Tacchetto, have been known to be missing since December. Canadian Prime Minister Justin Trudeau stated that to the best of his knowledge, Blais is still alive, and that Canadian authorities are working to gain information about her disappearance in Burkina Faso. In response to these abductions, Canada has issued travel warnings for Burkina Faso, warning of banditry and kidnappings. The United States issued a similar warning the same day, advising against travel to Burkina Faso's northern and eastern provinces. In the interests of public safety, Burkina Faso's government imposed a curfew in Orodara from 19 to 23 January, citing severe threats of terrorism and kidnappings.

== Announcement of resignation ==
On the afternoon of 18 January, Prime Minister Paul Kaba Thieba submitted to the President his resignation, as well as the resignation of his cabinet. President Kaboré reportedly "accepted the resignation" and expressed "all his gratitude to Prime Minister Paul Kaba Thieba and all its ministers for their commitment to the service of the nation". In the months leading up to the resignation, opposition ministers have requested the resignation of the Prime Minister, as well as the resignation of those in charge of the security and defense of the country. The President announced that he intends to form a new government in the near future, but his televised announcement of the resignations did not include an explanation for why his government resigned.

On Monday, 21 January, President Kaboré begun forming a new government by naming Christophe Joseph Marie Dabiré, once a health minister under former president Blaise Compaore, as the country's Prime Minister. The new government has not yet been named, and the cabinet remains vacant as of 21 January. Dabiré had also represented Burkina Faso at the West African Economic and Monetary Union. He was appointed by presidential decree. Secretary-General Stéphane Sanou announced the appointment via television.
