= Jean Emmanuel Ouédraogo =

Interim Prime Minister of Burkina Faso since 2024

His Excellency Jean Emmanuel Ouédraogo
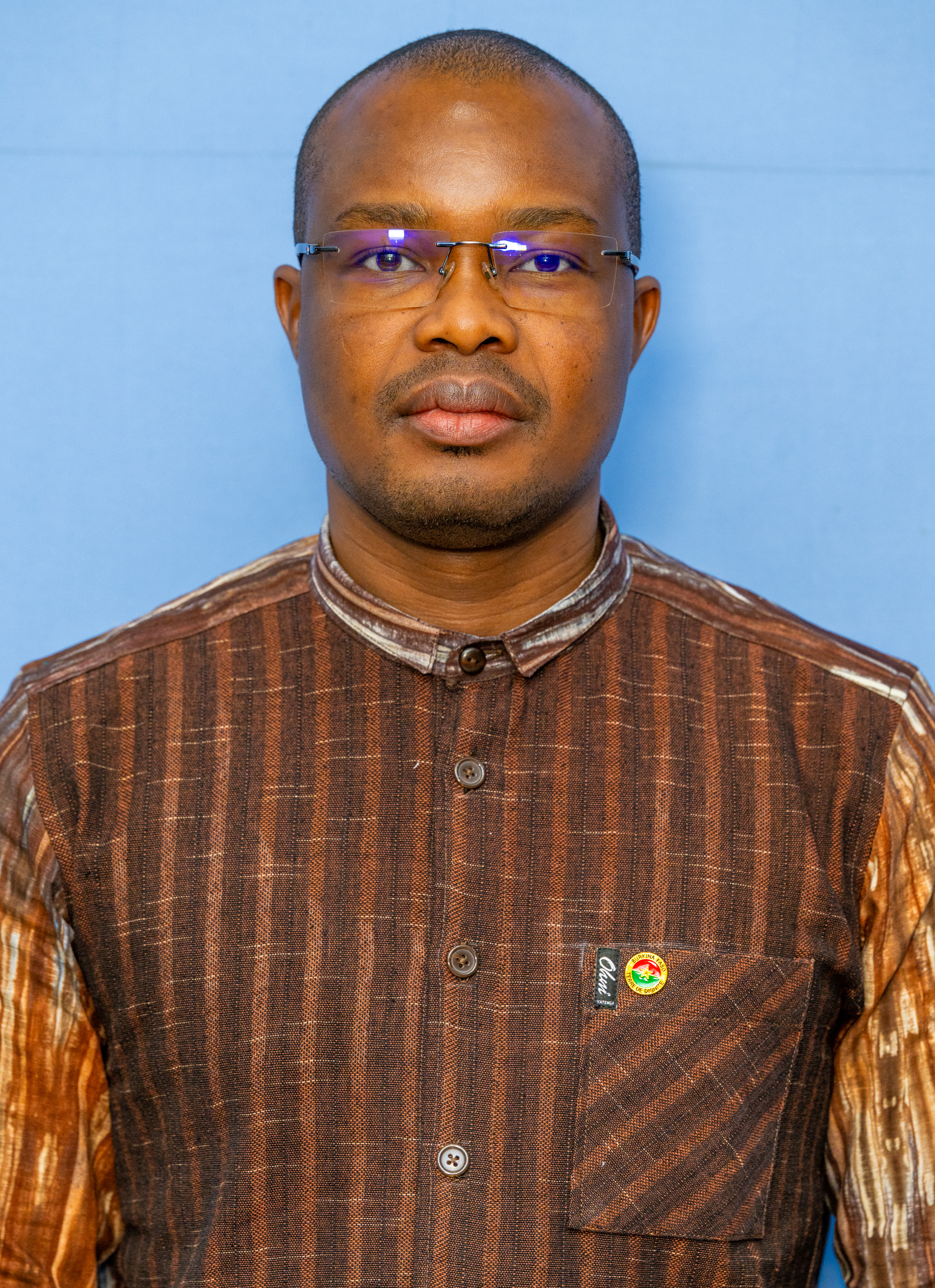
- Ouédraogo in 2026

Prime Minister of Burkina Faso
- Interim
- Assumed office 7 December 2024
- President: Ibrahim Traoré (interim)
- Preceded by: Apollinaire J. Kyélem de Tambèla (interim)

Minister of Communication
- In office 25 October 2022 – 6 December 2024
- Prime Minister: Apollinaire J. Kyélem de Tambèla
- Preceded by: Valérie Kaboré
- Succeeded by: Pingdwendé Gilbert Ouedraogo

Minister of Culture, Arts, and Tourism
- In office 25 October 2022 – 6 December 2024
- Prime Minister: Apollinaire J. Kyélem de Tambèla
- Preceded by: Valérie Kaboré
- Succeeded by: Pingdwendé Gilbert Ouedraogo

Personal details
- Born: Rimtalba Jean Emmanuel Ouédraogo; 26 December 1980 (age 45) Ouagadougou, Burkina Faso
- Party: Independent
- Education: University of Ouagadougou

Rimtalba Jean Emmanuel Ouédraogo (born 26 December 1980) is a Burkinabé journalist, presenter and politician who has been serving as the interim prime minister of Burkina Faso since 2024. He previously was the Minister of Communication and the Minister of Culture, Arts, and Tourism in the government of Apollinaire J. Kyélem de Tambèla from 2022 to 2024.

== Biography ==
Ouédraogo studied at the University of Ouagadougou, obtaining a baccalaureate in sociology, and a master's degree in mediation and conflict management. Ouédraogo completed the exam for the Institute of Technology and Information Sciences in 2006.

Ouédraogo worked as the editor-in-chief, then director of Radio Télévision du Burkina from 2016 to 2021. He hosted several shows, including "Sur la Brèche".

== Political career ==
Following the September 2022 Burkina Faso coup d'état, Ouédraogo was appointed to the post of Communication, Culture, Arts, and Tourism, and was made the spokesperson of the Apollinaire J. Kyélem de Tambèla government from 2022 to 2024. As the minister of Communication, Ouédraogo was responsible for the suspension of several French radio and TV outlets, including Radio France Internationale, Jeune Afrique, and Le Monde. France 24 was specifically suspended for airing an interview with Abu Ubaidah Youssef al-Annabi, the leader of Al-Qaeda in the Islamic Maghreb, of which the government of Burkina Faso is at war with.

Following the December 2023 cabinet reshuffle, Ouédraogo was also made one of the government's ministers of state.

Ouédraogo was appointed to the post of prime minister on 7 December 2024 after President Ibrahim Traoré dissolved the previous government on 6 December 2024.

== Awards ==
On 8 December 2023, Ouédraogo was awarded the Order of the Stallion.
