= 1994 in Burkina Faso =

- Decades: 1970s; 1980s; 1990s; 2000s; 2010s
- See also: Other events of 1994; Timeline of Burkinabé history

Events in the year 1994 in Burkina Faso.

== Incumbents ==
- President: Blaise Compaoré
- Prime Minister: Youssouf Ouédraogo (until 22 March), Roch Marc Christian Kaboré (from 22 March)

== Events ==
- March 2 – 18 – Charles L. Abernethy visits the country to write a report for the International Irrigation Management Institute.
