= Ministry of Communication (Burkina Faso) =

The Ministry of Communication and Relations with Parliament (French: Ministère de la Communication et des Relations avec le Parlement, Porte - parole du gouvernement) is a ministerial department of the government in Burkina Faso. The minister serves as the Government Spokesperson The ministry in charge of communication is headquartered in Ouagadougou. The ministry is responsible for communication, relations with parliament and conveys the government's message .

== Ministers ==
- Ousséni Tamboura (January 10, 2021– January 24, 2022)
- Valérie Kaboré (March 5, 2022 - 25 October 2022)
- Jean Emmanuel Ouédraogo (25 October 2022 – 6 December 2024)
- Pingdwendé Gilbert Ouedraogo Ousséni Tamboura (since 8 December 2024)
