= Barsalogho aid convoy attack =

2020 ambush in Burkina Faso

- Part of Jihadist insurgency in Burkina Faso
- Location: near Barsalogho Department, Sanmatenga Province, Burkina Faso
- Date: May 30, 2020
- Target: Aid convoy returning from Foube
- Deaths: 13
- Injuries: 40
- Victim: 6 gendarmes missing
- Perpetrator: Unknown jihadists

On May 30, 2020, unknown militants ambushed an aid convoy escorted by Burkinabe gendarmes near the town of Barsalogho as it was returning from delivering food to civilians in Sanmatenga Province, Burkina Faso. Thirteen people were killed and forty others were wounded in the attack.

== Background ==
Three main jihadist groups are known to operate in northern Burkina Faso, having conducted attacks on civilians and Burkinabe government forces since the jihadist insurgency began in 2015. These three main groups are the al-Qaeda-aligned Jama'at Nasr al-Islam wal Muslimin and Ansarul Islam, and the Islamic State in the Greater Sahara. These groups mainly operate in rural areas, and ambush from roadsides, and are active in Barsalogho Department and the wider Sanmatenga Province.

On the weekend of May 28 through May 31, jihadists attacked various locations across Burkina Faso. Fifteen people were killed in an attack on a trader convoy in Loroum Province, near the Malian border, by unknown gunmen on May 28. On the same day as the Barsalogho attack, twenty-five people were killed at a cattle market in Kompienga Province in southern Burkina Faso.

== Attack ==
The aid convoy was returning from the refugee camp in the village of Foube when it was ambushed by unknown gunmen near the town of Barsalogho. At the time of the attack, the convoy was also protected by Burkinabe gendarmes. The Burkinabe government stated that ten people were killed in the aftermath, with twenty others injured and some gendarmes missing. Of the ten killed, five were gendarmes, and five were aid workers, including an ambulance driver and a nurse. The aid workers belonged to the International Committee of the Red Cross. This toll later increased to thirteen people killed, and forty wounded. Six gendarmes were also reported missing by the Burkinabe government in the revised toll.

No group claimed responsibility for the attacks.
