= 1990 in Burkina Faso =

- Decades: 1970s; 1980s; 1990s; 2000s; 2010s
- See also: Other events of 1990; Timeline of Burkinabé history

Events in the year 1990 in Burkina Faso.

== Incumbents ==
- President: Blaise Compaoré

== Events ==
- President Blaise Compaoré presents minor democratic reforms in response to an alleged coup during the previous year.
