= Nagraogo massacre =

- Part of Jihadist insurgency in Burkina Faso
- Location: Nagraogo and Alamou, Barsalogho Department, Burkina Faso
- Date: January 20, 2020
- Target: Mossi civilians
- Deaths: 36: 32 in Nagraogo; 4 in Alamou
- Perpetrator: Fulani militants in Jama'at Nasr al-Islam wal Muslimin

On January 20, 2020, jihadists from Jama'at Nasr al-Islam wal-Muslimin attacked the Mossi-majority villages of Nagraogo and Alamou, Barsalogho Department, Burkina Faso, killing 36 civilians.

== Background ==
Since 2019, northern Burkina Faso has been embroiled in two jihadist insurgencies by the Islamic State in the Greater Sahara and Jama'at Nasr al-Islam wal-Muslimin, both predominantly-Fulani organizations that attack civilians along ethnic and religious lines. The Burkinabe government has increased efforts to combat the insurgencies by recruiting civilian militias known as the Volunteers for the Defense of the Homeland (VDP), although Burkinabe forces and VDP have been accused of killing Fulani civilians en masse.

The villages of Nagraogo and Alamou are located seven kilometers apart on the road between Barsalogho and Dablo. Both villages are Mossi-majority, although several years earlier Fulani residents were evicted from the area by Mossi landowners. Residents of the villages became worried when Fulani-majority jihadist groups like JNIM attacked the villages of Nawoubkiba and Koglobaraogo in Namissiguima Department, but had faith that government security forces would protect them.

== Massacre ==
Twenty minutes before the massacre, a convoy of government troops passed through Nagraogo. Residents of the village initially assumed that the jihadists, who rode up on motorcycles, were remnants of the convoy until they started shooting civilians. Survivors of the massacre said that the perpetrators communicated in Fulfulde. The perpetrators burned the market of Nagraogo as well. 32 people were killed in Nagraogo, and four were killed in Alamou. Most of the victims were Mossi, although three Fulani were possibly killed.

== Aftermath ==
President Roch Marc Christian Kaboré declared two days of national mourning in response to the massacre. Pope Francis condemned the attack as well. Five days later, JNIM militants attacked a church in Silgadji, killing at least 39 people.
