= Marie-Ange Somdah =

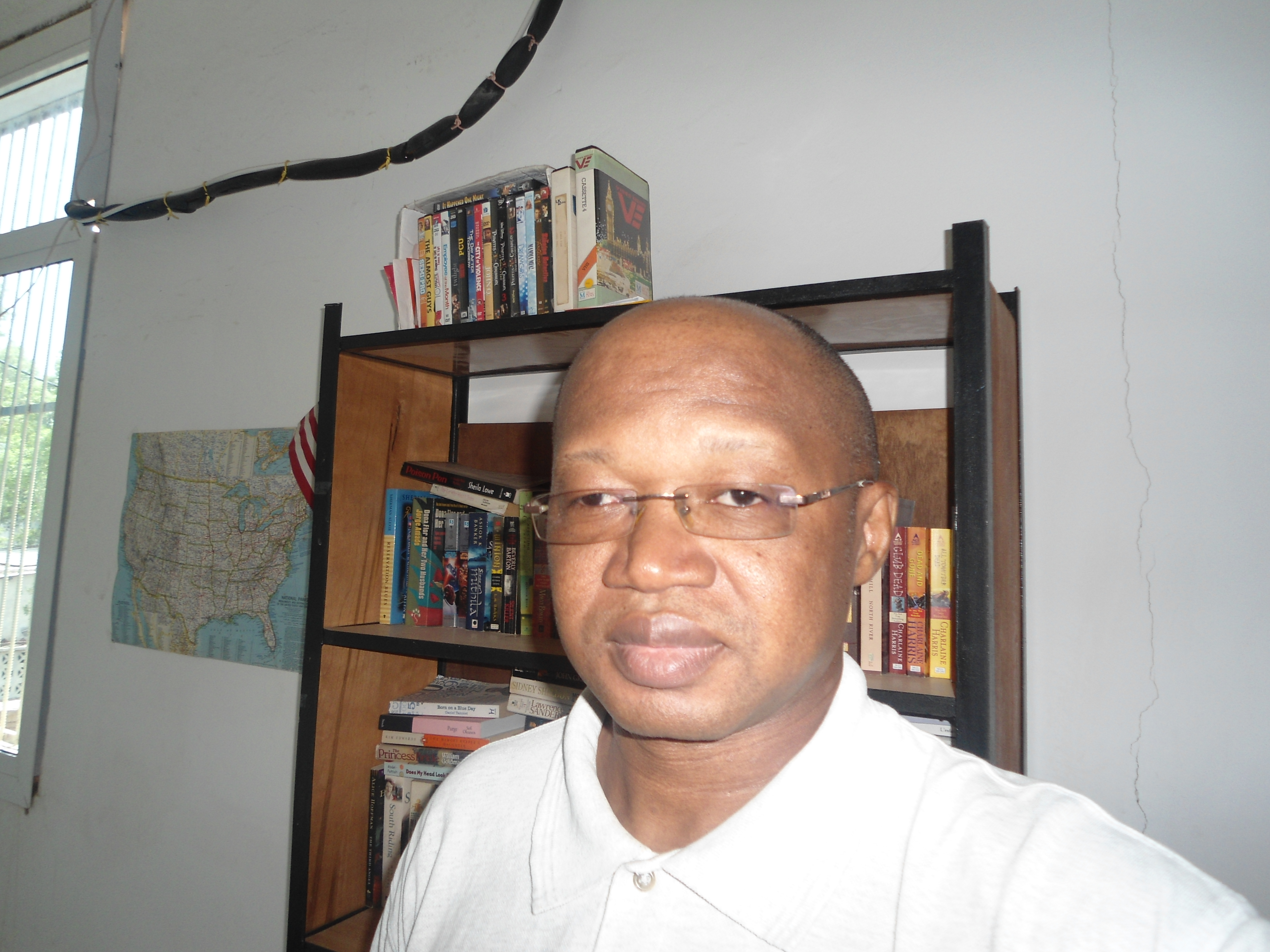
Marie-Ange Somdah, Author from Burkina Faso

Marie-Ange Somdah (born October 19, 1959) is a Burkinabe poet and writer based in Boston. He is also known for his works in international development with organizations such as IFESH.

== Life ==
Born in Burkina Faso, Marie-Ange Somdah grew up in a family of eight children. When he was in primary school years, he started drawing with his young brother. During his middle school years in the seminary of Nasso in Bobo-Dioulasso, his passion for reading brought him to writing through songs. His skills of observation continued sharpening during his high school years at Lycée Newton of Ouagadougou. Understanding the importance of reading, observation, and imagination set Marie-Ange towards a future of writing he felt during his undergraduate years at the University of Ouagadougou in Burkina Faso. Moving to study in France will give him the opportunity to set the stage for a career in writing. While studying at the University of Franche-Comté, he helped run a local magazine, Couleur Locale, in Besançon, in the North-East of France. Some of his early works were published in Couleur Locale. His first book, Demain sera beau, came out shortly before the defence of his Ph.D. thesis.

Marie-Ange Somdah holds a Ph.D. in French, African, and Comparative Literatures from University de Franche-Comté. He is also an alumnus of Boston University School of Education. Marie-Ange is a bilingual writer using both French and English as medium for his numerous published works of fiction and research. Somdah has also made significant contributions in the academic world, Ecritures du Burkina Faso (Harmattan, 2003)).

== Achievements ==
Somdah twice won the IFESH TFA award in 1998 and 2007 for his volunteering works in Benin and Djibouti. He is currently the Country Representative of IFESH in Djibouti. IFESH is an American INGO working in Africa on various Education programmes.

To help the younger generation sharpen its writing skills, Somdah has run various creative workshops. In 2010, he published Pen & Dreams from My Students, a collection of poetry works from three of his students, through his own publishing company, part of an effort to trigger emulation among his students at the University of Djibouti. Somdah is also a member of various academic organizations in the USA such as MLA, CIEF, ALA, ASA.

== Works ==
His creative works include:

- Le Nombril de la terre (L’Harmattan, 1994),
- Seeds and Deep Seasons (Mellen Press, 1997),
- Un Soleil de Plomb (Harmattan, 2003),
- Hotel La Desirade & autres récits (Le Manuscrit, 2005)
- Libertés, chocolat et Cie (Le Manuscrit, 2005),
- Un long fleuve (Le Manuscrit, 2005)),
- Images de vie (Le Manuscrit, 2005)),
- Rêves de savane (Yaniyo ! Books, 2002).
- Pen & Dreams from My Students (Yaniyo ! Books, 2013)
- Te Amo (Yaniyo ! Books, 2013)

== Bibliography ==
- Seeds & Deep Seasons. Boston: Yaniyo! Books, 2006.
- Libertés, chocolat & cie. Paris : Ed. Le Manuscrit, 2005.
- Images de vie. Paris : Ed. Le Manuscrit, 2005.
- Un long fleuve. Paris : Ed. Le Manuscrit, 2005.
- Hôtel la Désirade & autres récits. Ed. Le Manuscrit, 2005.
- Un Soleil de Plomb. Paris: L’Harmattan, 2003.
- Ecritures du Burkina Faso. Paris: L’Harmattan, 2003.
- Identités Postcoloniales & Discours dans les Cultures Francophones. Paris: L’Harmattan, 2003.
- Rêves de Savane. Boston: Yaniyo! Books, 2002.
- Campus Blues. Paris: Nouvelles du Sud, 1998.
- Le Nombril de la terre. Paris: L'Harmattan, 1994.
- Adjoa, l'Aurore. Besançon: Couleur Locale, 1992.
- Demain sera beau. Paris: Silex, 1989.

== Interviews on TV and Radio ==
- RTB (Burkina Faso National) TV with Fousseini Kindo (August 2010)
- Interview Lefasonet.
- RTB (Burkina Faso National TV) for the show Parentheses (August 1997)
- BNN Channel 3, Boston, 1994–1997
- France 3 Bourgogne, Emission Ah le beau monde!, Dijon, France, 1992
- Les 5èmes Rencontres Littéraires de Dijon, Dijon, France, 1992
