= 1991 in Burkina Faso =

- Decades: 1970s; 1980s; 1990s; 2000s; 2010s
- See also: Other events of 1991; Timeline of Burkinabé history

Events in the year 1991 in Burkina Faso.

== Incumbents ==
- President: Blaise Compaoré

== Events ==
- 1 December – Presidential elections were held in the country.
