= Valérie Kaboré =

Burkinabé film director

- Born: 31 December 1965 (age 60); Bouaké
- Citizenship: Burkina Faso
- Occupations: Film director, Politician

Valerie Kaboré (born 1965) is an Ivorian-born Burkinabé film director and politician in the national government of Burkina Faso.

== Biography ==
She was born in Bouaké in the Ivory Coast (Côte d'Ivoire).

She studied film at the Institut Africain d'études cinématographiques (INAFEC) of the University of Ouagadougou, then received a master's degree, and worked on a doctoral dissertation.

== Directing career ==
She started a film production company called Media 2000 in 1991. The company worked for the national television station of Burkina Faso and non-governmental organizations such as UNESCO.

Many of her films question clichéd views of African society, with a particular focus on women's rights, including standing against early pregnancy and school segregation by gender. She has described her work as dealing with heavy themes but with comedic "elements" to "get the message across more easily."

== Political career ==
She worked as the general secretary of the national chamber of commerce and industry of Burkina Faso in 2016.

In March 2022, she became the minister of communication, culture, arts and tourism of Burkina Faso. In July 2022, Kaboré encouraged her fellow Burkinabès to support President Paul-Henri Sandaogo Damiba's "dialogue process" following the January 2022 coup d'état. She was also in charge of communications following the 2022 kidnap and release of a Polish national. She has spoken at UNESCO on the subject of cultural heritage.

Kaboré was succeeded by Jean Emmanuel Ouédraogo as the Minister of Communication and Culture, Arts, and Tourism, following the September 2022 coup d'état.

== Selected film and television work ==
- Born a girl in Africa - The bride was bearded (Naître fille en Afrique - La mariée était barbue) (1996), 51 minute creative documentary about women's rights and forced marriage
- Ina (2005), 25 minutes
- Ina, second season (2012), 25 minutes
