= Seydou Bouda =

Burkinabé politician

Seydou Bouda (born 31 December 1958) is a Burkinabé politician who has been Burkina Faso's Ambassador to the United States since 2011. Previously he served in the government of Burkina Faso as Minister of the Economy from 2002 to 2007, as Minister of the Civil Service from 2007 to 2008, and as Minister of Health from 2008 to 2011.

== Political career ==
Bouda was born in Poa, located in Boulkiemdé Province. An economist, he began working at the Ministry of Planning and Cooperation in 1986; later, he was Secretary-General of the Ministry of Employment, Labor and Social Security from 1991 to 1995, and in November 2000 he became Secretary-General of the Government and the Council of Ministers. In December 2001, he was awarded the title of Officer of the National Order.

Bouda was appointed to the government as Minister of the Economy and Development on 10 June 2002. Following the outbreak of the Ivorian Civil War in September 2002, Bouda said that "the eventual economic consequences of the crisis in Ivory Coast will be catastrophic to our country". He was retained as Minister of the Economy and Development in the government appointed on 6 January 2006.

In the May 2007 parliamentary election, Bouda was elected to the National Assembly as a candidate of the governing Congress for Democracy and Progress (CDP) in Boulkiemdé Province. On 10 June 2007, he was named as Minister of the Civil Service and State Reform. His portfolio was again changed on 3 September 2008, this time to Minister of Health, replacing Alain Bédouma Yoda.

Bouda was appointed as Ambassador to the United States in 2011. He arrived in the United States on 1 September 2011, a day after the departure of his predecessor, Paramanga Ernest Yonli, and presented his credentials on 9 September 2011.
