= Burkinabé constitutional referendum project =

A constitutional referendum has been planned to be held in Burkina Faso since 2019. Shortly before his reelection in November 2020, President Kaboré, who first initiated the project for a new constitution as part of his 2015 campaign, called for the referendum to be held in 2021. If approved, the new constitution would end the Fourth Republic created in 1991.

== Background ==
Following the 2014 uprising, the 2015 general elections were won by the People's Movement for Progress, which contested the elections with a manifesto promising a new constitution. President Roch Marc Christian Kaboré subsequently formed a Constitutional Commission in September 2016. An initial draft was published in January 2017 for public consultation. The Commission completed its work in November 2017 and presented the draft constitution to Kaboré.

The government had planned to have the new constitution approved by the National Assembly to avoid the cost of a referendum. However, opposition parties refused to give consent to parliamentary approval, resulting in a referendum being held.

Following a declaration of the Independent Electoral Commission, several media outlets announced the holding of the referendum on 24 March 2019. The date had however never been approved by the government; they denied that the date had been set the following day. Officials later reiterated the intention of the government to hold a referendum on the new constitution by 2020 at the latest. Considering the high cost of organisation and frequent terrorist attacks by jihadists, the government is considering holding this constitutional referendum at the same time as the 2020 presidential election. However, amidst the COVID-19 pandemic and controversy over the constitutional referendum in nearby Guinea, the plan to hold Burkina Faso's referendum alongside the 2020 elections did not materialize.

== New constitution ==
The new constitution provides for a semi-presidential system, although former National Assembly Speaker Salif Diallo had called for a parliamentary system. It introduces a two-term limit for the Presidency and Speaker of the National Assembly. It also recognises the right to participate in civil disobedience, clean water and housing, and abolishes the death penalty. Burkinabé citizens living abroad will be given the right to vote in presidential and parliamentary elections.

The Constitutional Council, which allowed former President Blaise Compaoré to ignore the previous constitution's term limits, will be replaced by a Constitutional Court, with the president's role in appointing members reduced to only two appointees. The High Court of Justice will also be abolished.

Several sections of the new constitution are non-amendable, including the presidential term limits.
