= 2007 United Nations Security Council election =

Election to the United Nations Security Council

- 16 October 2007

5 of 10 non-permanent seats on the United Nations Security Council
- United Nations Security Council membership after the election Permanent members Non-permanent members
- Outgoing members Republic of the Congo (Africa) Ghana (Africa) Qatar (Asia)^{a} Peru (GRULAC) Slovakia (EEG) a. Arab state Elected members Burkina Faso (Africa) Libya (Africa)^{a} Vietnam (Asia) Costa Rica (GRULAC) Croatia (EEG)

- Unsuccessful candidates
- Czech Republic (EEG)
- Dominican Republic (GRULAC)

The 2007 United Nations Security Council election was held on 16 October 2007 during the 62nd session of the United Nations General Assembly, held at UN Headquarters in New York City. The elections were for five non-permanent seats on the UN Security Council for two-year mandates commencing on 1 January 2008.

In accordance with the Security Council's rotation rules, whereby the ten non-permanent UNSC seats rotate among the various regional blocs into which UN member states traditionally divide themselves for voting and representation purposes, the five available seats were allocated as follows:

- Two for Africa (held by the Republic of the Congo and Ghana)
- One for Asia (held by Qatar)
- One for Eastern Europe (held by Slovakia)
- One for Latin America and the Caribbean (held by Peru)

The five members (elected by a two-thirds majority of the General Assembly, in as many rounds of voting as it takes to achieve that majority) served on the Security Council for the 2008–09 period.

Seven countries had announced themselves as candidates for the five non-permanent seats on the Security Council for the 2008–2009 term. Vietnam was running for the Asian seat, which if successful, would be the first time serving in the council. Burkina Faso (last served in 1985) and Libya (last served in 1977) were running for the two African seats. All three countries had received endorsements from their regional groupings. In addition, Costa Rica (last served in 1998) and the Dominican Republic (one of the few UN Charter members which had never served up to 2007) were competing for the one Latin American seat at stake. The Czech Republic (last served in 1995) and Croatia (never served) were competing for the Eastern European seat. Both Croatia and Vietnam were elected to the Council for the first time.

== Results ==
=== African and Asian States ===
Having been endorsed by their respective regional groups, Vietnam, Burkina Faso, and Libya were elected easily, winning 178, 185, and 183, votes, respectively, of a total of 190 possible; 190 ballot papers were distributed in the General Assembly, while there were 192 UN member states in 2007. Mauritania got two votes and Senegal got one, despite not having stood for election; there were no abstentions.

=== Eastern European Group ===
Eastern European Group election results
Member	Round 1	Round 2	Round 3
Croatia	95	106	184
Czech Republic	91	81	1
invalid ballots	-	1	-
abstentions	4	3	4
required majority	124	125	124
ballot papers	190	191	189

Before the third round of voting, the Czech Republic withdrew from the election.

=== GRULAC ===
GRULAC election results
Member	Round 1	Round 2	Round 3
Costa Rica	116	119	179
Dominican Republic	72	70	1
invalid ballots	-	1	-
abstentions	2	1	9
required majority	126	126	120
ballot papers	190	191	189

Before the third round of voting, the Dominican Republic withdrew from the election.

== See also ==
- List of members of the United Nations Security Council
- European Union and the United Nations
