= Luc-Adolphe Tiao =

Prime Minister of Burkina Faso

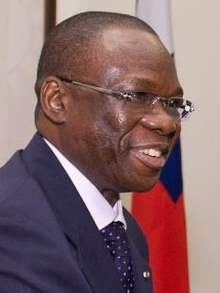
- Tiao in 2012

Prime Minister of Burkina Faso
- In office 18 April 2011 – 30 October 2014
- President: Blaise Compaoré
- Preceded by: Tertius Zongo
- Succeeded by: Yacouba Isaac Zida

Personal details
- Born: 4 June 1954 (age 72) Tenkodogo, Upper Volta (now Burkina Faso)
- Party: Congress for Democracy and Progress
- Education: University of Dakar; University of Ouagadougou

Luc-Adolphe Tiao (born 4 June 1954) is a Burkinabé politician and journalist who was Prime Minister of Burkina Faso from 2011 to 2014.

== Early life and career in journalism ==
Born at Tenkodogo, Tiao attended a seminary from 1969 to 1974 and studied to become a priest, but he abandoned that pursuit upon concluding that his left-wing views were incompatible with a career in the Church. He received degrees from the Center for Science and Information Technology Studies at the University of Dakar and the University of Ouagadougou. Working as a journalist, he earned a reputation for independence in his reporting. He edited Carrefour africain and was Director of Éditions Sidwaya from 1987 to 1990.

== Political career ==
Tiao was Secretary-General of the Ministry of Communication from August 1990 to August 1992 and press attaché at Burkina Faso's Embassy in France from November 1992 to August 1996. He was an adviser responsible for special duties at the Communication Department of the Prime Minister's Office from August 1996 to May 2001. Subsequently, he was President of the Higher Council for Information from May 2001 to May 2008. He was appointed as Burkina Faso's Ambassador to France on 2 May 2008, serving in that post until 2011.

Tiao was appointed as prime minister by President Blaise Compaoré on 18 April 2011, following protests by students, military personnel and police. In light of his background and lack of any experience as a government minister, his appointment was deemed surprising.

Following the December 2012 parliamentary election, Tiao submitted his resignation on 27 December 2012, and Compaoré reappointed him as prime minister on 31 December. The composition of Tiao's new government was announced on 2 January 2013.

Amidst violent protests, President Blaise Compaoré dissolved the government on 30 October 2014; Compaoré was forced to resign the next day, and the military took power. Subsequently, Tiao went into exile in Ivory Coast. He came back to Burkina Faso in September 2016 and was promptly arrested on 16 September on murder charges due to his alleged role in trying to suppress the protests.

Political offices
Preceded by Tertius Zongo	Prime Minister of Burkina Faso; 2011–2014	Succeeded by Yacouba Isaac Zida
