= Kadré Désiré Ouédraogo =

Burkinabé statesman

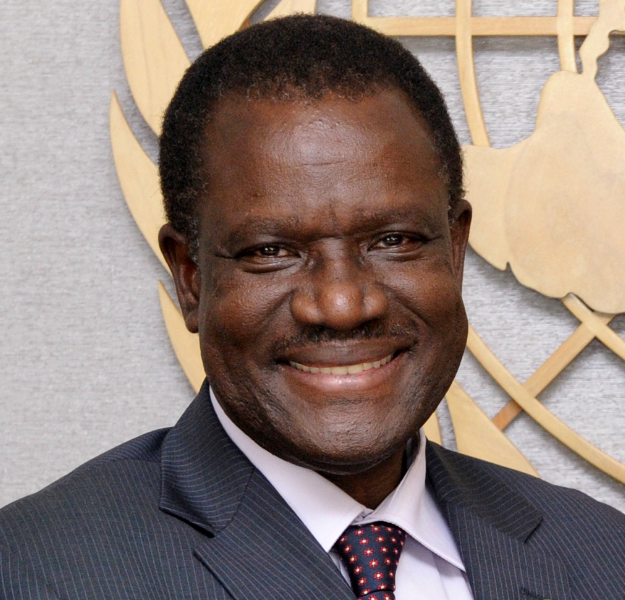
- Kadré Désiré Ouédraogo in 2012, in New York during a UN summit

President of the ECOWAS Commission
- In office 2012–2016
- Preceded by: James Victor Gbeho
- Succeeded by: Marcel Alain de Souza

Prime Minister of Burkina Faso
- In office 6 February 1996 – 7 November 2000
- President: Blaise Compaoré
- Preceded by: Roch Marc Christian Kaboré
- Succeeded by: Paramanga Ernest Yonli

Personal details
- Born: 1953 (age 72–73)
- Party: Mouvement AGIR Ensemble pour le Burkina Faso

Kadré Désiré Ouédraogo (born 31 December 1953 in Boussouma) is a Burkinabé statesman. He was the Prime Minister of Burkina Faso from 1996 to 2000 and Chairman of the Commission of the Economic Community of West African States (ECOWAS).

== Education and professional career ==
In 1972, Kadré Désiré Ouédraogo obtained the Baccalaureate series C (Mathematics and Physical Sciences) with honours at the Lycée Philippe Zinda Kaboré in Ouagadougou.

After studying higher mathematics in preparatory classes for the Grandes Ecoles at the Lycée du Parc in Lyon, France, he was simultaneously admitted in 1974 to the entrance examinations of five French Grandes Ecoles, including his eventual choice, the Ecole des Hautes Etudes Commerciales (HEC) in Paris, from which he graduated in 1977.

Kadré Désiré Ouédraogo also holds a bachelor's degree in General Economic Studies as well as a bachelor's degree in Economic Sciences from the University of Paris I (Panthéon-SORBONNE) with the distinction “Public Economy and Economic Policy”.

Returning to Burkina Faso at the end of his studies in France, Kadré Désiré Ouédraogo was hired in October 1977 as Economic Affairs Adviser at the Ministry of Trade and Industry.

Industrial development.

Kadré Désiré Ouédraogo taught for four years, between 1978 and 1984, the course in Analytical Accounting and Forecasting Management at the University of Ouagadougou (University Institute of Technology).

In 1980 he joined the ECOWAS (Economic Community of West African States) as a Financial Officer at the Financial Division of FOSIDEC in Ouagadougou.

In 1981 he was appointed Head of the Financial Division of FOSIDEC, a position he held until 1983 when he became Financial Advisor to the Secretary General of ECOWAS.

In July 1985 he was promoted to Deputy Executive Secretary in charge of Economic Affairs at ECOWAS in Lagos, Nigeria. He was then renewed in 1989 by the Council of Ministers of this organization.

In 1993, Kadré Désiré Ouédraogo was appointed Vice-Governor of the CBWAS (Central Bank of West African States) in Dakar, Senegal.

== Political background ==
On 6 February 1996, Mr. Kadré Désiré Ouédraogo was appointed Prime Minister, Head of Government of Burkina Faso, a post he held until 6 November 2000, after being successively reappointed after the legislative elections of May 1997 and the presidential elections of November 1998.

From September 1996 to June 1997, he was Minister of the Economy and Finance.

He was elected Member of the National Assembly of Burkina Faso in the legislative elections of May 1997.

From 2001 to 2011 Kadré Désiré Ouédraogo is Ambassador Extraordinary and Plenipotentiary of Burkina Faso in Brussels with jurisdiction over the Kingdom of Belgium, the Kingdom of the Netherlands, the Grand Duchy of Luxembourg, the Kingdom of Great Britain and Northern Ireland, and the Republic of Ireland. He is also Permanent Representative to the European Union, the International Organisation for the Prohibition of Chemical Weapons and, from 2001 to 2004, to the World Trade Organization (W.T.O.).

During his term as ambassador, he was chairman of the Organisation of African, Caribbean and Pacific States (OACPS) Committee of Ambassadors. During this period he chaired the Committee of Ambassadors and various working groups such as those on cotton or on the future of the OACPS groups. He also put his expertise to good use in the organization of the 6th Summit of OACPS Heads of State and Government which took place in Accra in 2008. In accordance with the provisions of the Cotonou Agreement, he also participated in sending OACPS missions to various countries (Chad, Djibouti and Mauritania).

From 2012 to 2016, Kadré Désiré Ouédraogo is President of the ECOWAS Commission at Abuja to Nigeria.

== Work with ECOWAS ==
In this role, he spoke out against the 2012 Malian coup d'état, calling it "a threat to the entire region".

== Distinctions ==
=== Grand Officer of the National Order and Grand Cross of Burkina Faso ===
Kadré Désiré Ouédraogo was elevated to the rank of Grand Officer of the National Order on 11 December 1996 then to the dignity of Grand Cross of the National Order on 8 December 2016 at Ouagadougou.

=== Commander of the Order of Merit of the International Military Sports Council ===
Kadré Désiré Ouédraogo received an honorary distinction as Commander of the Order of Merit of the International Council for Military Sport in 2000, at Ouagadougou.

=== Grand Officer of the National Order of Benin ===
Kadré Désiré Ouédraogo was raised to the rank of Grand Officer of the National Order of Benin in Cotonou on 24 October 2014.

=== Commander of the National Order of Senegal ===
Kadré Désiré Ouédraogo was raised to the rank of Commander of the National Order of Senegal in Dakar 18 February 2016.

=== Commander of the National Order of Ivory Coast ===
Kadré Désiré Ouédraogo was raised to the rank of Commander of the National Order of Ivory Coast on 17 March 2016 in Abidjan.

=== Commander of the National Order of Togo ===
Kadré Désiré Ouédraogo was raised to the rank of Commander of the National Order of Togo on 9 March 2016 in Lome.

== 2020 presidential elections ==
Following several messages and calls, Kadré Désiré Ouédraogo decided to respond to the various concerns of the Burkinabe people by running as a candidate in the presidential elections of 2020. In September 2020, Kadré Désiré Ouédraogo is officially invested by his party "Agir ensemble".

Political offices
Preceded by James Victor Gbeho	President of the ECOWAS Commission; 2012–2016	Succeeded by Marcel Alain de Souza
