= Tertius Zongo =

Prime Minister of Burkina Faso from 2007 to 2011

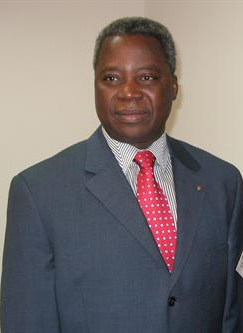

Prime Minister of Burkina Faso
- In office 11 June 2007 – 18 April 2011
- President: Blaise Compaoré
- Preceded by: Paramanga Ernest Yonli
- Succeeded by: Luc-Adolphe Tiao

Personal details
- Born: 18 May 1957 (age 69) Koudougou, Upper Volta (now Burkina Faso)
- Party: Congress for Democracy and Progress

Tertius Zongo (born 18 May 1957) was the Prime Minister of Burkina Faso from June 2007 to April 2011.

== Biography ==
Zongo was born in Koudougou. He has an extensive background in economics and accounting. He became Minister Delegate for Budget and Planning, under the Minister of the Economy, Finances, and Planning, in June 1995. In February 1996 he became Government Spokesman in addition to his role as Minister Delegate, and he remained Government Spokesman until November 2000. His portfolio was changed to that of Minister Delegate for Finance and Economic Development, under the Prime Minister, in September 1996; he was subsequently promoted to the post of Minister of the Economy and Finance on 10 June 1997. He remained in the latter position until November 2000. On 14 February 2002 he became Ambassador to the United States, serving in that post until he was named prime minister in June 2007.

Zongo also served as governor for Burkina Faso to the World Bank, the International Monetary Fund, the African Development Bank and the Islamic Bank of Development. In 1992, he worked as director general of Cooperation at the Ministry of Finances and Planning and as chief of the Department of Multilateral Cooperation from 1988 to 1992. He has also been a professor of accounting, business economy and financial analysis at the University of Ouagadougou in Burkina Faso. Zongo holds a master's degree in economic sciences from the Institut d'Administration des Entreprises in France.

== Prime minister ==
Following the May 2007 parliamentary election, Zongo was appointed prime minister by President Blaise Compaore on 4 June 2007. His government, composed of 34 members, was appointed on 10 June; its 34 members (excluding Zongo himself) included two ministers of state, 26 ministers, and six minister-delegates. Zongo took office as prime minister on 11 June, succeeding Paramanga Ernest Yonli.

Amidst serious unrest, Compaore appointed Luc-Adolphe Tiao to replace Zongo on 18 April 2011. Zongo was subsequently appointed to the Board of Directors of SEMAFO, a Canadian mining company with operations in Burkina Faso and other West African countries, in May 2012.

Political offices
Preceded by Paramanga Ernest Yonli	Prime Minister of Burkina Faso; 2007–2011	Succeeded by Luc-Adolphe Tiao
