= Paul Kaba Thieba =

Burkinabé politician and economist

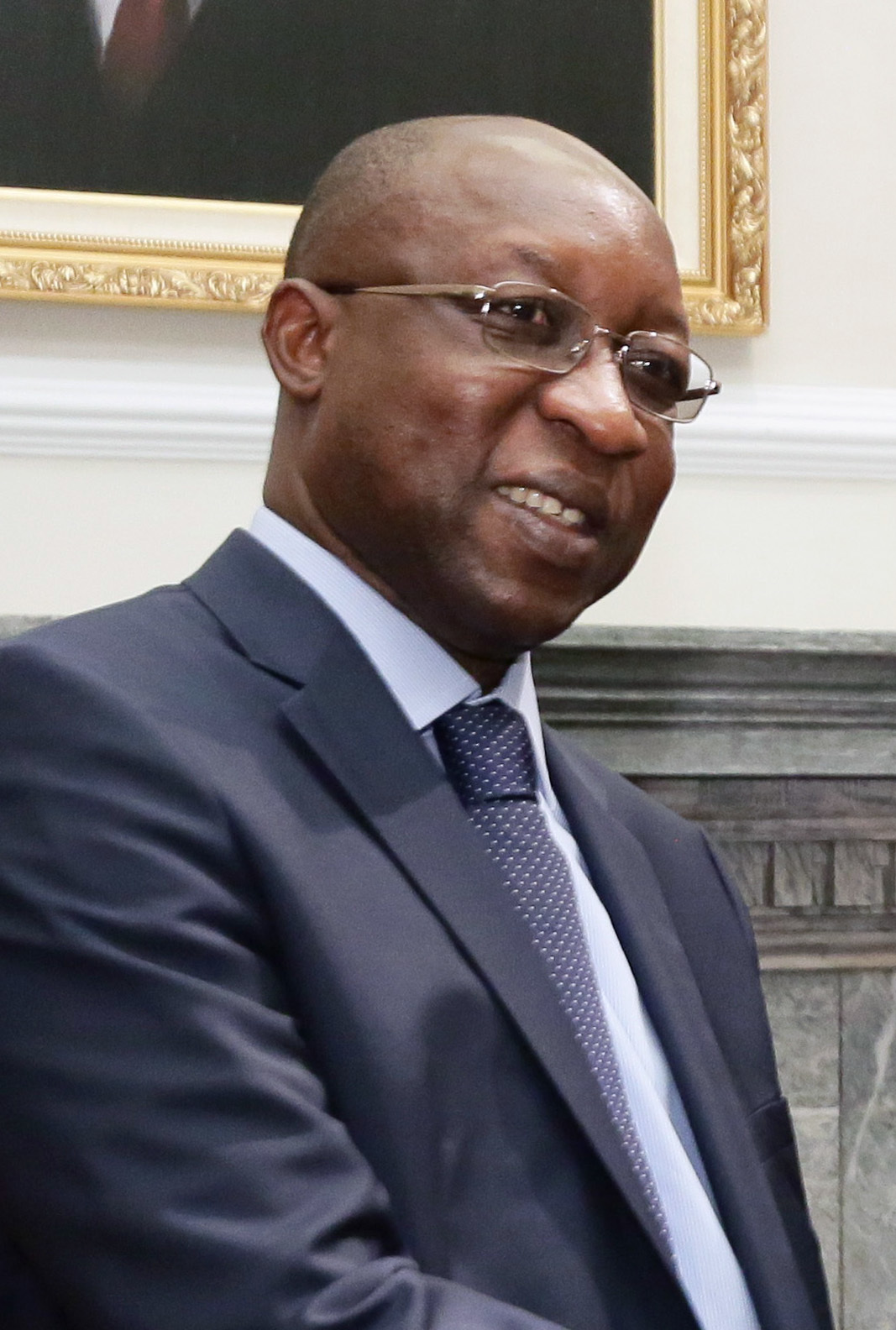

Prime Minister of Burkina Faso
- In office 6 January 2016 – 18 January 2019
- President: Roch Marc Christian Kaboré
- Preceded by: Yacouba Isaac Zida
- Succeeded by: Christophe Joseph Marie Dabiré

Personal details
- Born: 28 July 1960 (age 66) Bobo-Dioulasso, Upper Volta (now Burkina Faso)
- Party: Independent
- Education: University of Ouagadougou; Paris Descartes University; Pierre Mendès-France; University

Paul Kaba Thieba (born 28 July 1960) is a Burkinabé economist and politician who was appointed and served as Prime Minister of Burkina Faso from 6 January 2016 to 18 January 2019. Thieba was appointed by President Roch Marc Christian Kaboré on 6 January 2016, shortly after Kaboré took office. Previously he worked at the Central Bank of West African States and the West African Monetary Union.

== Early life and education ==
Paul Kaba Thieba was born on 28 July 1960 in Bobo-Dioulasso, Upper Volta. Thieba obtained a BAC C series from Lycée Philippe Zinda Kaboré in Ouagadougou in June 1979. He obtained a BBA in June 1982 and a year later, an MBA from the University of Ouagadougou. He obtained a Diploma of Advanced Studies (DEA) in June 1984 and a doctorate in December 1987 at the Pierre Mendès-France University. In December 1988, he graduated with a Diploma of Specialized Higher Education (DESS) in Banking and Finance from the Paris Descartes University.

== Career ==
In September 1998, he was appointed head of the foreign exchange service of the Central Bank of West African States (BCEAO) and served until July 2000. Between July 2000 and December 2006, he was assistant director of financial operations. In January 2007, he obtained the position of director of financial operations, which he held until December 2008. Between January 2009 and December 2011, he was adviser to the director of the General Affairs Department and from January 2012, adviser to the Chief Operating Officer.

Between February 2014 and his appointment as head of government in January 2016, he was managing director of the Financial Stability Fund of the West African Monetary Union.

== Prime minister ==
Thieba was appointed prime minister by President Roch Marc Christian Kaboré on 6 January 2016, shortly after Kaboré took office.

He faced his first test as prime minister when Al Qaeda in the Islamic Maghreb militants attacked Hotel Splendid in Ouagadougou on 15 January 2016. Security forces stormed the hotel. Over 30 people were freed and more than 20 people died.

In a cabinet reshuffle on 20 February 2017, the size of Thieba's government was slightly expanded, from 29 to 32 ministers.

On 18 January 2019, Theiba and his entire cabinet resigned from office, a move that was announced in a televised statement by President Kaboré. No reason for the resignation was provided.

== Personal life ==
Thieba is Roman Catholic. He has three children

Political offices
Preceded by Yacouba Isaac Zida; Acting	Prime Minister of Burkina Faso; 2016–2019	Succeeded by Christophe Joseph Marie Dabiré
