= Christophe Joseph Marie Dabiré =

Prime Minister of Burkina Faso (2019–2020; 2021)

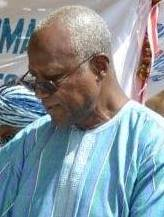

Prime Minister of Burkina Faso
- In office 5 January 2021 – 8 December 2021
- President: Roch Marc Christian Kaboré
- Preceded by: Vacant
- Succeeded by: Lassina Zerbo
- In office 21 January 2019 – 28 December 2020
- President: Roch Marc Christian Kaboré
- Preceded by: Paul Kaba Thieba
- Succeeded by: Vacant

Personal details
- Born: 27 August 1948 (age 78)
- Children: 3
- Education: University of Benin (Lomé – Togo); University of Bordeaux; University of Lille

Christophe Joseph Marie Dabiré (born 27 August 1948) is a Burkinabé politician who served as the Prime Minister of Burkina Faso from 21 January 2019 to 28 December 2020 and from 5 January 2021 to 8 December 2021. He was appointed to the position of Prime Minister by President Roch Marc Christian Kaboré following the resignation of Paul Kaba Thieba and his cabinet. Dabiré had previously represented Burkina Faso at the West African Economic and Monetary Union, and went on to serve as a minister under former president Blaise Compaoré from 1994 to 1996, with Kaboré holding the title of Prime Minister.

== Career ==
Dabiré served under Thomas Sankara as the director of studies and projects at the Ministry of Economy and Planning from 1984 to 1988, when he became the director general of cooperation at the Ministry of Economy and Planning. He held this position until 1992.

In 1992, Dabiré managed Department of Health, until 1997 when he was responsible for Burkina Faso's Department of Secondary, Higher Education and Scientific Research, a position he would hold until 2000. During that time, he served in the National Assembly of Burkina Faso as a member of the Congress for Democracy and Progress party. After being re-elected to the National Assembly in 2002, Dabiré served another five-year term which expired in 2007. He was appointed to the position of Prime Minister on 21 January 2019.

On 8 December 2021, amid an escalating security crisis, Burkina Faso's president, Roch Kaboré, fired Dabiré as prime minister. The presidential decree said members of the outgoing government would govern the country until a new government could be established.

Political offices
Preceded by Paul Kaba Thieba	Prime Minister of Burkina Faso; 2019–2021	Succeeded by Lassina Zerbo
