= Paramanga Ernest Yonli =

Burkinabé politician

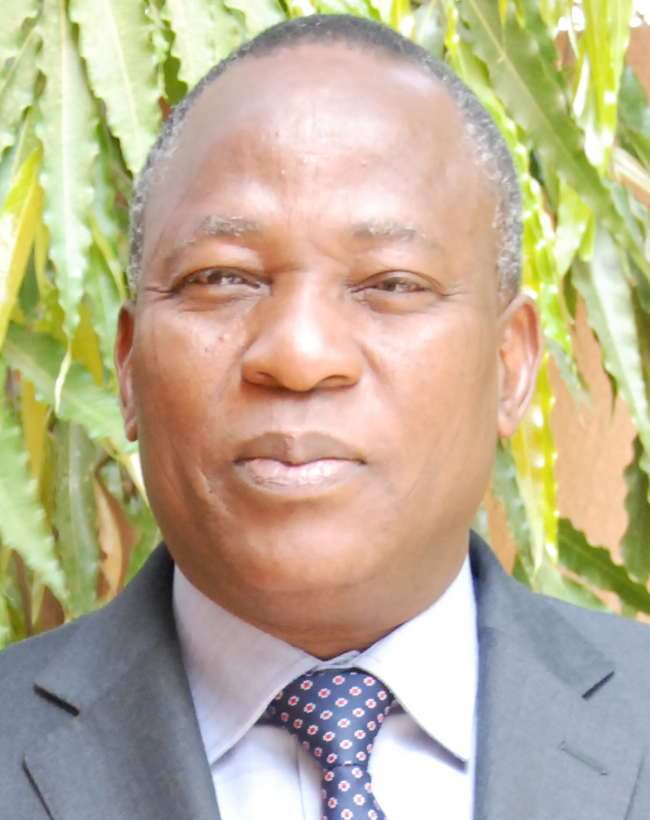
- Yonli in 2015

Prime Minister of Burkina Faso
- In office 6 November 2000 – 3 June 2007
- President: Blaise Compaoré
- Preceded by: Kadré Désiré Ouedraogo
- Succeeded by: Tertius Zongo

Burkinabe Ambassador to the United States
- In office 23 January 2008 – 2 September 2011
- Preceded by: Tertius Zongo
- Succeeded by: Seydou Bouda

Personal details
- Born: 31 December 1956 (age 69) Tansarga, Tapoa Province, Burkina Faso
- Party: Congress for Democracy and Progress
- Spouse: Araba Kadidiatou Zerbo
- Education: University of Groningen

Paramanga Ernest Yonli (born 31 December 1956) also known as Ernest Paramanga Yonli, is a Burkinabé politician. He was Prime Minister from 6 November 2000 to 3 June 2007 and then President of the Economic and Social Council of Burkina Faso until March 2015.

He is a member of the Congress for Democracy and Progress party and a Grand Officer of the National Order of Burkina Faso.

== Biography ==
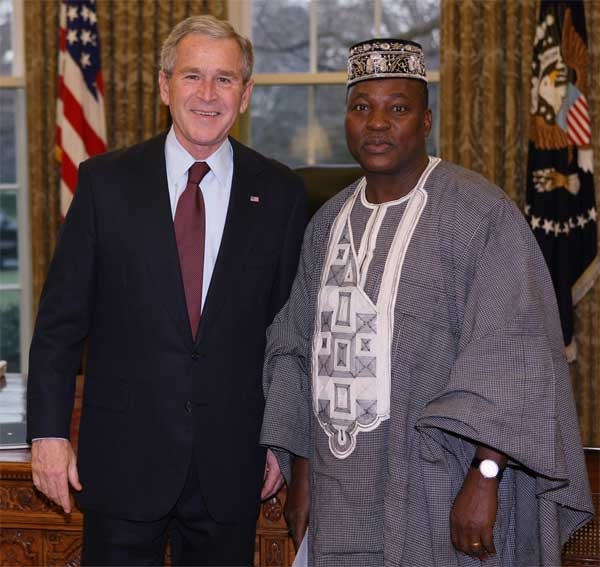
Yonli with President George W. Bush after presenting his credentials, January 22, 2008

Yonli is a descendant of the last dynasty of the Gurma kingdom, founded at the end of the 13th century by migrants from Kanem–Bornu, a region situated initially between modern Niger, Nigeria, and Chad.

This dynasty, often confused with the history of the Gurma people, who live in Eastern Burkina Faso, can be subdivided into three lines: Yobri, Tambaga, and Tansarga.

Paramanga Ernest Yonli comes from one of the ruling families of the last line of Tansarga.

The Gurma society is organized around a power center of a founding family, ministers of the court, and the people. This power center is governed by democratic principles whereby all adult citizens appoint the Chief or the King following an aligned vote. Paramanga Ernest Yonli's great-grandfather, grandfather, and father each ruled Tansarga in the canton of Gobnangou. Today his older brother remains the chief of the village of Tansarga.

Yonli obtained his mathematics and natural sciences baccalaureate with honors in 1976.

At the university level, following a degree in general economics at the University of Ouagadougou, he became top of his class in his Masters in economic sciences at the University of Lome in Togo, then completed his training with a Ph.D. at the University of Groningen in the Netherlands. His thesis focused on "Farmer strategies in food security and cereal marketing: the role of cereal banks in the North Plateau-Central of Burkina Faso."

Paramanga Ernest Yonli is also a specialist in international economics (Paris I University – Pantheon Sorbonne) and development and agricultural economics (same institution).

Married to Safi, one of the daughters of former President Saye Zerbo (1980–82), he is father to four children.

== Career ==
After working in management and business administration in France, he began a career as a researcher at the University of Ouagadougou from 1985 to 1994. During this period, he became a member of an international multi-disciplinary research team whose work focused on “risks in agriculture” in semi-arid areas. This international research body, headquartered in Europe, brings together researchers from the European Union and ECOWAS countries like Ghana, Burkina Faso, Benin, Togo, the Ivory Coast, etc.

The Ph.D. thesis he defended in 1997 at the University of Groningen in the Netherlands was a logical progression from the research results discovered by this international team in Burkina Faso, particularly in the provinces of Yatenga, Sanmatenga, Namentenga, Bam, and Passoré. In October 1994, Paramanga Ernest Yonli was appointed, in addition to his role as researcher, the Director General of the National Fund for the Promotion of Employment (F.A.P.E.). He was tasked with reorganizing this body to promote the self-employment of graduates from the country's universities and professional training colleges.

Upon receiving further funding, Yonli extended the Fund to artisans and the informal sector. He decentralized the Fund, opening branches in Burkina Faso's ten main towns after Ouagadougou and Bobo Dioulasso, thus demonstrating his sense of innovation and openness to modernization.

== Political career ==
In 1992, during the first general elections, which saw the return of Burkina Faso to the rule of law, Yonli was approached to head up the list of ODP/MT candidates in his constituency of Tapoa. He declined the offer for personal reasons, but led the campaign that saw his party win two of the three contested seats.

During the elections for the second government of the 4th Republic in 1997, while simultaneously serving as Cabinet Leader for Prime Minister Kadré Désiré Ouedraogo from 1996, he headed up the list of candidates for the ruling party, which had since become the Congress for Democracy and Progress (CDP). As a result, he won the two contested seats in his constituency and would go on to do the same in 2002, 2007, and 2012.

Although elected four times as a Member of the National Assembly (1997 to 2012), Yonli never took his seat as an MP, occupying senior governmental posts throughout this period instead. Firstly, as Cabinet Leader for the Prime Minister in 1996, as mentioned above, then as Minister of Civil Service and of State Reform in 1997, and finally as Prime Minister and Head of Government in 2000, a post he would occupy for seven years. He holds the record for the longest time spent in senior political positions in his country. Additionally, he served as Minister of Finance from 2000 to 2002.

In 2007, he was appointed Ambassador for Burkina Faso to the United States. He would be the first Ambassador to bring together the entire Burkinabé community residing in the United States, as well as traveling regularly to the University of Houston in Texas to visit one of the largest Burkinabé student communities in the United States.

He returned to his home country in 2012 to become President of the Economic and Social Council, a post he still occupies today.

== Achievements for Burkina Faso ==
The leadership of Yonli was characterized by his innovation, his promotion of the fundamental values of Burkinabé society (dialogue – tolerance - forgiveness), and efficiency.

=== Implementation of the Global Public Administration Reform (RGAP) ===
When in September 1997, President Blaise Compaoré appointed Yonli as Minister for Civil Service, he gave him the formidable task of overseeing the Global Public Administration Reform. Following several attempts at reform, both with social partners and with members of the National Assembly, this project had still not been completed despite the government's overwhelming majority in the National Assembly (101 MPs out of 111). It was the first challenge taken up by Yonli. Following the start of his role in September 1997, he would organize national reform hearings in December of the same year and successfully secure the adoption of three laws governing the Global Public Administration Reform as of the first session of the National Assembly in 1998.

=== Institutionalization of social dialogue ===
To further cement the public administration reform, Yonli implemented a permanent consultation framework between trade union organizations and the government. This government-trade union meeting was to become institutionalized in 2000 when Yonli became the Burkinabé head of government. These now annual meetings allow the two sides to examine on a yearly basis the negotiating platform of trade union organizations on the one hand, and government actions aimed at the promotion and optimization of the reform's content on the other. The institutionalization of these meetings has helped reduce labour conflicts as much as possible, and to instil trust between the government and workers’ unions, both of which have shored up social stability which is a pre-requisite for the harmonious development of a nascent democracy.

=== Institutionalization of government-private sector dialogue ===
In July 2001, in Bobo Dioulasso, Yonli decided in agreement with the business world, to institutionalize exchanges between the government and the entire private sector. Welcomed by the Chamber of Commerce and development partners, this meeting which is held yearly in the economic capital allows countries to share their economic and social achievements over the past year, gauge the extent of challenges faced and forecast for the year ahead. This meeting, which still takes place today, has become a key tool for economic governance in Burkina Faso, because it allows the government to make their interventions in the economic sector more targeted, in line with medium and long-term economic planning benchmarks.

=== National Youth Forum and Annual women’s conference ===
Drawing on the sectoral strategies of international organisations, under the Yonli government Burkina Faso decided to go beyond conventional gender management methods and organise annual meetings focused on women and young people in 2004. These meetings have served as a forum for self-reflection and brainstorming to effectively tackle the problem of promoting and developing these two social groups who make up more than 70% of the country's active population.

=== Creation of ‘’BURKINA 2025’’ and reintroduction of the National Territorial Development Plan (SNAT) ===
When Yonli became head of government at the end of 2000, he had three main objectives:

1. Quickly restore peace after the assassination of journalist Norbert Zongo;
2. Ensure decentralization;
3. Speed up the implementation of poverty reduction reforms.

These three objectives were tackled by a cabinet which he composed himself and submitted to Président COMPAORÉ who approved it without any significant changes. The cabinet made up of technocrats, politicians and representatives from civil society, got to work on the priorities set by Yonli.

On a social level, dialogue was used as a driving force to foster the right conditions for peace through calls for tolerance and patriotism. In terms of the decentralization objective, the government chose a progressive approach to ensure the best conditions for the adoption of this process by business managers, elected representatives and the wider population.

On an economic level, under the Yonli Government, economic growth went from an annual rate of between 3 and 4% to a rate ranging from 7 to 9%.

Decentralization in Burkina Faso was kick-started. As a result, the process is now complete and serves as a benchmark in the sub-region. Under the Yonli Government, 13 regions were created, making up the 4 provinces. Furthermore, the guidelines for decentralization allowed for the number of communes to be changed from 55 to 30, to allow the population to appoint their local authorities, which led to the development of participatory democracy and also to the development of local economies.

Programmes to combat poverty, although not achieving all anticipated results, have made the country the best economic performer in the sub-region from the point of view of its multilateral partners.

It is also worth mentioning the ten-year education development programme, which has helped speed up the literacy rate. Under his government, the rate of school enrolment has gone from 39 to 70% in seven years.

Instruments for the identification, evaluation and reduction of poverty have become tools for planning and economic governance leaders. These are things which help to make development projects and programmes targeted and yield better results.

This was consolidated thanks to the two major decisions which today underpin the country's economic and social governance:

- Making development part of the long-term perspective through the creation of a national roadmap called BURKINA 2025.
- The creation of a global visibility framework called the National Territorial Development Plan, which organizes development by tapping into regional potential, to optimize the various areas of expertise specific to each region.

=== Economic promotion of Burkina Faso overseas ===
In 2004, Yonli undertook a world tour to promote Burkina Faso's economic potential. The objective of his trip was to provide sufficient information on the economic potential of the country to thus increase its attractiveness to investors.

With this in mind, he visited, accompanied by business leaders:

- April 2004: Geneva, with 50 businessmen.
- October 2004: Canada, with 80 businessmen. During his visit, he heavily emphasized Burkina Faso's gold mining potential.
- April 2005: France, with 70 businessmen.
- September 2005: Malaysia, again with around 50 businessmen.

The most significant results of this came after the visit to Canada. It was during this visit that major gold mines were opened, including the first gold mine in Taparko (Sanmatenga province). By 2009, six gold mines were operational, placing gold at the top of the list of products exported from the country, ahead of cotton. Currently, a new mining code is in the process of being adopted, to strike a balance between the profits made by miners, the government and the local populations.

=== Achievements within the Economic and Social Council ===
Since 2012, as President of the Economic and Social Council, Yonli has published various reports including:

- A report on agriculture, highlighting the need to develop this sector in Burkina Faso.
- A second report on gold and the need to submit a new mining code to the National Assembly.
- A third report on governance and distrust of public authority, with solutions for sustainable social stability.

== Opposition to Article 37 ==
Having reiterated the legality of such a Constitutional reform during a meeting of the CDP at the Stade du 4 Août, Yonli nevertheless officially participated in Autumn 2014 in the drafting of a public report to the Economic and Social Council on the political and social risks linked to such a Constitutional reform.

It is noteworthy that the National Assembly's draft vote on the reform of Article 37 of Burkina Faso's Constitution ultimately caused President Blaise Compaoré's demise.

== Distinctions and awards ==
- Member of several charitable organizations
- Grand Officer of the National Order
- Officer of the National Order
- Commander of the Order of Brilliant Star with a special grand cordon, of the Republic of China (Taiwan).
