= List of prime ministers of Burkina Faso =

Prime Minister of Burkina Faso
- Premier ministre du Burkina Faso
- Coat of Arms

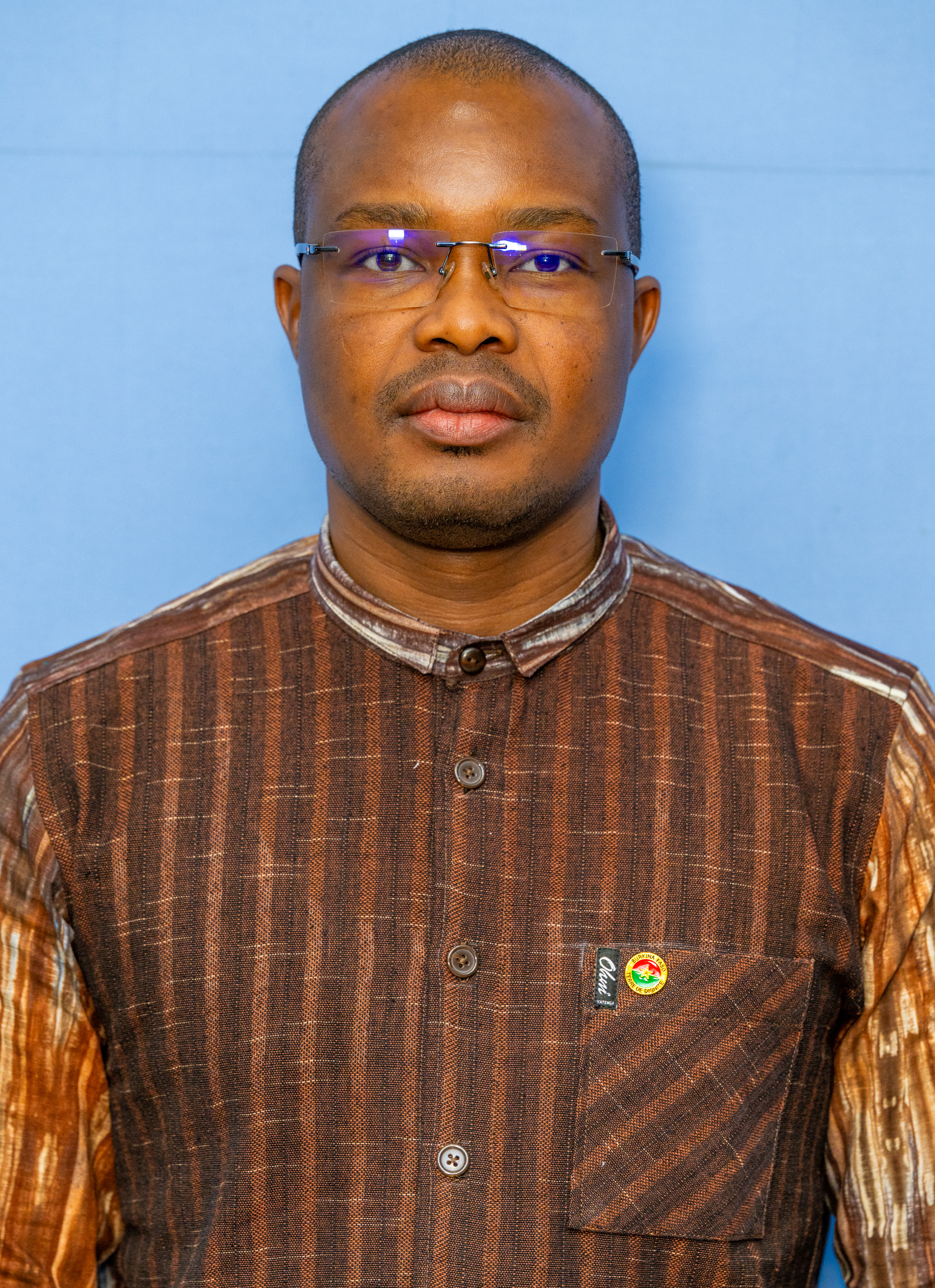
- Incumbent; Jean Emmanuel Ouédraogo (Interim) since 7 December 2024
- Status: Head of government
- Appointer: Ibrahim Traoré, as Interim President of Burkina Faso
- Inaugural holder: Gérard Kango Ouédraogo
- Formation: 13 February 1971; 55 years ago
- Salary: CFA 869,740/US$1,425 annually including allowances

This is a list of prime ministers of Burkina Faso since the formation of the post of Prime Minister of the Republic of Upper Volta in 1971 to the present day.

A total of fifteen people have served as Prime Minister of Upper Volta/Burkina Faso (not counting three Interim Prime Ministers).

The current interim Prime Minister of Burkina Faso is Jean Emmanuel Ouédraogo, since 7 December 2024.

== List of officeholders ==
Political parties

Voltaic Democratic Union – African Democratic Rally (UDV–RDA)
Organization for Popular Democracy – Labour Movement (ODP–MT)
Congress for Democracy and Progress (CDP)

Other factions

Military
Independent

Status

Interim Prime Minister

No.	Portrait	Name (Birth–Death)	Term of office			Political party	Head(s) of state
No.	Portrait	Name (Birth–Death)	Took office	Left office	Time in office	Political party	Head(s) of state
Republic of Upper Volta
1		Gérard Kango Ouédraogo (1925–2014)	13 February 1971	8 February 1974 (deposed)	2 years, 360 days	UDV–RDA	Lamizana
2		Sangoulé Lamizana (1916–2005)	8 February 1974	7 July 1978	4 years, 149 days	Independent	Himself
3		Joseph Conombo (1917–2008)	7 July 1978	25 November 1980 (deposed)	2 years, 141 days	UDV–RDA	Lamizana
4		Saye Zerbo (1932–2013)	25 November 1980	7 November 1982 (deposed)	1 year, 347 days	Military	Himself
Vacant (7 November 1982 – 10 January 1983)
5		Thomas Sankara (1949–1987)	10 January 1983	17 May 1983 (dismissed and arrested)	127 days	Military	Ouédraogo
Post abolished (17 May 1983 – 4 August 1984)
Burkina Faso
Post abolished (4 August 1984 – 16 June 1992)
6		Youssouf Ouédraogo (1952–2017)	16 June 1992	22 March 1994	1 year, 279 days	ODP–MT	Compaoré
7		Roch Marc Christian Kaboré (born 1957)	22 March 1994	6 February 1996	1 year, 321 days	ODP–MT	Compaoré
8		Kadré Désiré Ouédraogo (born 1953)	6 February 1996	6 November 2000	4 years, 274 days	CDP	Compaoré
9		Paramanga Ernest Yonli (born 1956)	6 November 2000	4 June 2002	1 year, 210 days	CDP	Compaoré
9		Paramanga Ernest Yonli (born 1956)	6 June 2002	4 January 2006	3 years, 212 days	CDP	Compaoré
9		Paramanga Ernest Yonli (born 1956)	5 January 2006	3 June 2007	1 year, 149 days	CDP	Compaoré
10		Tertius Zongo (born 1957)	4 June 2007	12 January 2011	3 years, 222 days	CDP	Compaoré
10		Tertius Zongo (born 1957)	13 January 2011	15 April 2011	92 days	CDP	Compaoré
11		Luc-Adolphe Tiao (born 1954)	18 April 2011	27 December 2012	1 year, 253 days	CDP	Compaoré
11		Luc-Adolphe Tiao (born 1954)	31 December 2012	30 October 2014 (dismissed)	1 year, 303 days	CDP	Compaoré
Vacant (30 October – 18 November 2014)
12		Yacouba Isaac Zida (born 1965)	18 November 2014	17 September 2015 (deposed)	303 days	Military (RSP)	Kafando
Vacant (17 – 23 September 2015)
(12)		Yacouba Isaac Zida (born 1965)	23 September 2015 (restored)	28 December 2015	96 days	Military	Kafando
Vacant (28 December 2015 – 6 January 2016)
13		Paul Kaba Thieba (born 1960)	6 January 2016	18 January 2019 (resigned)	3 years, 12 days	Independent	Kaboré
Vacant (18 – 21 January 2019)
14		Christophe Joseph Marie Dabiré (born 1948)	21 January 2019	28 December 2020	1 year, 342 days	Independent	Kaboré
14		Christophe Joseph Marie Dabiré (born 1948)	5 January 2021	8 December 2021	337 days	Independent	Kaboré
15		Lassina Zerbo (born 1963)	10 December 2021	24 January 2022 (deposed)	45 days	Independent	Kaboré
Vacant (24 January – 3 March 2022)
–		Albert Ouédraogo (born 1969)	3 March 2022	30 September 2022 (deposed)	211 days	Independent	Damiba
Vacant (30 September 2022 – 21 October 2022)
–		Apollinaire J. Kyélem de Tambèla (born 1958)	21 October 2022	6 December 2024	2 years, 46 days	Independent	Traoré
Vacant (6 – 7 December 2024)
–		Jean Emmanuel Ouédraogo (born 1980)	7 December 2024	Incumbent	1 year, 277 days	Independent	Traoré

== See also ==
- Politics of Burkina Faso
- List of heads of state of Burkina Faso
- List of colonial governors of French Upper Volta
