= History of Burkina Faso =

The history of Burkina Faso includes the history of various kingdoms within the country, such as the Mossi kingdoms, as well as the later French colonisation of the territory and its independence as the Republic of Upper Volta in 1960.

== Ancient and medieval history ==
Iron production occurred in regions near Douroula at least as far back as the 8th century BCE and was widely practiced across the region by the 5th century BCE. Furnaces, mines, and surrounding dwellings dating from this time period are found across the country.

Recent archeological discoveries at Bura in southwest Niger and in adjacent southwest Burkina Faso have documented the existence of the iron-age Bura culture from the 3rd century to the 13th century. The Bura-Asinda system of settlements apparently covered the lower Niger River valley, including the Boura region of Burkina Faso. Further research is needed to understand the role this early culture played in the ancient and medieval history of West Africa.

Loropéni is an ancient stone ruin which was linked to the gold trade between the 14th and 17th centuries. It is a World Heritage Site.

From medieval times until the end of the 19th century, the central region of present-day Burkina Faso was ruled by the Mossi people, descendants of warriors of the Dagomba people of present-day Ghana, who mixed with Mandé and other local peoples in the 11th century. During this time, the Mossi Kingdoms successfully defended their territory, religious beliefs and social structure against forcible attempts at conquest and conversion by their Muslim neighbors to the northwest.

== 20th Century history ==
=== French Upper Volta ===
The French arrived and claimed the area in 1896, but Mossi resistance ended only with the capture of their capital Ouagadougou in 1901. In 1919, certain provinces from Ivory Coast were united into French Upper Volta in the French West Africa federation. In 1932, the new colony was split up for economic reasons; it was reconstituted in 1937 as an administrative division called the Upper Coast. After World War II, the Mossi actively pressured the French for separate territorial status, and on 4 September 1947, Upper Volta became a French West African territory again in its own right.

A revision in the organization of French Overseas Territories began with the passage of the Basic Law (Loi Cadre) of 23 July 1956. This act was followed by reorganizational measures approved by the French parliament early in 1957, which ensured a large degree of self-government for individual territories. Upper Volta became an autonomous republic in the French community on 11 December 1958. On 11 July 1960, France agreed to Upper Volta becoming fully independent.

=== Republic of Upper Volta ===
The Republic of Upper Volta declared independence on 5 August 1960. The first president, Maurice Yaméogo, was the leader of the Voltaic Democratic Union (UDV). The 1960 constitution provided for election by universal suffrage of a president and a national assembly for 5-year terms. Soon after coming to power, Yaméogo banned all political parties other than the UDV. Yaméogo's government was viewed as corrupt and said to perpetuate neo-colonialism by favoring French political and economic interests, which had allowed politicians to enrich themselves but not the nation's peasants or small class of urban workers.

The government lasted until 1966, when—after much unrest, including mass demonstrations and strikes by students, labor unions, and civil servants—the military intervened and deposed Yaméogo in the 1966 Upper Voltan coup d'état. The coup leaders suspended the constitution, dissolved the National Assembly, and placed Lieutenant Colonel Sangoulé Lamizana at the head of a government of senior army officers; the army remained in power for 4 years. On 14 June 1970, the Voltans ratified a new constitution that established a 4-year transition period toward complete civilian rule. Lamizana remained in power throughout the 1970s as president of military or mixed civil-military governments. He faced a major crisis in the form of the Sahel drought and was sent in 1973 to the United Nations and the United States to secure aid. After conflict over the 1970 constitution, a new constitution was written and approved in 1977, and Lamizana was reelected by open elections in 1978.

Lamizana's government faced problems with the country's traditionally powerful trade unions, and on 25 November 1980, Colonel Saye Zerbo overthrew President Lamizana in a bloodless coup. Colonel Zerbo established the Military Committee of Recovery for National Progress as the supreme governmental authority, thus eradicating the 1977 constitution. Colonel Zerbo also encountered resistance from trade unions and was overthrown two years later on 7 November 1982, by Major Dr. Jean-Baptiste Ouédraogo and the Council of Popular Salvation (CSP).

The CSP banned political parties and organizations, yet promised a transition to civilian rule and a new constitution. Infighting developed between the right and left factions of the CSP. The leader of the leftists, Captain Thomas Sankara, was appointed prime minister in January 1983, but was subsequently arrested. Efforts to free him, directed by Captain Blaise Compaoré, resulted in a military coup d'état on 4 August 1983.

The coup brought Sankara to power, and his government began to implement a series of revolutionary programs which included mass-vaccinations, infrastructure improvements, the expansion of women's rights, encouragement of domestic agricultural consumption, and anti-desertification projects.

== Burkina Faso ==
On 2 August 1984, on President Sankara's initiative, the country's name was changed from Upper Volta to Burkina Faso (land of the upright/honest people). The presidential decree was confirmed by the National Assembly on 4 August.

Sankara's government formed the National Council for the Revolution (CNR), with Sankara as its president, and established popular Committees for the Defense of the Revolution (CDRs). The Pioneers of the Revolution youth programme was also established.

Sankara launched an ambitious socioeconomic programme for change, one of the largest ever undertaken on the African continent. His foreign policies were centred on anti-imperialism, with his government denying all foreign aid, pushing for odious debt reduction, nationalising all land and mineral wealth, and averting the power and influence of the International Monetary Fund (IMF) and World Bank. His domestic policies included a nationwide literacy campaign, land redistribution to peasants, railway and road construction, and the outlawing of female genital mutilation, forced marriages and polygamy.

Sankara pushed for agrarian self-sufficiency and promoted public health by vaccinating 2,500,000 children against meningitis, yellow fever, and measles. His national agenda also included planting over 10,000,000 trees to halt the growing desertification of the Sahel. Sankara called on every village to build a medical dispensary and had over 350 communities build schools with their own labour.

=== Five-day War with Mali ===
On 25 December (Christmas Day) 1985, tensions with Mali over the mineral-rich Agacher Strip erupted in a war that lasted five days and killed about 100 people. The conflict ended after mediation by President Félix Houphouët-Boigny of Ivory Coast. The conflict is known as the "Christmas war" in Burkina Faso.

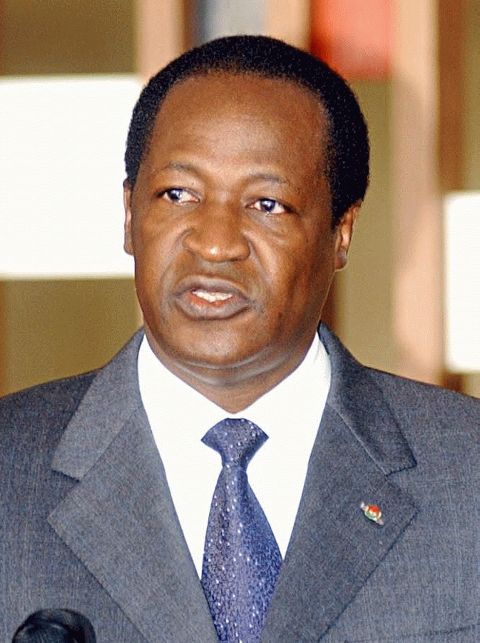
Blaise Compaoré

=== Rule of Blaise Compaoré ===
The CDRs, which were formed as popular mass organizations, deteriorated in some areas into gangs of armed thugs and clashed with several trade unions. Tensions over the repressive tactics of the government and its overall direction mounted steadily. On 15 October 1987, Sankara was assassinated in a coup which brought Captain Blaise Compaoré to power.

Compaoré, Captain Henri Zongo, and Major Jean-Baptiste Boukary Lengani formed the Popular Front (FP), which pledged to continue and pursue the goals of the revolution and to "rectify" Sankara's "deviations" from the original aims. The new government, in aims of bourgeois support, tacitly moderated many of Sankara's policies. As part of a much-discussed political "opening" process, several political organizations, three of them non-Marxist, were accepted under an umbrella political organization created in June 1989 by the FP.

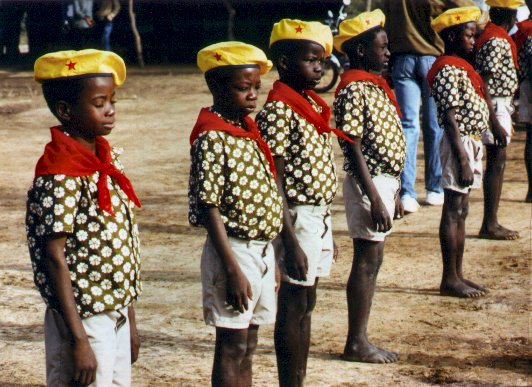
Children of the 1983–1987 revolution

Some members of the leftist Organization for Popular Democracy (Organisation pour la Démocratie Populaire/Mouvement du Travail, ODP/MT) were against the admission of non-Marxist groups in the front. On 18 September 1989, while Compaoré was returning from a two-week trip to Asia, Lengani and Zongo were accused of plotting to overthrow the Popular Front. They were arrested and executed in the same night. Compaoré reorganized the government, appointed several new ministers, and assumed the portfolio of Minister of Defense and Security. On 23 December 1989, a presidential security detail arrested about 30 civilians and military personnel accused of plotting a coup in collaboration with the Burkinabe external opposition.

Burkina Faso adopted a new constitution on 2 June 1991.

In 2005, Compaoré was elected to his third term. In November 2010, President Compaoré was re–elected for a fourth straight term. He won 80.2% of the vote, while Hama Arba Diallo came a distant second with 8.2%.

In February 2011, the death of a schoolboy provoked an uprising in the entire country, lasting through April 2011, which was coupled with a military mutiny and with a strike of the magistrates (see 2011 Burkina Faso uprising).

=== Overthrow of Compaoré ===
In June 2014, Compaoré's ruling party, the CDP, called on him to organise a referendum that would allow him to alter the constitution in order to seek re-election in 2015; otherwise he would be forced to step down due to term limits.

On 30 October 2014, the National Assembly was scheduled to debate an amendment to the constitution which would have enabled Compaoré to stand for re-election as president in 2015. Opponents protested this by storming the parliament building in Ouagadougou, starting fires inside it, and looting offices; billowing smoke was reported to be coming from the building by the BBC. Opposition spokesman Pargui Emile Paré, of the People's Movement for Socialism / Federal Party, described the protests as "Burkina Faso’s black spring, like the Arab spring".

Compaoré reacted to the events by shelving the proposed constitutional changes, dissolving the government, declaring a state of emergency, and offering to work with the opposition to resolve the crisis. Later in the day, the military, under General Honoré Traoré, announced that it would install a transitional government "in consultation with all parties" and that the National Assembly was dissolved; he foresaw "a return to the constitutional order" within a year. He did not make clear what role, if any, he envisioned for Compaoré during the transitional period. Compaoré said that he was prepared to leave office at the end of the transition.

On 31 October, Compaoré announced that he had left the presidency and there was a "power vacuum", calling for a "free and transparent" election within 90 days. Yacouba Isaac Zida then took over the reins as head of state in an interim capacity.

On 17 November 2014, a civilian, Michel Kafando, was chosen to replace Zida as transitional head of state: he was sworn in on 18 November. Kafando then appointed Zida as Prime Minister of Burkina Faso on 19 November 2014.

On 19 July 2015, amidst tensions between the military and Prime Minister Zida, Kafando stripped Zida of the defense portfolio and took over the portfolio himself. He also took over the security portfolio, previously held by Zida's ally Auguste Denise Barry. As part of the same reshuffle, he appointed Moussa Nébié to replace himself as Minister of Foreign Affairs.

=== September 2015 coup d'état attempt ===
On 16 September 2015, two days after a recommendation from the National Reconciliation and Reforms Commission to disband the Regiment of Presidential Security (Régiment de la sécurité présidentielle, RSP), members of the RSP detained President Kafando and Prime Minister Zida, and installed the National Council for Democracy to power with Gilbert Diendéré as its chairman.

The military chief of staff (chef d'état-major des armées du Burkina Faso), Brigadier General Pingrenoma Zagré, called on members of the RSP to lay down their arms, promising in a statement that they would not be harmed if they surrendered peacefully.

Kafando was believed to remain under house arrest until 21 September, when he was reported to have arrived at the residence of the French ambassador. The regular army issued an ultimatum to the RSP to surrender by the morning of 22 September.

Kafando was reinstalled as president at a ceremony on 23 September in the presence of Economic Community of West African States (ECOWAS) leaders.

On 25 September, the RSP was disbanded by government decree. On 26 September, the assets of Diendéré and others associated with the coup, as well as the assets of four political parties, including the CDP, were frozen by the state prosecutor. Djibril Bassolé and Eddie Komboïgo, who were barred from standing as presidential candidates, both had their assets frozen. Bassolé was arrested on 29 September for allegedly supporting the coup.

=== 2015 general election ===
On 13 October 2015, it was announced that general elections would be held on 29 November 2015. The Congress for Democracy and Progress was banned from running a presidential candidate, but was still able to participate in the parliamentary election.

The presidential election was won by Roch Marc Christian Kaboré of the People's Movement for Progress (Mouvement du Peuple pour le Progrès, MPP), who received 53% of the vote in the first round, negating the need for a second round. The parliamentary election was also won by MPP, which scored 34.71% of votes and won 55 seats in the National Assembly, followed by the Union of Progress and Reform (20.53%, 33 seats) and the Congress for Democracy and Progress (13.20%, 18 seats).

On 29 December 2015, Kaboré was sworn in as president, and on 7 January 2016, he appointed Paul Kaba Thieba as Prime Minister.

=== 2018 status ===
The US Central Intelligence Agency's 2018 World Factbook provided a summary assessment of Burkina Faso, writing:

"Burkina Faso is a poor, landlocked country that depends on adequate rainfall. Irregular patterns of rainfall, poor soil, and the lack of adequate communications and other infrastructure contribute to the economy’s vulnerability to external shocks. About 80% of the population is engaged in subsistence farming and cotton is the main cash crop. The country has few natural resources and a weak industrial base. Cotton and gold are Burkina Faso’s key exports ...The country has seen an upswing in gold exploration, production, and exports. While the end of the political crisis has allowed Burkina Faso’s economy to resume positive growth, the country’s fragile security situation could put these gains at risk. Political insecurity in neighboring Mali, unreliable energy supplies, and poor transportation links pose long-term challenges."

According to the report, civil unrest continued to be problematic: "The country experienced terrorist attacks in its capital in 2016, 2017, and 2018 and continues to mobilize resources to counter terrorist threats." In 2018, several governments warned their citizens not to travel into the northern part of the country or into several provinces in the East Region. The CIA report also claims that, "Burkina Faso's high population growth, recurring drought, pervasive and perennial food insecurity, and limited natural resources result in poor economic prospects for the majority of its citizens". The report is optimistic in some aspects, particularly in regard to the work being done with assistance by the International Monetary Fund: "A new three-year IMF program (2018-2020), approved in 2018, will allow the government to reduce the budget deficit and preserve critical spending on social services and priority public investments."

=== November 2020 election ===
In the 2020 general election, President Roch Marc Christian Kaboré was re-elected. However, his party, MPP, failed to reach absolute parliamentary majority. It secured 56 seats out of a total of 127. The Congress for Democracy and Progress (CDP), the party of former President Blaise Compaoré, was a distant second with 20 seats.

=== 2022 military coups ===
On 24 January 2022, President Roch Kaboré was ousted in a military coup. Lieutenant Colonel Paul-Henri Sandaogo Damiba was the leader of Patriotic Movement for Safeguard and Restoration (MPSR), which included all sections of the army. MPSR announced that it had decided to end President Kabore's post. On 31 January, the ruling military government appointed coup leader Paul-Henri Sandaogo Damiba as interim president. The African Union (AU) suspended the membership of Burkina Faso.

On 30 September 2022, the second military coup took place and Damiba was ousted over his inability to deal with an Islamist insurgency. Captain Ibrahim Traoré took over as interim leader. President Damiba resigned and left the country. On 6 October 2022, Captain Ibrahim Traore was officially appointed as president of Burkina Faso.

== See also ==
- Ouagadougou history and timeline (capital and largest city)
- History of Africa
- History of West Africa
- List of heads of government of Burkina Faso
- List of heads of state of Burkina Faso
- Politics of Burkina Faso
