= 2016 Burkina Faso coup attempt =

2016 political crisis in Burkina Faso

2016 Burkina Faso coup d'état
Date	8 October 2016
Location	Ouagadougou, Burkina Faso
Result	Coup failed

Belligerents
ex-RSP members	Government of Burkina Faso

Commanders and leaders
Gaston Coulibaly	Roch Marc Christian Kaboré; Paul Kaba Thieba

Casualties and losses
- 2 killed and 10+ arrested

The 2016 Burkina Faso coup d'état attempt was an attempt to overthrow the government of Burkina Faso on 8 October 2016. At least 30 ex-members of the elite presidential guard (known as the RSP) planned an attack on three locations: the presidential residence, an Army barracks, and a prison in Ouagadougou, the capital of Burkina Faso. Two people were killed and at least ten other people have been arrested in connection with the attempt. The attempted coup was led by Gaston Coulibaly, an ex-RSP member.

== See also ==
- 2014 Burkinabé uprising
- 2015 Burkinabé coup d'état
- History of Burkina Faso
