= Serge Bambara =

Burkinabé musician and music executive (born 1971)

- Born: 24 October 1971 (age 54); Republic of Upper Volta (now Burkina Faso)
- Other name: Smockey
- Occupations: Actor, hip hop artist, actor and political activist
- Spouse: Kady Traoré
- Awards: Kora Awards

Serge Bambara (also known by his stage name Smockey, born 24 October 1971) is a hip hop artist, actor and political activist from Ouagadougou, the capital of Burkina Faso.

== Biography ==
Born in what was then the Republic of Upper Volta, the son of a Bissa father and a French mother, he moved to France to study in 1991. In 1999 he signed a contract with EMI and launched a first single, featuring the singer Lââm. In 2001 he moved back to Burkina Faso and started the studio Abazon. He has released the albums Epitaphe, Zamana, Code noir and Cravate Costards et Pourriture, and cooperated with the prominent Senegalese rapper Didier Awadi.

Bambara won the "Best Artist of the Year" category of Kundé, a national Burkinabé music award, in 2006. He was presented the award by Chantal Compaoré, First Lady of Burkina Faso at the time. In 2010 he won the Kora Awards, in the category "Best Hip-Hop Artist". Bambara also starred in a 2008 film adaption of the Ivorian author Ahmadou Kourouma's novel En attendant le vote des bêtes sauvages, directed by Missa Hébié.

Politically a Sankarist, Bambara heavily opposed the government of President Blaise Compaoré, and has expressed support for Thomas Sankara, a radical left-wing revolutionary who ruled the country from 1983 until he was deposed and killed by Compaoré in 1987. In a 2014 BBC interview he stated his views on Sankara's legacy: "It allowed us to be more proud to be African and to pull out of that inferiority complex, to realise we can accomplish things". Much of his work has political themes.

In 2013 he co-founded Le Balai Citoyen ("The Citizen's Broom"), a grassroots political movement, together with the reggae musician Sams’K Le Jah. The movement participated in the 2014 Burkinabé uprising, a wave of protests which on 31 October 2014 forced President Compaoré to resign and flee the country. Bambara, a prominent opposition leader during the uprising, supported the military's decision to lead the country through a transitional period.

On September 17, 2015, Bambara's recording studio, Studio Abazon, was bombed and destroyed by the Regiment of Presidential Security, loyal to ousted President Blaise Compaoré.

Bambara married the actress Kady Traoré on 31 January 2008.

== See also ==
- Music of Burkina Faso
