= 2014 Burkina Faso uprising =

Uprising that overthrew President Blaise Compaoré

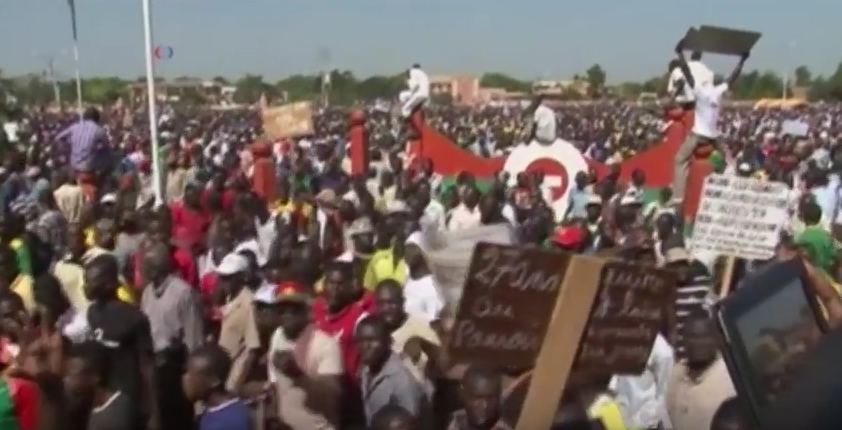
- Thousands of protesters march through Ouagadougou
- Date: 28 October 2014 – 3 November 2014
- Location: Ouagadougou, Bobo-Dioulasso and Ouahigouya, Burkina Faso
- Caused by: Constitutional electoral law change (abolition of presidential term limits)
- Goals: Political reforms, mainly discontinuation of the president's term
- Methods: Protests; Riots; Civil resistance; Civil disobedience; Demonstrations; Labor strikes
- Result: Suspension of constitutional amendment bill in parliament.; Parliament dissolved.; President Blaise Compaoré resigns and flees to Ivory Coast.; Yacouba Isaac Zida becomes acting president, amid immediate dispute but eventual resolution.

Parties
(Burkina Faso) Opposition; People's Movement for Progress; Union for Progress and Reform; Union for Rebirth / Sankarist Party; Party for Development and Change; National Rebirth Party; Le Balai Citoyen	Government of Burkina Faso; Congress for Democracy and Progress; Alliance for Democracy and Federation – African Democratic Rally	Burkina Faso Armed Forces; Presidential Security Regiment

Lead figures
(Burkina Faso) Zéphirin Diabré (Burkina Faso) Bénéwendé Stanislas Sankara (Burkina Faso) Simon Compaoré (Burkina Faso) Pargui Emile Paré (Burkina Faso) Roch Marc Christian Kaboré (Burkina Faso) Salif Diallo (Burkina Faso) General Kouamé Lougué (Since 30 October) (Burkina Faso) Saran Sereme (Burkina Faso) Laurent Bado (Burkina Faso) Barry Tahirou (Burkina Faso) Sams’K Le Jah (Burkina Faso) Guy Hervé Kam	Blaise Compaoré President (Burkina Faso) Luc-Adolphe Tiao Prime Minister (Burkina Faso) Soungalo Ouattara National Assembly Speaker	(Burkina Faso) Lieutenant Colonel; Yacouba Isaac Zida (Burkina Faso) General Honoré Nabéré Traoré

Casualties and losses
6 deaths (at least 3 on 30 October) (1 after army takeover)		

The 2014 Burkina Faso uprising was a series of demonstrations and riots in Burkina Faso in October 2014 that quickly spread to multiple cities. They began in response to attempts at changing the constitution to allow President Blaise Compaoré to run again and extend his 27 years in office. Pressure for political change came from civil society and in particular from the country's youth. Following a tumultuous day on 30 October, which included the involvement of former Defence Minister Kouamé Lougué and the burning of the National Assembly and other government buildings as well as the ruling Congress for Democracy and Progress party's headquarters, Compaoré dissolved the government and declared a state of emergency before eventually fleeing to Côte d'Ivoire with the support of Ivorian President Alassane Ouattara.

General Honoré Nabéré Traoré announced that a transitional government would run the country until an election within 12 months. After another day of mass protests and initially refusing to resign, after mounting domestic pressure Compaoré resigned from his 27-year presidency on 31 October and Traoré took over as the interim head of state. However, Lieutenant Colonel Yacouba Isaac Zida also staked a claim to be interim head of state citing Traoré's unpopularity. A statement by military chiefs asserted that Zida had their unanimous backing. A coalition of unnamed opposition parties rejected the military takeover. Further protests were called for the morning of 2 November, but were smaller yet there was at least one casualty amidst a police response. The African Union gave the country a fortnight to end military rule from 3 November. By mid-November, a framework was agreed upon unanimously for a transitional executive and legislative administration.

== Background ==
Following an amendment in 2000, the constitution limits presidents to two terms of five years. However, the restrictions were not applied retroactively, allowing President Blaise Compaoré, who had been in office since 1987, to run for a further two terms and be re-elected in 2005 and 2010.

In regards to the 2015 presidential election, Compaoré tried to extend his 27 years in power by enacting a constitutional amendment to lift term limits. As a result, the opposition called for protests against the measure that was sitting in parliament. Some people suggested the move could "spark an uprising".

The Burkinabé Spring also called for change amid a stagnant economy and a non-responsive state, which was met with some concessions. The events magnified a divide, and distrust, between the regular army and the special units, such as the Regiment of Presidential Security.

== Protests ==
=== Initial ===
Protests started in late October. Unnamed opposition called for a blockade of parliament. On 28 October, there were street battles during an anti-government rally by hundreds of thousands of demonstrators. The next day, though, banks, shops and markets reopened. Movement of People for Progress (MPP) member Pargui Emile Paré said that "one thing is certain: we'll march on the parliament [on 30 October]." On 29 October, a mass rally accompanied by street battles took place against a "constitutional coup" involving hundreds of thousands of people.

=== 30 October ===
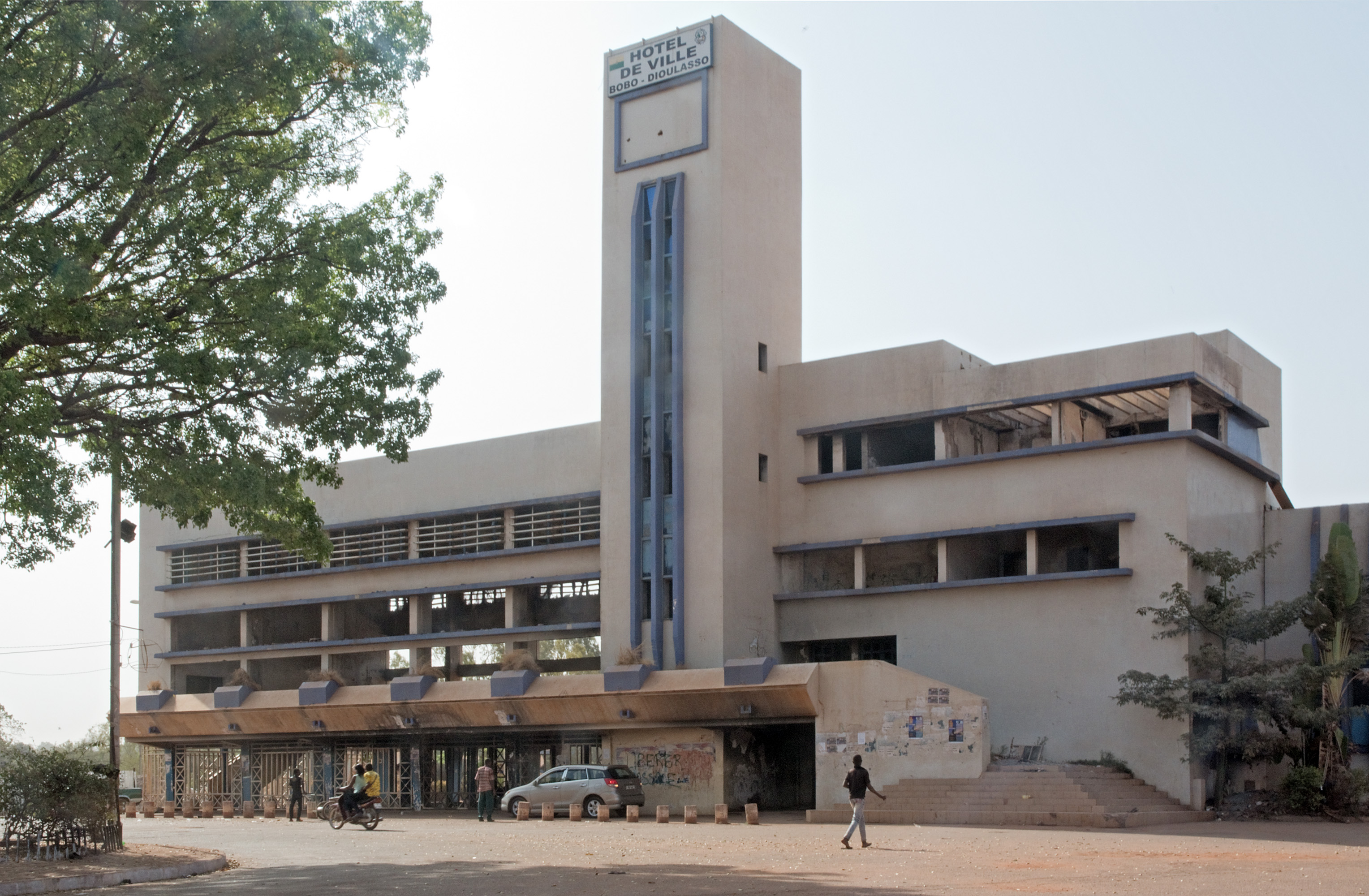
The burnt out skeleton of Bobo-Dioulasso's city hall in February 2018, more than three years after it was set ablaze on 30 October 2014

The most serious events occurred on 30 October with the gathering of tens of thousands of people. Protesters also compared Compaoré to the Ebola virus amidst the 2014 West Africa Ebola outbreak. Police used tear gas to deter the demonstrators, yet they broke through police lines to torch government buildings, including the city hall building, and the ruling Congress for Democracy and Progress (CDP) party's headquarters. The crowd headed to the presidential palace, while the military fired rubber bullets at about 1,500 people storming the National Assembly of Burkina Faso. Protesters burnt documents and stole computer equipment, while cars outside the building were set ablaze. Parts of the parliament building were also on fire, including the Speaker Soungalo Ouattara's office, but the main chamber was untouched. The presidential guard fired on civilians charging into the home of the President's brother, François Compaoré, leading to at least three deaths. The state broadcaster RTB's building for its radio unit, Maison de la Radio (which was under renovation), and television were also stormed. At the television unit's building, protesters posed on the set of the evening news programme, while soldiers were deployed outside the Maison de la Radio with an armored personnel carrier to defend it from the crowd. Five people were reported killed during the day. Some soldiers, including former Defence Minister General Kouamé Lougué, joined the protests. Unnamed opposition activists claimed there had been 30 deaths.

The BBC reported that in an area where MPs live two houses were burning and smoke was billowing from two or three more, while Hotel Azalai was on fire. State-television was off-air, while the 3G network and SMS services were blocked, but internet access and telephones were available. Violent protests also occurred in the country's second largest city Bobo-Dioulasso, including the toppling of statues and the local CDP headquarters, and in Ouahigouya, in the north. Ouagadougou airport was closed and all arriving and departing flights were canceled until further notice.

Many MPs also fled to an unnamed nearby hotel. Opposition MP Ablasse Ouedraogo said: "I was inside when the demonstrators stormed in. I was put in secure place by security people of the parliament. Now it is difficult to say what happens next but things are out of control because the demonstrators do not listen to anyone." General Honoré Nabéré Traoré imposed a night curfew.

=== 31 October ===
Following Diabré's call, the next day, protesters then gathered at Ouagadougou's central Place de la Nation and outside the army headquarters amidst reports of a tense standoff at the latter with chants of "fulfill your responsibilities or we will do so ourselves". By the end of the day Compaoré had resigned and, though there was an initial dispute in the presidency, by 1 November, Zida was declared interim president.

=== Post-resignation ===
On 1 November, Ouagadougou Mayor Simon Compaoré led volunteers on "Operation Mana Mana" (Operation Clean-Clean in Dyula) to clear the streets, which earned him praise on social media. A coalition of unnamed opposition parties also issued a statement that read:

The victory of the popular uprising - and consequently the management of the transition - belongs to the people and should not in any way be confiscated by the army. Our consultation reaffirmed that this transition should be democratic and civilian in character.

Their joint statement also called for a "democratic and civilian transition. The victory born from this popular uprising belongs to the people, and the task of managing the transition falls by right to the people. In no case can it be confiscated by the army."

A demonstration was called at the Place de la Nation for the morning of 2 November. On 1 November, soldiers loyal to Zida patrolled the streets of Ouagadougou after his early morning radio announcement of assuming the role of interim head of state in order to avoid pandemonium during the democratic transition. Protests continued at the Place de la Nation demanding civilian control of a new government instead of a military subversion of what was seen as a grassroots uprising. At the television studio of RTB he said: "This is not a coup d'état but a popular uprising. I salute the memory of the martyrs of this uprising and bow to the sacrifices made by our people." He also called for the African Union and ECOWAS' support for the transition.

In the end, France 24 reported that thousands gathered for the protest, down from the up to a million demonstrators previously, at what has now been nicknamed "Revolution Square." Protesters at RTB's television building were dispersed by soldiers, who sealed off the building, as well as the Place de la Nation. Zida vowed that "any act likely to undermine the transition process will be suppressed with vigor". The army's attempt to clear the protesters resulted in them opening fire at those gathered at the RTB causing one death by a stray bullet, according to the army. The army had also seized control of the building and cleared out all staff; at Place de la Nation barricades were erected as demonstrators against the "power grab" by the military were dispersed. One such placard at the protests equated Zida with Judas. Reports indicated opposition PDC leader Saran Sereme, along with an unnamed army general and a crowd of their supporters, went to the RTB site to declare themselves in charge of the transition. As gunshots were heard, RTB was taken off the air for hours with an unnamed army spokesman saying: "The army does not want power. But the anarchy needs to stop. Any violation will be punished with the utmost energy." The Regiment of Presidential Security then sought to block access to the Place de la Nation. On 4 November, the streets were reportedly calm.

== Response ==
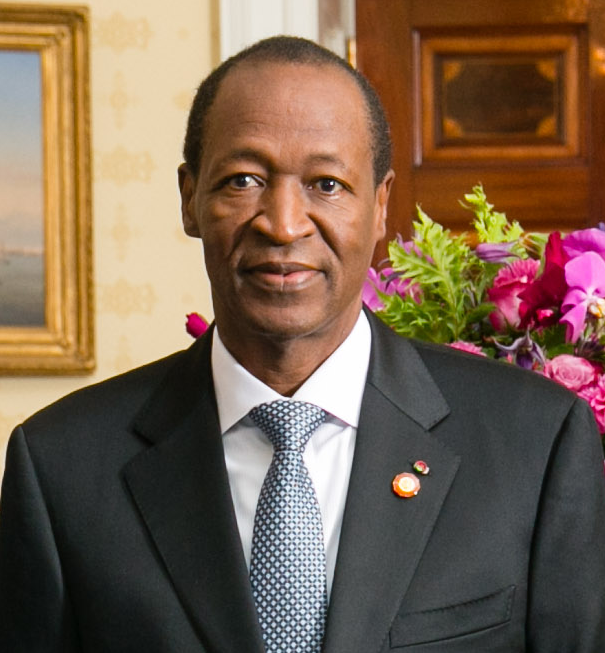
Former President Blaise Compaoré.

Léopold Sédar Senghor International Airport authorities in Dakar were quoted by The Guardian as having confirmed Compaoré was in Senegal, but there was later dispute as to his location, although his presence outside the country was affirmed. A communique read on Radio Omega at 17:00 reported that Compaoré had "dissolved government", declared a state of emergency and made an appeal to "stay calm". He later said he was prepared to leave office at the end of the transition. Compaoré then said that he would retain his position for a year under a transitional government and then hand over power. He also added he was lifting the "state of siege" he had previously declared.

Communications Director Ibrahim Sakande announced the state of emergency with the "chief of the armed forces is in charge of implementing this decision". The reason given by Compaoré was to "create conditions for change", the statement continued. "I'm calling on the leaders of the political opposition to put an end to the protests. I'm pledging from today to open talks with all the actors to end the crisis." Union for Rebirth/Sankarist Movement President Benewende Sankara, who called for the march, said: "The president must deal with the consequences."

Union for Progress and Reform President Zéphirin Diabré called on the military to side with "the people" and called for Compaoré's resignation. Opposition activist Emile Pargui said: "October 30 is Burkina Faso's black spring, like the Arab Spring." Reports in the French media also indicated Compaoré's brother, Francis, was arrested as he tried to flee the country, while Lougué's statements suggested the army may step in to remove Compaoré from power. Opposition figure Simon Compaoré (not related) said: "It is absolutely necessary for Blaise Compaoré to leave power and for a transitional government to take over. Talks are taking place with General Lougue ... but there is no agreement yet." The military command announced it would issue a statement later in the day; other unnamed opposition leaders announced having held talks with Lougué on forming a transitional government. Following Compaoré's pledge to "open talks with all the actors to end the crisis", Armed Forces Chief of Staff General Honoré Nabéré Traoré then made an announcement that a transitional government would run the country until an election within 12 months. He also announced a curfew to be in place from 19:00 to 6:00. The national borders have also been closed. The transitional government would occur after all-party consultations.

Radio Omega FM Ouaga said that "revolution 2.0" (in reference to the popular movement led by Thomas Sankara in 1983, whose eventual overthrow and assassination was blamed on Compaoré) has been called a victory by the opposition.

After the violence peaked on 30 October, the bill was withdrawn from parliament, according to rushed statement by Communications Minister Alain Edouard Traore. Compaoré then also called for "calm and serenity" on Twitter.

=== Resignation ===
Within 24 hours of the 30 October events, Compaoré maintained he was still president and would lead a transitional government. While unnamed international diplomats backed his move, Diabré then called for the demonstrators to occupy public spaces amidst renewed calls for the former's resignation. "The opposition has said and will say again that the precondition for any discussion relating to a political transition is the departure, pure and simple and without condition, of Blaise Compaoré." Rapper Smockey of Le Balai Citoyen told a local radio station that the people were "determined once and for all" to remove Compaoré. His colleague Sams’K Le Jah later said about Compaoré's resignation that the army had adhered to the will of the people. However he also warned against possible abuses by calling on people to "remain vigilant and on high alert, to not let anyone steal the victory of the sovereign people". The group's spokesman Guy Hervé Kam also joined the protests.

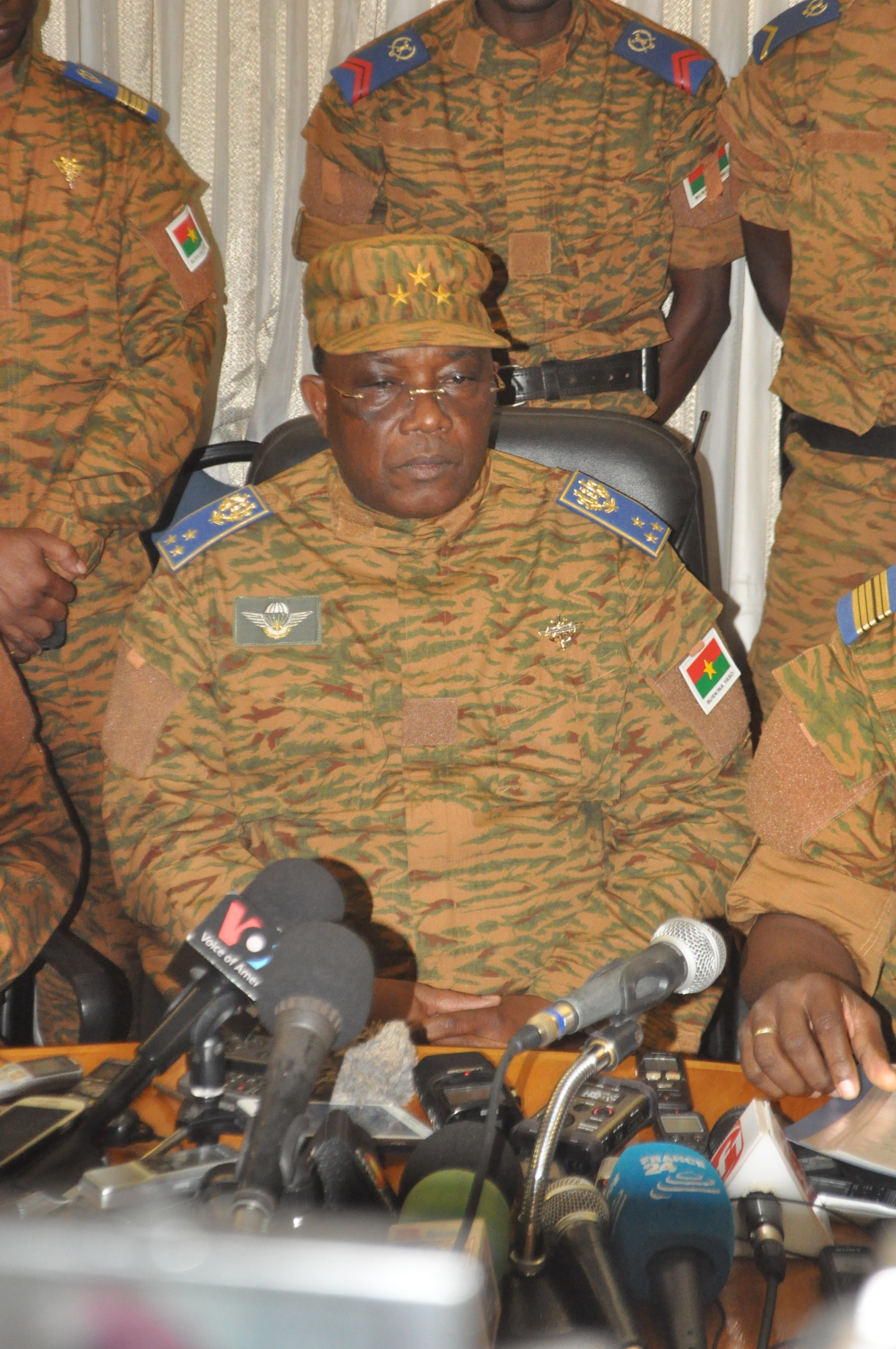
General Traoré on 31 October, announcing he will take interim office.

Later in the day, Compaoré announced he had left the presidency and that there was a "power vacuum;" he also called for a "free and transparent" election within 90 days. His resignation was done on the basis of Article 43 of the constitution of Burkina Faso which states that in case of a vacancy within the presidency, a new election should be held within at least 60–90 days after the official vacancy declaration, a move that some politicians such as Diabré deem difficult to carry out. Protesters then gathered at army headquarters that day then cheered when the announcement was made. Traoré then took over the reins as head of state in an interim capacity. Though demonstrators danced and cheered in Ouagadougou at the announcement of Compaoré's statement being broadcast, the mood cooled on news of Traoré taking interim office. Arsene Evariste Kabore, the former editor-in-chief of state television, suggested people were not happy at the decision as he was Compaoré's aide de camp. Chants were heard calling for Traoré to quit. Some protesters even called for election of Lougué, who was fired by Compaoré in 2003. People's Movement for Progress member, Monou Tapsoaba, said that instead of Traoré "we need someone credibly. Traoré is Blaise Campaoré's henchman." Lieutenant Colonel Yacouba Issaac Zida appeared to challenge Traoré's usurpation of power while aligning himself with the protesters. He announced his own emergency measures and deployed troops on the streets. The next day, a statement was issued by unnamed top military leaders that read: "Lieutenant Colonel Yacouba Issac Zida has been elected unanimously to lead the transition period opened after the departure of President Blaise Compaore." The statement was also signed by Traoré. Zida then said: "The aspirations for democratic change [by the Burkinabè youth] will be neither betrayed, nor disappointed."

By 1 November, Compaoré had fled to Yamoussoukro, Ivory Coast. Though he was en route from the Kosyam Palace, the presidential palace, to Pô on the national highway, they diverted before arriving in Nobéré, 45 kilometres from Pô. While being in constant contact with Ivorian President Alassane Ouattara, the latter sent a helicopter to an unnamed uninhabited area in the afternoon to retrieve him and his entourage. The government of Ivory Coast issued a statement saying that Compaoré was in the country with his family and entourage but did not specify his location. Reuters quoted military sources as saying he was staying at a presidential retreat in Assinie. Unnamed diplomats were also quoted as saying he was alarmed at the possibility of prosecution on human rights charges upon leaving office. Zida also said on television that Compaoré was "in a safe place" and that his "safety and wellbeing are assured". Ouattara said: "As a mediator, he helped his Ivorian brothers resume dialogue... That is why, naturally, we welcome him here, following the painful events that shook our neighbor. We want the transition to take place in a peaceful and constitutional process. President Compaore will stay in Ivory Coast as long as he wishes." France President Francois Hollande acknowledged assisting Compaoré's departure saying it was done in order to prevent a "bloodbath".

=== National unity government ===
On 3 November, Zida said a national unity government would soon rule the country within the framework of the constitution. France 24 suggested Zida was willing to give up power to an MP or a representative of civil society in the coming days, although the lack of a timeframe was noted. The military was considered likely to maintain some influence over the transition. King Mogho Naba of the Mossi people said on 4 November that he had met Zida and "they came to tell us that they would hand back power to civilians. The country should regain peace and quiet." In accordance with the now-suspended constitution, opposition leader Roch Marc Christian Kaboré asserted that the parliament speaker was supposed to be a transitional leader, however Soungalo Ouattara's whereabouts were unknown.

Talks to choose the head of a transitional government, involving political parties and representatives of civil society, mediated by ECOWAS/AU regional leaders, followed. Although the parties involved agreed that the transitional leader should be a civilian and that the original timetable for holding an election in November 2015 should be maintained, there was difficulty in agreeing on a transitional leader and tension between the formerly ruling CDP and those who had opposed Compaoré.

After initial reluctance, the army, represented by Colonel August Denise Barry, participated briefly in continuing talks held on 8 November. It was also reported that, despite objections from the opposition, Zida said in an interview that the CDP must be included in the talks. Jeune Afrique also published an interview with Compaoré in which he alleged that "part of the opposition was working with the army" to plot his overthrow and that "history will tell us if they were right". He added that he would "not wish for his worst enemy" to be in Zida's place.

Zida also dismissed threats from the AU over the two-week deadline to hand power to civilians, as well as the threat of sanctions if it is ignored. Instead Zida said "we are not afraid of sanctions". The military also agreed to hold an election the following year but not on the choice of an interim leader. Zida added that the military "care[s] much more about stability" than threats. He said of the group that "we have waited on the African Union in moments when it should have shown its fraternity and its friendship but instead was not there. It's unfortunate but it's not too late." AU's deputy chairperson, Erastus Mwencha, accused the military of taking advantage of the indecision amongst political parties over the selection of an interim leader. He added that the various parties should "try to reach consensus for the sake of the country" and that the first step towards sanctions would entail Burkina Faso's suspension from the body. Conversely, ECOWAS warned against unilateral sanctions; it also appointed Senegalese President Macky Sall to lead mediation efforts. Ghanaian President John Dramani Mahama also warned against the threat of sanctions: "I am certain that we will not reach the stage where the international community will have to impose sanctions." AU chairman and Mauritanian President Mohamed Ould Abdel Aziz held talks with Zida on 10 November and said that "the African Union has not come to sanction Burkina Faso." He also met unnamed opposition parties and called for a Burkinabe-led solution where all parties should work together "in tranquility, security and social peace". The previous day, the unnamed opposition coalition and civil society organisations agreed on a preliminary blueprint for a transition that included an election in November 2015 with an interim civilian president, a 25-member government and a transitional parliament with 90 seats.

By mid-November, a framework was agreed upon unanimously by political, military and civil leaders, even though a leader was not named. The intention was to return to civilian rule and prepare for the election in 2015. The agreement also entails an interim president chosen by a special college composed of religious, military, political, civil and traditional leaders; the president would then name a prime minister to appoint a 25-minister government and a 90-member national transitional council as a legislative body, while the acting president would be disallowed from contesting the election. Balai Citoyen's Herve Kam said: "Today was the day of compromise. Both soldiers and civilians agree on a civilian transition. The institutions of the transition will be led by civilians." United Nations Secretary-General Ban Ki-moon welcomed and congratulated the adoption of the Charter of the Transition.

== Reactions ==
Supranational

- African Union — A statement was issued expressing "profound concern" over the events and called on all parties to remain calm. Another statement was later issued asserting: "The Chairperson of the Commission...stresses the duty and obligation of the defense and security forces to place themselves at the disposal of the civilian authorities who should lead the transition." The Peace and Security Council met over the situation on 3 November. Its leader, Simeon Oyono Esono, said:
  We ask the armed forces to transfer power to the civil authorities, and the council has determined a period of two weeks for the transfer. The African Union is convinced that the change has been against democracy. However, we know that popular pressure led to the resignation of the president. Having taken note of the origin of the popular revolt which led the military to assume power, we determined a period of two weeks, and after that period we are going to apply sanctions.
- ECOWAS — A statement was issued that expressed concern of a possible coup d'état and that it "would not recognise unconstitutional accessions to power". It further called for "the necessity to respect the principles of democratic and constitutional government".

At the behest of the AU, and under the auspices of ECOWAS, African leaders arrived in the country after 3 November and met opposition politicians, Compaore's supporters, religious leaders and civil society groups. The group included Nigerian President Goodluck Jonathan, Senegal's Macky Sall and Ghana's John Mahama, who led the delegation, arrived in the country to mediate the crisis and seek an interim leader. Unnamed opposition leaders stormed out of a meeting on 5 November with Mathias Tankoano, a member of an unnamed civil society delegation saying: "We can't sit in the same room as those who are to blame for the deaths of the victims whose bodies we have not yet even buried. They should be prosecuted for the deaths and for acts against the constitution that have resulted in violence in our country." Yet the three presidents were scheduled to continue to find a resolution. Union leader Joseph Tiendrebeogo said: "If everyone agrees, there is no reason that the transition shouldn't be done within two weeks." Mahama said that with the election due next year an interim administration could lead the country into the scheduled date with the interim administration ineligible to stand; he was supported by Sall and Jonathan. Shortly after the Burkina Faso uprising, ECOWAS considered a proposal to restrict presidential mandates to a maximum of two terms in office, but after opposition from Togo and Gambia, the idea was abandoned in May 2015.

- European Union — called for scrapping the proposed constitutional amendment. It added that the measure could jeopardise Burkina Faso's stability.
- United Nations — The head of the United Nations Office for West Africa, Mohamed Ibn Chambas, was scheduled to fly to Burkina Faso the next day to try and mediate the crisis. He later said: "We are hoping for a transition led by civilians in line with the constitution. He [Zida] said he will reflect and try to work with the UN, African Union and the Economic Community of West African States, and to find an acceptable agreement which conforms to the constitution." While U.N. Secretary-General Ban Ki-moon backed mediation effort by AU and ECOWAS, U.N. spokesman Stephane Dujarric said consultations with all parties seek "to ensure a democratic civilian-led transition in Burkina Faso. [The mission] will continue its efforts to help resolve the crisis in line with the national constitution."

States

- Belgium — The Foreign Ministry issued a statement reading: "Currently, all travel to Burkina Faso is not advised. Belgians in the country should also avoid demonstrations and rallies, monitor media coverage and learn about current developments."
- France — The European Union statement was echoed, with an appeal for restraint from all sides. Local media reported that the French ambassador had met unnamed opposition leaders. It also "deplored" the violence. France is the former colonial power, which still hosts special forces troops in the country. President François Hollande later said France would "contribute to calming" the situation
- Russia — The Foreign Ministry issued a statement saying that it was "closely monitoring" the situation. "We believe that the solution to domestic issues must be within the legal field. We hope that all the political forces of Burkina Faso to show restraint and political responsibility."
- Taiwan - The Minister of Foreign Affairs stated that relations with Burkina Faso would remain unchanged after Compaoré's resignation. Burkina Faso is one of only 22 states with full diplomatic relations with Taiwan.
- United States — Concern was raised over the proposed constitutional amendment. White House National Security Council spokeswoman Bernadette Meehan issued a statement which said the United States was deeply concerned by the 30 October situation and called on all sides to cease the violence. The embassy in Ouagadougou issued a statement that asserted the United States was "deeply concerned" by the violence and that it had urged "all parties including the security forces" to seek peace. An unnamed U.S. official also said the country urged "a transfer of power in accordance with the constitution".

Pan-African citizenry

Citizens of other African countries, seeing the scenes broadcast across the country, asked if the Burkinabé events were successful whether they could be replicated elsewhere. Social media sites were abuzz with Africans pointing at the respective governments who sought to hold on to power. The Twitter hashtag "#lwili" was used for the Burkinabé events in reference to the traditional Burkinabe cloth Lwili Peendé.

Media

The Guardian said the events could be "a promising break with the trend set by various African rulers finding elasticity in constitutional limits, including Chad, Gabon, Guinea, Namibia, Togo and Uganda." The Christian Science Monitor cited unnamed people terming this an African Spring and that it could serve as a warning to leaders like Rwanda's Paul Kagame who are trying to abolish term limits. Parallels were also drawn with the Arab Spring. Al Jazeera asked if there would be repercussions across West Africa and whether this was an uprising or a coup, though there were no Burkinabé on their panel.

Risk management firm Red24's Ryan Cummings said that "we saw this was a regime that was crumbling" citing Compaoré's loss of support within the military and his own party. He added that "Compaoré as much as he was vilified by the local population he was a key ally of the west... without him there’s no guarantee the status quo will persist. The country itself is quite key for regional stability...There’s going to be a void and that could catalyze a lot of extremist groups and this could see other countries being destabilised." U.K.-based risk consultancy group, Maplecroft's, Maja Bovcon said:

The military in Burkina Faso is very powerful. You should also take into account that Blaise Compaore himself came to power in a military coup [in 1987]. He’s a former officer and he’s also very closely connected to the military. We could describe the regime in Burkina Faso as a kind of mixture of political and military culture. However there are huge divisions – especially between the normal army and the special elite forces. After the 2011 protests, Blaise Compaore became afraid of his own army. Soldiers based in Ouagadougou were not properly equipped, but the presidential guards remained well-armed. It’s curious that Isaac Zida, a member of the presidential guards, has become head of this transitional administration. It will be really interesting to see how Isaac Zida will behave in the future and what is his relationship with the opposition.

== See also ==
- 2015 Burkinabe coup d'état
- List of protests in the 21st century
- 2007-2008 Senegalese protests
- 2008 protests in Burkina Faso
