= 2015 Burkina Faso coup attempt =

2015 Burkina Faso coup d'état
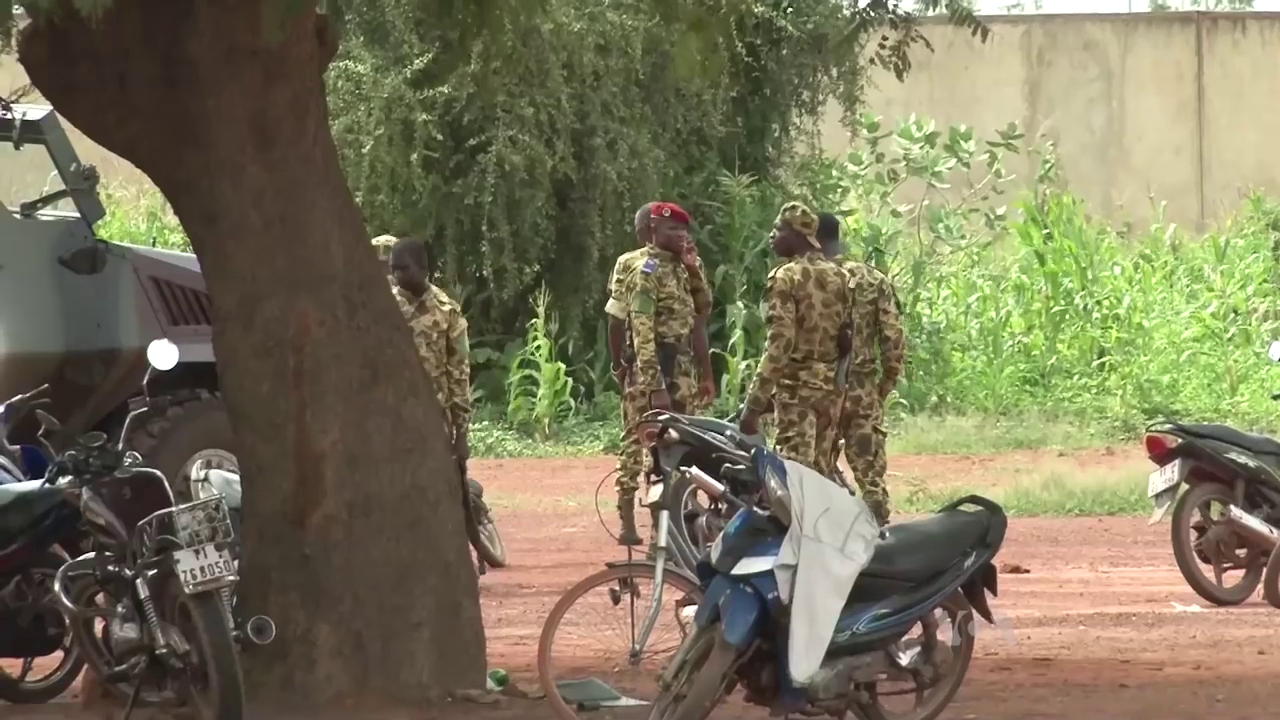
- Soldiers of the RSP patrolling in Ouagadougou during the coup
Date	16 September 2015 – 23 September 2015
Location	Burkina Faso
Result	Coup failed: Regiment of Presidential Security dissolved by caretaker cabinet

Belligerents
Regiment of Presidential Security	Government of Burkina Faso

Commanders and leaders
General Gilbert Diendéré	Michel Kafando; Yacouba Isaac Zida

Casualties and losses
- 11 killed in total

The 2015 Burkina Faso coup attempt was a failed coup d'état launched on 16 September 2015 in Burkina Faso, when members of the Regiment of Presidential Security (RSP) – a controversial autonomous military unit, formed under President Blaise Compaoré – detained the country's government. Among those detained were the transitional President Michel Kafando, Prime Minister Yacouba Isaac Zida (who was also the former deputy commander of the RSP), and numerous members of the cabinet. This transitional government was formed in the wake of the 2014 Burkinabé uprising, when a popular movement overthrew the long-time president Compaoré, who himself had come to power in a 1987 coup against the left-wing leader Thomas Sankara. New general elections were planned for 11 October 2015.

The RSP was successful in seizing control of Ouagadougou and proclaimed the establishment of a new junta, headed by General Gilbert Diendéré, to oversee the transition to new elections. The coup leaders denounced the transitional government's electoral law, which barred supporters of Compaoré from participating in the elections, and promised to allow all prospective candidates to run. However, the junta failed to consolidate its authority across the country, and faced protests as well as intense pressure from regional leaders, and eventually from the regular army, to restore the transitional government. Ultimately, after the regular army entered Ouagadougou to confront the RSP, Kafando was restored as president on 23 September 2015.

== Background ==
In the days immediately prior to the coup, the Regiment of Presidential Security (which has previously been involved in several alleged coup d'état attempts during the Compaoré administration) had come under intense public scrutiny. On 14 September 2015, it was reported that a commission charged with proposing post-uprising reforms had come to the conclusion that the RSP should be dismantled and its members redeployed. The report, submitted to Prime Minister Zida, described the RSP as "an army within an army".

== The coup ==
While one senior military source stated that the soldiers that apprehended the government members had made no demands, a civil society activist reported that they had demanded the resignation of transitional President Kafando. Chérif Sy, President of the National Transitional Council, soon published a statement saying that dialogue was under-way between the military leadership and the "elements of the RSP" responsible for the coup, and noted that the country was in danger. Le Balai Citoyen, a grassroots Sankarist movement heavily involved in the 2014 uprising, called for the inhabitants of Ouagadougou to gather on the Revolution Square to protest the events. After hundreds of protesters assembled outside of the presidential palace, soldiers fired warning shots to disperse them. They retreated, but did not disperse. Some were beaten back using batons, and gunfire was reported in the Ouaga 2000 neighborhood. Slogans such as "Down with the RSP" and "We want elections" were chanted by the protesters. The private station Radio Omega reported having been forcibly shut down by the Regiment of Presidential Security, and several other radio stations also went off air.

In response to the coup, about 20 French soldiers from an intelligence gathering unit were deployed to Ouagadougou. Several international organizations condemned the events, with the United Nations, African Union and Economic Community of West African States (ECOWAS) calling for those detained to be released, and voicing support for the country's democratic transition.

On 17 September 2015, the coup leaders announced that they were dismissing Kafando, dissolving the government and the transitional legislature, and setting up a new transitional body, the National Council for Democracy (French: Conseil national pour la Démocratie – CND), to lead the country to "inclusive and peaceful elections". In their proclamation of the CND, they denounced the transitional authorities for their allegedly undemocratic electoral law, which barred anyone who supported a 2014 proposal to eliminate term limits from standing in the October 2015 election, and for ignoring the recommendations of ECOWAS to scrap the exclusionary law. General Gilbert Diendéré was appointed chairman of the council.

Later in the day, Diendéré said that Compaoré had nothing to do with the coup and that the coup was supported by the rest of the army. He called for calm "so that we can continue on the path to inclusive and democratic elections" and appealed to the international community: "We know a coup is never accepted by the international community, but we ask it to understand the purpose of our action. We are committed to dialogue and accept certain principles of the international community." He stressed that he had no interest in politics and was only getting involved due to the "special situation", and he said that power would be returned to civilians "as soon as conditions are there". In other comments, he said that presidential and parliamentary elections would be held on a new timetable, which would be determined through consultations with "the concerned actors, notably the political parties and civil society organisations". He also promised that the exclusionary electoral law would be changed so that all political forces could participate.

On 18 September 2015, Diendéré said that Kafando had been released and Zida was under house arrest. The country's borders, which had been closed after the coup, were reopened. On the same day, the African Union suspended Burkina Faso and placed sanctions on the coup leaders. Two regional leaders—Macky Sall, the President of Senegal and Chairman of ECOWAS, and Boni Yayi, the President of Benin—travelled to Ouagadougou to hold talks with Diendéré.

Following further talks on 19 September, Boni Yayi said that "good news" would be announced the next day. On 20 September, supporters of the coup violently burst into the lobby of the hotel where the talks were being held. Later in the day, a draft agreement was announced that would involve allowing the previously excluded candidates to participate in the election, thereby granting one of the CND's key demands. It granted amnesty to those who participated in the coup and required the release of those who were detained by the CND. It also allowed a delay in the holding of the election, but required that it be held by 22 November. The two sides appeared to still disagree about who would lead the transition: the draft agreement called for restoring Kafando as president, but the CND insisted that Diendéré should continue in his post for the remainder of the transitional period.

== Resistance and failure of the coup ==
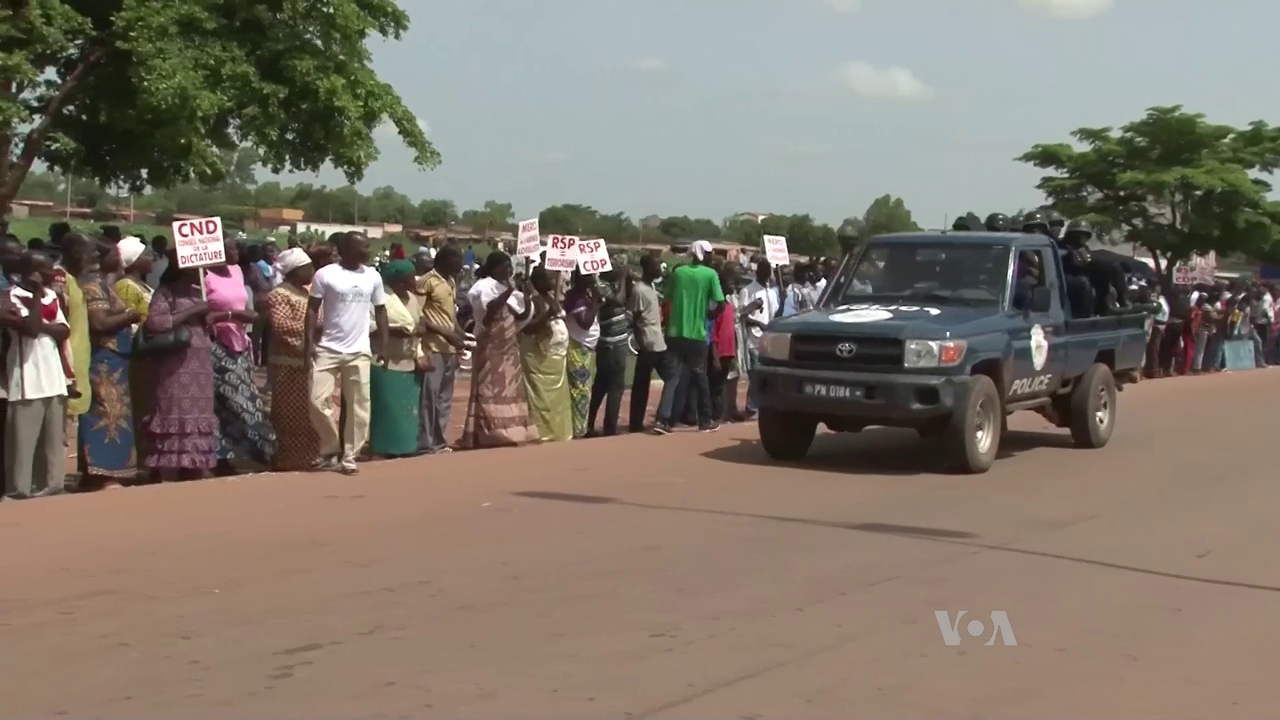
Protest against the RSP in Ouagadougou.

The CND never clearly established its authority beyond Ouagadougou, and on 21 September army leaders announced that soldiers from the regular army were marching towards the capital to put an end to the coup. Diendéré announced plans to release Zida as a conciliatory gesture. Facing the prospect of a confrontation with the regular army as well as ongoing street protests by opponents of the coup, who felt that the proposed terms offered too many concessions to the coup leaders, Diendéré said that the CND would abide by the draft agreement's provision for the return of civilian rule. He said that the crisis could lead to "chaos, civil war, and massive human rights violations" if not resolved peacefully.

The military chief of staff, Brigadier General Pingrenoma Zagré, called on members of the RSP to lay down their arms, promising in a statement that they would not be harmed if they surrendered peacefully. In Bobo-Dioulasso, people reported seeing regular army soldiers en route to Ouagadougou, and people in Koudougou showed support for the soldiers passing through. Soldiers from the regular army entered Ouagadougou later on 21 September, facing no resistance from the RSP.

Although the CND had previously announced Kafando's release, he was believed to remain under house arrest until 21 September, when he was reported to have arrived at the residence of the French ambassador. The army reportedly began negotiating with the RSP after reaching Ouagadougou. Speaking to the BBC, Diendéré said that Kafando would be restored as president when the draft agreement was formally approved by ECOWAS. He dismissed the possibility of surrender, saying that the CND wanted "to continue the discussions" and was "ready to implement ECOWAS' decisions." The regular army issued an ultimatum to the RSP to surrender by the morning of 22 September. Diendéré warned that the RSP would defend itself if necessary but stressed that he wanted a peaceful resolution.

The army's deadline for the RSP to surrender passed without fighting as negotiations continued between the two sides. Later in the day on 22 September, they reached a deal: the RSP would withdraw to its barracks and the regular army would withdraw from the city, and the army promised that members of the RSP would not be harmed. ECOWAS leaders planned to travel to Ouagadougou on 23 September for Kafando's restoration as president.

Kafando was reinstalled as president at a ceremony on 23 September in the presence of ECOWAS leaders. Isaac Zida also returned to his post as prime minister. Zida said that he foresaw a delay of "several weeks" in the holding of the election. For his part, Diendéré said that the coup was a mistake and that "we knew the people were not in favour of it. That is why we have given up."

== Aftermath ==
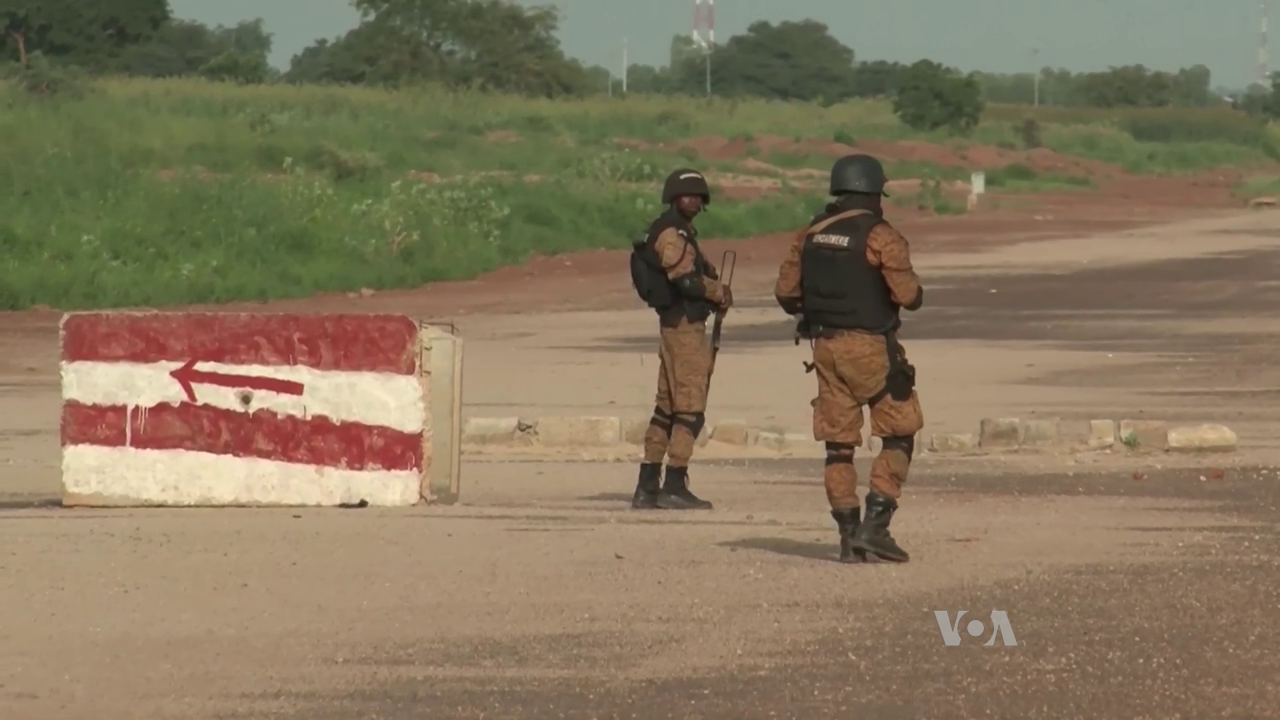
Burkinabé gendarmes protect the presidential palace, 29 September 2015.

Eleven people died, and more than 250 were injured during the coup. In the first cabinet meeting afterwards, held on 25 September, the Minister of Security was dismissed and the position of head of the president's military council was abolished. A commission was created to identify those involved in the coup and given thirty days to report. The President of Guinea, Alpha Condé, called it the "stupidest coup in the world".

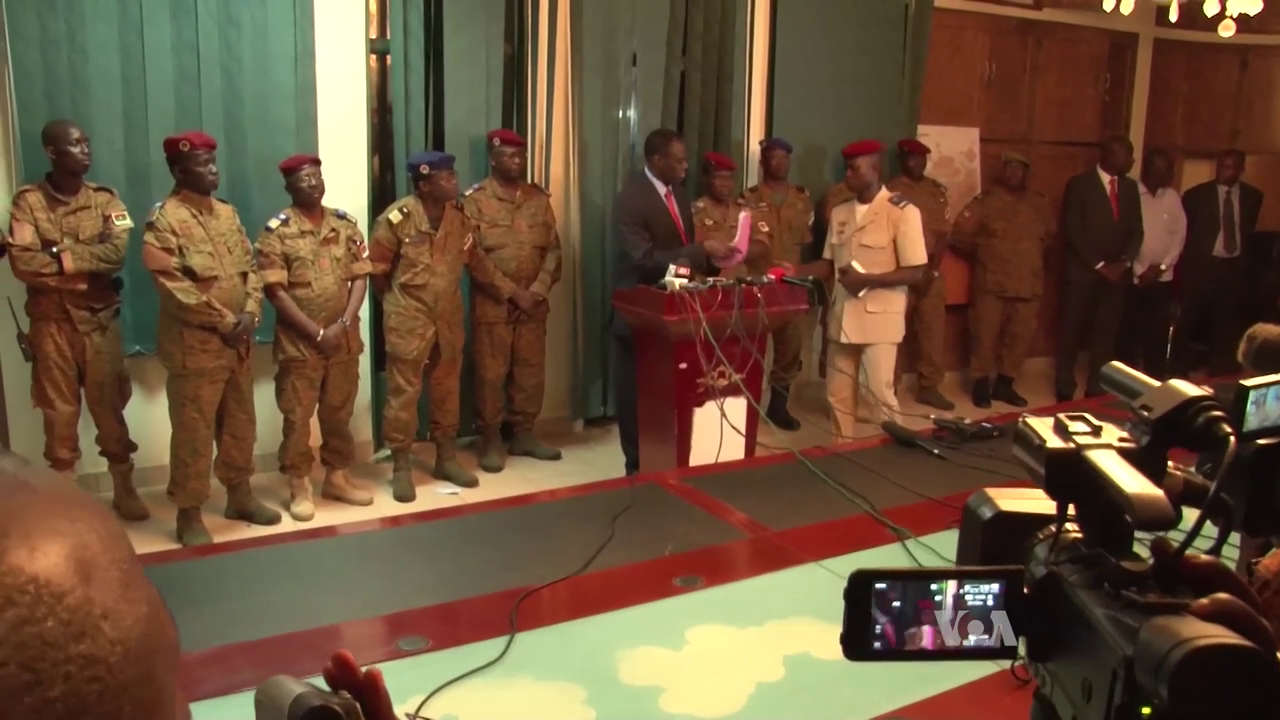
Press conference of President Kafando after the failure of the coup, 30 September 2015.

On 25 September the Regiment of Presidential Security was disbanded by government decree, as recommended shortly before the coup. On 26 September the assets of Diendéré and others associated with the coup were frozen by the state prosecutor.

On 28 September, the army chief of staff accused the RSP of failing to comply with the disarmament ordered by the government. Each side accused the other of acting belligerently during the process. Diendéré downplayed the tensions and said the process would continue. However, he said that RSP members needed their weapons for their own security, arguing that the government had failed to honor the guarantees for their safety.

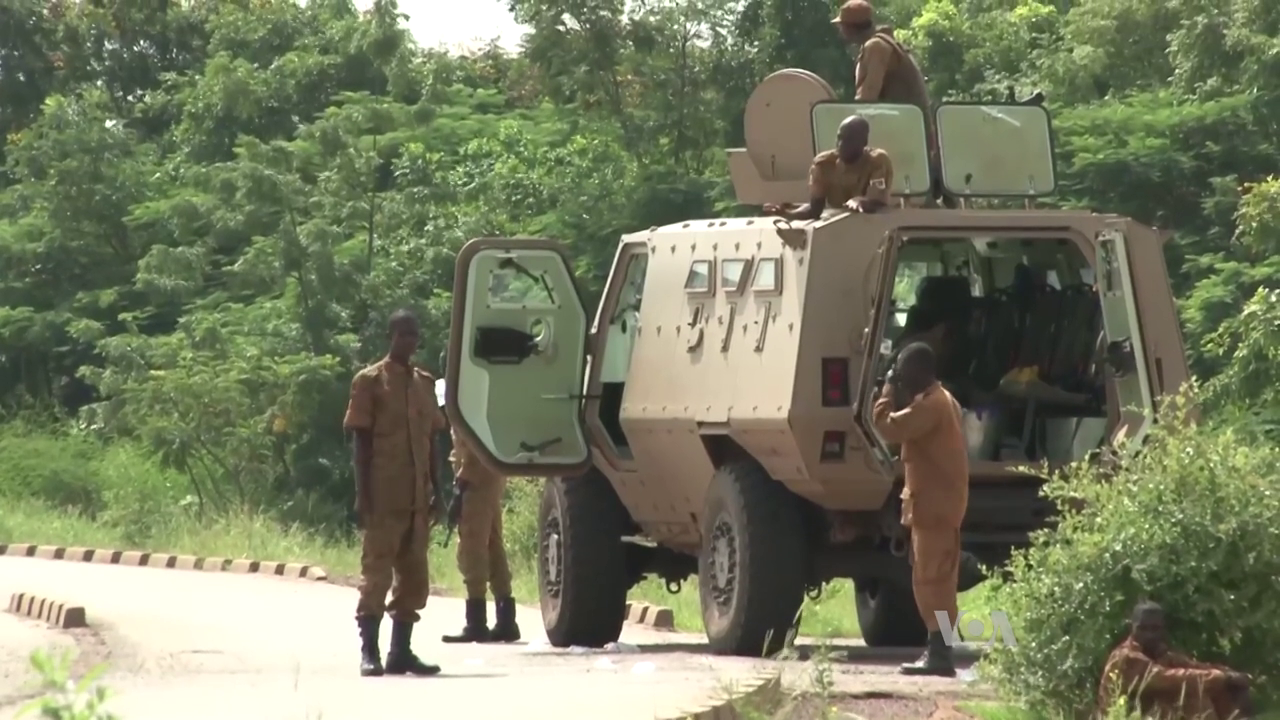
A Bastion APC of the loyalist forces during the assault against the RSP base, 29 September.

The army surrounded the RSP base in the Ouaga 2000 neighborhood of Ouagadougou on 29 September and attacked it, seizing control of the base "without much resistance". Diendéré said that he had tried to get his troops to disarm before the army's assault, but many of them refused to do so. Diendéré apparently fled to the Vatican embassy. After the government assured the Vatican that Diendéré would not be killed, he was turned over and taken into custody by the government on 1 October, escorted by former President Jean-Baptiste Ouédraogo.

Diendéré and Djibril Bassolé, who served as Minister of Foreign Affairs until Compaoré's ouster, were charged with a variety of crimes on 6 October: murder, attacking state security, collusion with foreign forces to destabilise internal security, causing intentional injury, and intentional destruction of property. Bassolé, whose attempt to stand as a presidential candidate was rejected by the transitional authorities, had previously been arrested for alleged complicity in the coup, although he insisted he was innocent. Two other politicians were also arrested late on 5 October: Léonce Koné of the Congress for Democracy and Progress (CDP) and Hermann Yaméogo of the National Union for Democracy and Development. Colonel Sidi Paré, who had served under the transitional government as Minister-Delegate for Security, was reportedly arrested on 6 October.

Members of the RSP were reassigned elsewhere in the military following the RSP's dissolution, and the government announced on 7 October that about 30 members of the RSP, out of a total of about 1,300, had not showed up for their new assignments. They were therefore "presumed guilty" and deemed "at large". Another politician, CDP Vice-President Achille Tapsoba, was arrested on 8 October.

Colonel Sita Sangare, the Director of Military Justice, stated on 16 October that 23 people had been charged with various crimes in connection with the coup. Diendéré was charged with 11 crimes, including "crimes against humanity", and Bassolé was charged with six. Sangare said that defendants convicted of murder could potentially be executed. He also said that Fatou Diendéré, a CDP politician married to General Diendéré, would face trial as well if she was found, although she was thought to have left the country.

CDP President Eddie Komboïgo—who, like Bassolé, had been barred from standing as a presidential candidate—stayed in the United States after the failure of the coup, but he was arrested on 22 January 2016 upon returning to Burkina Faso. Komboïgo and Diendéré's daughter-in-law Fatoumata Thérèse Diawara were released on 30 May 2016, although the charges against them remained in place. Léonce Koné, the last CDP leader still being held, was granted provisional release on 20 July 2016.

In December 2024, the government declared an amnesty for people convicted for participating in the coup attempt.

== See also ==
- 2016 Burkinabé coup d'état attempt
- History of Burkina Faso
