= National Council for Democracy =

The National Council for Democracy (French: Conseil national pour la Démocratie), led by Chairman-General Gilbert Diendéré, was the ruling cabinet of the military junta of Burkina Faso from 17 to 23 September 2015. It took temporary control of the preceding cabinet led by Interim President Michel Kafando in the 2015 Burkinabé coup d'état.

== History ==
On the evening of 16 September 2015, members of the Regiment of Presidential Security (RSP) stormed a cabinet meeting of the Government and seized interim President Michel Kafando, Prime Minister Isaac Zida and other officials. The next morning, Lieutenant Colonel Mamadou Bamba appeared on television announcing the National Council for Democracy to "put an end" to "the deviant regime of transition".

On the same day, General Gilbert Diendéré was named Chairman of the Council. Diendéré claimed to be acting in the interest of Burkina Faso, saying that the upcoming elections under the transitional government's electoral law would be too divisive because supporters of former President Blaise Compaoré were barred from running. He promised inclusive elections in which no one would be barred from running for political reasons.

The National Council for Democracy failed to consolidate its authority across the country and faced pressure from regional leaders, and eventually from the regular army, to restore the transitional government. After the army entered Ouagadougou to confront the RSP, Kafando was reinstalled as president on 23 September and Zida also returned to his post as prime minister. Diendéré said that the coup was a mistake and that "we knew the people were not in favour of it. That is why we have given up."
