= Simon Compaoré =

Burkinabé politician (born 1952)

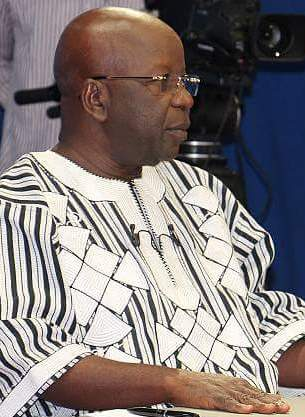
- Simon Compaoré

Minister of State for Internal Security
- Incumbent
- Assumed office January 2016

Minister for Territorial Administration
- In office January 2016 – February 2017

Mayor of Ouagadougou
- In office 1995–2012

Personal details
- Born: 19 September 1952 (age 74)
- Party: MPP

Simon Compaoré (born 19 September, 1952) is a Burkinabé politician who served as Mayor of Ouagadougou, the capital of Burkina Faso, from 1995 to 2012. He was a prominent member of the ruling Congress for Democracy and Progress (CDP), but he left the CDP and participated in the formation of the opposition People's Movement for Progress (MPP) in 2014. Following the MPP's victory in the 2015 election, he was appointed to the government. He has served as Minister of State for Internal Security since January 2016, and he also held the ministerial portfolio for territorial administration from January 2016 to February 2017.

== Life and career ==
Compaoré was born in Ouagadougou. He became mayor of the capital in 1995. He was a prominent member of the ruling CDP and in 1997 served as its Secretary General. He was re-elected as Mayor of Ouagadougou in 2000 and was additionally elected to the National Assembly in the May 2002 parliamentary election. He was re-elected as Mayor in 2005 and re-elected to the National Assembly in the May 2007 parliamentary election.

Compaoré, along with a number of other prominent figures in the CDP, announced his resignation from the party on 6 January 2014. Those who resigned said that the party was being run in an undemocratic and damaging manner, and expressed opposition to plans to amend the constitution to eliminate term limits, which would allow President Blaise Compaoré to stand for re-election in 2015. A new opposition party led by the prominent CDP members who resigned, the People's Movement for Progress (MPP), was founded on 25 January 2014. Roch Marc Christian Kaboré was President of the MPP, while Simon Compaoré was its Second Vice-President.

After Kaboré was elected as President of Burkina Faso, Simon Compaoré was appointed to the government as Minister of State for Territorial Administration and Internal Security on 12 January 2016. Within days, he faced a serious security threat when Islamist militants attacked a hotel in Ouagadougou on 15 January.

In the government appointed on 20 February 2017, Compaoré's responsibilities were reduced, as Siméon Sawadogo was appointed to replace him as Minister of Territorial Administration, but he retained the portfolio as Minister of State for Internal Security.
