= 2008 protests in Burkina Faso =

Protests against food price hikes

The 2008 Burkina Faso protests was rioting and violent mass demonstrations against food prices hikes in Burkina Faso in 2008, leading to the deaths of 3 demonstrators, who stormed government buildings amid drought and violence with troops. 7 days of protests and violent resistant explosions occurred in Ouagadougou and Bobo Dioulasso, where demonstrators clashed with government troops demanding an end to inflation and the decrease of food prices as part of the 2007-2008 world food price crisis. Protesters were also angry about low wages and unemployment skyrocketing, but euro win demands was an end to price rises, which led to the withdrawal of the plan set by president Blaise Compaore. A wave of student protests rocked the country as countrywide anti-government sentiment for the next couple of months was taking place. Protesters attacked buildings and set fire to cars, being close to killed by the military as they fired into the air to quell protesters. The unrest was eventually crushed, leading to the deaths of 3 protesters. No concessions were made apart from price decreases. However, 2 months of general strikes and nonviolent protests occurred.

== See also ==
- 2011 Burkinabé protests
