= Honoré Traoré =

Burkinabé soldier and politician (1957–2026)

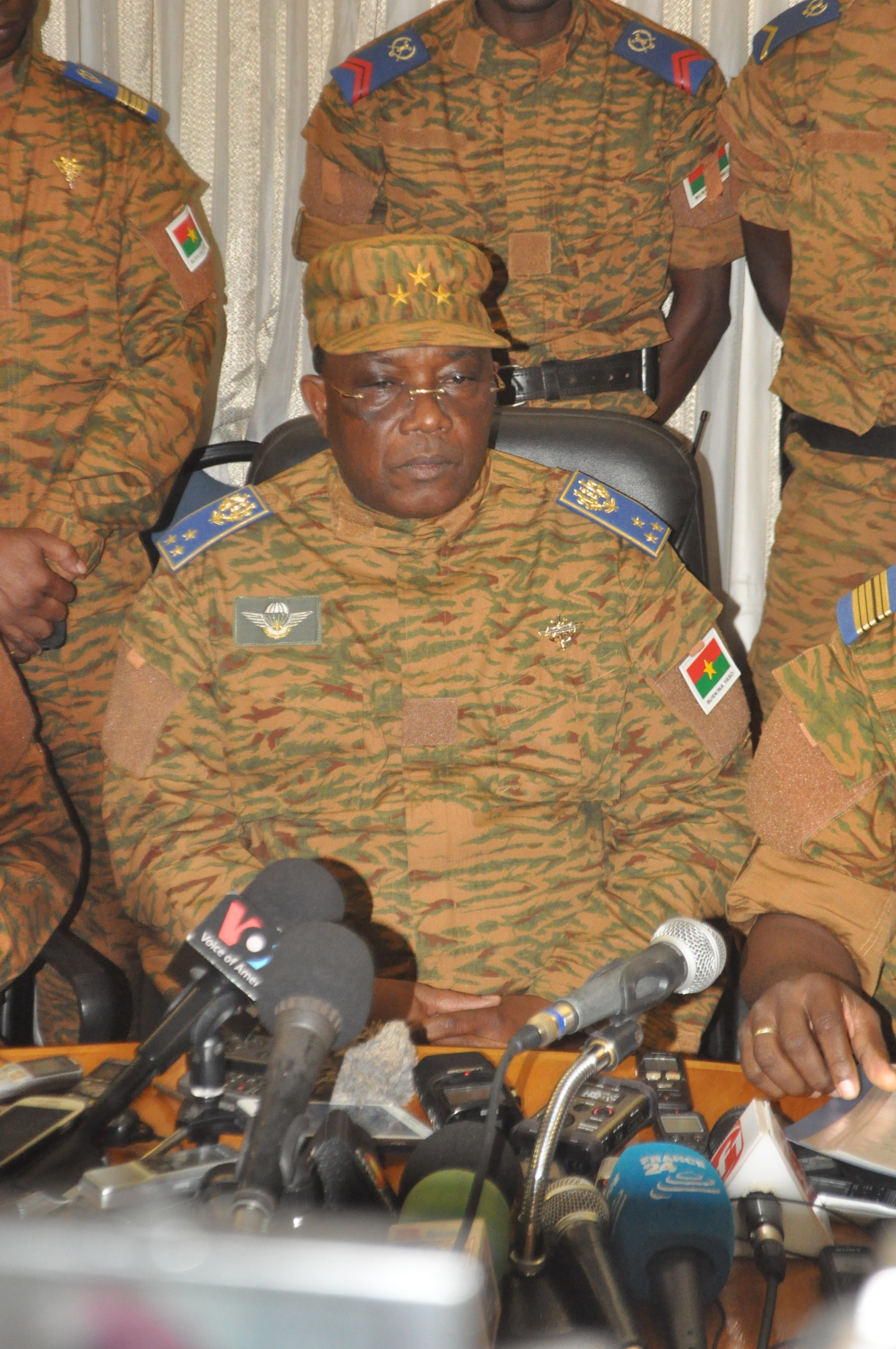
- Traoré in 2014

Interim Head of State of Burkina Faso
- In office 31 October 2014 – 1 November 2014
- Preceded by: Blaise Compaoré (as President)
- Succeeded by: Isaac Zida (as interim head of state)

Personal details
- Born: Honoré Nabéré Traoré; 28 September 1957 Dédougou, French Upper Volta, French West Africa
- Died: 25 May 2026 (aged 68) Ouagadougou, Burkina Faso
- Party: Independent

Military service
- Allegiance: Burkina Faso
- Branch/service: Army of Burkina Faso
- Rank: General

Honoré Nabéré Traoré (28 September 1957 – 25 May 2026) was a Burkinabé army general who served as the interim head of state of Burkina Faso for one day, from 31 October to 1 November 2014, following the overthrow of Blaise Compaoré's government in the 2014 Burkina Faso uprising.

== Early life and education ==
Traoré was born in Dédougou, French Upper Volta, French West Africa, on 28 September 1957. He completed first-cycle military education at the Kadiogo Military Academy (Prytanée militaire de Kadiogo), and second-cycle education at the Saint-Louis Military Academy (Prytanée militaire de Saint-Louis) in Senegal. Between 1978 and 1981, he underwent officer training at the Meknes Royal Military Academy in Morocco.

He was passionate about football, playing the sport in primary school and the Kadiogo Military Academy. He idolized Malian footballer Salif Keïta.

== Career ==
Before the 1987 coup d'état, in which Blaise Compaoré became head of state, Traoré served as the deputy commander of the 2nd Military Region of the Burkina Faso Armed Forces. A year after the coup, he was appointed as Compaoré's aide-de-camp. He went on to serve as the commanding officer in Fada N'gourma, head of the Georges Namoano Military Academy, and Director of Sports, Arts, and Culture of the National Armed Forces. He briefly traveled to France to attend the War College (École de guerre - Terre), before returning to Burkina Faso to continue his military career.

He later became president of the West African Liaison Office (OLAO), while serving on the International Military Sports Council. He also chaired the US des Forces Armées. From 1997 to 2002, he was president of the Burkinabé Football Federation. During his term, Burkina Faso hosted the 1998 African Cup of Nations. In July 2009, he was appointed commander of the Central Army Group with the rank of colonel, replacing Kodio Lougué.

During the 2011 Burkina Faso protests, Traoré was one of the few soldiers trusted by Compaoré, and was thus appointed as Chief of the General Staff of the Armed Forces on 15 April, despite not being a general at the time. He was promoted to brigadier general the day after, and later to major general, before officially taking office on 19 April. He held his rank until the 2014 Burkina Faso uprising.

=== Interim head of state ===
During the uprising, Traoré was a key figure in ordering the dissolution of the government. He announced a 12-month transitional government to restore stability and a curfew from 6:00 a.m. to 7:00 p.m. on 30 October. One day later, Compaoré announced his resignation as president, and minutes after, the military proclaimed Traoré as head of state, stating that he would serve for a transitional period of 60–90 days until elections could be held. However, officers led by Lt. Col. Yacouba Isaac Zida, Traoré's subordinate, challenged his rule, closing the country's borders and imposing a curfew. On 1 November, Zida took over as interim head of state to "ensure a smooth, democratic transition", describing Traoré as "obsolete". A few weeks later, Michel Kafando was chosen to replace Zida as transitional head of state.

== Personal life ==
Traoré was married and had two children. He died in Ouagadougou on 25 May 2026, at the age of 68.
