= Soungalo Ouattara =

Burkinabé politician

Soungalo Apollinaire Ouattara (born 31 December 1956) is a Burkinabé politician who was President of the National Assembly of Burkina Faso from 2012 to 2014. Previously he served in the government as Minister of the Civil Service and State Reform from 2008 to 2012.

== Life and career ==
Ouattara was born in Bobo-Dioulasso and worked as a civil servant. He became a civil administrator in 1983 and from 1983 to 1984 he was Prefect-Mayor of Réo, as well as Acting High Commissioner of Sanguié Province. He was Secretary-General of Passoré Province and Gnagna Province from 1984 to 1988, as well as Prefect-Mayor of Bogandé and Prefect of Thyon.

Ouattara served as Secretary-General of the Ministry of Territorial Administration and Security from 1988 to 1994 and as Permanent Secretary of the National Decentralization Commission from 1994 to 1995. Subsequently, he was Secretary-General of the Presidency from 1995 to 2006. He was appointed as Minister-Delegate under the Minister of Territorial Administration and Decentralization, in charge of Local Collectivities, on 6 January 2006, and he was subsequently promoted to the position of Minister of the Civil Service and State Reform on 3 September 2008. He is a member of the Political Bureau of the Congress of Democracy and Progress (CDP).

A book written by Ouattara, Local Governance and Freedoms: For an African Renaissance (Gouvernance et libertés locales – Pour une renaissance de l’Afrique), was published by Karthala Editions in November 2007.

Ouattara served as Minister of the Civil Service for four years. In the December 2012 parliamentary election, he was elected to the National Assembly as a candidate in Houet Province. When the National Assembly began sitting for its new parliamentary term, Ouattara was elected as President of the National Assembly on 28 December 2012. He received 96 votes, while the opposition candidate for the post, Denis Nikiéma, received 30 votes.

During mass protests against plans to change the constitution to allow President Blaise Compaoré to run for another term, angry protesters attacked the National Assembly on 30 October 2014 and set it on fire, preventing a planned vote on the change. Later in the day, the military, apparently taking control of the country, announced that the National Assembly was dissolved; Compaoré was forced to resign the next day. Legally, Compaoré's resignation meant that the President of the National Assembly should succeed him in an interim capacity, but the National Assembly had already been dissolved; in any case, the military, under Isaac Zida, had taken power, and it seemed impossible that the crowds so hostile to Compaoré would accept Ouattara, a long-time Compaoré loyalist, as a successor.
