= Kady Traoré =

Burkinabé actress (born 1979)

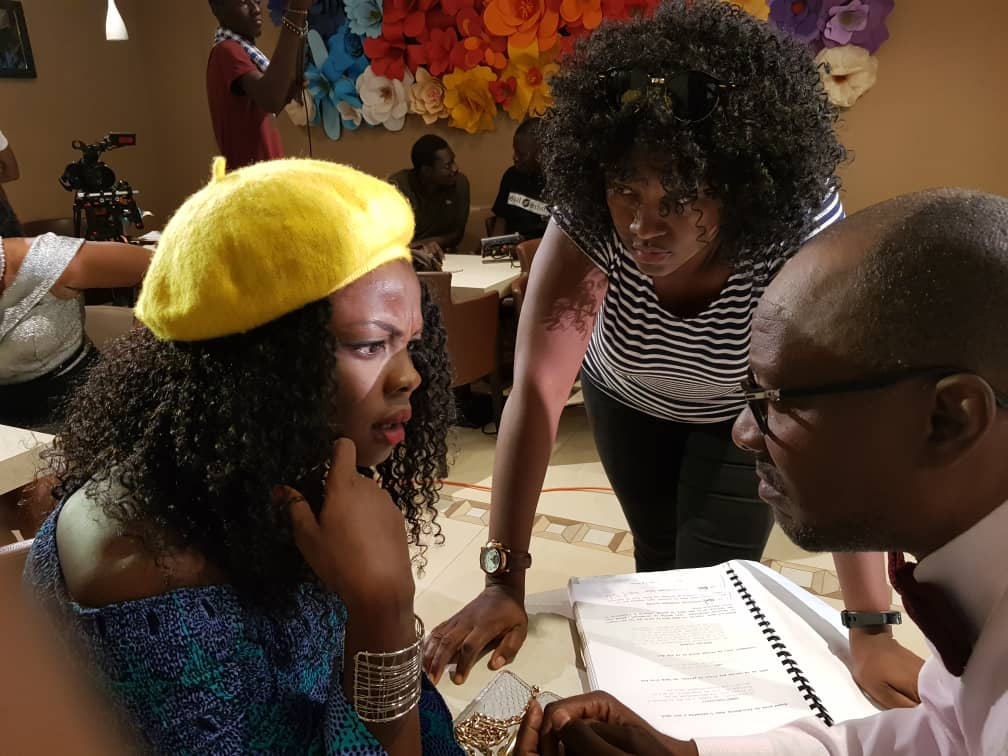
- Born: March 18, 1979 (age 47); Bobo-Dioulasso, Upper Volta
- Occupations: Actress, film director, producer
- Years active: 1998-present
- Spouse: Serge Martin Bambara
- Children: 2

Kady Traoré (born 18 March 1979) is a Burkinabé actress, film director, and film producer.

== Biography ==
Traoré was born in Bobo-Dioulasso in 1979. She studied at ISIS (Higher Institute of Image and Sound) in Ouagadougou.

She made her acting debut in 1998, in the TV series A nous la vie, directed by Toussaint Tiendrébéogo. In 2001, Traoré appeared in Issouf Tapsoba's TV series Les jeunes branchés. The same year, she starred in Gomtiogo. In 2008, she played Timy, the half sister of Ousmane who has a relationship with Inspector Marc, in the police drama series Super flics.

In 2014, Traoré directed A vendre, her first feature film. It tells the story of a man who is selling his house and pool and screens his buyers, until finally selling to a young couple. The man ends up falling in love with the young wife. She directed Conflit conjugal in 2017, which was one of two films to receive the Succès Cinema Burkina Faso award at the Panafrican Film and Television Festival of Ouagadougou. In 2018, Traoré directed Prejuge, which was produced using a grant from the Ouaga Film Lab. She founded the production company Athena Films.

== Personal life ==
Traoré married the rapper Smockey (Serge Martin Bambara) on 31 January 2008. The couple have two children.

== Filmography ==
=== Actress ===
- 1998 : A nous la vie (TV series)
- 2001 : Les jeunes branchés (TV series)
- 2001 : Gomtiogo
- 2004 : Traque à Ouaga
- 2005 : Dossier brûlant
- 2005 : Code phénix
- 2006 : L’or des Younga
- 2008 : Super flics as Timy (TV series)
- 2014 : Waga love as Sandra (TV series)

=== Director ===
- 2014 : A vendre
- 2017 : Conflit conjugal
- 2018 : Prejuge
- 2019 : Femme au Foyer (TV series)
