= Michel Kafando =

Burkinabé diplomat

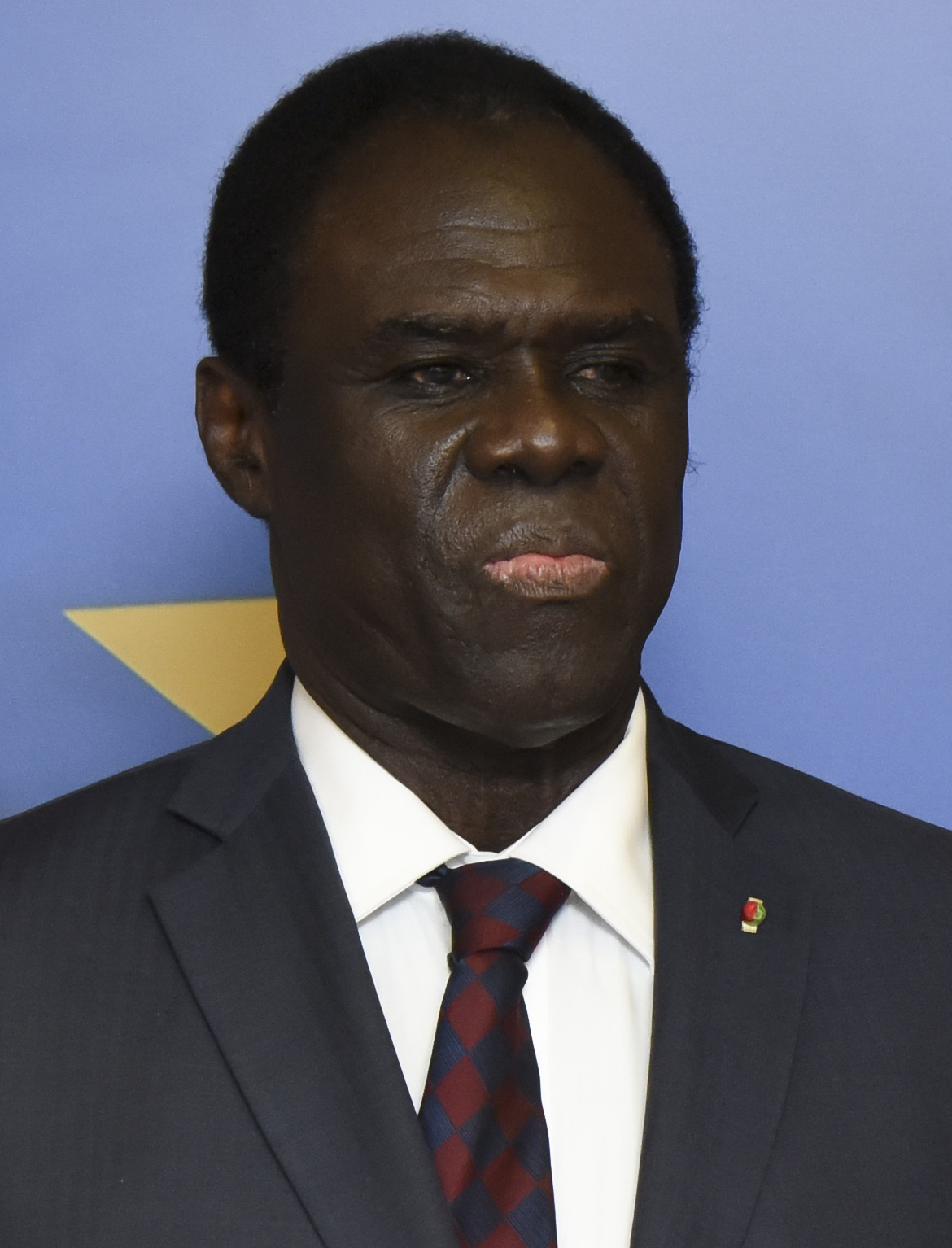
- Kafando in 2015

President of Burkina Faso
- Interim
- In office 23 September 2015 – 29 December 2015
- Prime Minister: Yacouba Isaac Zida
- Preceded by: Gilbert Diendéré (as Chairman of the National Council for Democracy); Chérif Sy (Acting)
- Succeeded by: Roch Marc Christian Kaboré
- In office 18 November 2014 – 17 September 2015
- Prime Minister: Yacouba Isaac Zida
- Preceded by: Yacouba Isaac Zida
- Succeeded by: Gilbert Diendéré (as Chairman of the National Council for Democracy); Chérif Sy (Acting)

Ambassador of Burkina Faso to the United Nations
- In office 15 April 1998 – 5 July 2011
- President: Blaise Compaoré
- Preceded by: Gaëtan Rimwanguiya Ouédraogo
- Succeeded by: Der Kogda

Minister of Foreign Affairs
- In office 30 September 1982 – 4 August 1983
- President: Saye Zerbo; Jean-Baptiste Ouédraogo
- Preceded by: Félix Tientarboum
- Succeeded by: Hama Arba Diallo

Personal details
- Born: 18 August 1942 (age 84) Ouagadougou, Upper Volta (now Burkina Faso)
- Spouse: Marie Kafando
- Education: University of Bordeaux; Sciences Po; Graduate Institute of International and Development Studies; Paris-Sorbonne University

Michel Kafando (born 18 August 1942) is a Burkinabé diplomat and politician, who served as Interim President of Burkina Faso from 2014 to 2015. He previously served as Minister of Foreign Affairs from 1982 to 1983 and as Permanent Representative of Burkina Faso to the United Nations from 1998 to 2011.

Following the resignation of President Blaise Compaoré amidst the 2014 Burkinabé uprising, Kafando was chosen by the interim military administration until the next elections. Kafando was briefly ousted in the September 2015 coup attempt by the Regiment of Presidential Security, but he ultimately restored power within a week and disbanded the regiment. Elections took place shortly thereafter, and Kafando was succeeded by Roch Marc Christian Kaboré in December 2015.

== Background ==
Michel Kafando was born on 18 August 1942 in Ouagadougou. From 1956 until 1963 he attended Jean-Baptiste de la Salle College, where he received both his secondary education and his bachelor's degree in sciences. He attained a bachelor's degree in public law from the University of Bordeaux in 1969, a diploma in political studies in 1972 in Paris and another diploma from the Graduate Institute of International Studies in Geneva also in 1972. He later gained a PhD in political science at the Sorbonne in 1990. He is married to Marie Kafando and has one child.

== Diplomatic career ==
Michel Kafando was the Minister of Foreign Affairs of Upper Volta (as Burkina Faso was then known) from 1982 to 1983, becoming the only cabinet member to retain his portfolio after the November 1982 coup of Major Jean-Baptiste Ouédraogo. He was also a Vice-President of the United Nations General Assembly in 1982. He headed many delegations to the Organisation of African Unity (OAU) and was Vice-President of the African Centre for Environmental Protection (an NGO).

He served as Upper Volta's Permanent Representative to the UN and as its Ambassador to Cuba before being appointed as Permanent Representative to the UN for a second time; he presented his credentials to the Secretary-General of the United Nations, Kofi Annan, on 15 April 1998.

Kafando was President of the United Nations Security Council in September 2008 and in December 2009.

On 5 May 2017, Michel Kafando was appointed Special Envoy of the United Nations Secretary-General. As Special Envoy he will be involved in promoting peace in Burundi and political dialogue in the East African Community.

== Transitional President (2014-2015) ==
Long-time President Blaise Compaore was forced to resign on 31 October 2014 due to unrest related to his moves to eliminate term limits so that he could run for President again. Initially, the military under Lieutenant Colonel Isaac Zida took power, but it faced international pressure to hand over power to civilian authorities. On 17 November 2014, Kafando was appointed transitional President of Burkina Faso by the designation council. He was sworn in on 18 November 2014, and he appointed Zida as Prime Minister on 19 November. In the transitional government, appointed on 23 November, Kafando held the foreign affairs portfolio.

On 19 July 2015, amidst tensions between the military and Prime Minister Zida, Kafando stripped Zida of the defense portfolio and took over the portfolio himself. He also took over the security portfolio, previously held by Zida's ally Auguste Denise Barry. As part of the same reshuffle, he appointed Moussa Nébié to replace himself as Minister of Foreign Affairs.

On 16 September 2015, two days after a recommendation from the National Reconciliation and Reforms Commission to disband the Regiment of Presidential Security (RSP), members of the RSP detained President Kafando and Prime Minister Zida. The military chief of staff, Brigadier General Pingrenoma Zagré, called on members of the RSP to lay down their arms, promising in a statement that they would not be harmed if they surrendered peacefully.

Kafando was believed to remain under house arrest until 21 September, when he was reported to have arrived at the residence of the French ambassador. The regular army issued an ultimatum to the RSP to surrender by the morning of 22 September. Kafando was reinstalled as President at a ceremony on 23 September in the presence of ECOWAS leaders.

== Post-presidential career ==
In early May 2017 Kafando was appointed UN Envoy to Burundi.

Political offices
Preceded by Yacouba Isaac Zida as Transitional Head of State	President of Burkina Faso; Transitional; 2014–2015	Succeeded by Roch Marc Christian Kaboré
