= Presidential Security Regiment =

- Régiment de sécurité présidentielle
- Insignia of the RSP
- Active: 1995–2015
- Country: Burkina Faso
- Allegiance: President of Burkina Faso
- Branch: Burkina Faso Armed Forces
- Type: Praetorian Guard; Special operations force
- Role: Special operations Counter-terrorism; Special reconnaissance
- Size: ≈1,300

Commanders
- Notable commanders: Gilbert Diendéré; Yacouba Isaac Zida; Paul-Henri Sandaogo Damiba

The Presidential Security Regiment (French: Régiment de la sécurité présidentielle, RSP) was an elite praetorian guard unit responsible for the security and protection of the President of Burkina Faso. It was an independent branch and separate from the Burkina Faso Army.

The elite unit was well known for its frequent involvement in the politics of Burkina Faso, acting as the iron fist of former President Blaise Compaoré during his 27-year rule over the country. They were said to be widely feared by many people in the country, which in 2012 – two years prior to the overthrow of Compaoré's government – was described by the Democracy Index as an "authoritarian regime".

Following the 2014 Burkina Faso uprising, on 1 November 2014, Lieutenant Colonel Yacouba Isaac Zida – deputy commander of the RSP – briefly took over as Acting President following Compaoré's ouster. Later in the month, Zida was named Prime Minister. On 16 September 2015, after its disbandment was recommended, the RSP staged another coup that took Michel Kafando and his government hostage. The Army stepped in, and Kafando was reinstated on 23 September. The Presidential Security Regiment was disbanded, as previously recommended, on 25 September 2015.

== History ==
=== Support of Compaoré ===
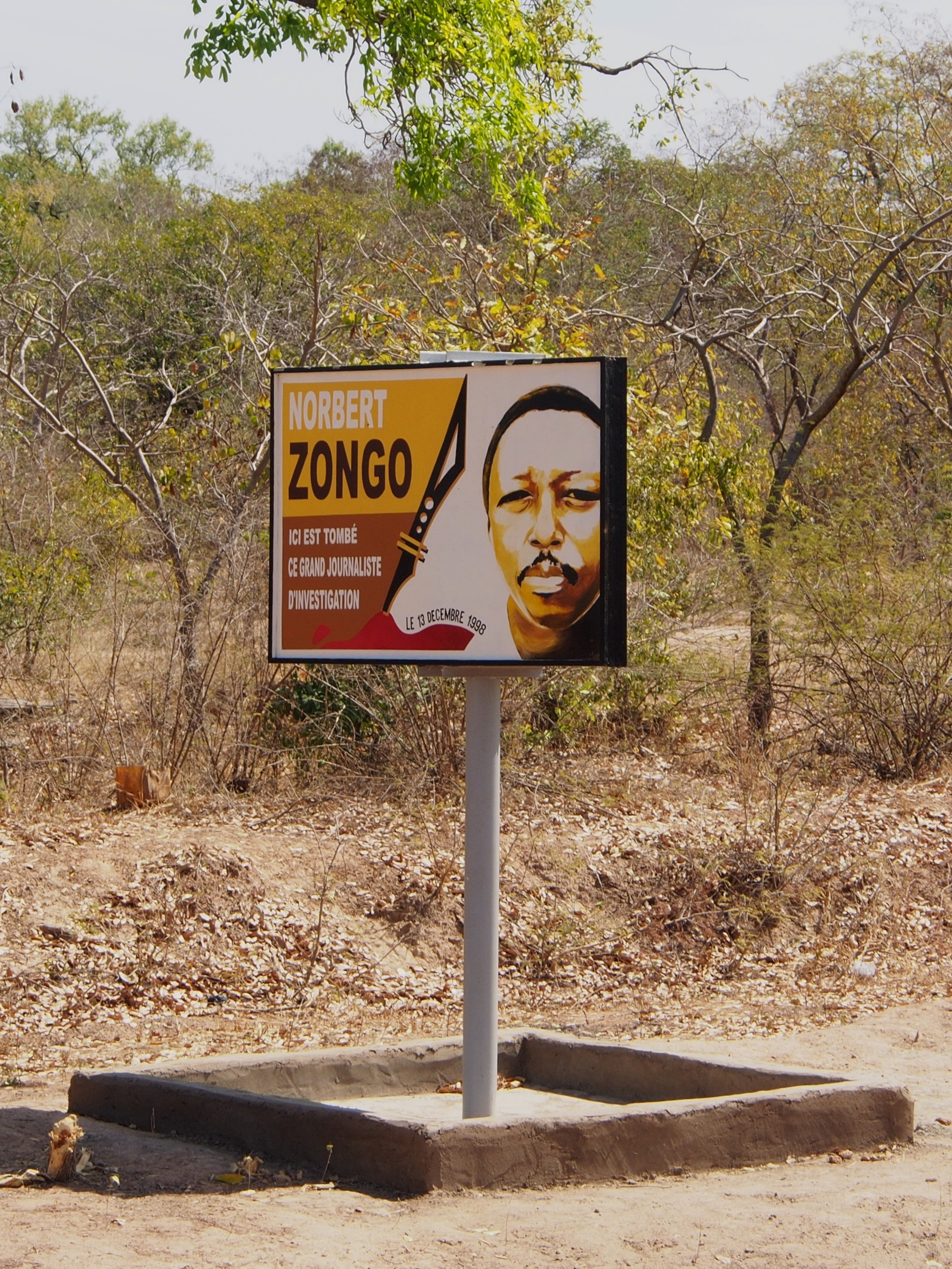
Norbert Zongo, a journalist killed by the RSP

Rising to prominence after Captain Blaise Compaoré seized power in a bloody 1987 military coup, it was involved in several extrajudicial killings on the orders of President Compaoré during the 1990s, functioning as a death squad as well as bodyguards. In 1990, the medical student and youth activist Dabo Boukary was tortured to death by the RSP. In 1998, David Ouedraogo – the driver of the President's brother François Compaoré – was murdered, which triggered an investigation by the journalist Norbert Zongo, the most prominent government critic in the country at the time. On 13 December 1998 the burnt bodies of Zongo, his brother Ernest, Ablassé Nikiema and Blaise Ilboudo were found in Sapouy, riddled with bullets. Initially dismissing the murders as a "tragic accident", the government was eventually forced by public pressure to appoint an investigation.

The Independent Commission of Inquiry found that Ouedraogo had been tortured to death by soldiers of the RSP in their barracks because of accusations that he had stolen from the President's brother, and that Norbert Zongo and the other three had been likewise killed by the RSP. Compaoré subsequently promised a reorganization of the RSP, and several of its soldiers were arrested, among them Marcel Kafando, who was the unit's commander at the time of the murders. By 2006, however, all had been acquitted or had their charges dropped.

Not only functioning as Compaoré's enforcers, members of the RSP were accused at least twice of involvement in attempts to seize power. In October 1996 twenty-five RSP soldiers were arrested, and together with the Regiment's commander – Hyacinthe Kafando (no relation to Marcel Kafando, his successor), who was abroad at the time – they were put on trial for plotting to launch a coup d'état, possibly with Ivorian involvement. Kafando, who had been involved in Compaoré's own 1987 military coup (which likewise had help from the Ivorian government at the time), was allowed to return to Burkina Faso from his exile in 2001. In October 2003 the government announced that it had successfully prevented a planned coup. In early January 2004 fifteen members of the armed forces, including several members of the RSP, were arrested together with two civilians on suspicion of involvement in an alleged conspiracy. After President Compaoré resigned on 31 October 2014 as a result of protests against his proposal to abolish presidential term limits, the RSP staged a coup on 16 September 2015 after its disbandment was recommended, seizing control of Ouagadougou. However, after popular opposition and action by the regular military, transitional President Michel Kafando and Prime Minister Yacouba Zida were restored to their positions on 23 September 2015.

The Regiment of Presidential Security had a prominent role in quelling the 2011 Burkinabé protests, which erupted in February and continued until a settlement was reached in June. In addition to large-scale street protests and labour strikes, the uprising involved numerous cases of mutinies among the armed forces. The RSP was instrumental in putting down these mutinies, for example laying siege to a military base in Bobo-Dioulasso in June and battling with rebellious troops there. These events caused friction between the Army and the Regiment, one feared by Compaoré and the other trusted. As a result of their role in the protests, the RSP received far better weaponry than the rest of the military, in addition to being better paid.

On 11 April 2012, a soldier who had deserted from the Regiment, Romuald Tuina, robbed a Ouagadougou bank in broad daylight, carrying off more than seven million CFA francs and fleeing to Ivory Coast. On the night of 30–31 August 2013, Tuina – having returned to Burkina Faso – attempted to assassinate Compaoré, opening fire on the President's office after breaking into the presidential palace dressed in a military uniform. He was killed in the following exchange of gunfire.

=== 2014 Burkinabé uprising ===
After 27 years of rule, President Blaise Compaoré attempted to remove the constitutional limit on presidential terms, allowing him to run again in the 2015 election. This triggered the 2014 Burkinabé uprising in late October, which saw tens of thousands of protesters march against the regime. The Regiment of Presidential Security initially joined the fray on the President's side, firing live rounds and tear gas when protesters marched on the presidential palace, and killing at least three protesters who tried to storm the home of the President's brother, Francis Compaoré.

On 31 October, President Blaise Compaoré resigned from the presidency and fled the country. In the wake of this, General Honoré Traoré, the army chief, claimed to have established a transitional military government with himself as president. Traoré was however rejected by many protesters as a close ally of Compaoré, and within a short time Lieutenant Colonel Yacouba Isaac Zida also claimed the position. Zida, the second in command of the Regiment of Presidential Security, called for a peaceful transition, stating that he would "assume the duties of head of this transition and head of state to guarantee the continuity of the state." Zida's claim was subsequently recognized by the Army, the leaders of which announced that Zida had been "chosen unanimously to lead the transition period".

While some opposition groups, like Le Balai Citoyen, immediately supported Zida, protests against the military takeover ensued soon afterwards. Over the following days Zida met with various political leaders and societal figures, attempting to negotiate a solution to the crisis and create a national unity government. Various international organizations soon began issuing demands for a handover of power to civilian forces.

=== 2015 Burkinabé coup d'état ===
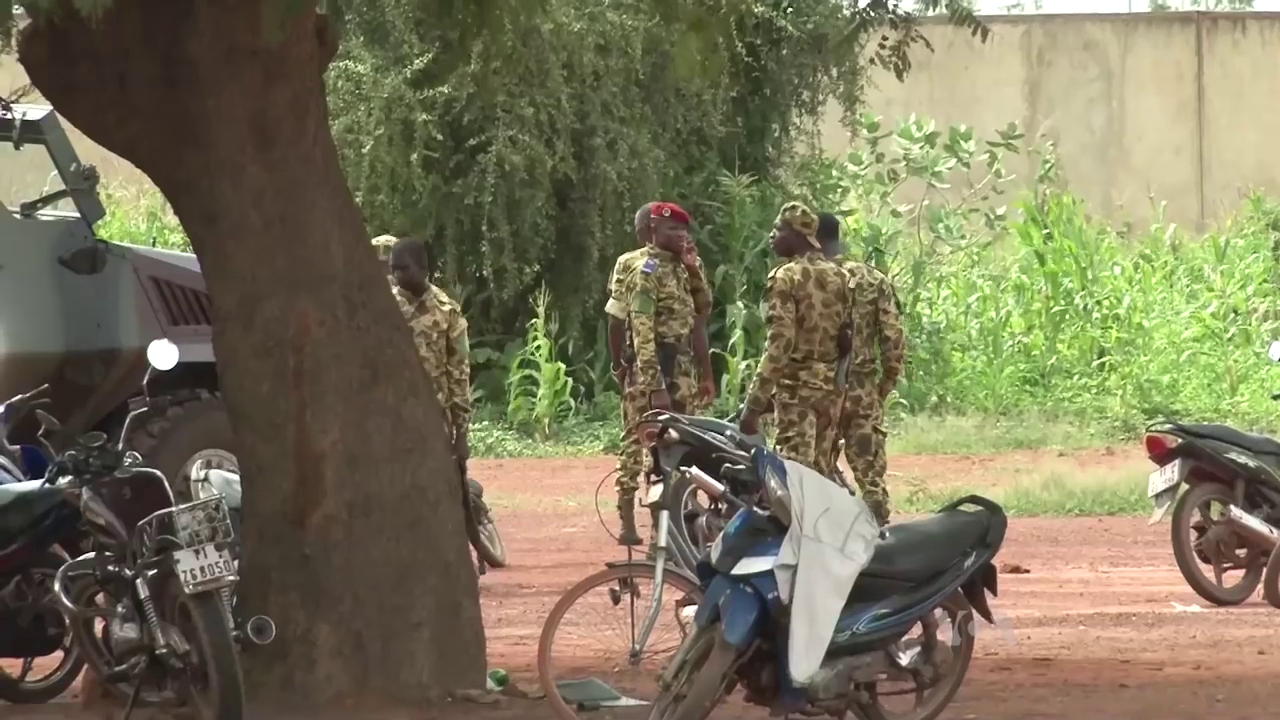
RSP soldiers in Ouagadougou during the 2015 coup d'état.

On 16 September 2015, two days after a reforms committee recommended disbanding the RSP, members of the RSP launched a coup d'état, arresting President Michel Kafando, Prime Minister Yacouba Zida and other members of the transitional government.

The new military junta failed to consolidate its authority across the country and faced protests from regional leaders, and eventually from the regular army, to restore the transitional government. After the army entered Ouagadougou to confront the RSP, Kafando was reinstalled as president on 23 September and Zida also returned to his post as prime minister. Gilbert Diendéré said that the coup was a mistake and that "we knew the people were not in favour of it. That is why we have given up."

==== Aftermath ====
Eleven people died, and more than 250 were injured during the coup. In the first cabinet meeting after the coup, the Security Minister was dismissed and the position of head of the president's military council was abolished. A commission was created to identify those involved in the coup and given thirty days to report. Prosecutions are expected to be made.

=== Disbandment ===
In September 2015, the RSP was disbanded, as recommended shortly before the 2015 coup.

== See also ==
- 2014 Burkinabé uprising
- 2015 Burkinabé coup d'état
- 2016 Burkinabé coup d'état attempt
