= Le Balai Citoyen =

Political movement

Le Balai Citoyen ('The Citizen's Broom' or 'The Civic Broom'), is a political grassroots movement in Burkina Faso, which was part of the opposition against President Blaise Compaoré. It was co-founded by two musicians, reggae artist Sams’K Le Jah and rapper Serge Bambara ('Smockey') in the Summer of 2013. They organized several protests in early 2014, for example hosting a joint rally with the newly formed Movement of People for Progress, filling a 35,000-capacity sports stadium to its rafters.

When the October 2014 Burkinabé uprising broke out the group became a prominent part of the protests, its activists gaining note due to their presence on the streets. President Compaoré was forced to resign and flee the country on 31 October, after 27 years of rule. The presidency was subsequently occupied by the military, which named the pro-protest officer Yacouba Isaac Zida as the country's interim leader. Le Balai Citoyen, which launched a symbolic sweeping of Ouagadougou's streets following Compaoré's departure, has been reported to be supportive of Zida's transitional rule. However, its leaders called for protesters to 'remain vigilant and on high alert, to not let anyone steal the victory of the sovereign people'.

The movement is part of the Burkinabé Sankarist political tradition, appealing to the legacy and ideals of Captain Thomas Sankara, a radical left-wing revolutionary who ruled the country from 1983 until his death in 1987, killed during a coup orchestrated by his successor Compaoré. Co-founder Sams’K Le Jah received his political education in the Pioneers of the Revolution, the youth movement of Sankara's 'Democratic and Popular Revolution'.

The movement is named both in reference to "sweeping out" perceived political corruption, and to the regular street-cleaning exercises – initiated by Thomas Sankara – in which citizens would pick up brooms and clean their neighbourhoods, both an act of community development and a metaphor for societal self-sufficiency. Members carry brooms during protests as a symbol of this.

== Spread of the Movement ==
Le Balai Citoyen was spread throughout Burkina Faso mostly by Burkinabé youth, as young people (<25 years of age) constitute 65% of Burkina Faso's population. Smockey and SamsK Le Jah were influenced by movements like Y'en a Marre in Senegal and the Black Power movement in the United States. However, the movement as a whole would bring together people of various militant backgrounds, such as syndicalists, Marxists and other leftist activists, who shared a distrust towards the traditional political party as an organisational form.

Initially the two artists spread their political messages to the youth through music broadcast on the radio. They continued to do so at politically involved concerts with many attendees. Thus, the popularity of Smockey and SamsK Le Jah played an important role in expanding the reaches of their message. Le Balai Citoyen quickly gained public recognition and was endorsed by influential public figures such as Burkinabé lawyer Guy Hervé Kam. This was accompanied by a rise in young figures speaking out against the current political regime. Thomas Sankara was used as a motivational symbol to bring people together for this movement.

The two musicians worked hard to further advance the movement by hosting conferences and meeting with influential figures, rural community members, and students from across the country. Inspired by Sankara's Committees for the Defense of the Revolution, the movement set up so-called "Cibal Clubs" as grassroots cells across the country, and even "Cibal Embassies" outside of Burkina Faso. ("Cibal" is a contraction of "Citoyen" and "Balai".) People were encouraged to participate in the movement through these local sections and to learn its purpose.

== Marches and Civic Engagement ==
Le Balai Citoyen focuses on all aspects of justice and civil rights through community involvement. Directly after its inception in 2013, members participated in several outreach programs and calls to action. On 12 August 2013, the movement put on a commemoration ceremony to honor Thomas Sankara and Norbert Zongo.

Between May and June 2014, Le Balai Citoyen held several sit-ins in both Ouagadougou and Bobo-Dioulasso, the second largest city in the country. One of the sit-ins occurred at hospital in Bobo-Dioulasso (l'Hopital Sanou Souro) urging officials to renovate the establishment. Another took place in front of Ouagadougou and Bobo-Dioulasso's electricity provider SONABEL for better electricity services. One more took place in front of Bobo-Dioulasso's town hall.

In October 2014, Blaise Compaoré put forth an amendment to the constitution known as Article 37 and called for a referendum. This amendment would grant him an extension to his presidency. L'inserrection Populaire (English: The Popular Insurrection) manifested between 27 and 31 October as the public's response to the referendum. In this period Le Balai Citoyen collaborated with Collectif des Femmes pour la Défense de la Constitution (English: Women's Collective for the Defense of the Constitution), Le Collectif anti-referendum (English: The Anti-referendum Collective), and more to protest in the streets. Individuals from all groups carried brooms and spatulas as they marched, to symbolize the sweeping out of the regime.

Le Balai Citoyen has also participated in many community service ventures. In 2014 they organized a public service cleaning day for a maternity ward in Ouagadougou (Maternité Pogbi) and arranged a blood drive in both Ouagadougou and Bobo-Dioulasso. They also opened up an international fundraising campaign for Yalgado, the largest public hospital in Ouagadougou. In more recent years, the movement has been focused on expressing solidarity with other African nations experiencing political turmoil.

=== Slogans ===
'Our Number is Our Strength!', 'Together we are never alone!'

== See also ==
- 2014 Burkinabé uprising
- Committees for the Defense of the Revolution
- Politics of Burkina Faso
