= 2011 Burkina Faso protests =

2011 protest movement in Burkina Faso

- Part of the impact of the Arab Spring
- Date: 22 February 2011 – 9 June 2011 (3 months, 2 weeks and 4 days)
- Location: Burkina Faso
- Caused by: Police brutality; High food prices; Low wages; Economic repression; Autocracy
- Goals: Democratic reforms; Higher wages for troops and public servants; Economic freedom
- Methods: Civil resistance; Demonstrations; Protest marches; Rioting; Vandalism
- Result: Some political concessions, with Compaoré continuing in office.; Governors replaced, wages for public servants raised.

Parties
(Burkina Faso) Protester	Government of Burkina Faso; National Police; Burkina Faso Armed Forces; Presidential Security Regiment; National Gendarmerie

Casualties
- Deaths: 21+

The 2011 Burkina Faso protests were a series of popular protests in Burkina Faso.

== Background ==
On 15 February, members of the military mutinied in the capital Ouagadougou over unpaid housing allowances; President Blaise Compaoré briefly fled the capital and sought safety in his hometown of Ziniaré. By Sunday 17 April, the mutiny had spread to the town of Pô in southern Burkina Faso; there were also protests over a court's decision to sentence several officers to prison sentences.

== Protests ==
The mutiny followed popular protests over rising prices in several cities across Burkina Faso, and protests starting 22 February over the death of a student in police custody in February, as well as the shooting of several other protesters. Five student protesters were reportedly killed in February. France24 suggested that Burkina Faso could be caught up in a full-scale uprising similar to that seen in several North African and Middle Eastern countries, proposing the rise of a "Burkinabè Spring".

On 22 April, a coalition of 34 Burkinabè opposition parties called for a rally on 30 April to demand President Compaoré's resignation.

By 27 April, farmers were protesting in Bobo-Dioulasso over low prices and merchants rioted in Koudougou over the closure of 40 shops due to unpaid rent. The house of Koudougou's mayor and its police station were burned. Later, that same evening, riot police joined the widespread mutiny in Ouagadougou.

Four young demonstrators protesting the police mutiny on 28 April were injured when police fired live ammunition to disperse protesters after they torched a police station in Ouagadougou.

On 29 April, President Blaise Compaoré announced he had negotiated with the army and they had agreed to put a stop to the mutinies and protests ravaging the country.

Some 3,000 protesters attended the opposition rally on 30 April in Ouagadougou, which lasted for hours despite the hot weather. Several local pop music stars joined the protest, performing and calling on Compaoré to step down. Several protesters carried signs comparing Compaoré to ousted Tunisian strongman Zine el-Abidine Ben Ali, who was toppled in a January revolution. Bénéwendé Stanislas Sankara, an opposition leader, said the rally was to demonstrate the desire of the Burkinabè people for reforms so that wealth from Burkina Faso's natural resources is distributed more evenly, not just benefiting those who are already rich and powerful.

Health Minister Adama Traoré said on 30 April that six people had died so far as a result of the mutinies, including an 11-year-old reportedly shot and killed while at school.

On 1 May, an affiliation of trade unions and civil servants in Ouagadougou canceled a planned march to commemorate May Day and protest the government due to concerns about bolstered security and the risk of agents provocateurs infiltrating the demonstration.

On 15 May, soldiers fired their guns in the air through the night, apparently to protest the tardiness of reforms and benefits promised to the army rank-and-file.

Three people were reportedly killed and 136 were injured during major daylong protests by students and soldiers in Ouagadougou on 24 May. Students also protested in Gaoua and Bobo-Dioulasso in support of a teachers' strike, torching ruling party offices in Gaoua.

The teachers' union and the government reached an agreement on 25 May, the day after the violent demonstrations, to raise wages in exchange for an end to the strike.

Soldiers mutinied again on 27 May in Tenkodogo and 1 June in Bobo-Dioulasso, among other cities and barracks particularly in eastern and northern Burkina Faso, firing into the air for hours on end in both daytime and nighttime hours. Shooting reportedly quieted in the north by 27 May after continuing throughout the weekend, but it had again spread to other parts of the country by that time.

On 3 June 2011, at least seven people were killed as pro-government forces quelled the protests and mutiny in Bobo-Dioulasso, including a 14-year-old girl. An army spokesman said 109 were detained in the government's strongest effort yet to end the mutiny. Traders upset by mutineers' extensive looting in Bobo-Dioulasso called for the government to offer swift recompense for their losses.

The government said it replaced all 13 regional governors as of 9 June, appointing three army officers among others to replace them in a bid to ease tensions.

== Aftermath ==
With the protests quieted, Reforms Minister Bongnessan Arsene Ye said on 23 June that the government established a 68-member committee to consider changes to the constitution. However, opposition leader Benewende Stanislas Sankara, a key figure in the protest movement, said the opposition had declined to be represented in the committee over concerns that the changes to the constitution would allow President Blaise Compaoré to further extend his term of office rather than creating a more democratic process in Burkina Faso.

In October 2014, protesters rose again to protest President Compaoré's attempt to change the Constitution of Burkina Faso so he could remain in power for another term. They stormed the National Assembly of Burkina Faso, Compaoré's presidential palace, and the state broadcaster's headquarters, among other locations.
