= Yacouba Isaac Zida =

Burkinabé military officer. (born 1965)

Isaac Zida
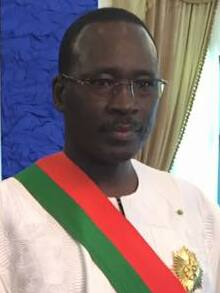
- Zida in 2015

Head of State of Burkina Faso
- De facto
- In office 1 November 2014 – 18 November 2014
- Preceded by: Honoré Traoré (as interim head of state)
- Succeeded by: Michel Kafando (as interim President)

Prime Minister of Burkina Faso
- Interim
- In office 18 November 2014 – 17 September 2015
- President: Michel Kafando (Interim)
- Preceded by: Luc-Adolphe Tiao
- Succeeded by: Vacant
- In office 23 September 2015 – 28 December 2015
- President: Michel Kafando (Interim)
- Preceded by: Vacant
- Succeeded by: Paul Kaba Thieba

Personal details
- Born: 16 November 1965 (age 60) Upper Volta (now Burkina Faso)
- Party: Independent

Military service
- Allegiance: Burkina Faso
- Branch/service: Army of Burkina Faso
- Years of service: Until 2017
- Rank: Divisional General
- Unit: Regiment of Presidential Security (until 2015)
- *Kafando was briefly deposed from 17 September 2015 – 23 September 2015 by Gilbert Diendéré.

Yacouba Isaac Zida (born 16 November 1965) is a Burkinabé military officer and politician, who served as the Interim Head of State of Burkina Faso in November 2014.

Zida took power on an interim basis in the aftermath of the 2014 Burkinabé uprising, sidelining a more senior officer, Honoré Nabéré Traoré. A few weeks later, power was handed over to a civilian Head of State, Michel Kafando, with the intention of leading the country until the next election. Zida was subsequently appointed Interim Prime Minister by Kafando. Zida was briefly ousted from power in the 2015 coup attempt by the Presidential Security Regiment before power was restored and the regiment was disbanded.

== Early career ==
Zida obtained a master's degree in International Management from the University of Lyon. He also received military training from the American army. Under President Blaise Compaoré, he served as deputy commander of the Regiment of Presidential Security. He was a UN peacekeeper in Democratic Republic of the Congo from 2008 to 2009.

== 2014 Burkinabé uprising ==
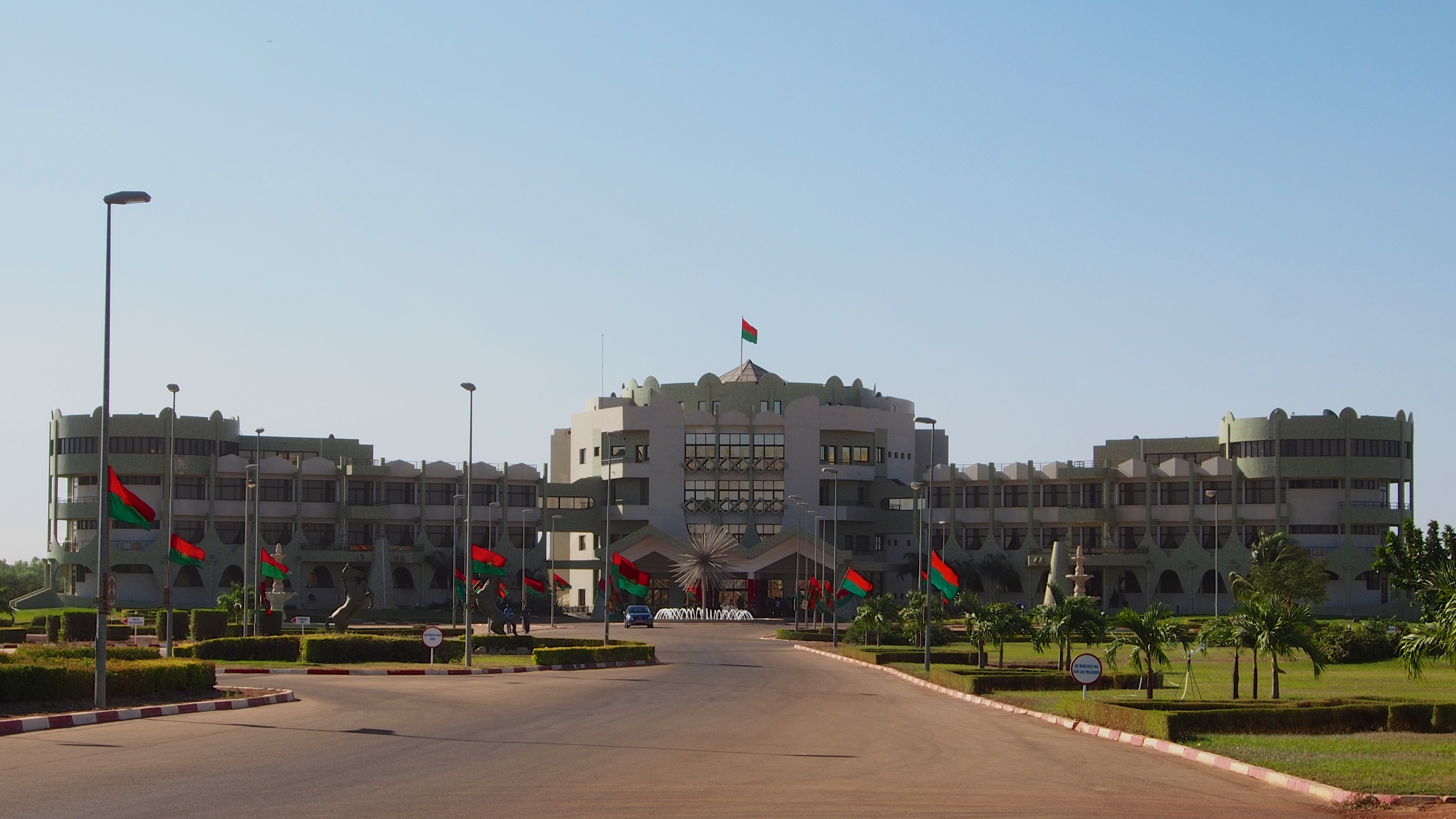
Kossyam palace, where Zida aligned himself with the protesters

During the 2014 Burkinabé uprising, President Compaoré resigned on 31 October 2014 and army chief Honoré Nabéré Traoré announced that he was taking over as head of state, but his claim to power was immediately contested by a group of junior officers headed by Zida, who aligned himself with the protesters. On 1 November 2014, the armed forces unanimously backed Zida to lead the country in an interim capacity towards the 2015 presidential election.

On 17 November 2014, a civilian, Michel Kafando, was chosen to replace Zida as transitional head of state, on 18 November he was sworn in and appointed Zida as Prime Minister of Burkina Faso. In the transitional government, appointed on 23 November, Zida held the defense portfolio in addition to his role as prime minister.

In mid-2015 there was a dispute between Zida and the Regiment of Presidential Security. In early July, he refuted media reports that he had resigned, and criticized the press for careless reporting. Nevertheless, he faced opposition from the military as well as Compaoré supporters, leaving him in a precarious position, although he maintained the support of Sankarists led by Bénéwendé Sankara. On 19 July 2015, President Kafando stripped Zida of the defense portfolio and took over the portfolio himself. He also dismissed Auguste Denise Barry, who was closely associated with Zida, from his key post as Minister of Territorial Administration and Security.

On 16 September 2015, two days after a recommendation from the National Reconciliation and Reforms Commission to disband the Regiment of Presidential Security (RSP), members of the RSP detained President Kafando and Prime Minister Zida. On 23 September, after the coup failed, Zida was reinstated as prime minister.

In November 2015, near the end of the transitional period, Zida was promoted from the rank of lieutenant-colonel to général de division in line with a law passed during the transition that provided for promotions to be granted "for services rendered to the nation". Roch Marc Christian Kaboré, who was elected as President, was sworn in on 29 December 2015 and subsequently appointed Paul Kaba Thieba, an economist, as prime minister.

The law providing for Zida's promotion was scrapped by the newly elected National Assembly. With permission from President Kaboré, Zida traveled to Canada in January 2016 to visit his family. He was due to return in February, but he failed to do so despite orders from Kaboré. In December 2016, Kaboré said that Zida would be expelled from the army for desertion.

== Notes ==
Political offices
Preceded by Blaise Compaoré as President	President of Burkina Faso; Transitional; 2014	Succeeded by Michel Kafando as Transitional President
Preceded by Luc-Adolphe Tiao	Prime Minister of Burkina Faso; 2014–2015	Succeeded by Paul Kaba Thieba
