= Roch Marc Christian Kaboré =

President of Burkina Faso from 2015 to 2022

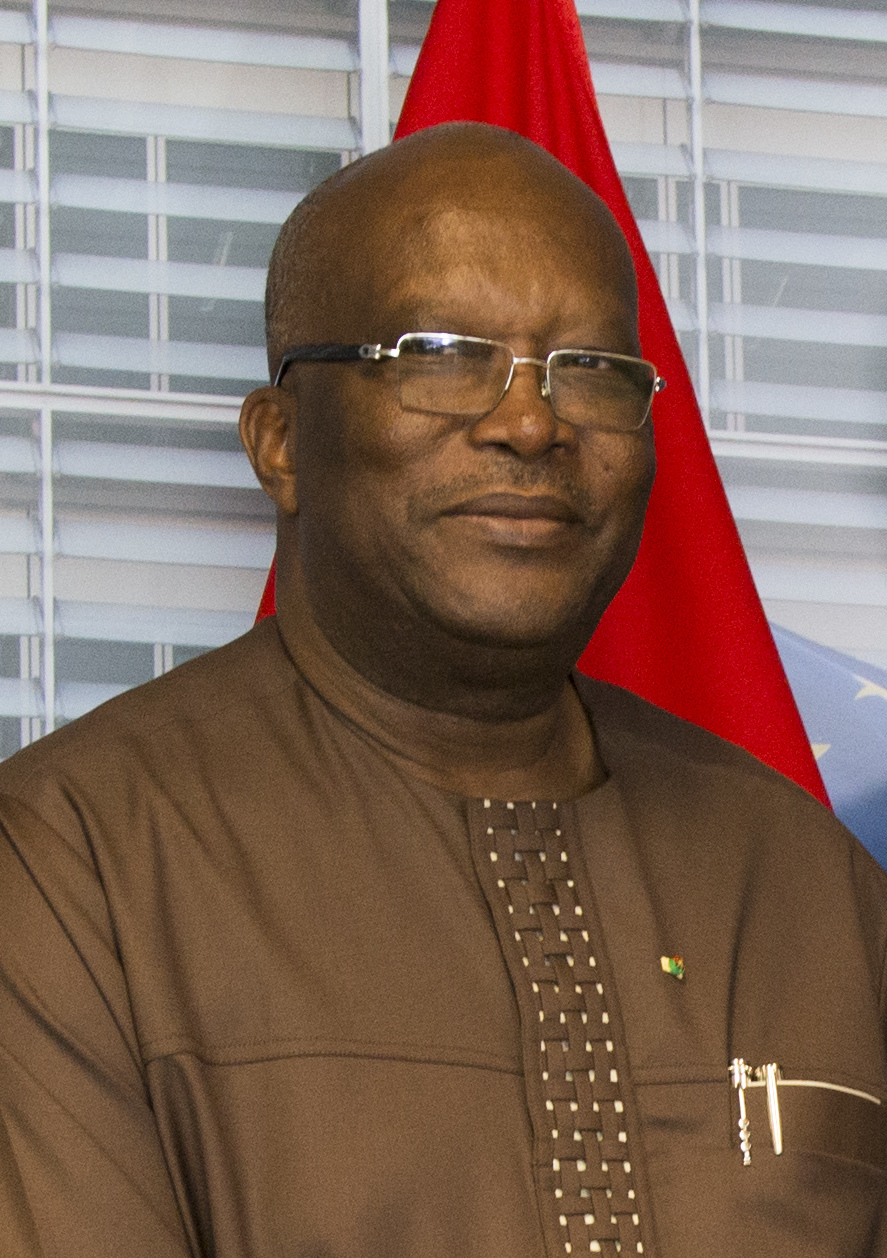
- Kaboré in 2018

3rd President of Burkina Faso
- In office 29 December 2015 – 24 January 2022
- Prime Minister: Paul Kaba Thieba; Christophe Joseph Marie Dabiré; Lassina Zerbo
- Preceded by: Michel Kafando (transitional)
- Succeeded by: Paul-Henri Sandaogo Damiba (interim)

President of the National Assembly
- In office 6 June 2002 – 28 December 2012
- Preceded by: Mélégué Maurice Traoré
- Succeeded by: Soungalo Ouattara

Prime Minister of Burkina Faso
- In office 22 March 1994 – 6 February 1996
- President: Blaise Compaoré
- Preceded by: Youssouf Ouédraogo
- Succeeded by: Kadré Désiré Ouedraogo

Personal details
- Born: 25 April 1957 (age 69) Ouagadougou, French Upper Volta (now Burkina Faso)
- Party: People's Movement for Progress (2014–2026)
- Other political affiliations: Organization for Popular Democracy – Labour Movement (before 1996); Congress for Democracy and Progress (1996–2014)
- Spouse: Sika Bella Kaboré (m. 1982)
- Children: 3
- Education: University of Burgundy
- Website: Official Website

Roch Marc Christian Kaboré (French pronunciation: [ʁɔk maʁk kʁistjɑ̃ kabɔʁe]; born 25 April 1957) is a Burkinabé banker and politician who served as the President of Burkina Faso from 2015 until he was deposed in 2022. He was the Prime Minister of Burkina Faso between 1994 and 1996 and President of the National Assembly of Burkina Faso from 2002 to 2012. Kaboré was also president of the Congress for Democracy and Progress (CDP) until his departure from the party in 2014. He founded the People's Movement for Progress party that same year.

Kaboré was elected president in the November 2015 general election, winning a majority in the first round of voting. Upon taking office, he became the first non-interim president in 49 years without any past ties to the military. Kaboré worked as a banker prior to his political career.

On 24 January 2022, Kaboré was deposed and detained by the military in a coup d'état. After the announcement, the military declared that the parliament, government and constitution had been dissolved.

== Early years ==
Kaboré was born in Ouagadougou, the capital city of Burkina Faso, then called Upper Volta. He is the son of Charles Bila Kaboré, former government minister and former Deputy Governor of the Central Bank of West African States (BCEAO). He attended primary school from 1962 to 1968, when he received his CPS (Certificate of Primary School). On completing this basic education certificate, he attended the Collège Saint Jean-Baptiste de la Salle, a selective school in Ouagadougou. He studied there from 1968 to 1975, passing his BEPC or General Certificate ('O' Level) in 1972 and his baccalauréat ('A' level) in 1975. He went on to study economics at the University of Dijon, majoring in business administration. There, he completed his BA in 1979 and his Master's in 1980.

Kaboré met his future wife, Sika Bella Kaboré, while both were studying in France. The couple married in 1982 and have three children.

== Career ==
=== Banking career ===
Kaboré, like his father, Charles Bila Kaboré (who was a government minister under President Maurice Yaméogo), worked as a banker for the International Bank of Burkina (BIB). He was eventually promoted to head Burkina Faso's largest bank during the presidency of Thomas Sankara. In 1984, aged 27, he was named the General Director of the BIB; he remained in that post until September 1989, when he was appointed to the government.

=== Political career ===
He was in the government as a minister and a special adviser to the president and has been a deputy in the National Assembly. He became Prime Minister in 1994. When the Congress for Democracy and Progress was formed in early February 1996, Kaboré resigned as Prime Minister and became the new ruling party's First Vice-President, as well as Special Adviser at the Presidency.

On 6 June 2002, he was elected as President of the National Assembly of Burkina Faso, succeeding Mélégué Maurice Traoré.

Function	Period
Minister of Transports and Communications	21 September 1989
Minister of State	16 February 1992
Member of the Parliament Representing the Kadiogo Region for the ODP/MT (now the CDP Party)	24 May 1992
Minister of State for Finance and Plan	From 19 June 1992 to 3 September 1993
Minister of State	From 3 September 1993 to 20 March 1994
Prime Minister	20 March 1994
Special Advisor of the President of Burkina Faso	From February 1996 to June 1997
Elected as a member of the National Assembly for the CDP Party	11 May 1997
Elected as the National Secretary of the CDP Party	August 1999
Elected as President of the National Assembly	6 June 2002
Elected President of the CDP Party	August 2003
Elected President of Burkina Faso	November 2015

In the May 2007 parliamentary election, Kaboré was re-elected to the National Assembly as the first candidate on the CDP's national list. Following the election, the National Assembly again elected Kaboré as its president. He received 90 votes, while Norbert Tiendrébéogo received 13; there were seven invalid votes.

=== Resignation from the CDP ===
Kaboré, along with a number of other prominent figures in the CDP, announced his resignation from the party on 6 January 2014. Those who resigned said that the party was being run in an undemocratic and damaging manner, and they expressed opposition to plans to amend the constitution to eliminate term limits, which would allow President Blaise Compaoré to stand for re-election in 2015. On 25 January 2014, a new opposition party led by Kaboré, the People's Movement for Progress (Mouvement du Peuple pour le Progrès, MPP), was founded.

=== Presidency ===
At an MPP convention held at the Ouagadougou Palais des Sports on 4–5 July 2015, Kaboré was officially confirmed as the MPP candidate for the presidential elections due to be held on 29 November 2015.

In the election of 29 November 2015, Kaboré won the election in the first round of voting, receiving 53.5% of the vote against 29.7% for the second place candidate, Zephirin Diabré. He was sworn in as President on 29 December 2015. He appointed Paul Kaba Thieba, an economist, as Prime Minister on 7 January 2016. The composition of the new government was announced on 13 January, with Kaboré personally taking charge of the ministerial portfolio for defense and veteran affairs. Jean-Claude Bouda, who had been Minister of Youth, was appointed on 20 February 2017 to take over from Kaboré as Minister of Defense.

He was reelected to a second term in the 22 November 2020 general elections with 57.74% of the vote.

==== Deposition and arrest ====
On 24 January 2022, Kaboré was deposed by the military. After the announcement, the military declared that the parliament, government, and constitution had been dissolved. The Patriotic Movement for Safeguard and Restoration (MPSR) shared his signed, hand-written resignation letter, which stated: "In the interests of the nation, following events that took place since yesterday, I have decided to resign from my role as president of Burkina Faso." It was afterwards reported that Kaboré had been detained at a military barracks. By February 2022, he was transferred to house arrest.

ECOWAS pressured the military regime to release Kaboré, and in April 2022, he was released from house arrest.

Political offices
Preceded by Youssouf Ouédraogo	Prime Minister of Burkina Faso; 1994–1996	Succeeded by Kadré Désiré Ouedraogo
Preceded by Michel Kafando; Transitional	President of Burkina Faso; 2015–2022	Succeeded by Paul-Henri Sandaogo Damiba; Interim
Party political offices
New political party	Leader of the People's Movement for Progress; 2014–present	Incumbent
