= List of diplomatic missions of Burkina Faso =

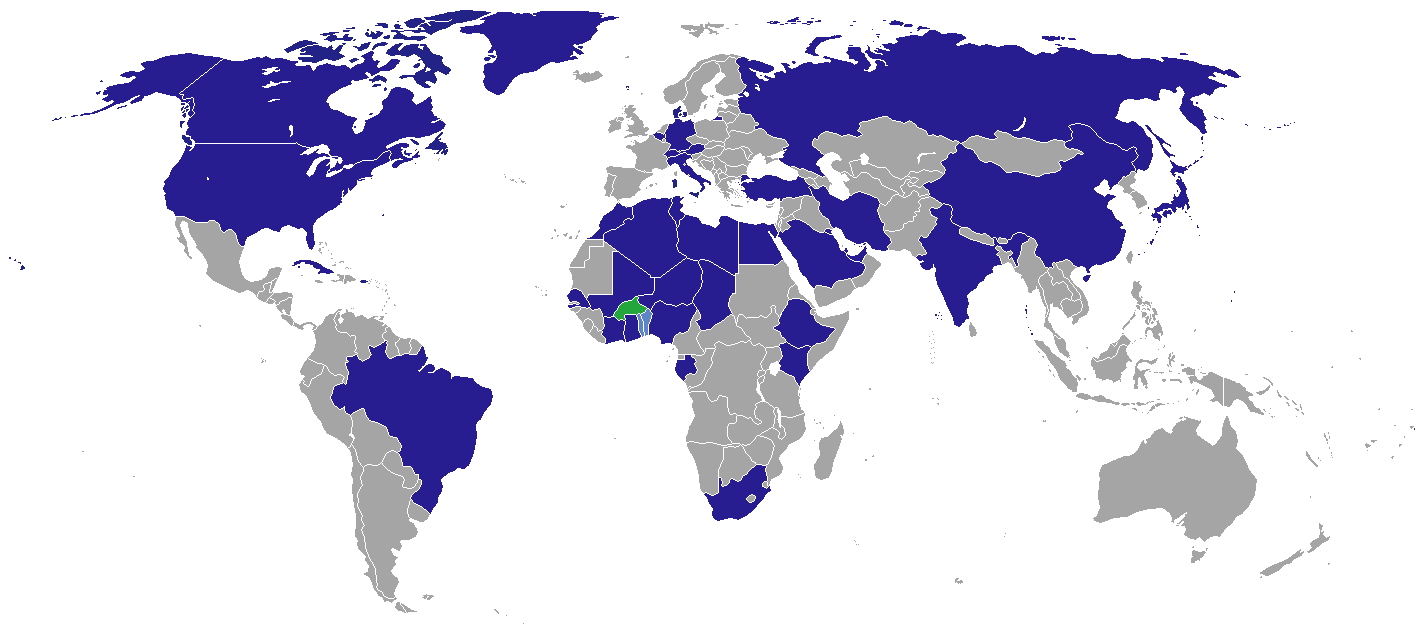
Location of diplomatic missions of Burkina Faso

This is a list of diplomatic missions of Burkina Faso, excluding honorary consulates.

== Current missions ==
=== Africa ===
Host country	Host city	Mission	Concurrent accreditation	Ref.
Algeria	Algiers	Embassy		
Benin	Cotonou	Consulate-General (Note: Subordinate to the embassy in Accra)		
Chad	N'Djamena	Embassy		
Egypt	Cairo	Embassy		
Equatorial Guinea	Malabo	Consulate-General		
Ethiopia	Addis Ababa	Embassy	International Organizations: African Union	
Gabon	Libreville	Embassy		
Ghana	Accra	Embassy	Countries: Benin; Togo	
Ghana	Kumasi	Consulate-General	Countries: Benin; Togo	
Ivory Coast	Abidjan	Embassy	Countries: Liberia; Sierra Leone	
Ivory Coast	Bouaké	Consulate-General	Countries: Liberia; Sierra Leone	
Ivory Coast	Soubré	Consulate-General	Countries: Liberia; Sierra Leone	
Kenya	Nairobi	Embassy	Countries: Burundi; Rwanda	
Libya	Tripoli	Embassy	Countries: Malta	
Mali	Bamako	Embassy		
Mali	Ségou	Consulate-General		
Morocco	Rabat	Embassy		
Niger	Niamey	Embassy		
Nigeria	Abuja	Embassy	Countries: Cameroon; Equatorial Guinea; São Tomé and Príncipe; International Organizations: Economic Community of West African States	
Nigeria	Lagos	Consulate-General	Countries: Cameroon; Equatorial Guinea; São Tomé and Príncipe; International Organizations: Economic Community of West African States	
Senegal	Dakar	Embassy	Countries: Cape Verde; Gambia; Guinea; Guinea-Bissau; Mauritania	
South Africa	Pretoria	Embassy	Countries: Angola; Botswana; Comoros; Eswatini; Lesotho; Madagascar; Malawi; Mauritius; Mozambique; Namibia; Seychelles; Zambia; Zimbabwe	
Togo	Lomé	Consulate-General		
Tunisia	Tunis	Embassy		

=== America ===
Host country	Host city	Mission	Concurrent accreditation	Ref.
Brazil	Brasília	Embassy	Countries: Chile; Ecuador; Peru; Uruguay; Venezuela	
Canada	Ottawa	Embassy		
Cuba	Havana	Embassy	Countries: Costa Rica; Guatemala; Panama	
United States	Washington, D.C.	Embassy	Countries: Mexico	
United States	New York City	Consulate-General	Countries: Mexico	

=== Asia ===
Host country	Host city	Mission	Concurrent accreditation	Ref.
China	Beijing	Embassy	Countries: Vietnam	
India	New Delhi	Embassy	Countries: Indonesia; Thailand	
Iran	Tehran	Embassy		
Japan	Tokyo	Embassy	Countries: Philippines; Singapore	
Kuwait	Kuwait City	Embassy		
Qatar	Doha	Embassy		
Saudi Arabia	Riyadh	Embassy	Countries: Bahrain; Brunei	
Saudi Arabia	Jeddah	Consulate-General	Countries: Bahrain; Brunei	
Turkey	Ankara	Embassy	Countries: Georgia	
United Arab Emirates	Abu Dhabi	Embassy		

=== Europe ===
Host country	Host city	Mission	Concurrent accreditation	Ref.
Austria	Vienna	Embassy	Countries: Croatia; Czechia; Hungary; Slovakia; Slovenia; International Organizations: United Nations	
Belgium	Brussels	Embassy	Countries: Ireland; Luxembourg; Netherlands; United Kingdom; International Organizations: European Union; Organisation of African, Caribbean and Pacific States; Organisation for the Prohibition of Chemical Weapons; World Customs Organization	
Denmark	Copenhagen	Embassy	Countries: Finland; Iceland; Norway; Sweden	
Germany	Berlin	Embassy	Countries: Estonia; Latvia; Lithuania; Poland	
Holy See (Note: The Burkinabé Embassy to the Holy See is located outside Vatican territory in Rome)	Rome	Embassy	Sovereign entity: Sovereign Military Order of Malta	
Italy	Rome	Embassy	Countries: Albania; Bosnia and Herzegovina; Bulgaria; Cyprus; Greece; Romania	
Italy	Milan	Consulate-General	Countries: Albania; Bosnia and Herzegovina; Bulgaria; Cyprus; Greece; Romania	
Russia	Moscow	Embassy	Countries: Armenia; Belarus; Kazakhstan; Kyrgyzstan; Mongolia; Tajikistan; Turkmenistan; Ukraine; Uzbekistan	

=== Multilateral organisations ===
Organization	Host city	Host country	Mission	Concurrent accreditation	Ref.
United Nations	Geneva	Switzerland	Permanent Mission	Countries: Liechtenstein; Switzerland; International Organizations: Conference on Disarmament; International Labour Organization; International Organization for Migration; International Telecommunication Union; United Nations Conference on Trade and Development; United Nations Industrial Development Organization; World Food Programme; World Health Organization; World Intellectual Property Organization; World Trade Organization	
United Nations	New York City	United States	Permanent Mission		

== Gallery ==
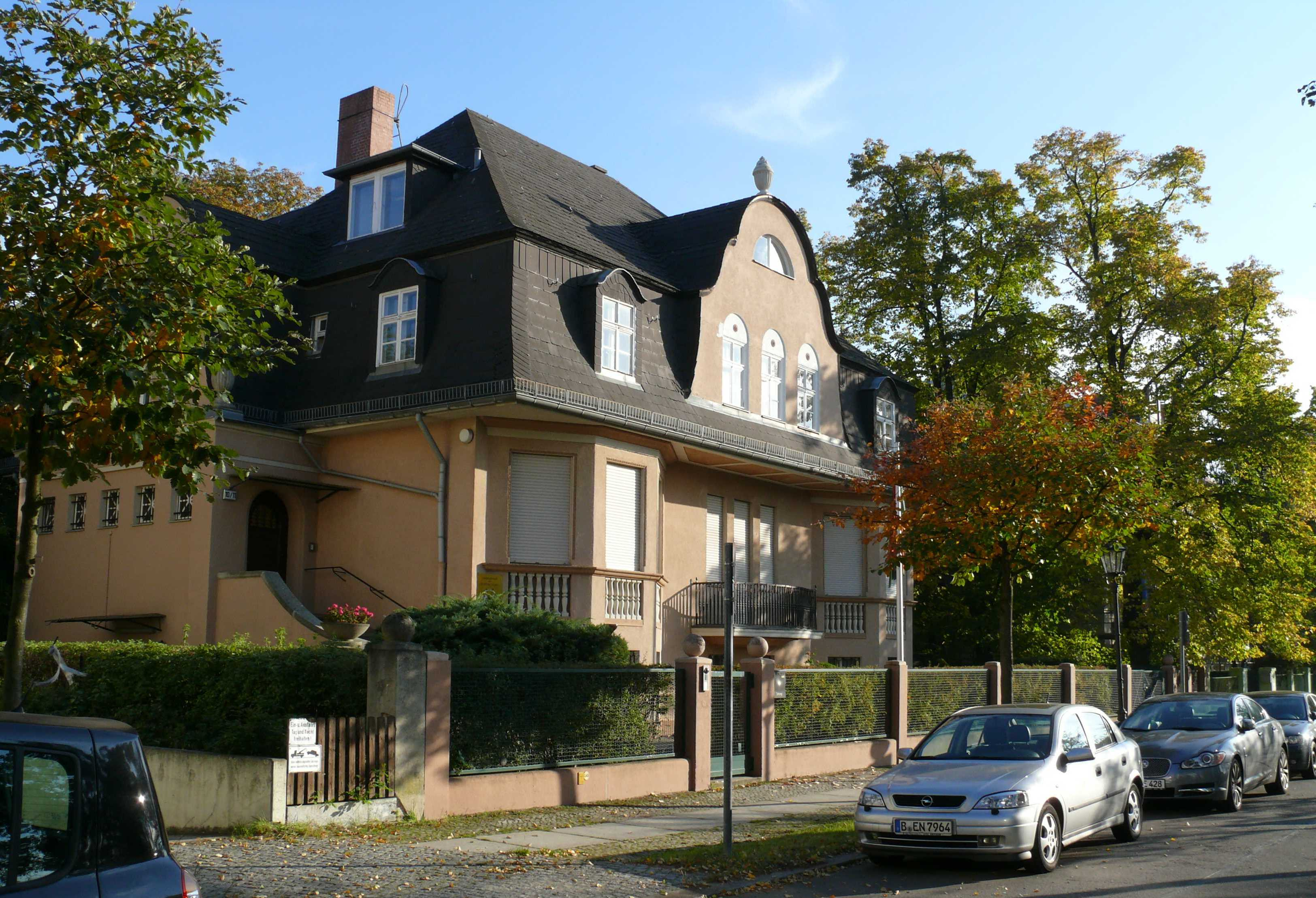
Embassy in Berlin

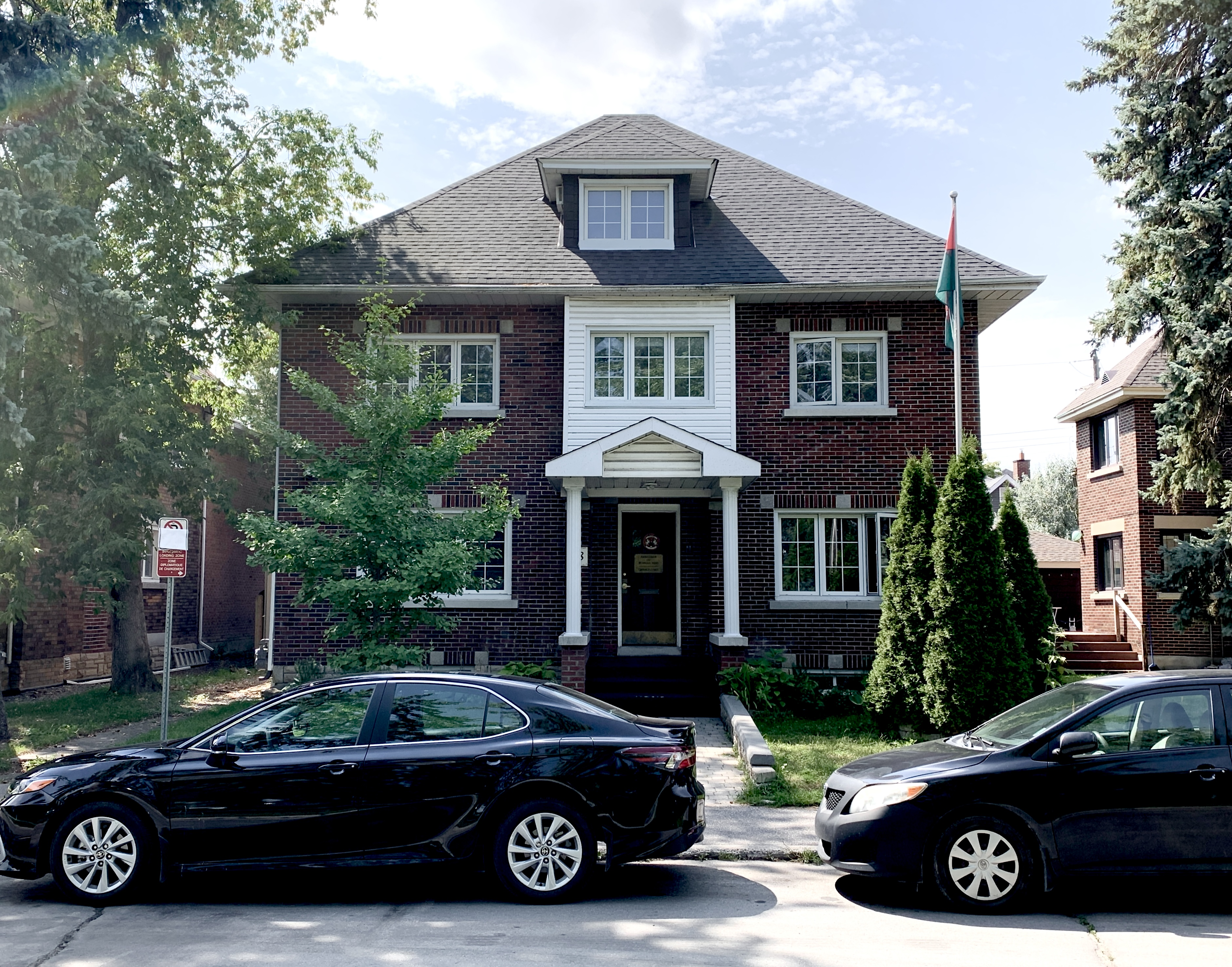
Embassy in Ottawa

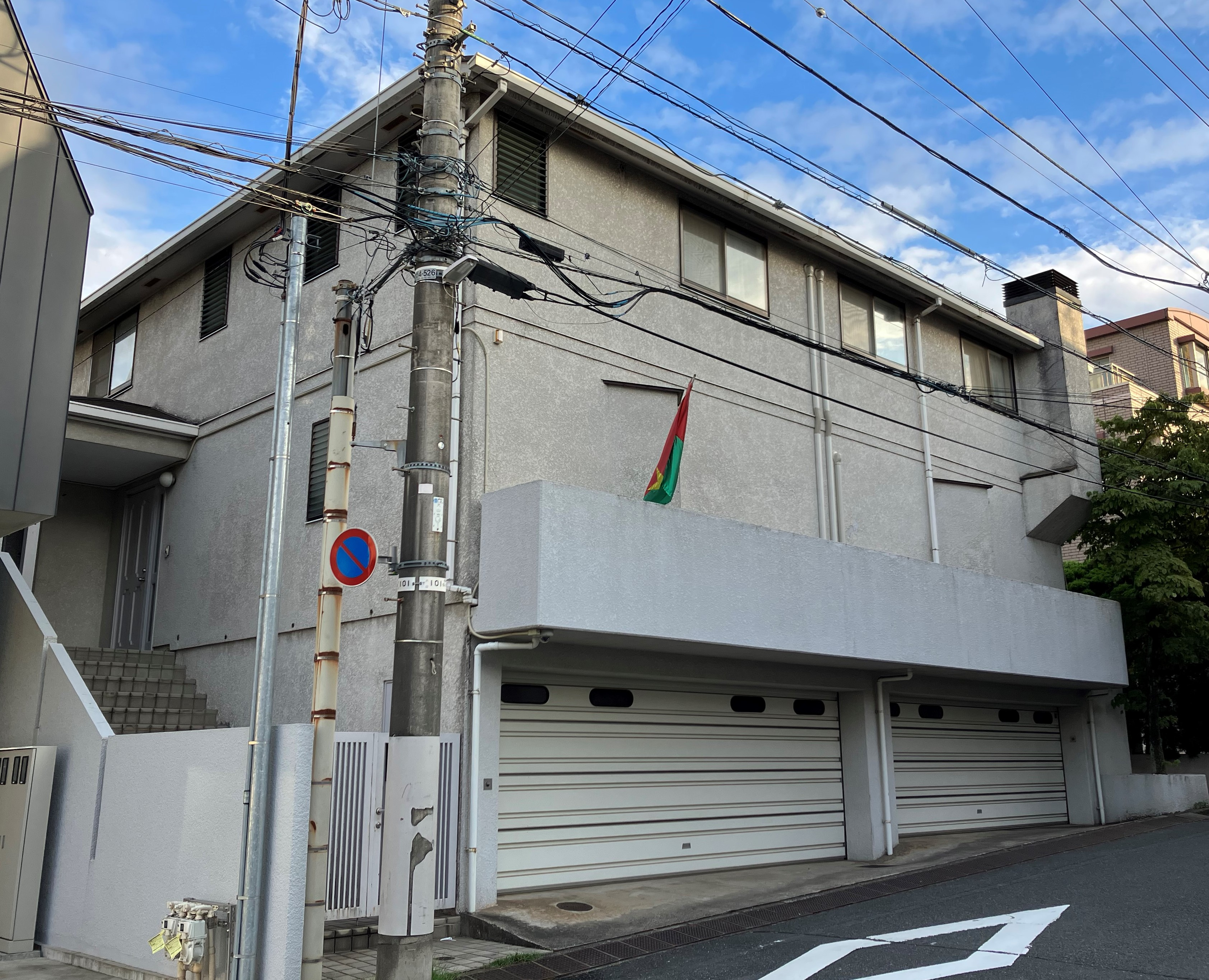
Embassy in Tokyo

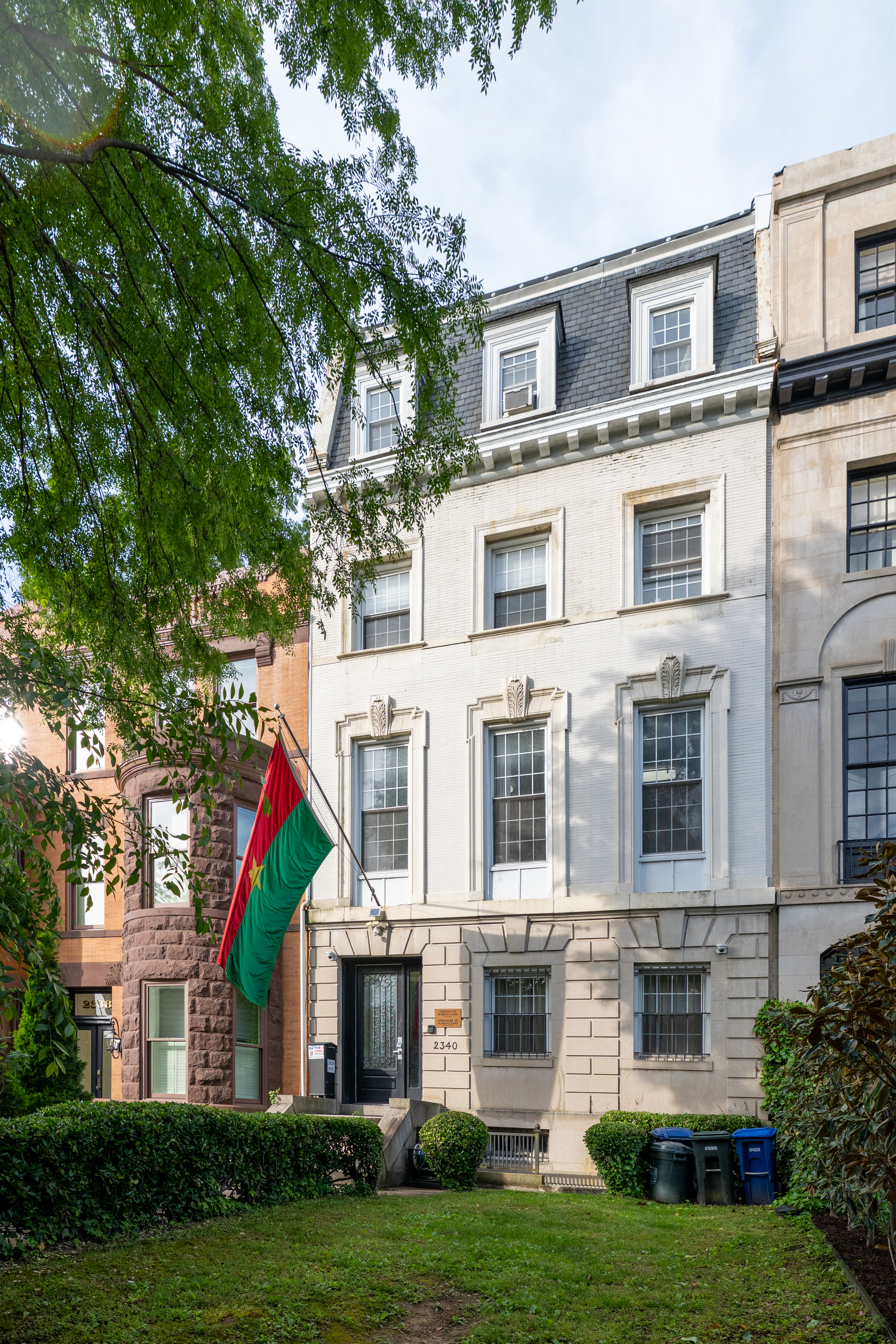
Embassy in Washington, D.C.

== Closed missions ==
=== Africa ===
Host country	Host city	Mission	Year closed	Ref.
Liberia	Monrovia	Embassy	Unknown	

=== Asia ===
Host country	Host city	Mission	Year closed	Ref.
Republic of China (Taiwan)	Taipei	Embassy	2018	
Israel	Jerusalem	Embassy	Unknown	
Lebanon	Beirut	Embassy	1966	

=== Europe ===
Host country	Host city	Mission	Year closed	Ref.
France	Paris	Embassy	26 June 2026	
United Kingdom	London	Embassy	1967	

== See also ==
- Foreign relations of Burkina Faso
- List of diplomatic missions in Burkina Faso
- Visa policy of Burkina Faso
- Visa requirements for Burkinabe citizens
