= Foreign relations of Burkina Faso =

Burkina Faso has good relations with the European Union, African and certain Asian countries.

According to the U.S. State Department, "U.S. relations with Burkina Faso are good but subject to strains in the past because of the Compaoré government's past involvement in arms trading and other sanctions-breaking activity." Burkina Faso cut diplomatic ties with Taiwan in May 2018 (being the most populous state to do so in the 21st century) and the foreign ministry of China stated it approved of its decision.

Burkina Faso's relations with its West African neighbors have improved in recent years. Relations with Ghana, in particular, have warmed. President Compaoré had mediated a political crisis in Togo and helped to resolve the Tuareg conflict in Niger. Burkina maintains cordial relations with Libya, but recalled its in ambassador in 2017 over issues of treatment of migrants trying to reach Europe, and the reemergence of the slave trade there. A territorial dispute with Mali was mediated by Ghana and Nigeria, which has led to lessening of tensions between the two nations.

Nineteen provinces of Burkina Faso are joined with contiguous areas of Mali and Niger under the Liptako–Gourma Authority, a regional economic organization. As of 7/6/24, Burkina Faso, Mali, and Niger have turned away from the West African bloc ECOWAS to pursue their own confederation of junta states, which they claim is to create a "community of sovereign peoples far from the control of foreign powers. A community of peace, solidarity, prosperity based on our African values."

Burkina Faso is also a member of the International Criminal Court with a bilateral immunity agreement of protection for the United States-military (as covered under Article 98).

== Diplomatic relations ==
List of countries which Burkina Faso maintains diplomatic relations with:

#	Country	Date
—	France (suspended)	4 August 1960
1	Germany	4 August 1960
2	United States	5 August 1960
3	United Kingdom	6 October 1960
4	Cameroon	1960
5	Mali	18 March 1961
6	Ghana	12 June 1961
7	Israel	5 July 1961
8	Egypt	23 September 1961
9	Belgium	17 October 1961
10	Switzerland	17 October 1961
11	Netherlands	14 December 1961
12	Liberia	1961
13	Sierra Leone	1961
14	India	23 March 1962
15	South Korea	20 April 1962
16	Canada	27 April 1962
17	Japan	1 June 1962
18	Italy	16 June 1962
19	Lebanon	1962
20	Luxembourg	29 January 1963
21	Guinea	1963
22	Spain	27 November 1964
23	Sudan	1964
24	Sweden	1964
25	Tunisia	1964
26	Morocco	21 October 1965
27	Gabon	11 November 1965
28	Peru	March 1966
29	Ivory Coast	30 December 1966
30	Algeria	10 January 1967
31	Russia	18 February 1967
32	Ethiopia	11 April 1968
33	Romania	13 April 1968
34	Bulgaria	29 May 1968
35	Czech Republic	3 June 1968
36	Hungary	8 June 1968
37	Poland	15 June 1968
38	Serbia	8 July 1968
39	Nigeria	19 February 1970
40	Turkey	6 April 1970
41	Austria	9 December 1970
42	Senegal	27 December 1971
43	Denmark	1971
44	Mauritania	3 October 1972
45	North Korea	11 October 1972
—	Holy See	14 June 1973
46	China	15 September 1973
47	Vietnam	16 November 1973
—	Sovereign Military Order of Malta	1973
48	Bangladesh	10 July 1974
49	Kuwait	17 August 1975
50	Jamaica	20 September 1975
51	Argentina	26 September 1975
52	Brazil	8 October 1975
53	Rwanda	26 November 1975
54	Cuba	11 December 1975
55	Uganda	26 May 1976
56	Mexico	30 June 1976
57	Albania	15 January 1977
58	United Arab Emirates	16 January 1978
59	Portugal	7 July 1978
60	Greece	1978
61	Finland	15 February 1980
62	Norway	3 March 1980
63	Saudi Arabia	25 March 1980
64	Libya	12 January 1981
65	Niger	30 June 1981
66	Guinea-Bissau	18 August 1981
67	Togo	18 August 1981
68	Oman	5 October 1981
69	Iraq	16 August 1982
70	Nicaragua	30 November 1983
71	Iran	1 November 1984
72	Thailand	12 July 1985
73	Mongolia	25 October 1985
74	Guyana	23 September 1987
75	Colombia	27 September 1988
76	Qatar	23 October 1988
77	Bahrain	25 February 1989
—	State of Palestine	1989
78	Yemen	25 January 1990
79	Brunei	21 January 1992
80	Ukraine	6 February 1992
81	Jordan	15 July 1992
82	Indonesia	8 August 1992
83	Chile	29 September 1992
84	Armenia	16 November 1992
85	Belarus	25 November 1992
86	Moldova	11 December 1992
87	Singapore	1 May 1993
88	Equatorial Guinea	1993
89	Honduras	30 September 1994
90	Malaysia	4 January 1995
91	Slovenia	28 March 1995
92	South Africa	11 May 1994
93	Croatia	18 May 1995
94	Bosnia and Herzegovina	26 May 1995
95	Slovakia	1 August 1997
96	Lithuania	23 September 1998
97	Cyprus	13 June 2001
98	Costa Rica	22 June 2001
99	Iceland	23 October 2001
100	Philippines	10 October 2002
101	Madagascar	14 October 2002
102	Angola	16 January 2003
103	Mauritius	14 March 2003
104	Kenya	25 March 2003
105	Venezuela	2 September 2003
106	Azerbaijan	28 May 2004
107	North Macedonia	27 November 2004
108	Andorra	18 May 2005
109	Chad	14 October 2005
110	Estonia	28 March 2006
111	Guatemala	21 July 2006
112	Gambia	20 October 2006
113	Botswana	12 January 2007
114	Haiti	25 January 2007
115	Saint Vincent and the Grenadines	20 February 2007
116	Ireland	1 May 2007
117	Laos	1 August 2007
118	Uruguay	28 August 2007
119	Dominican Republic	28 September 2007
120	Malta	8 February 2008
121	Pakistan	6 May 2008
122	Australia	13 November 2008
123	Paraguay	18 May 2010
124	Cambodia	2 July 2010
125	Kazakhstan	10 February 2011
126	Latvia	6 April 2011
127	Zambia	15 July 2011
128	Panama	29 July 2011
129	Montenegro	20 December 2011
130	Maldives	29 December 2011
131	Malawi	2011
132	Tajikistan	12 January 2012
133	Ecuador	8 February 2012
134	Georgia	2 October 2012
135	Sri Lanka	16 November 2012
—	Kosovo	6 December 2012
136	Tuvalu	15 February 2013
137	Fiji	22 November 2013
138	Djibouti	16 December 2013
139	Cape Verde	14 May 2014
140	Namibia	23 July 2014
141	Monaco	19 September 2014
142	Mozambique	16 September 2015
143	Turkmenistan	12 March 2016
144	Lesotho	14 April 2016
145	New Zealand	19 April 2017
146	Seychelles	16 May 2017
147	Nepal	29 December 2017
148	São Tomé and Príncipe	19 February 2019
149	Burundi	28 October 2019
150	Zimbabwe	30 October 2019
151	Tanzania	25 August 2021
152	Saint Kitts and Nevis	10 October 2021
153	Marshall Islands	26 September 2024
154	Kyrgyzstan	7 April 2025
155	Somalia	25 June 2026
156	Benin	Unknown

== Bilateral relations ==
Country	Formal Relations Began	Notes
Austria	1970	Austria is represented in Burkina Faso by its embassy in Dakar, Senegal; Diplomatic relations were established in 1960.
China	15 September 1973	See Burkina Faso–China relations Diplomatic relations were established on 15 September 1973.
Cyprus	13 June 2001	See Burkina Faso–Cyprus relations
Denmark	1971	See Burkina Faso–Denmark relations
France	4 August 1960; Severed relations in June 2026	See Burkina Faso–France relations Diplomatic relations were established on 4 August 1960. Present day Burkina Faso was formerly part of a French colony called French Upper Volta. France has special forces stationed in Burkina Faso.: Burkina Faso has an embassy in Paris.; France has an embassy in Ouagadougou.; In January 2023, Burkina Faso's military junta asked France to recall its ambassador amid a surge of anti-French sentiment as the country moved to develop closer ties to Russia
Gabon	11 November 1965	Diplomatic relations were established on 11 November 1965. On 29 December 1969 first Ambassador of Gabon to Upper Volta Mr. Marcel Sandoungout has presented his letters of credence.
Ghana	12 June 1961	See Burkina Faso–Ghana relations Diplomatic relations were established on 12 June 1961 With the coming to power of Thomas Sankara in Burkina Faso in 1983, relations between Ghana and Burkina became both warm and close. Indeed, Rawlings and Sankara began discussions about uniting Ghana and Burkina in the manner of the defunct Ghana-Guinea-Mali Union, which Nkrumah had sought unsuccessfully to promote as a foundation for his dream of unified continental government. Political and economic ties between Ghana and Burkina, a poorer country, were strengthened through joint commissions of cooperation and through border demarcation committee meetings. Frequent high-level consultations and joint military exercises, meant to discourage potential dissidents and to protect young "revolutions" in each country, were fairly regular features of Ghana-Burkina relations.
Iceland	23 October 2001	Burkina Faso is represented in Iceland by its embassy in Copenhagen, Denmark.
India	23 March 1962	See Burkina Faso–India relations Both countries established diplomatic relations on 23 March 1962
Iran	1 November 1984	Diplomatic relations were established on 1 November 1984 See Burkina Faso–Iran relations
Israel	5 July 1961	Both countries established diplomatic relations on 5 July 1961. Although Burkina Faso operates a consulate in Tel Aviv, Israel has no diplomatic nor consular presence in Burkina Faso. The Israeli ambassador to Côte d'Ivoire Dr. Eliyahu Ben-Tura is accredited as the non-resident Ambassador to Burkina Faso (as well as Benin and Togo).
Italy	16 June 1962	Diplomatic relations were established on 16 June 1962 when Mr. Renzo Luigi Romanelli, the first Italian Ambassador to Upper Volta, has presented his letters of credence to President Maurice Yameogo.: Burkina Faso has an embassy in Rome and honorary consulates in Florence, Milan, Naples, and Palermo.; Italy has an honorary consulate in Ouagadougou.
Ivory Coast	30 December 1966	Both countries established diplomatic relations on 30 December 1966 When Thomas Sankara came to power in 1983 relations between Burkina Faso and Ivory Coast became hostile as Félix Houphouët-Boigny was threatened by Sankara's revolutionary regime. That was one of the main reasons why Blaise Compaore launched his coup in 1987 killing Sankara and making himself president. Under Blaise Compaore Ivory Coast and Burkina Faso reestablished good relations and both countries supported Charles Taylor's NPFL in their overthrow of Samuel Doe. They remain allies and are active trading partners.
Kosovo	6 December 2012	Burkina Faso recognised the Republic of Kosovo on April 24, 2008. Burkina Faso and Kosovo established diplomatic relations on 6 December 2012.
Libya	12 January 1981	See Burkina Faso–Libya relations Both countries established diplomatic relations on 12 January 1981.
Mexico	30 June 1976	Diplomatic relations were established on 30 June 1976: Burkina Faso is accredited to Mexico from its embassy in Washington, D.C., United States and an honorary consulate in Mexico City.; Mexico is accredited to Burkina Faso from its embassy in Abuja, Nigeria.
Netherlands	14 December 1961	Diplomatic relations were established on 14 December 1961: Burkina Faso is represented in the Netherlands by its embassy in Brussels, Belgium and an honorary consulate in Rotterdam.; The Netherlands are represented in Burkina Faso by their embassy in Bamako, Mali.
Nigeria	19 February 1970	Diplomatic relations were established on 19 February 1970 when Ambassador of Upper Volta to Nigeria (resident in Accra) Mr. Victor Kabore, presented his credentials.
North Korea	11 October 1972	See Burkina Faso–North Korea relations Diplomatic relations were established on 11 October 1972
Portugal	7 July 1978	Diplomatic relations were established on 7 July 1978 when Ambassador of Upper Volta M. Victor Kabore, has presented his credentials to President of Portugal Ramalho Eanes.
Russia	18 February 1967	See Burkina Faso–Russia relations Diplomatic relations between Burkina Faso and the Soviet Union were established for the first time on February 18, 1967. After the breakup of the Soviet Union, Burkina Faso recognized Russia as the USSR's successor. However financial reasons has shut the embassies between the two nations. In 1992, the embassy of the Russian Federation in Ouagadougou was closed, and in 1996, the embassy of Burkina Faso in Moscow was closed. Burkina Faso has since re-opened its embassy in Moscow.
Saint Kitts and Nevis	10 October 2021	Diplomatic relations were established on 10 October 2021: Diplomatic relations were established and signed a visa agreement at the 60th Anniversary Additional Commemorative Non-Aligned Meeting.
South Africa	11 May 1994	Diplomatic relations were established on 11 May 1994; Both countries are full members of the African Union.
Spain	27 November 1964	See Burkina Faso–Spain relations Diplomatic relations were established on 27 November 1964
Sweden	1969	See Burkina Faso–Sweden relations Diplomatic relations were established in 1969 Sweden is a major contributor of developmental aid to Burkina Faso. The Burkina Faso–Sweden Friendship Association was formed in 1986 to promote exchange between the two countries.
Turkey	6 April 1970	See also Burkina Faso–Turkey relations Diplomatic relations were established on 6 April 1970: Burkina Faso has an embassy in Ankara.; Turkey has an embassy in Ouagadougou.; Trade volume between the two countries was US$52.2 million in 2019 (Burkina Faso's exports/imports: 20.8/31.4 million USD).
United Kingdom	6 October 1960	See Foreign relations of the United Kingdom Burkinabè President Blaise Compaoré with Deputy Prime Minister Nick Clegg in London, January 2011. Burkina Faso established diplomatic relations with the United Kingdom on 6 October 1960, then known as Upper Volta.: Burkina Faso does not maintain an embassy in the United Kingdom.; The United Kingdom is not accredited to Burkina Faso through an embassy; the UK develops relations through its high commission in Accra, Ghana.; Both countries share common membership of the International Criminal Court, the United Nations, and the World Trade Organization.
United States	5 August 1960	See Burkina Faso–United States relations Diplomatic relations were established on 5 August 1960 Relations are good but subject to strains in the past because of the Compaoré government's past involvement in arms trading and other sanctions-breaking activity. In addition to regional peace and stability, U.S. interests in Burkina are to promote continued democratization and greater respect for human rights and to encourage sustainable economic development. Although the Agency for International Development (USAID) closed its office in Ouagadougou in 1995, about $18 million annually of USAID funding goes to Burkina's development through non-governmental and regional organizations. The largest is a Food for Peace school lunch program administered by Catholic Relief Services. Burkina has been the site of several development success stories. U.S. leadership in building food security in the Sahel after the 1968–74 drought has been successful in virtually eliminating famine, despite recurrent drought years. River blindness has been eliminated from the region. In both cases, the U.S. was the main donor to inter-African organizations headquartered in Ouagadougou which through sustained efforts have achieved and consolidated these gains. In 2005, Burkina Faso and the Millennium Challenge Corporation (MCC) signed a $12 million Threshold Country Program to build schools and increase girls' enrollment rates. In November 2005, the Millennium Challenge Corporation selected Burkina Faso as eligible to submit a proposal for Millennium Challenge Account assistance for fiscal year 2006, making it one of only two countries eligible for threshold as well as compact funding. The Government of Burkina Faso is working closely with MCC staff to finalize its compact submission.

== See also ==
- List of diplomatic missions in Burkina Faso
- List of diplomatic missions of Burkina Faso
- List of current ambassadors of Burkina Faso

== External websites ==
- Official website – Ministry of Foreign Affairs of Burkina Faso (in French)
