= Burkina Faso–Sweden relations =

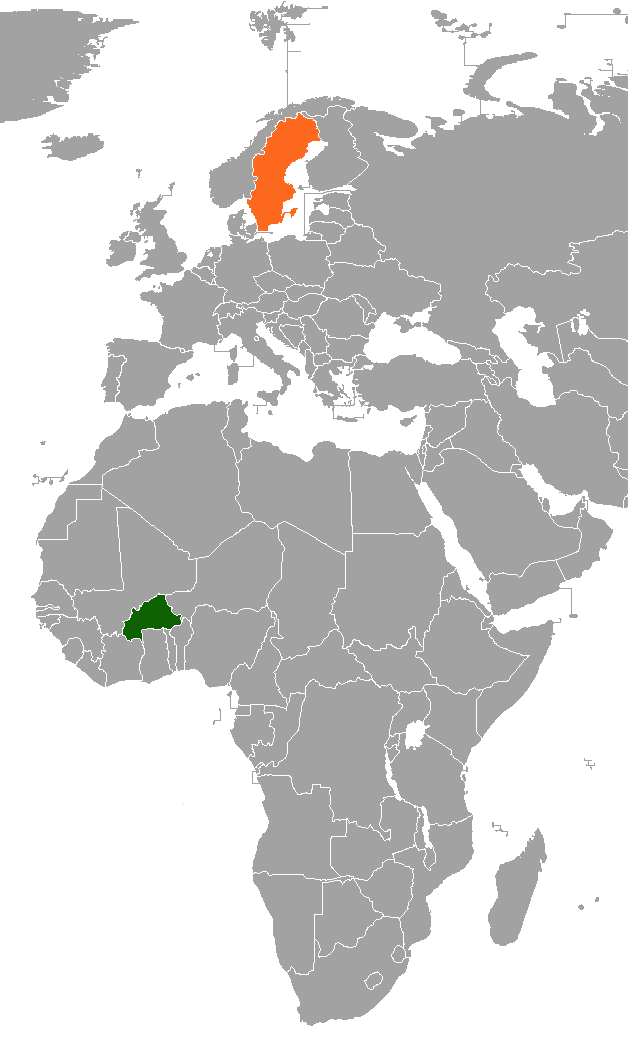
- Burkina Faso: Sweden

Burkina Faso–Sweden relations refers to the current and historical relationship between Sweden and Burkina Faso. Burkina Faso has a non-resident ambassador located in Copenhagen, Denmark and an honorary consulate in Uppsala. Sweden had an embassy in Ouagadougou, which was opened in 2010 and closed in 2024.

== History ==
The Swedish government recognized the Republic of Upper Volta as a sovereign and independent state in conjunction with its declaration of independence on 5 August 1960. Acting Foreign Minister Ragnar Edenman sent a congratulatory telegram to President and Head of Government Maurice Yaméogo, expressing hope for friendly and cordial relations between the two countries. Simultaneously, a congratulatory telegram was also sent by King Gustaf VI Adolf.

Sweden accredited its first ambassador to Burkina Faso, then known as the Republic of Upper Volta, in 1964. The ambassador was initially stationed in Abidjan, Ivory Coast.

The relations between Burkina Faso and Sweden have, due to the large distance between the two countries and the only minor bilateral trade, largely been defined by economic aid, in addition to some cultural and scientific exchange. A first Burkinabé student arrived in Sweden during the early 1970s, and have been followed by many more. Sweden participated in several exchange programmes with the country during the 1980s, with the first direct cooperation starting following a visit to the Sahel region by Foreign Minister Hans Blix. In 1986 – during the rule of Captain Thomas Sankara – the Burkina Faso–Sweden Friendship Association (ASSAMBUS) was formed.

Burkinabé–Swedish cooperation in the 21st century takes many forms. In the field of science, Swedish universities have educated dozens of Burkinabé doctoral students, and worked together with Burkinabé universities on research in fields such as agroforestry, cultural geography, and rural development. Culturally, several Burkinabé film festivals and art exhibitions have been held in Sweden. While the level of bilateral trade is low, some Swedish companies have established a presence in Burkina Faso, in industries such as mining, agriculture, and energy.

== Political relations ==
Several Swedish political parties have fraternal relations with Burkinabé opposition parties, and have established political cooperation, among the Centre Party (with the Alliance for Democracy and Federation – African Democratic Rally), the Christian Democrats (with the Union for the Republic) and the Left Party (with the African Independence Party, merged in 2012 to form the Party for Democracy and Socialism/Metba).

== Foreign aid ==
Sweden's government has been a major donor of aid to Burkina Faso in recent years, one of the six largest of all international contributors. A large-scale cooperation programme was launched in 2001. In 2012, the right-wing government of Prime Minister Fredrik Reinfeldt announced it would decrease aid to Burkina Faso, and cut the cooperation programme by 2016. This decision faced criticism, and was retracted in 2014 by a new centre-left government. Left Party foreign affairs spokesperson Hans Linde described this change in policy as an effect of political pressure from his party.

== Trade ==
All imports from Burkina Faso to Sweden are duty-free and quota-free, with the exception of armaments, as part of the Everything but Arms initiative of the European Union.

== See also ==
- Foreign relations of Burkina Faso
- Foreign relations of Sweden
