= Hans Linde =

Hans Linde may refer to:

- Hans A. Linde, former Judge of the Oregon Supreme Court in the United States
- Hans-Martin Linde, German musician and author
- Hans Linde (Swedish politician), Swedish politician member of the Riksdag
