= Burkina Faso–Taiwan relations =

- Burkina Faso: Taiwan

Burkina Faso–Taiwan relations refer to the historical relationship between the Republic of China (Taiwan) and Burkina Faso. Taiwan had an embassy in Ouagadougou, and Burkina Faso had an embassy in Taipei. In May 2018, Burkina Faso switched to recognize the People's Republic of China, thus ending diplomatic ties with Taiwan. The last ambassador of Burkina Faso to Taiwan, appointed in August 2017, was Aminata Sana Congo.

== History ==
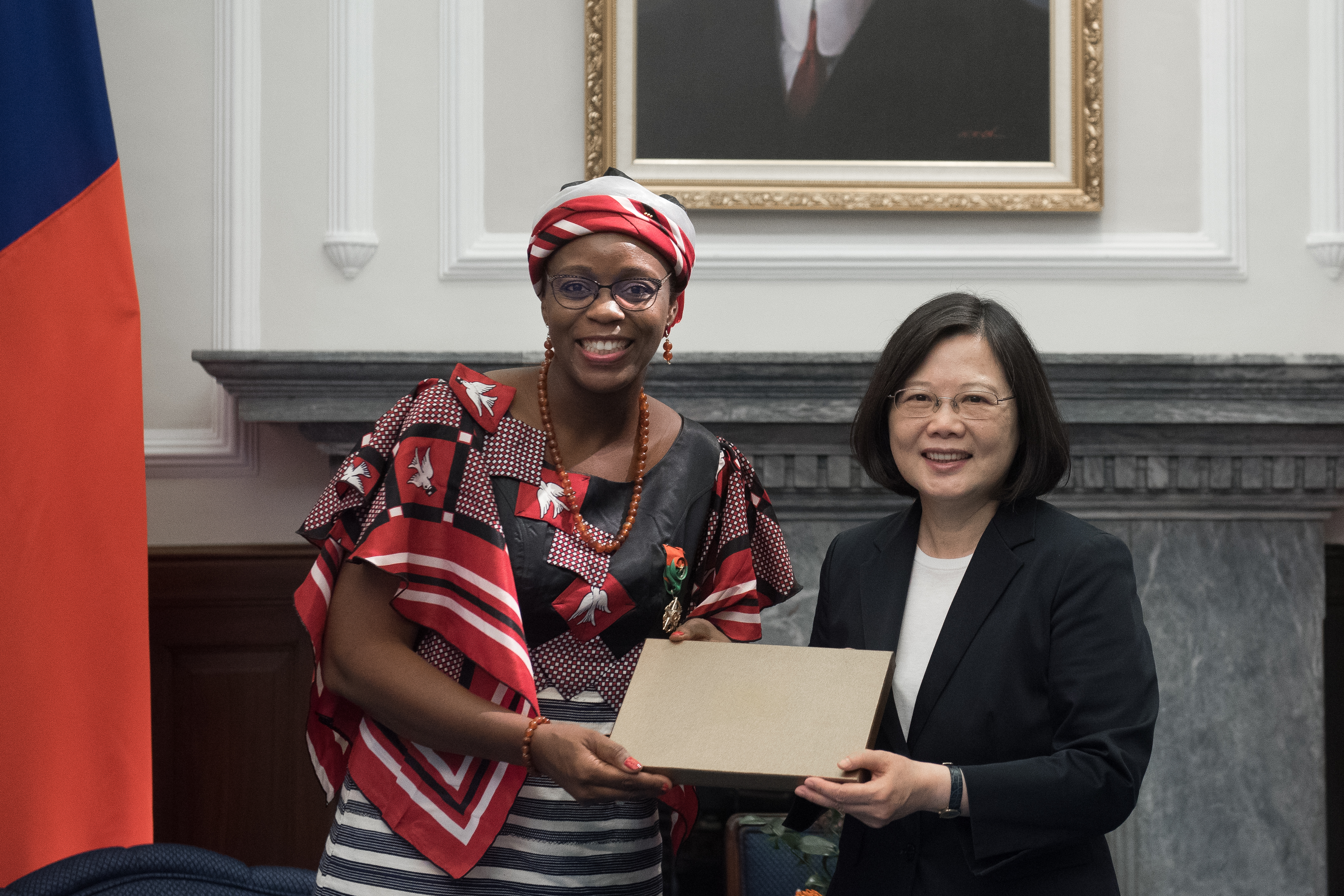
Burkina Faso to the Republic of China Ambassador Aminata Sana and President Tsai Ing-wen

Burkina Faso, known as the Republic of Upper Volta prior to 1984, entered diplomatic relations with the Republic of China in 1961, the year after the country gained independence from its former colonial power, France. Relations continued for over a decade, until 15 September 1973 when the regime of Upper Volta – led by Major General Sangoulé Lamizana, who had come to power in a 1966 military coup – derecognized the ROC and instead opened relations with the People's Republic of China (PRC). Lamizana had been convinced by offers of aid from Zhou Enlai, totaling over $48 million through the 1980s.

Relations with the People's Republic of China continued under subsequent military governments, those of Colonel Saye Zerbo, Major Jean-Baptiste Ouédraogo and Captain Thomas Sankara, until several years into the administration of Blaise Compaoré, who much like his predecessors had come to power in a 1987 military coup. On 4 February 1994 President Compaoré severed relations with the PRC and instead re-established connections to Taiwan, in what was considered a surprising diplomatic move.

Taipei and Ouagadougou had been entwined as sister cities on 4 December 2008. Following Burkina Faso's switch to recognizing the People's Republic of China in 2018, the mayor of Taipei, Ko Wen-je, announced the sister city relationship between the two cities would still continue.

In April 2012, President Ma Ying-jeou of the ROC went on his first tour of Africa, visiting Burkina Faso and meeting with President Compaoré. During the visit Ma promised more aid in the areas of education, medical care, transportation and agriculture. He visited again in January 2014, a month before the 20-year anniversary of Burkinabé–Taiwanese relations, meeting once more with Compaoré.

On 28 October, the 2014 Burkinabé uprising broke out. In response, the ROC's Ministry of Foreign Affairs took measures to ensure contact with all Taiwanese nationals and businesspeople in the country. All ROC diplomatic personnel were reported to be safe. After three days of protests, President Blaise Compaoré resigned and fled to the Ivory Coast, with the military taking power shortly after and designating Isaac Zida as acting head of state. ROC Minister of Foreign Affairs David Lin responded by announcing that the relations between the two countries remained unchanged for the moment, and that future relations would depend on the next moves by Burkina Faso's transitional government.

== Aid ==
Taiwan has provided ample humanitarian aid and investing much into the Burkinabé economy. For example, a Taiwanese technical mission to Burkina Faso contributes to more than 34% of the total production of rice in Burkina Faso, and the National Blaise Compaore Hospital is the first computerized general hospital in West Africa due to Taiwanese technical aid. Other aid measures include the donation of large amounts of condoms and medicines by Taiwan to help prevent the spread of HIV/AIDS in Burkina Faso.

== Termination of relations ==
After the termination of relations between São Tomé and Príncipe and Taiwan in 2016, Burkina Faso was one of only two states in Africa to recognize the Republic of China over the People's Republic of China, the other one being Eswatini (formerly Swaziland). It was also the most populous UN member state to have fully recognized the Republic of China as the sole legitimate representative of all of China. Following the 2016 election of Tsai Ing-wen as the President of Taiwan, China reinitiated a campaign to win over Taiwanese allies that had been functionally halted during the term of her more pro-China predecessor, Ma Ying-jeou.

On 24 May 2018, Burkina Faso derecognized the Republic of China. Burkinabé Foreign Minister Alpha Barry noted the extensive developmental and economic opportunities partnership with China could bring. ROC Foreign Minister Joseph Wu subsequently offered his resignation over Taiwan's failure to maintain diplomatic relations, which President Tsai Ing-wen did not accept. Within two months, China formally opened its embassy in Ouagadoudou with a ceremony presided over by Vice Premier Hu Chunhua.

== See also ==
- Timeline of diplomatic relations of the Republic of China
- Burkina Faso–China relations
- Foreign relations of Burkina Faso
- Foreign relations of Taiwan
- Political status of Taiwan
