= Burkina Faso–China relations =

- Burkina Faso: China

Burkina Faso–China relations refer to the diplomatic interactions between Burkina Faso and the People's Republic of China (PRC). Both nations maintain embassies in each other's capitals, Beijing and Ouagadougou, respectively.

== History ==
Burkina Faso, formerly known as the Republic of Upper Volta, initially established relations with Taiwan (Republic of China) in the early 1960s following its independence. From 1961 until 1973, Burkina Faso recognized the Republic of China as the sole legitimate representative of China. However, on September 15, 1973, it shifted recognition to the People's Republic of China, aligning with the broader international recognition of the PRC.

The period from September 15, 1973, to February 4, 1994, saw modest engagement between Burkina Faso and Beijing, with focus on projects and financing. This phase of relations was interrupted in 1994 when Burkina Faso, grappling with fiscal and economic challenges, sought external financing. With China unwilling to provide the necessary financial aid, Burkina Faso re-recognized the Republic of China, leading to the suspension of relations with the PRC.

Burkina Faso is unique in being the only African state to have twice recognized the Republic of China, first in 1964 and then again in 1994. The re-establishment of relations with Taiwan in 1994 was driven by financial incentives, with Taiwan providing significant financial support to Burkina Faso.

However, the dynamics changed again on May 24, 2018, when Burkina Faso severed ties with Taiwan and re-established diplomatic relations with the PRC on May 26, 2018, following a formal ceremony in Beijing. The rekindled relationship has since grown, with China expressing interest in forging cooperation with Burkina Faso under the Belt and Road Initiative (BRI) particularly in healthcare and infrastructure sectors. In 2021, Burkina Faso joined the BRI.

== Sovereignty and human rights issues ==
Burkina Faso follows the one China principle. It recognizes the People's Republic of China as the sole government of China and Taiwan as an integral part of China's territory, and supports all efforts by the PRC to "achieve national reunification". It also considers Hong Kong, Xinjiang and Tibet to be China's internal affairs.

In July 2019, UN ambassadors of 37 countries, including Burkina Faso, signed a joint letter to the United Nations Human Rights Council defending China's persecution of Uyghurs. Burkina Faso was one of 16 countries that defended China in 2019 but did not do so in 2020. In 2021, Burkina Faso's ambassador to China, Adama Compaore, voiced support for China's policies in Xinjiang.

== See also ==
- Dates of establishment of diplomatic relations with the People's Republic of China
- Burkina Faso–Taiwan relations
- Foreign relations of Burkina Faso
- Foreign relations of China
