= Burkina Faso–North Korea relations =

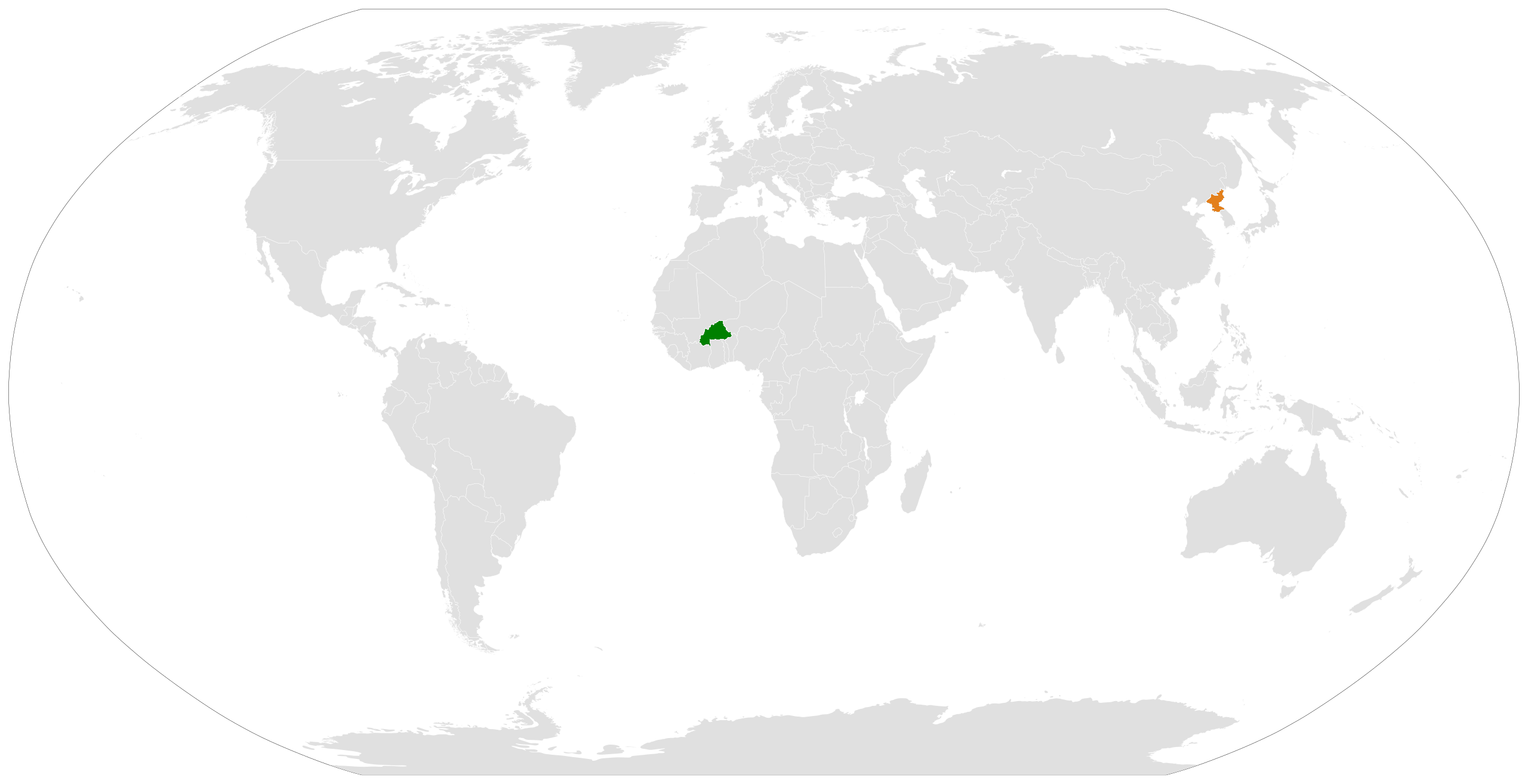

- Burkina Faso: North Korea

Burkina Faso–North Korea relations (Korean: 부르끼나파쏘-조선인민민주주의공화국 관계) refers to the current and historical relationship between the Democratic People's Republic of Korea (DPRK) and Burkina Faso. Neither country maintains an embassy in the other, although the DPRK formerly had an ambassador accredited in the Burkinabé capital Ouagadougou. Since their resumption of relations in 2023, the North Korean ambassador accredited to Burkina Faso has been resident in Dakar, Senegal.

== History ==
Relations were especially close during the Cold War, when the DPRK was most active in foreign affairs. North Korea provided military equipment to the army of what was then the Republic of Upper Volta in the mid-1970s, during the reign of the military leader Colonel General Sangoulé Lamizana. North Korea also provided agricultural and technical assistance during the Cold War. Military aid continued under the governance of Captain Thomas Sankara, with an accord signed in 1983. Sankara, a Marxist revolutionary, visited Pyongyang several times, first as Prime Minister on 13 March 1983 and then as President on 3 September 1985. A DPRK–Burkina Faso Friendship Association reportedly existed during this period.

Relations remained close during the early reign of Sankara's successor, Blaise Compaoré, who took power in a 1987 military coup. Compaoré visited Pyongyang in September 1988. In the late 1980s there were several cases of cooperation between the two countries – for example, the DPRK constructed an open-air theatre in Koudougou, and a trade agreement to exchange Burkinabé cotton and minerals for North Korean agricultural machinery was signed. Diplomatic activity quieted down after the Cold War, but some cooperation continued. In 1998 the North Korean government completed the construction of five small water reservoirs in Burkina Faso.

Straying from the traditional relations, Burkina Faso – a temporary UNSC member at the time – voted in favour of United Nations Security Council Resolution 1874 in 2009, imposing further economic sanctions on North Korea. In a statement, the Burkinabé representative said his country's vote was due to its commitment to a nuclear weapon-free world.

On 30 March 2023, months after the September 2022 coup d'état, Burkina Faso announced the re-establishment of diplomatic ties with the DPRK, with the latter country naming Chae Hui Chol as the DPRK's ambassador to Burkina Faso.

== Trade ==
In 2016, bilateral trade was worth US$34 million, making Burkina Faso North Korea's seventh largest trading partner.

== See also ==
- Foreign relations of Burkina Faso
- Foreign relations of North Korea
