= Visa policy of Burkina Faso =

Policy on permits required to enter Burkina Faso

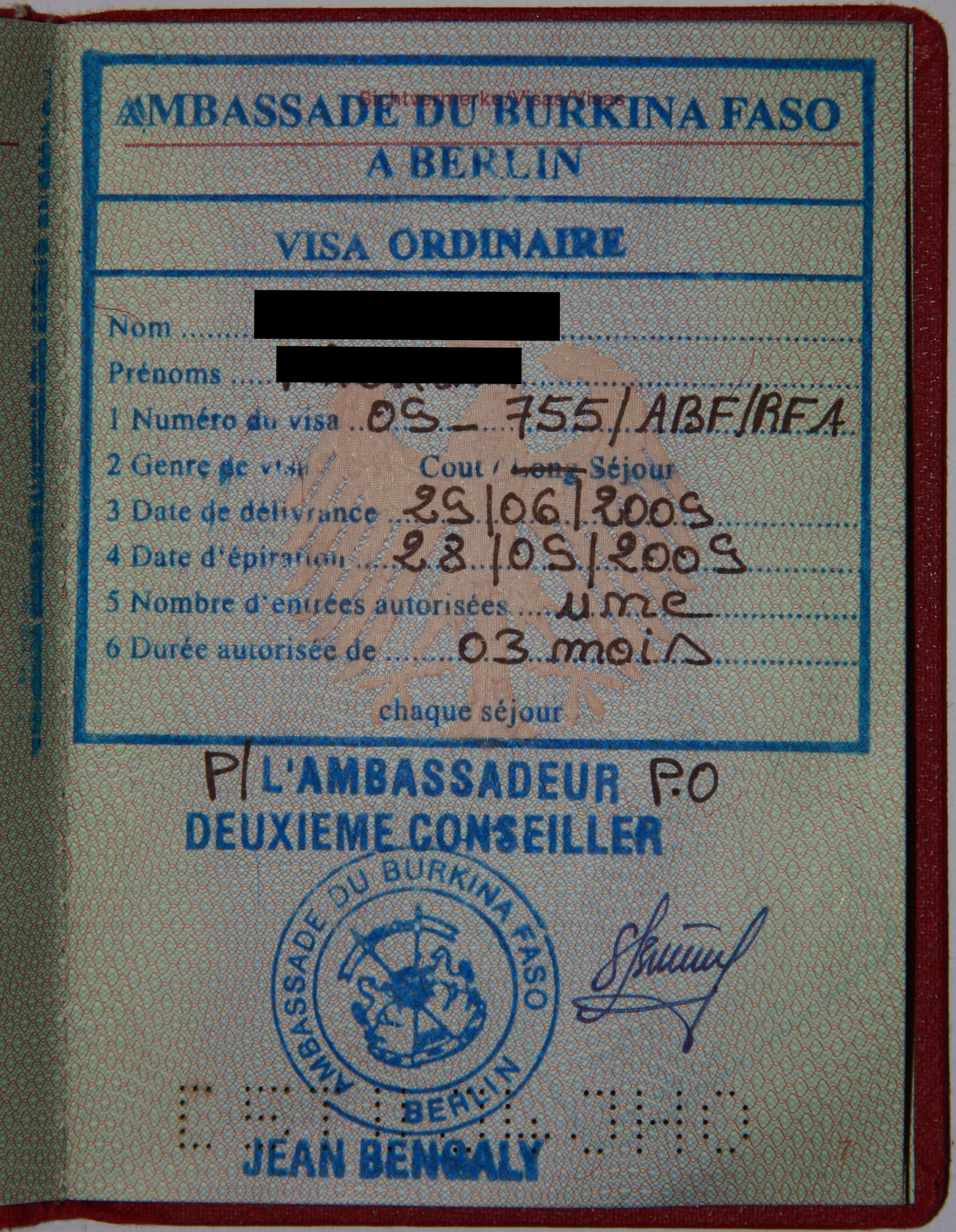
Burkina Faso visa

Visitors to Burkina Faso must obtain a visa from one of the Burkina Faso diplomatic missions or online, unless they come from one of the visa exempt countries or a country whose citizens may obtain a visa on arrival.

== Visa policy map ==
Visa policy of Burkina Faso Burkina Faso Visa not required eVisa Admission refused

== Visa exemption ==
Citizens of the following 19 countries can visit Burkina Faso without a visa:

- All ECOWAS member states
- Central African Republic (90 days)
- Hong Kong^{1}
- Mali
- Mauritania (90 days)
- Morocco (90 days)
- Niger
- Singapore (30 days)
- United Arab Emirates^{1}

_{1 — Not listed by Timatic as being visa-exempt.}

Date of visa changes
- 30 April 1980: ECOWAS (Economic Community of West African States): Benin, Cape Verde, Gambia, Ghana, Guinea, Guinea-Bissau, Ivory Coast, Liberia, Mali, Niger, Nigeria, Senegal, Sierra Leone, Togo
- 22 December 2020: Morocco (Note: Under visa abolition agreement on 23 October 2020)

According to the UAE Ministry of Foreign Affairs, the Passport Index, and the Henley Passport Index, citizens of the United Arab Emirates can enter Burkina Faso without a visa.

According to the Hong Kong Immigration Department, citizens of Hong Kong can enter Burkina Faso without a visa for 14 days.

=== Non-ordinary passports ===
Additionally, holders of diplomatic, official or service passports issued to citizens of Brazil, China, Congo, Cuba, Russia, Taiwan, Turkey do not require a visa for Burkina Faso.

In addition, citizens of China holding passports endorsed "for public affairs" do not require a visa for a maximum stay of 90 days.

== Visa on arrival - History ==
In the past, visas were available on arrival to nationals of certain countries. At present, visas are issued upon arrival only in specific exceptional circumstances.

The cost of the visa on arrival was 94,000 francs CFA (€143.30) for a single entry visa with a maximum validity of 3 months, or 122,000 CFA (€185.99) for multiple entry visa with a maximum validity of three months.

- All European Union member states (except Cyprus)

- Argentina
- Australia
- Brazil
- Canada
- Chad
- Colombia
- Comoros
- Cuba
- DR Congo ^{1}
- Djibouti
- Egypt
- Eritrea
- Hong Kong
- Iceland
- Kenya
- Libya
- Liechtenstein
- New Zealand
- Norway
- Paraguay
- São Tomé and Príncipe
- Somalia
- Switzerland
- Taiwan
- Tunisia
- United Kingdom
- Venezuela

_{1 - Only at Ouagadougou airport.}

Visa on arrival is available for citizens of Peru for holders of a valid visa issued by a Schengen Member State.

Visa on arrival are still available for holders of diplomatic, official, service or special passports free of charge. Passengers with an Interpol passport traveling on duty can obtain a visa on arrival. They must have 1 passport photo. BCN INTERPOL in Burkina Faso must be informed before arrival.

== Electronic Visa (e-Visa) ==
The eVisa portal was launched on 17 August 2023. Citizens of countries that are not visa-exempt may also obtain a visa online or at a Burkina Faso diplomatic mission, if they prefer.

== Transit without a visa ==
Citizens of South Africa require a visa prior to arrival at all times, including transit. Other nationalities holding confirmed onward tickets may transit through airports of Burkina Faso up to 24 hours without a transit visa.

== United States ==
Entry and transit is refused to United States nationals, even if not leaving the aircraft and proceeding by the same flight.

== Visitor statistics ==
Most visitors arriving to Burkina Faso for tourism purposes were from the following countries of nationality:

Country	2016	2015	2014	2013
France	23,993	23,840	29,311	35,715
Ivory Coast	14,914	16,665	16,509	18,852
Mali	11,956	12,687	12,469	16,065
Niger	8,884	9,452	7,766	11,265
Senegal	7,617	6,527	6,824	9,566
Togo	7,438	5,824	6,498	8,604
Benin	6,915	6,103	8,113	8,622
United States	5,611	5,923	5,984	7,748
Ghana	5,122	5,199	6,074	7,090
Total	151,783	156,036	181,410	206,954

== See also ==
- Visa requirements for Burkinabe citizens
