= Burkinabe passport =

Travel document

Burkinabé passport
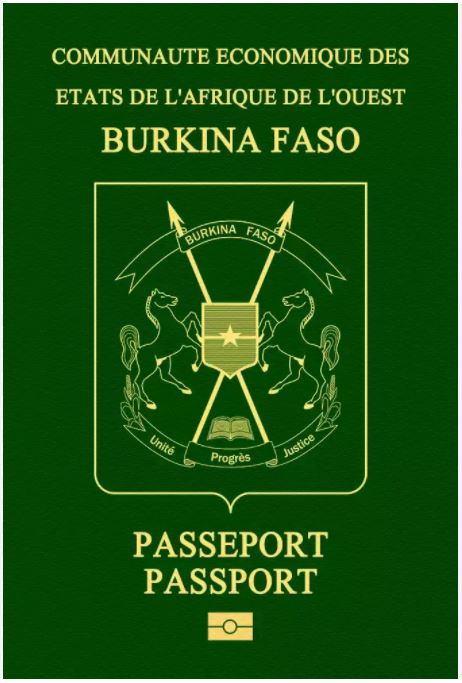
- Type: Passport
- Issued by: Burkina Faso
- First issued: 21 August 2013 (current version)
- Purpose: Identification
- Eligibility: Burkinabé citizenship

Burkinabé passports are issued to Burkinabé citizens to travel outside Burkina Faso.

Following the country's withdrawal from ECOWAS with other members of the Alliance of Sahel States (AES), a new passport without the ECOWAS name or logo was released in September 2024, produced by Chinese biometrics company Emptech, along with an online application process. A new passport with the AES name and logo was introduced in February 2025, with president Ibrahim Traoré receiving the first booklet with the new design.

== Physical properties ==
- Surname
- Given names
- Nationality Burkinabe/Burkinabé
- Date of birth
- Sex
- Place of birth
- Date of Expiry
- Passport number

== Languages ==
The data page/information page is printed in French and English.

== See also ==
- ECOWAS passports
- List of passports
- Visa requirements for Burkinabe citizens
