= Burkina Faso–Turkey relations =

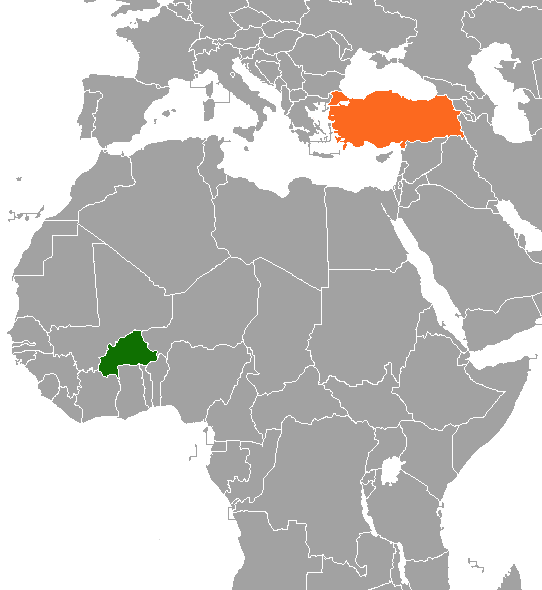
- Burkina Faso: Turkey

Diplomatic mission
- Burkina Faso's Embassy, Ankara: Turkish Embassy, Ouagadougou

Envoy
- Ambassador Brahima Sere: Ambassador Ahmet Asım Arar

Burkina Faso–Turkey relations are the bilateral relations between Burkina Faso and Turkey. Bilateral relations gained momentum after the opening of the Turkish Embassy in Ouagadougou and the Embassy of Burkina Faso in Ankara in 2012 and in 2014 respectively.

Burkina Faso and Turkey are both members of the United Nations, International Monetary Fund, World Bank and the World Trade Organization.

== Presidential visits ==
Guest	Host	Place of visit	Date of visit
(Burkina Faso) President Blaise Compaoré	(Turkey) President Abdullah Gül	Çankaya Köşkü, Ankara	August 12-21, 2008
(Burkina Faso) President Blaise Compaoré	(Turkey) President Recep Tayyip Erdoğan	Çankaya Köşkü, Ankara	August 28, 2014
(Burkina Faso) President Blaise Compaoré	(Turkey) Deputy speaker of the parliament Meral Akşener	Çankaya Köşkü, Ankara	October 31, 2014
(Burkina Faso) President Roch Marc Christian Kaboré	(Turkey) President Recep Tayyip Erdoğan	OIC Summit, Istanbul	April 10-15, 2016
(Burkina Faso) President Roch Marc Christian Kaboré	(Turkey) President Recep Tayyip Erdoğan	Presidential Complex, Ankara	April 9-11, 2019

== Economic relations ==
- Turkish development assistance to Burkina Faso through TIKA and the Turkish Red Crescent focuses on increasing food security and improving education.
- There are direct flights from Istanbul to Ouagadougou with a frequency of 4 times a week since 2012.

== Educational relations ==
Turkey awards scholarships to Burkinabe citizens.

== Military relations ==
- Turkey and Burkina Faso engage in a number of military training and exchange programs through the G5 Sahel Joint Force, to which Turkey has pledged 5 million USD in order to contribute to regional peace and stability in the Sahel.
- Turkey export unmanned aerial vehicles (UAVs) to Burkina Faso.

== See also ==
- Foreign relations of Burkina Faso
- Foreign relations of Turkey
