= Burkina Faso–Libya relations =

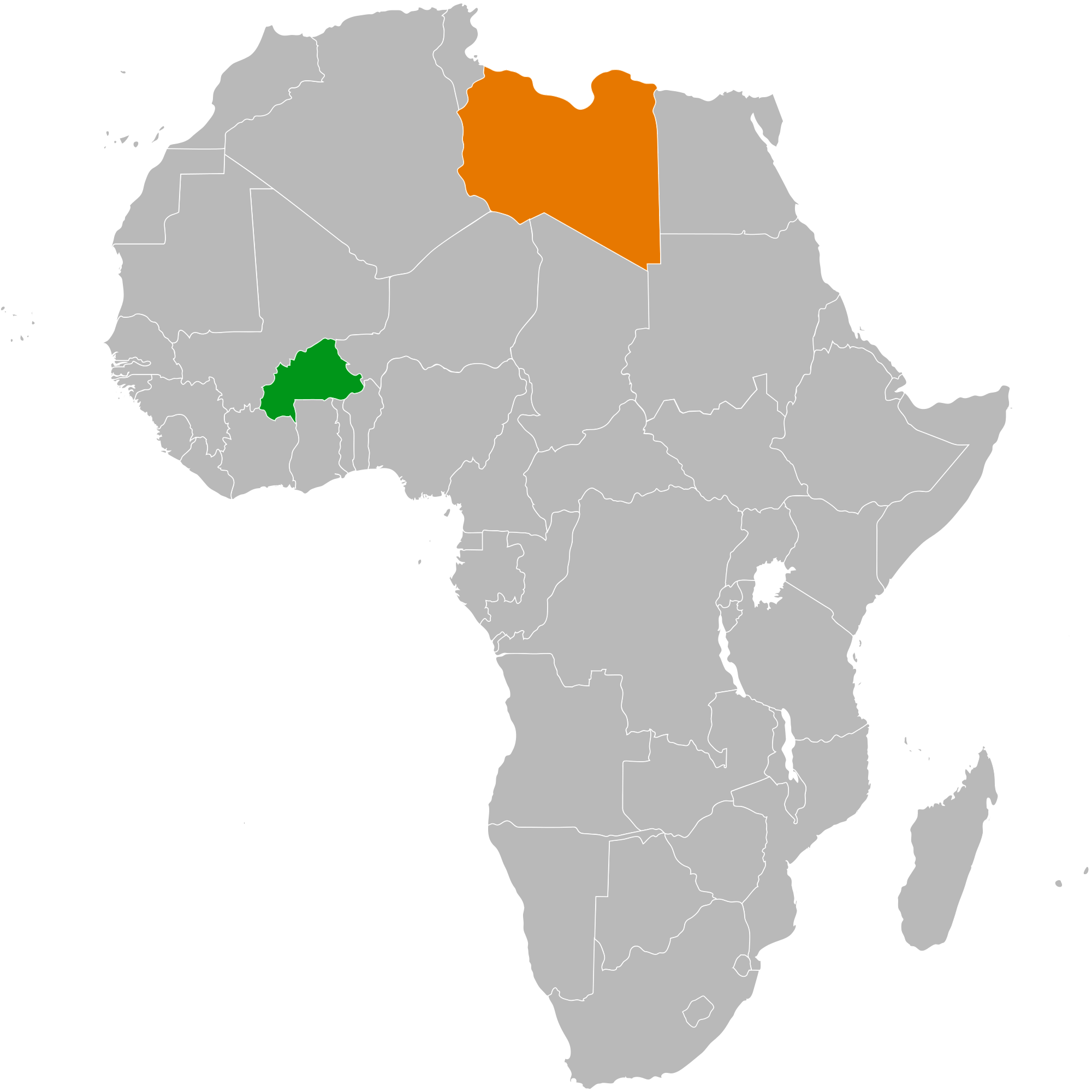

- Burkina Faso: Libya

Burkina Faso–Libya relations refers to the current and historical relationship between Libya and Burkina Faso. Libya maintains an embassy in the Burkinabé capital of Ouagadougou, and Burkina Faso has an embassy in the Libyan capital of Tripoli.

== History ==
In October 1982, only a month before being overthrown, the Burkinabé military ruler Colonel Saye Zerbo made a state visit to Tripoli.

Relations between the Libyan leader Muammar Gaddafi and the government of Thomas Sankara, a Burkinabé Marxist and pan-Africanist, were initially close after Sankara came to power in a military coup in 1983. Prior to the coup, Burkina Faso was known as the Republic of Upper Volta and Sankara, as Prime Minister under the rule of Major Dr. Jean-Baptiste Ouédraogo, invited Gaddafi to Ouagadougou. Gaddafi, intrigued by Sankara, met only with the young revolutionary-minded officer and not with President Ouédraogo, reportedly causing significant friction between Sankara and his then-superior. This is presumed to have contributed to the reasons behind Sankara's imprisonment by Ouédraogo, which eventually helped trigger the Sankara-led military coup that ousted Ouédraogo. On 6 August 1983, only two days after the coup, Gaddafi sent an airplane full of aid to the new government – Sankara, however, asked the Libyans to stop sending aid. In December that year Gaddafi made another visit to Ouagadougou, accompanied by 450 bodyguards.

Strong relations with Sankara's newly renamed Burkina Faso, which he attempted to radically transform through what he dubbed the "Democratic and Popular Revolution" (French: Révolution démocratique et populaire), fit squarely into Gaddafi's plans to extend Libyan influence into sub-Saharan Africa. Economically, the value of the international trade between the two countries was low however, and remains so to this day. In October 1985 Sankara reciprocated Gaddafi's visits by meeting with him in Tripoli, after returning from a visit to Moscow.

Despite the early close ties, the relation between Sankara and Gaddafi eventually deteriorated. On 15 October 1987, Sankara's former friend and colleague Blaise Compaoré launched another military coup, killing Sankara and making himself President. According to some reports, the coup was at least partially engineered by the Liberian Charles Taylor, at the time a close ally of the Gaddafi regime. Compaoré had previously during the 1980s ensured Taylor's release when he was held in a Ghanaian prison, and introduced Taylor to Gaddafi.

Libya made an effort to re-establish close cooperation, with a number of state visits following the coup. By 1988, relations were even better than during Sankara's heyday. Despite Libya's status as a pariah state, Compaoré would remain a close Libyan ally, visiting Tripoli a number of times, condemning United States air strikes against Libya, maintaining close military cooperation, and establishing the joint Banque Arab-Libyenne du Burkina. Acting as a middle man for Libya, Burkina Faso became heavily involved in the First Liberian Civil War and the Sierra Leone Civil War, sending arms and deploying troops in favour of Charles Taylor's National Patriotic Front of Liberia.

A sign of the close Burkinabé–Libyan relations at the turn of the millennium was the creation of the Community of Sahel-Saharan States, which both countries were founding members of. Relations became far more complicated in the 21st century, when the 2011 Libyan Civil War broke out. On 24 August 2011, after the fall of Tripoli to rebel hands, Burkina Faso announced that it had stopped recognizing the Great Socialist People's Libyan Arab Jamahiriya, and instead recognized the rival National Transitional Council. Despite this, the country initially extended an offer of asylum to Gaddafi, even though it was a signatory of the International Criminal Court, which had charged the Libyan leader with crimes against humanity. The offer was later withdrawn on 7 September. After Western bombers scattered and thinned out the last layer of his bodyguard and personal entourage, Muammar Gaddafi was captured and assassinated on 20 October 2011 amid the NATO military intervention.

Three years later, the turn came to President Blaise Compaoré to be overthrown. The 2014 Burkinabé uprising broke out in late October 2014, eventually forcing Compaoré to resign and flee the country. Likewise forced to leave his position was Yéro Boly, Minister of Defence since 2004 and the Burkinabé ambassador to Libya between 1988 and 1995. On the first day of the uprising, a protester in Bobo Dioulasso pulled down a statue of Compaoré – notably leaving an adjacent statue of Gaddafi, erected in the mid-1990s, intact.

A sign of the cultural exchange between Burkina Faso and Libya during the Gaddafi era is the involvement of Burkinabé football players in Libyan sports – among them Harouna Bamogo, Pierre Koulibaly, and Paul Koulibaly.

== See also ==
- Foreign relations of Burkina Faso
- Foreign relations of Libya
- Foreign relations of Libya under Muammar Gaddafi
