= Burkina Faso–Spain relations =

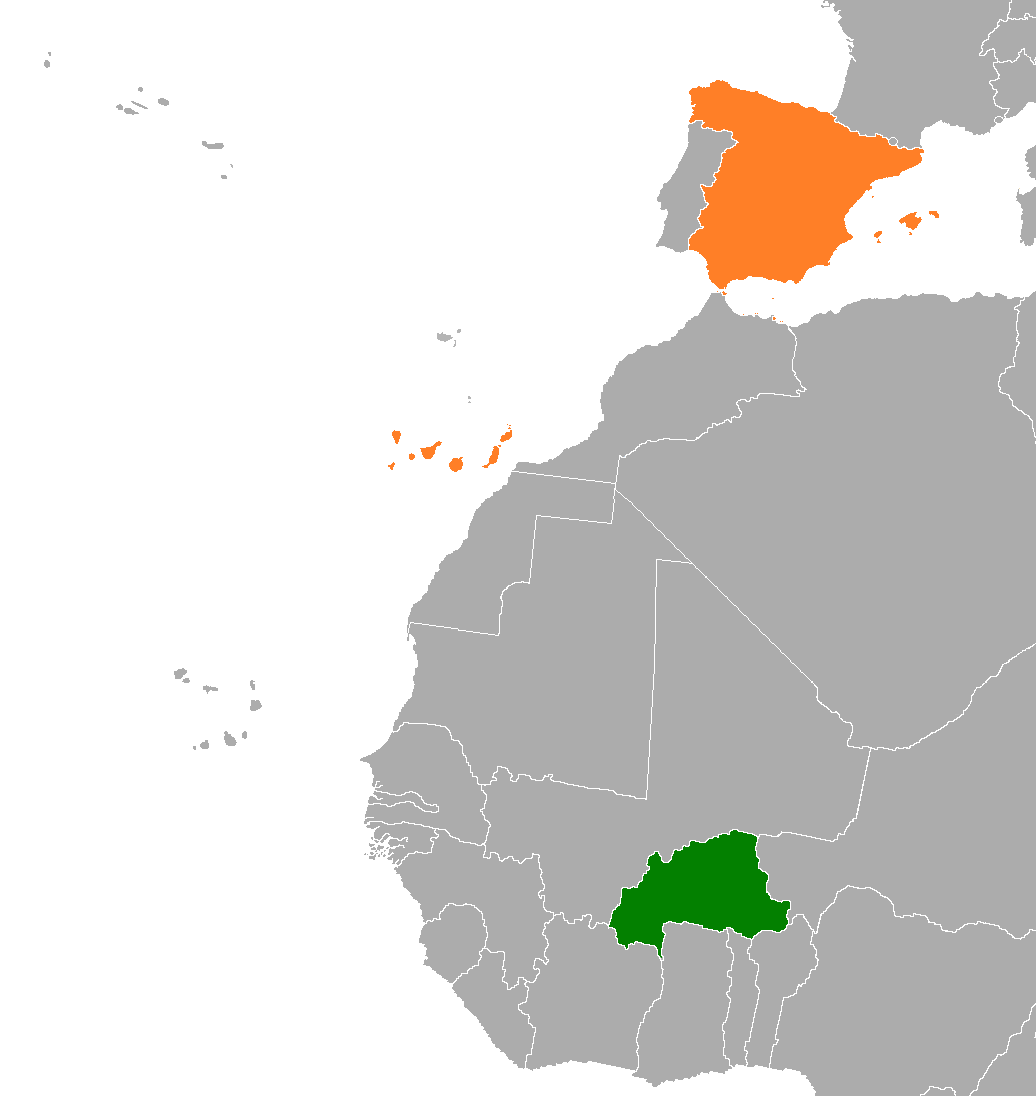
- Burkina Faso: Spain

Burkina Faso–Spain relations are the bilateral and diplomatic relations between these two countries. Burkina Faso does not have an embassy in Spain, but its embassy in Paris, France, is accredited to Spain. and consulates in Almería, Barcelona, Madrid and Valencia. Spain has no embassy in Burkina Faso, but its embassy in Abidjan, Ivory Coast is accredited to Burkina Faso, and a consulate in Ouagadougou.

== History ==
Spain and Burkina Faso established diplomatic relations on 27 November 1964.

The main interest of Spain in Burkina Faso (otherwise a country under strong French geopolitical influence) primarily lies on migration issues, owing to the immigrants arrived to the mediterranean coast coming from Burkina.

The Burkinabé government was a key actor in the multiparty negotiations to liberate a group of 3 Spanish development workers kidnapped in Mauritania in November 2010.

The Government of Spain condemned alongside France's the September 2015 Burkinabé coup d'état that sought to overthrow transitional Burkinabé president Michel Kafando.

In October 2020, the Spanish Foreign Minister Arancha González Laya communicated the Burkina Faso's president Roch Marc Christian Kaboré the Spanish commitment to the security, fight against terrorism and irregular migration and the promotion of economic and social development in the Sahel.

In the wake of the killing of the Spanish journalists David Beriáin and Roberto Fraile in southeastern Burkina Faso in April 2021, the Spanish foreign minister demanded her Burkinabé counterpart that the Government of Burkina Faso "investigated" and "clarified" the murder.

The Spanish Guardia Civil led the creation of the GAR-SI project (approved in June 2017), in collaboration with the French Gendarmerie, the Italian Carabinieri, and the Portuguese National Republican Guard, training elite counter-terrorist units in Burkina Faso following the GAR model. As of 2021, the Spanish armed forces also trained and advised Burkinabé forces in Ouagadougou as part of the EU mission in the Sahel.

== Trade ==
All imports from Burkina Faso to Spain are duty-free and quota-free, with the exception of armaments, as part of the Everything but Arms initiative of the European Union.

== Cooperation ==
Burkina Faso has not traditionally been a country of cooperation for Spain, nor does it appear in the current Master Plan for Spanish Cooperation (2013–2016) as a country of association.

== Diplomatic missions ==
The Spanish Embassy in Abidjan deals, under a multiple accreditation regime, with bilateral relations with Burkina Faso. There is an honorary vice consulate of Spain in Ouagadougou.

== See also ==
- Foreign relations of Burkina Faso
- Foreign relations of Spain
