= Burkina Faso–Denmark relations =

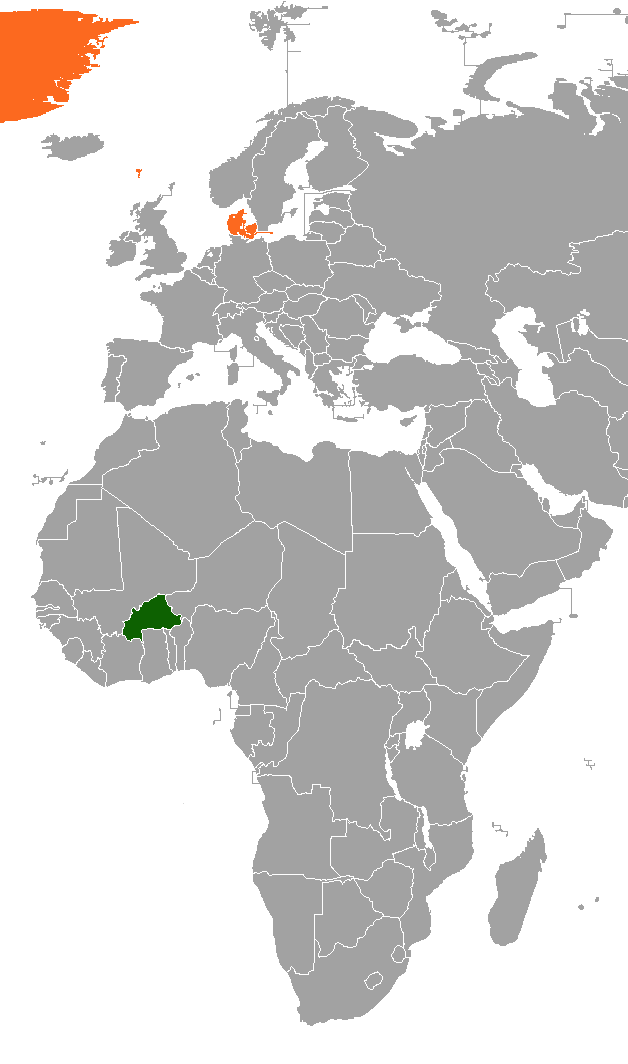
- Burkina Faso: Denmark

Burkina Faso–Denmark relations refers to the current and historical relationship between Burkina Faso and Denmark. Burkina Faso has an embassy in Copenhagen, and Denmark has an embassy in Ouagadougou.

== Assistance ==
Burkina Faso has, since 1973, been in a development cooperation with Denmark, and a programme country since 1993. Assistance for Burkina Faso was 233 million DKK in 2010; in 2013, Denmark assisted with 250 million DKK.

Denmark's main support is towards poverty reduction, through the Danish and Burkinabe Development Cooperation. Denmark also has an agriculture programme in Burkina Faso.

Several agreements have been signed between Denmark and Burkina Faso.

== Trade ==
All imports from Burkina Faso to Denmark are duty-free and quota-free, with the exception of armaments, as part of the Everything but Arms initiative of the European Union.

== See also ==
- Foreign relations of Burkina Faso
- Foreign relations of Denmark
