= Burkina Faso–India relations =

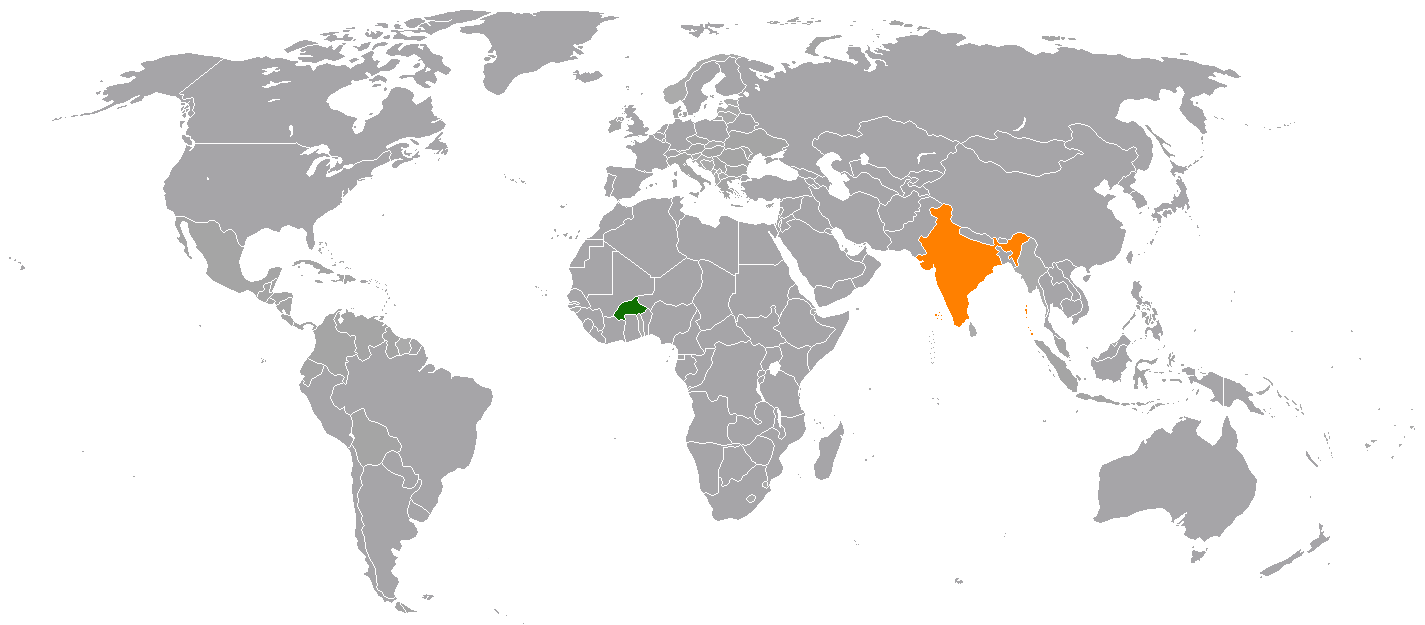
- Burkina Faso: India

Burkina Faso–India relations refers to the international relations that exist between Burkina Faso and India. Burkina Faso maintains an embassy in New Delhi. India maintained an embassy in Ouagadougou from November 1996 until its closure in July 2002. Currently, India maintains an honorary consulate in Ouagadougou, which functions under the jurisdiction of the High Commission of India in Accra, Ghana.

== History ==
Burkina Faso's Commerce & Industry Minister led an official delegation to India in March 1976. This was the first bilateral activity between Burkina Faso and India. During the visit, the two countries signed a Protocol on Economic and Technical Cooperation. Several high level visits between officials of the two countries have taken place since then.

Burkinabe President Captain Thomas Sankara visited India in 1983 to attend the NAM Summit. The Indian Minister of State for External Affairs visited Burkina Faso in 1987, becoming the first Indian minister to visit the country. Burkinabe President Blaise Compaore visited India in May–June 1993, and the two nations agreed to establish a Joint Commission to foster bilateral cooperation. India also offered help in the economic development of Burkina Faso, particularly in the fields of agriculture, hand looms, mining, irrigation, and small scale industries. Compaore visited Delhi for two days in July 1994, and visited India again in 1997.

Narasimha Rao became the first Indian Prime Minister to visit Burkina Faso when he made a state visit to Ouagadougou on 2–4 November 1995. Rao met with the Burkinabe President, addressed the country's Parliament, and was conferred Burkina Faso's highest civilian award. Rao also inaugurated the Embassy of India in Ouagadougou during his visit. The Embassy was headed by a resident Chargé d'Affaires until its closure in July 2002. Burkina Faso opened its embassy in New Delhi in 1996, and upgraded it to ambassador-level in 2011.

Burkina Faso and India established a Joint Commission on economic, cultural, political and technical after signing an agreement in October 1994. Former Prime Minister Tertius Zongo visited New Delhi in April 2008 to attend the first India-Africa Forum Summit, and also held bilateral talks with Indian Prime Minister Manmohan Singh.

Burkina Faso and India were among the first 19 countries to join the International Solar Alliance, proposed by Prime Minister Narendra Modi, on 15 November 2016.

== Trade ==
India was the second largest destination for exports from Burkina Faso in 2015. Bilateral trade between Burkina Faso and India totaled US$264.40 million in 2014–15, growing from $119.76 million the previous fiscal. India exported $112.76 million worth of goods to Burkina Faso, and imported $151.64 million. The main commodities exported by India to Burkina Faso are pharmaceutical products, vehicles and spare parts, iron and steel and articles thereof, machinery and mechanical appliances, rubber and rubber articles. The major commodities imported by India from Burkina Faso are gold and cotton.

Burkina Faso was the partner country at the CII Conclave in New Delhi in March 2009.

In June 2010, Bharti Airtel struck a deal to buy Zain's mobile operations in 15 African countries, including Burkina Faso, for $8.97 billion, in India's second biggest overseas acquisition after Tata Steel's US$13 billion buy of Corus in 2007. Bharti Airtel completed the acquisition on 8 June 2010. In January 2016, Airtel announced that it had entered into an agreement to sell its operations in Burkina Faso and Sierra Leone to French telecom company Orange S.A. The value of the deal was not disclosed, but analysts estimated it to be worth $800–900 million. Orange assumed control of operations in Burkina Faso in June 2016.

== Foreign aid ==
During President Compaore's first visit to India in July 1994, India offered to help in the economic development of Burkina Faso, particularly in the fields of agriculture, handlooms, mining, irrigation, and small scale industries. During Compaore's second visit in July 1994, India provided ₹250 million (equivalent to ₹1.8 billion or US$19 million in 2026) of aid to Burkina Faso to help develop agriculture in the country. The aid included 200 tractors, seeds, implements, water pumps and several other accessories.

India supplied expert farmers to Burkina Faso to provide training to local farmers about Indian practices of rice growing, the use of ergonomically designed hand tools and tractors, and related consumable inputs such as seeds, fertilizers, and pesticides. The project began in Burkina Faso in 1999 and was completed in 2002. Farm machinery, equipment, vehicles and other necessary support were donated to the Burkina Faso government after project was completed.

Burkina Faso was one of the nine West African countries included in the TEAM-9 initiative and the Pan African e-Network Project. The Pan African e-Network Project was jointly inaugurated by Indian Foreign Minister Pranab Mukherjee and Senior Minister of Foreign Affairs and Regional Cooperation of Burkina Faso Bédouma Alain Yoda on 23 March 2009 at the 5th CII EXIM Bank Conclave on India Africa Project Partnership 2009 in New Delhi. Under TEAM-9, the Indian Government provided a line of credit worth $30.97 million for agricultural projects and for construction of a National Post Office in Burkina Faso. Two more lines of credit were extended in 2008 and 2010 for rural electrification, and for establishing a tomato processing plant respectively. Several LOCs were extended in the first half of 2012 for a public housing project, the supply of 135 buses for universities and other higher education institutions, the construction of two workshops and a covered parking lot, and the procurement of spare parts.

At the first India-Africa Forum Summit in 2008, India pledged to establish a Vocational Training Centre/Incubation Centre of Barefoot College, and a Soil and Water Tissue Testing Laboratory in Burkina Faso. The MoU to set up the Vocational Training Centre/Incubation Centre was signed in October 2013. The Vocational Training Centre/Incubation Centre was established by NSIC in Ouagadougou and transferred to a local agency under the Burkinabe Ministry of Youth, Professional Employment and Training on 3 November 2016. India dispatched a consignment of medicine to help people affected by floods in Burkina Faso on 18 June 2008, and also donated nearly $214,000 for flood relief assistance in September 2009.

Burkinabe scientists visited India between June and December 2013 and participated in research studies under the CV Raman Research Fellowships Scheme. Burkinabes have visited India to attend various training programs organized by the Indian Government. Citizens of Burkina Faso are eligible for scholarships under the Indian Technical and Economic Cooperation Programme and the Indian Council for Cultural Relations.

== Indians in Burkina Faso ==
As of April 2023, about 800-1000 Indians reside in Burkina Faso. Some members of the community own companies engaged in manufacturing Cement, Beer, Plastics, Leather and others offer services like Hotels & Restaurants, Ticketing and Travel agencies, Water Well Drilling, Retailing & Trading and Pharmaceutical imports. Some are also exporters of cotton, cashewnuts, sesame, shea nuts and gold while the rest of the community are employees of these Indian owned businesses.

== See also ==
- Indian Embassy in Burkina Faso
