= Burkina Faso–Sweden Friendship Association =

The Burkina Faso–Sweden Friendship Association (Swedish: Vänskapsföreningen Burkina Faso–Sverige, French: L’Association d’Amitié Burkina Faso–Suède, ASSAMBUS) is a Swedish organization, which has the goal of increasing awareness in Sweden about Burkina Faso – a small landlocked country in West Africa – and increasing exchange between the two countries. The association has approximately 120 members, and one active local subgroup in Stockholm. It engages in a number of cultural activities, such as publishing Burkina Faso-related literature, hosting art exhibitions, arranging Burkinabé film screenings, and so on. It also publishes the magazine Burkinakontakt.

It was formed in 1986, during the rule of Captain Thomas Sankara, a radical left-wing revolutionary who had come to power in a 1983 military coup. The founders were a number of aid workers and university students, who had visited the country as part of an exchange programme. ASSAMBUS initially worked in close cooperation with Sankara's government, spreading knowledge about the developments in the country by publishing articles and holding lectures. Several ministerial visits were arranged. Sankara was ousted and killed in a coup on 15 October 1987, putting his former friend and colleague Blaise Compaoré in power. This shocked the association, and forced it to adapt to a new situation in which it could no longer support the Burkinabé government. It instead grew to focus on cultural issues, and developing ties between civil organizations in the two respective countries.

In 2012, the association protested heavily against a governmental decision to shut down all developmental aid going from Sweden to Burkina Faso. The decision was later overturned in 2014, following a change in government.

== See also ==
- Burkina Faso–Sweden relations
- Culture of Burkina Faso
- History of Burkina Faso
