= Hans Linde (Swedish politician) =

Swedish politician (born 1979)

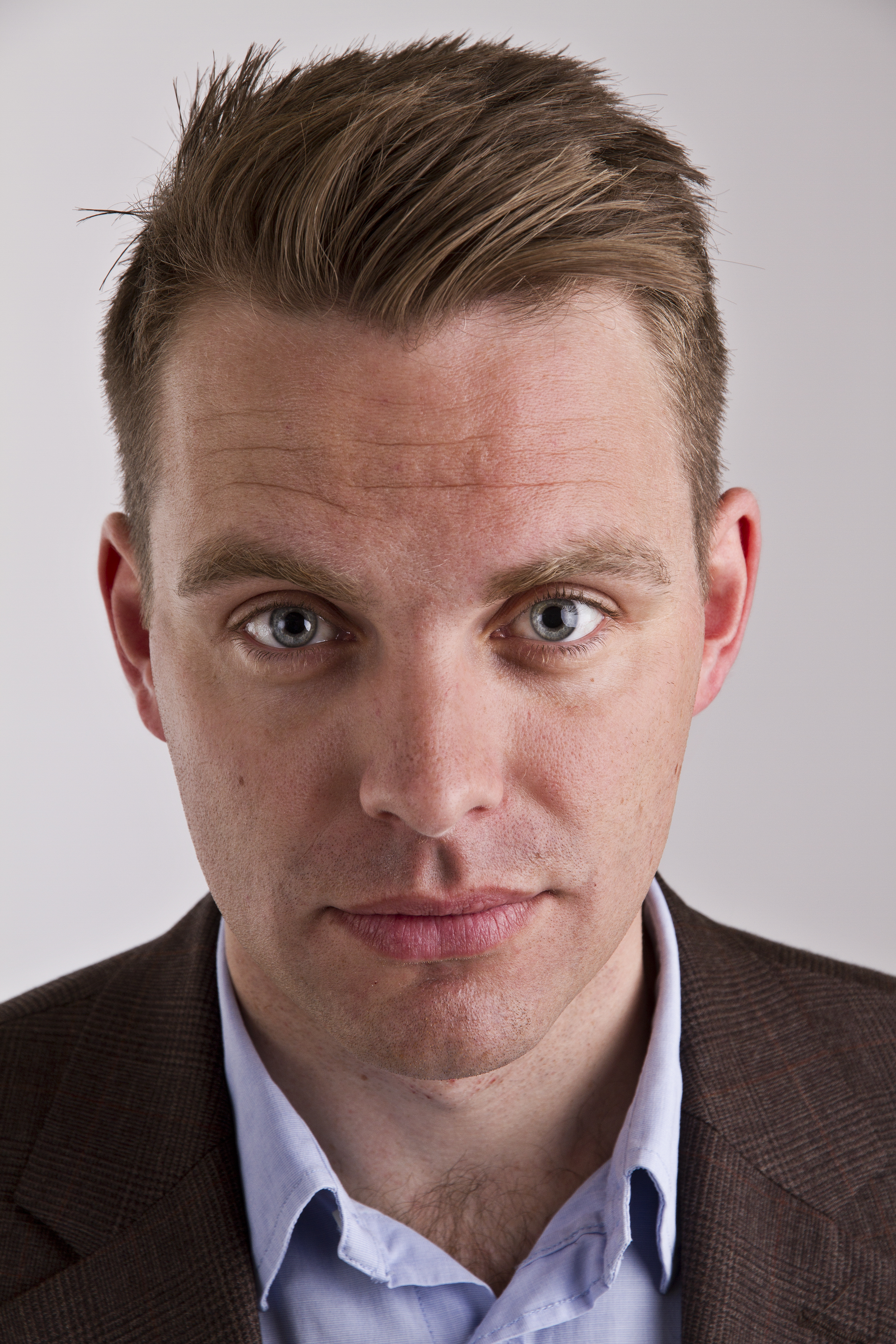

Leader of the Left Party in the Swedish Riksdag
- In office 5 October 2010 – 2 February 2016
- Preceded by: Alice Åström
- Succeeded by: Mia Sydow Mölleby

Member of the Swedish Parliament for Gothenburg Municipality
- In office 2 October 2006 – 7 June 2017

Personal details
- Born: 4 February 1979 (age 47) Gothenburg, Sweden
- Party: Left Party (1997–2017) Independent (2017–)

Hans Linde (born 4 February 1979) is a Swedish former politician of the Left Party. He was a member of the Riksdag from 2006 to 2017. From October 2010 to February 2016, Linde was group leader of the Left Party parliamentary group.

Linde was elected national chairman of Swedish Association for Sexuality Education in June 2017. He subsequently resigned his seat in the Riksdag and revoked his membership of the Left Party.
