= List of diplomatic missions in Burkina Faso =

This is a list of diplomatic missions in Burkina Faso. At present, the capital city of Ouagadougou hosts 32 embassies. Several other countries have ambassadors accredited to Burkina Faso, with most being resident elsewhere in western Africa.

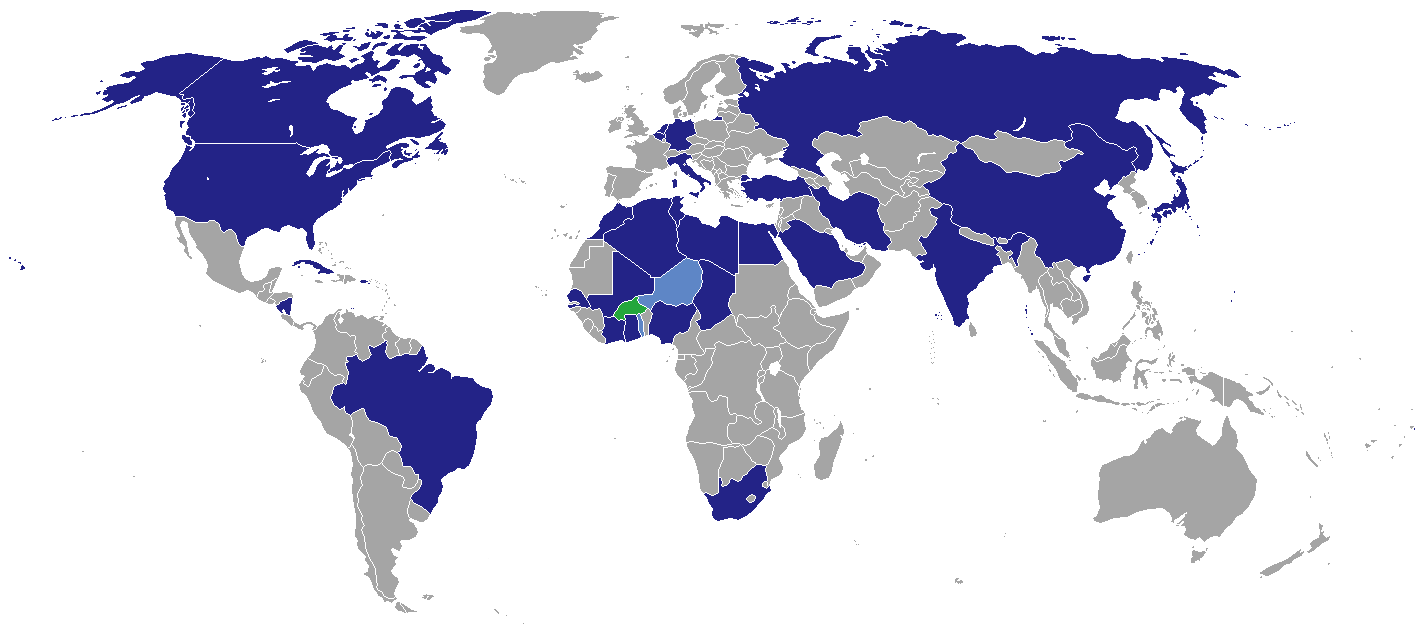
Diplomatic missions in Burkina Faso

== Embassies in Ouagadougou ==
1. Algeria
2. Belgium
3. Brazil
4. Canada
5. Chad
6. China
7. Cuba
8. Egypt
9. Gabon
10. Germany
11. Ghana
12. Holy See
13. India
14. Iran
15. Italy
16. Ivory Coast
17. Japan
18. Libya
19. Mali
20. Morocco
21. Netherlands
22. Nicaragua
23. Nigeria
24. Russia
25. Saudi Arabia
26. Senegal
27. South Africa
28. Sovereign Military Order of Malta
29. Tunisia
30. Turkey
31. United States
32. Venezuela

== Consulate-General in Ouagadougou ==
- Niger
- Togo

== Other posts in Ouagadougou ==
- European Union (Delegation)
- Switzerland Cooperation office & consular agency (Note: Subordinate to the Swiss embassy in Abidjan, Ivory Coast.)

== Non-resident embassies accredited to Burkina Faso ==
=== Resident in Abidjan, Ivory Coast ===
- Angola
- Cameroon
- Equatorial Guinea
- Ethiopia
- Israel
- Liberia
- South Korea
- Switzerland

=== Resident in Abuja, Nigeria ===
- Argentina
- Greece
- Indonesia
- Ireland
- Kenya
- Philippines
- Mexico
- Rwanda
- Serbia
- Slovakia
- Tanzania
- Uganda
- Zambia

=== Resident in Accra, Ghana ===
- Australia
- Colombia
- Czech Republic
- Hungary
- Kuwait
- Namibia
- Sierra Leone

=== Resident in Bamako, Mali ===
- Guinea
- Mauritania
- Spain
- United Kingdom
- Venezuela

=== Resident in Dakar, Senegal ===
- Austria
- Cape Verde
- Gambia
- Malaysia
- North Korea
- Norway
- Romania
- Poland
- Portugal
- Thailand

=== Resident in Rabat, Morocco ===
- Croatia
- Eswatini
- Kazakhstan
- Madagascar
- Vietnam

=== Resident elsewhere ===
- Bangladesh (Tripoli)
- Oman (Algiers)
- Qatar (Cotonou)
- Pakistan (Tripoli)
- Seychelles (Addis Ababa)
- Sri Lanka (Nairobi)
- Ukraine (Tunis)
- United Arab Emirates (Algiers)

== Closed missions ==
Host city	Sending country	Mission	Year closed	Ref.
Ouagadougou	Denmark	Embassy	2024	
Ouagadougou	France	Embassy	2026	
Ouagadougou	Luxembourg	Embassy	2026	
Ouagadougou	South Korea	Embassy	1989	
Ouagadougou	Sudan	Embassy	2021	
Ouagadougou	Sweden	Embassy	2024	
Ouagadougou	Republic of China (Taiwan)	Embassy	2018	

== See also ==
- Apostolic Nunciature to Burkina Faso
