= 2020 Burkinabè general election =

- 22 November 2020
- Presidential election
- Registered: 5,918,844
- Turnout: 50.22% (▼9.78pp)
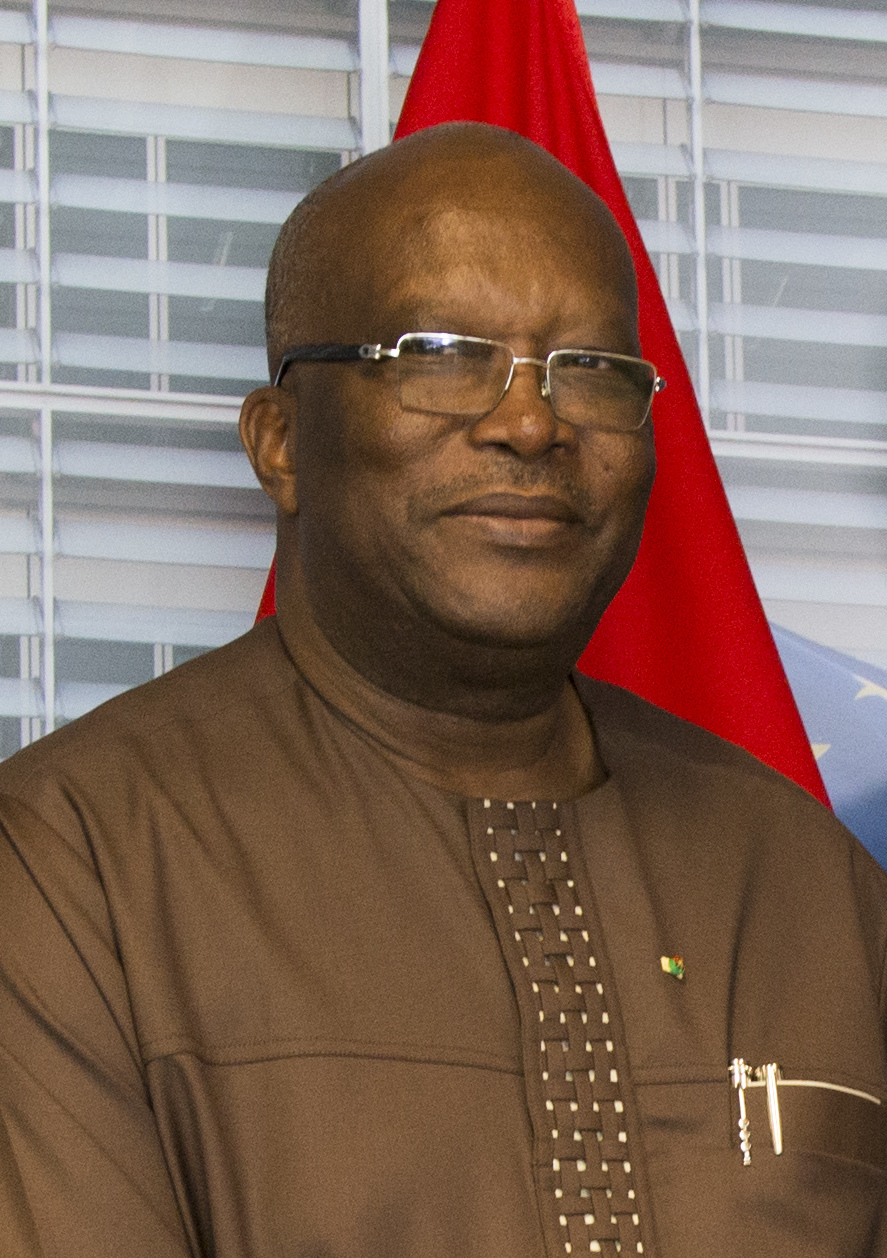

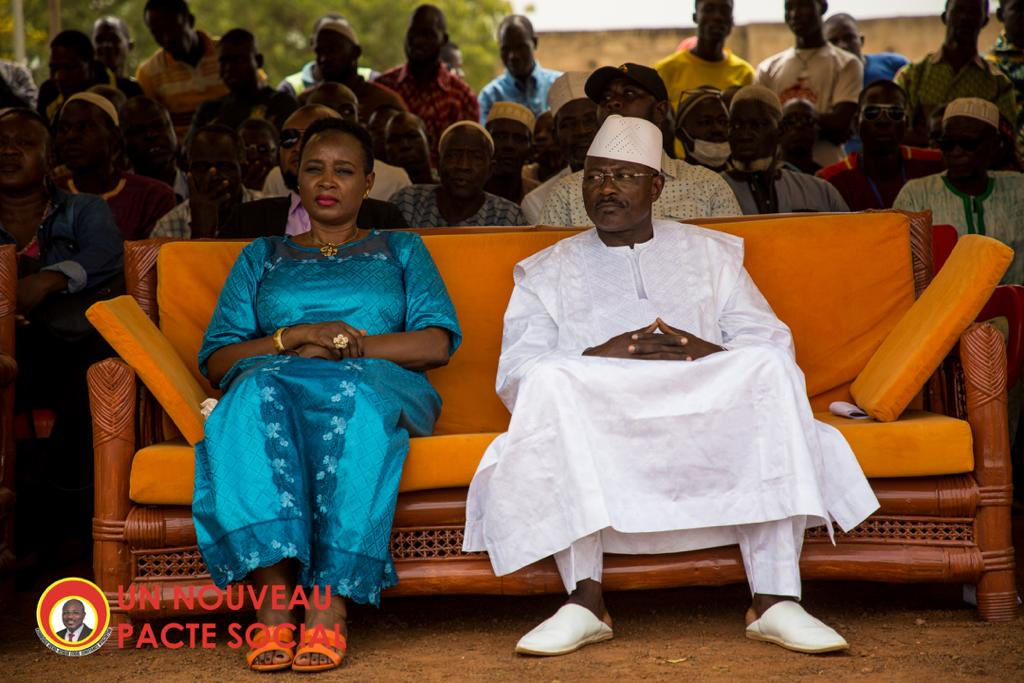

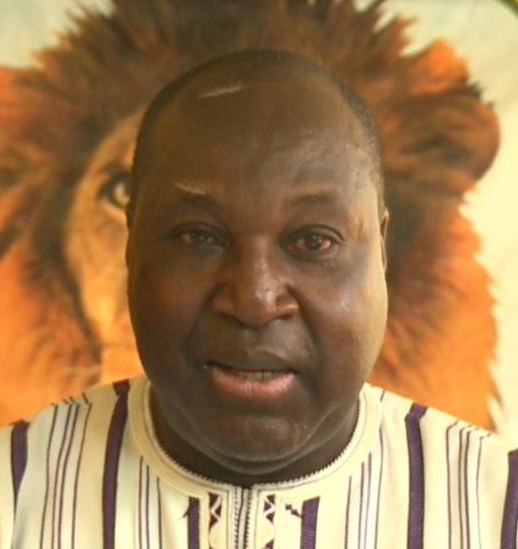
Nominee	Roch Marc Christian Kaboré	Eddie Komboïgo	Zéphirin Diabré
Party	MPP	CDP	UPC
Popular vote	1,645,229	442,693	354,988
Percentage	57.74%	15.54%	12.46%
- Results by province
President before election
Roch Marc Christian Kaboré
MPP
Elected President
Roch Marc Christian Kaboré
MPP
- Legislative election
- All 127 seats in the National Assembly; 64 seats needed for a majority
- Turnout: 49.66% (▼10.47pp)
Party	Leader	Vote %	Seats	+/–
MPP	Roch Kaboré	34.59	56	+1
CDP	Eddie Komboïgo	13.27	20	+2
UPC	Zéphirin Diabré	10.18	12	−21
NTD	Vincent Dabilgou	5.57	13	+10
ADF-RDA	Gilbert Noël Ouédraogo	2.47	3	0
UNIR/PS	Bénéwendé Sankara	2.45	5	0
RPI		2.40	3	New
PDC		2.01	3	+3
MBF		1.97	4	New
CNP		1.32	2	New
AGIR ENSEMBLE		1.29	2	New
APR-Tiligre		1.06	1	New
PUR		1.03	1	New
PDS/Metba	Hama Arba Diallo	0.99	1	0
CPS/G3		0.74	1	New
This lists parties that won seats. See the complete results below.
Results by province
Prime Minister before	Prime Minister after
Christophe Joseph Marie Dabiré; Independent	Christophe Joseph Marie Dabiré; Independent

General elections were held in Burkina Faso on 22 November 2020 to elect the President and National Assembly. In the presidential elections, incumbent president Roch Marc Christian Kaboré of the People's Movement for Progress was re-elected in the first round with 57.7% of the vote, avoiding the need for second round. The main campaign focus of the major presidential candidates was the growing insecurity in the country with the rise in terrorism and ethnic violence.

== Electoral system ==
The President is elected using the two-round system; if no candidate receives a majority of the vote in the first round, a second round will be held.

The 127 members of the National Assembly are elected by proportional representation; 111 are elected from 45 multi-member constituencies with between two and nine seats, with 16 elected from a single nationwide constituency.

== Campaign ==
In February 2019 former Prime Minister Kadré Désiré Ouédraogo announced that he would contest the presidential elections.

== Conduct ==
Due to instability, the election commission was unable to conduct voter registration in more than 17% of the country. Fifty-two out of 127 members of parliament suggested that they would not be able to campaign in their constituency due to security concerns. With increased pressure from the government not to postpone the elections, the National Assembly passed a bill on 24 August to introduce a force majeure clause. The clause allowed the elections to continue as normal and in areas where insecurity limited the vote from being held, the results from polling stations that were able to open dictated the result for the entire constituency. At the start of the campaign period, municipalities in six of the thirteen regions had cases of force majeure.

The COVID-19 pandemic also prevented voter registrations between 30 March and 25 May.

On election day, voting did not take place in 926 of the 19,836 polling stations, disenfranchising 596,756 registered voters.

== Results ==
=== President ===
Candidate	Party	Votes	%
Roch Marc Christian Kaboré	People's Movement for Progress	1,645,229	57.74
Eddie Komboïgo	Congress for Democracy and Progress	442,693	15.54
Zéphirin Diabré	Union for Progress and Reform	354,988	12.46
Kadré Désiré Ouédraogo	Act Together	95,661	3.36
Tahirou Barry	National Rebirth Party	62,231	2.18
Ablassé Ouedraogo	Alternative Faso	51,461	1.81
Gilbert Noël Ouédraogo	ADF–RDA	45,263	1.59
Yacouba Isaac Zida	Patriotic Movement for Salvation	43,537	1.53
Abdoulaye Soma	Sun of the Future Movement	40,724	1.43
Segui Ambroise Farama	Organisation of African Peoples – Burkina Faso	25,916	0.91
Kiemdoro do Pascalo Sessouma	Vision Burkina	20,068	0.70
Yéli Monique Kam	Movement for the Renaissance of Burkina	15,322	0.54
Claude Aimé Tassembedo	Independent	6,442	0.23
Total		2,849,535	100.00
Valid votes		2,849,535	95.86
Invalid/blank votes		123,055	4.14
Total votes		2,972,590	100.00
Registered voters/turnout		5,918,844	50.22
Source: Constitutional Court

=== National Assembly ===
Party	Votes	%	Seats			
Party	Votes	%	National	Regional	Total	+/–
People's Movement for Progress	968,980	34.59	6	50	56	+1
Congress for Democracy and Progress	371,633	13.27	2	18	20	+2
Union for Progress and Reform	285,202	10.18	2	10	12	–21
New Era for Democracy	155,995	5.57	1	12	13	+10
Alliance for Democracy and Federation – African Democratic Rally	69,179	2.47	1	2	3	0
Union for Rebirth / Sankarist Party	68,727	2.45	1	4	5	0
Patriotic Rally for Integrity	67,304	2.40	1	2	3	New
Party for Development and Change	56,407	2.01	1	2	3	+3
Movement for the Future Burkina Faso	55,136	1.97	1	3	4	New
New Alliance of Faso	48,499	1.73	0	0	0	–2
National Convention for Progress	37,042	1.32	0	2	2	New
Act Together	36,163	1.29	0	2	2	New
Pan-African Alliance for Refoundation	29,577	1.06	0	1	1	New
Progressives United for Renewal	28,894	1.03	0	1	1	New
Union for the Republic and Democracy	28,864	1.03	0	0	0	New
Party for Democracy and Socialism/Metba	27,757	0.99	0	1	1	0
SENS Movement	26,849	0.96	0	0	0	New
Patriotic Movement for Salvation	26,369	0.94	0	0	0	New
Organisation for Democracy and Labour	24,869	0.89	0	0	0	–1
Movement for Change and Renaissance	22,809	0.81	0	0	0	New
Alliance of Forces for Alternance	21,443	0.77	0	0	0	New
Convergence for Progress and Solidarity-Generation 3	20,639	0.74	0	1	1	New
Renewal	13,393	0.48	0	0	0	New
African Front for Change	11,905	0.42	0	0	0	New
Rally of Patriots for Renewal	11,833	0.42	0	0	0	0
Sun of the Future Movement	11,224	0.40	0	0	0	New
Democratic Party for Integration and Solidarity	10,714	0.38	0	0	0	New
Independent Associates	10,173	0.36	0	0	0	New
National Rebirth Party	9,395	0.34	0	0	0	–2
Labour Alliance for Development	9,308	0.33	0	0	0	New
Alliance of Democrats of Burkina	8,282	0.30	0	0	0	New
Burkina Yirwa	7,833	0.28	0	0	0	0
Movement of Young Patriots for Progress	7,141	0.25	0	0	0	New
Congress for Rebirth and Progress	6,873	0.25	0	0	0	New
Union for the Republic	6,385	0.23	0	0	0	0
Alternative Faso	6,370	0.23	0	0	0	–1
Coalition Rupture	6,307	0.23	0	0	0	New
Sidwaya	6,022	0.21	0	0	0	New
L'Autre Burkina/PSR	5,996	0.21	0	0	0	New
Patriotic Pan-African Alternative	5,906	0.21	0	0	0	New
Movement of the People for Democracy	5,686	0.20	0	0	0	0
Burkinabé Democratic Union for Renaissance	5,570	0.20	0	0	0	New
Organisation of African Peoples-Burkina Faso	5,426	0.19	0	0	0	New
Movement for Democracy in Africa	5,408	0.19	0	0	0	–1
Rally of Burkinans for Progress	5,357	0.19	0	0	0	New
Independent Party of Burkina	5,074	0.18	0	0	0	New
Faso Kanu	4,959	0.18	0	0	0	New
Fasokooz	4,856	0.17	0	0	0	New
Our Common Cause	4,843	0.17	0	0	0	New
Rally of People for Labour	4,617	0.16	0	0	0	New
Party for Democratic Renewal	4,184	0.15	0	0	0	New
Congress of African Nations/Burkina Faso	4,098	0.15	0	0	0	New
Rally for Burkina	3,973	0.14	0	0	0	New
Union of Centrist Forces	3,894	0.14	0	0	0	New
Movement for Progress and Reform	3,877	0.14	0	0	0	0
Patriotic Convergence for Renewal/Progressive Movement	3,645	0.13	0	0	0	0
Standing Citizens Movement	3,496	0.12	0	0	0	New
Rally of White Hands	3,422	0.12	0	0	0	New
Party of Republican People	3,315	0.12	0	0	0	New
Party of Justice and Development	2,959	0.11	0	0	0	New
National Union of Independents for Reform	2,911	0.10	0	0	0	0
Movement for the Renaissance of Burkina	2,748	0.10	0	0	0	New
Convergence of Patriots and Progressives	2,714	0.10	0	0	0	New
Party of Pan-African Patriots	2,694	0.10	0	0	0	0
Party for National Unity and Development	2,620	0.09	0	0	0	0
Party for National Cohesion	2,594	0.09	0	0	0	0
Party for Democracy and Youth	2,329	0.08	0	0	0	0
Alliance for Rebirth, Democracy and Integration	2,275	0.08	0	0	0	0
Workers of Peace and Development	2,271	0.08	0	0	0	New
Fasocrat Party	2,208	0.08	0	0	0	0
Movement of Intellectuals for Development	2,111	0.08	0	0	0	New
Alliance of Democrats for Development	2,092	0.07	0	0	0	New
Alliance of Generations for Renaissance	2,075	0.07	0	0	0	New
Movement for Democratic Renewal	1,985	0.07	0	0	0	New
Patriotic Front for Change	1,867	0.07	0	0	0	New
Union for Social Development	1,829	0.07	0	0	0	New
Vision Burkina	1,805	0.06	0	0	0	New
Coalition of Democratic Forces for Real Change	1,786	0.06	0	0	0	New
Burkina Socialist Party	1,606	0.06	0	0	0	New
Republican Party for Total Independence	1,584	0.06	0	0	0	0
Hope of Faso	1,577	0.06	0	0	0	New
Sun Alliance for Progress	1,570	0.06	0	0	0	New
Party for the Protection of the Environment/Nature Conservation	1,481	0.05	0	0	0	0
Ecologist Party for New Development	1,408	0.05	0	0	0	0
Movement for Patriotic Rally	1,282	0.05	0	0	0	New
Burkina Laafia Party	1,241	0.04	0	0	0	0
Together for Faso	1,178	0.04	0	0	0	New
Party for Labour and Democracy	1,163	0.04	0	0	0	New
National Union for Democracy and Progress	1,123	0.04	0	0	0	0
Democratic Organisation for the Defence of Nature	1,102	0.04	0	0	0	New
Party of Democrats of Faso	1,092	0.04	0	0	0	New
New Vision	1,079	0.04	0	0	0	–
Coalition for the Republic–Progressive Party	1,073	0.04	0	0	0	0
Patriotic Movement for Alternance	1,055	0.04	0	0	0	New
Movement for Reconciliation and the Renewal of Faso	1,031	0.04	0	0	0	New
Burkina United for Triumph	977	0.03	0	0	0	New
National Union of Independents	969	0.03	0	0	0	New
Patriotic Party of Young Republicans	941	0.03	0	0	0	New
Party for the Rebirth of Democracy in Faso	939	0.03	0	0	0	0
Party of Rally for Democratic Integrity and Solidarity	936	0.03	0	0	0	New
Mouvement le Ril vaa-ir	852	0.03	0	0	0	New
Conscious Youth of Burkina	830	0.03	0	0	0	0
Greatcall	818	0.03	0	0	0	New
Alliance for the Republic and Democracy	750	0.03	0	0	0	0
Integrated Youth Committed to Change	732	0.03	0	0	0	New
African Movement of the Peoples	729	0.03	0	0	0	0
Common Front for Development	692	0.02	0	0	0	New
Pan-African Movement of United Forces for Work, Union and Renaissance	664	0.02	0	0	0	New
Fasokamba	633	0.02	0	0	0	New
New Democratic Initiative–Peoples Action Party	606	0.02	0	0	0	0
Centrist Party for Democracy and Progress	546	0.02	0	0	0	0
Alliance for Peace and Integrity	542	0.02	0	0	0	New
Burkina United for Development	507	0.02	0	0	0	New
Movement for the Defence of Democracy	499	0.02	0	0	0	New
Party of African Grouping	454	0.02	0	0	0	New
Pan-African Movement of Faso	381	0.01	0	0	0	0
La Nature	286	0.01	0	0	0	New
Party of People for Progress in Faso	250	0.01	0	0	0	New
Party of Progress for National Renewal	237	0.01	0	0	0	New
Party for Development and Democracy	192	0.01	0	0	0	New
Burkina on the Road to Development	187	0.01	0	0	0	New
Movement of Young Republicans	168	0.01	0	0	0	–
National Party for Development and Peace	124	0.00	0	0	0	0
Union for Democracy and Development	119	0.00	0	0	0	New
Les Tondikara de la Paix	64	0.00	0	0	0	New
March for the Fatherland	33	0.00	0	0	0	New
Total	2,801,272	100.00	16	111	127	0
Valid votes	2,801,272	95.68				
Invalid/blank votes	126,487	4.32				
Total votes	2,927,759	100.00				
Registered voters/turnout	5,895,773	49.66				
Source: Constitutional Court

== Aftermath ==
Although the opposition accused the government of committing electoral fraud before and after the election, on 27 November opposition leader Zephirin Diabre conceded defeat and met with Kabore to congratulate him on his re-election. The opposition failed to produce substantial evidence of electoral fraud and the election commission quickly dismissed the claims of irregularities. Observers considered the election fair. In the country's east, there was a minor incident as 30 people voted using fake ballot papers as there were not any "original" ballot papers available. However, Halidou Ouedraogo, President of local election monitoring organization CODEL said that it was not a widespread phenomenon and gave the election a mostly clean bill.

President Kaboré would end up not finishing his new term, as he was deposed in a coup in 2022.
