= Change 2005 =

- Founded: December 2004
- Ideology: Big tent Factions; Communism; Socialism; Democratic socialism Social democracy Green politics Sankarism; Progressivism; Ecologism
- Political position: Centre-left to far-left

Change 2005 (French: Alternance 2005) was a political alliance in Burkina Faso (the former Upper Volta), founded to contest the presidential election in 2005. The incumbent, Blaise Compaore, was standing for a third term and was expected to win despite claims that another term in office would be unconstitutional. He was re-elected with 80.35% of the votes.

Alternance 2005 was founded in December 2004 by 16 leftist parties. The grouping had put forward three candidates for the first round of the election: Hermann Yaméogo, president of Union nationale pour la démocratie et le développement (UNDD - National Union for Democracy and Development), Benewendé Stanislas Sankara of Union pour la renaissance/Mouvement sankariste (UNIR/MS - Union for Rebirth/Sankarist Movement) and Philippe Ouédraogo of the Parti africain de l'indépendance (PAI). However, Ouédraogo, later stood as a candidate for his own party, Rassemblement des écologistes du Burkina (RDEB - Rally of the Ecologists of Burkina) which announced its "retirement" from Alternance 2005 and supported its own candidate.

Sankara, an MP, was one of the most prominent opposition figures in the election though few expected him to make an impression. He received 4.88% of the vote.

The parties forming the alliance were:

- African Independence Party
- Citizens’ League of Builders
- Convergence for Social Democracy
- Group of Patriotic Democrats
- Movement for Democracy and Rebirth
- National Union for Democracy and Development
- Party for Democracy and Progress / Socialist Party
- Party for Democracy and Socialism
- Party of the Independent Forces for Development
- Patriotic Front for Change
- Rally of the Ecologists of Burkina
- Sankarist Democratic Front
- Social Forces Front
- Socialist Peasants Party
- Union for Rebirth/Sankarist Movement
- Union of Independent Democrats and Progressives
