= 2002 Burkinabé parliamentary election =

- 5 May 2002
- All 111 seats in the National Assembly; 56 seats needed for a majority
- Turnout: 70.45% (▲26.38 pp)
Party	Leader	Vote %	Seats	+/–
CDP	Blaise Compaoré	49.49	73	+16
ADF-RDA	Gilbert Noël Ouédraogo	12.60	17	0
PDP/PS	Ali Lankoandé	7.01	10	New
CFD	–	4.38	5	New
PAI	Soumane Touré	3.62	5	+2
PAREN	Tahirou Barry	2.73	4	+2
CPS	Ernest Nongma Ouédraogo	2.63	3	−7
UNIR/PS	Bénéwendé Stanislas Sankara	2.45	3	New
PDS	Philippe Ouédraogo	2.41	2	+2
CNDP	–	2.02	2	−2
UDPI	–	1.04	1	+1
FPC	–	0.97	1	+1
APL	–	0.67	1	−4
This lists parties that won seats. See the complete results below.
Results by constituency
Prime Minister before	Prime Minister after
Paramanga Ernest Yonli; CDP	Paramanga Ernest Yonli; CDP

Parliamentary elections were held in Burkina Faso on 5 May 2002. The result was a victory for the ruling Congress for Democracy and Progress (CDP), which won 57 of the 111 seats in the National Assembly.

According to the Journal of Democracy, "The elections were acknowledged by the opposition and international observers to be much freer and fairer than in the past."

== Electoral system ==
Following electoral reforms introduced since the 1997 elections, the 111 members of the National Assembly were elected in two sections: 90 seats were elected using regional lists in 13 constituencies, whilst the remaining 21 were elected on a national list.

== Campaign ==
A total of 3,540 candidates registered to contest the elections, with 30 political parties participating.

== Results ==
Party	Votes	%	Seats		
Party	Votes	%	National	Regional	Total
Congress for Democracy and Progress	862,119	49.49	11	46	57
Alliance for Democracy and Federation – African Democratic Rally	219,543	12.60	3	14	17
Party for Democracy and Progress / Socialist Party	122,100	7.01	2	8	10
Coalition of Democratic Forces	76,333	4.38	1	4	5
African Independence Party	63,031	3.62	1	4	5
National Rebirth Party	47,477	2.73	1	3	4
Sankarist Pan-African Convention	45,745	2.63	1	2	3
Union for Rebirth / Sankarist Party	42,599	2.45	1	2	3
Party for Democracy and Socialism	42,039	2.41	0	2	2
National Convention of Progressive Democrats	35,107	2.02	0	2	2
FFS	33,917	1.95	0	0	0
UNDP	20,313	1.17	0	0	0
CAD	18,900	1.08	0	0	0
PNP	18,192	1.04	0	0	0
Union of Democrats and Independent Progressives	18,053	1.04	0	1	1
Patriotic Front for Change	16,852	0.97	0	1	1
Alliance for Progress and Freedom	11,631	0.67	0	1	1
PPDS	11,438	0.66	0	0	0
RDP	9,185	0.53	0	0	0
GDP	5,528	0.32	0	0	0
RPP/G	5,321	0.31	0	0	0
PSU	3,685	0.21	0	0	0
PNR/JV	3,144	0.18	0	0	0
UDD	3,017	0.17	0	0	0
UPD/PT	2,767	0.16	0	0	0
RDR	2,664	0.15	0	0	0
PFID	440	0.03	0	0	0
MDR	394	0.02	0	0	0
PBR	315	0.02	0	0	0
PDN	187	0.01	0	0	0
Total	1,742,036	100.00	21	90	111
Valid votes	1,741,037	92.45			
Invalid/blank votes	142,243	7.55			
Total votes	1,883,280	100.00			
Registered voters/turnout	2,935,285	64.16			
Source: CENI

== Aftermath ==
Following the elections, Roch Marc Christian Kaboré of the CDP was elected President of the National Assembly, defeating Marlène Zebango of the Alliance for Democracy and Federation – African Democratic Rally by a vote of 77–22.
