= 2010 Burkinabé presidential election =

Third re-election of Blaise Compaoré

- 21 November 2010
- Registered: 3,239,777
- Turnout: 54.90%
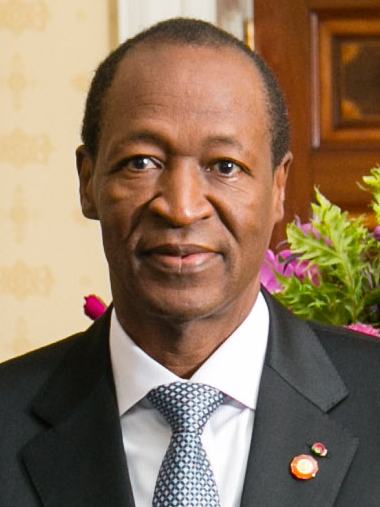

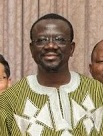
Nominee	Blaise Compaoré	Hama Arba Diallo	Bénéwendé Stanislas Sankara
Party	CDP	PDS	UNIR/PS
Popular vote	1,358,941	138,666	107,377
Percentage	80.21%	8.18%	6.34%
Acting President before election
Blaise Compaoré
Elected President
Blaise Compaoré
CDP

Presidential elections were held in Burkina Faso on 21 November 2010. Incumbent president Blaise Compaoré was re-elected with 80% of the vote. The elections were marred by claims of widespread fraud.

== Candidates ==
A total of seven candidates registered to contest the elections, including three who contested the 2005 elections. Incumbent President Blaise Compaoré ran as the candidate of the Congress for Democracy and Progress, and was also supported by the Alliance for Democracy and Federation – African Democratic Rally. Bénéwendé Stanislas Sankara, the runner-up in 2005 was the candidate of the Union for Rebirth / Sankarist Movement. Pargui Emile Pare, who finished tenth in 2005, ran as the People's Movement for Socialism / Federal Party candidate.

Former Army commander Boukary Kaboré was the Pan-African Sankarist Union / Progressive Movement candidate, and was backed by the National Council for Renaissance-Sankarist Movement and the Party for National Unity and Development. Former Foreign Minister Hama Arba Diallo was nominated by the Party for Democracy and Socialism, and also received the support of the African Independence Party, the Social Forces Front, Faso Metba, the Citizens League of Builders, the Union for Democracy and Social Progress and the Union of Progressive Forces.

Hydrogeologist Ouampoussoga Francois Kaboré ran as the Party for Democracy and Progress / Socialist Party candidate, whilst Maxime Kaboré stood as an independent.

== Results ==
Candidate	Party	Votes	%
Blaise Compaoré	Congress for Democracy and Progress	1,358,941	80.21
Hama Arba Diallo	Party for Democracy and Socialism	138,666	8.18
Bénéwendé Stanislas Sankara	Union for Rebirth / Sankarist Party	107,377	6.34
Boukary Kaboré	Sankarist Union / Pan-African Movement of Faso	39,029	2.30
Maxime Kaboré	Independent Party of Burkina	24,888	1.47
Pargui Emile Paré	People's Movement for Socialism / Federal Party	14,461	0.85
François Kaboré	Party for Democracy and Progress / Socialist Party	10,909	0.64
Total		1,694,271	100.00
Valid votes		1,694,271	95.25
Invalid/blank votes		84,422	4.75
Total votes		1,778,693	100.00
Registered voters/turnout		3,239,777	54.90
Source: Psephos
