= 2007 Burkinabé parliamentary election =

- 6 May 2007
- All 111 seats in the National Assembly; 56 seats needed for a majority
- Turnout: 56.43% (▼14.02 pp)
Party	Leader	Vote %	Seats	+/–
CDP	Blaise Compaoré	58.85	73	+16
ADF-RDA	Gilbert Noël Ouédraogo	10.71	14	−3
UPR	Toussaint Abel Coulibaly	4.30	5	New
UNIR/PS	Bénéwendé Stanislas Sankara	3.89	4	+1
CFD	–	2.34	3	−2
PDS	Philippe Ouédraogo	3.28	2	0
PDP/PS	Ali Lankoandé	2.51	2	−8
RDB	Celestin Saidou Compaoré	2.09	2	New
UPS	–	1.74	2	+2
PAREN	Laurent Bado	1.29	1	−3
RPC	–	1.15	1	+1
UDPS	–	1.03	1	+1
PAI	–	0.83	1	−4
This lists parties that won seats. See the complete results below.
Results by constituency
Prime Minister before	Prime Minister after
Paramanga Ernest Yonli; CDP	Tertius Zongo; CDP

Parliamentary elections were held in Burkina Faso on 6 May 2007. The result was a victory for the ruling Congress for Democracy and Progress (CDP), which won 73 of the 111 seats in the National Assembly.

== Results ==
Party	Votes	%	Seats			
Party	Votes	%	National	Regional	Total	+/–
Congress for Democracy and Progress	1,373,078	58.85	9	64	73	+16
Alliance for Democracy and Federation – African Democratic Rally	249,766	10.71	2	12	14	–3
Union for the Republic	100,392	4.30	1	4	5	+5
Union for Rebirth / Sankarist Party	90,705	3.89	1	3	4	+1
Party for Democracy and Socialism	76,525	3.28	1	1	2	0
Party for Democracy and Progress / Socialist Party	58,455	2.51	0	2	2	–8
Convention of Democratic Forces	54,621	2.34	1	2	3	+3
Rally for the Development of Burkina	48,865	2.09	0	2	2	+2
National Union for Democracy and Development	44,113	1.89	0	0	0	–
Union of Sankarist Parties	40,608	1.74	0	2	2	+2
National Rebirth Party	30,030	1.29	0	1	1	–3
Citizen's Popular Rally	26,758	1.15	0	1	1	+1
Union for Democracy and Social Progress	23,918	1.03	0	1	1	+1
African Independence Party	19,267	0.83	0	1	1	–4
Movement for the People and Socialism/Federal Party	16,734	0.72	0	0	0	–
Rally of the Ecologists of Burkina	11,481	0.49	0	0	0	–
Republican Party for Integration and Solidarity	10,324	0.44	0	0	0	–
Alliance for Progress and Freedom	5,466	0.23	0	0	0	–1
ACP	5,363	0.23	0	0	0	–
Party for Concord and Progress of Faso	5,192	0.22	0	0	0	–
Organisation for Democracy and Labour	4,384	0.19	0	0	0	–
National Union for Independence and Solidarity	3,486	0.15	0	0	0	–
Ecologist Party for the Development of Burkina	3,150	0.14	0	0	0	–
Patriotic Front for Change	3,084	0.13	0	0	0	–1
Social Union of Burkina	3,016	0.13	0	0	0	–
Alliance for Democracy of Faso	2,630	0.11	0	0	0	–
Republican Democratic Front	2,609	0.11	0	0	0	–
Alliance of Revolutionary Democrats	2,412	0.10	0	0	0	–
Group of Patriotic Democrats	2,298	0.10	0	0	0	–
Union of Patriots for Development	2,075	0.09	0	0	0	–
National Convention for Change	1,470	0.06	0	0	0	–
Democratic Union of Faso	1,363	0.06	0	0	0	–
Greens of Faso	1,318	0.06	0	0	0	–
Citizens League of Builders	1,163	0.05	0	0	0	–
National Council for Renaissance-Sankarist Movement	1,105	0.05	0	0	0	–
Party of Independent Forces for Development	930	0.04	0	0	0	–
Movement for Tolerance and Progress	923	0.04	0	0	0	–
Party for the Protection of the Environment/Nature Convention	855	0.04	0	0	0	–
Union of Progressive Forces	620	0.03	0	0	0	–
Burkinabé Liberal Party	428	0.02	0	0	0	–
Union of Democratic Peasants for Progress	387	0.02	0	0	0	–
Unified Socialist Party	372	0.02	0	0	0	–
Party of Progress for National Renewal	371	0.02	0	0	0	–
Cultural Activity Movement for Political Ennoblement	327	0.01	0	0	0	–
National Union for Democracy and Progress	310	0.01	0	0	0	–
Pan-African Movement of Faso	219	0.01	0	0	0	–
New Social Democracy	197	0.01	0	0	0	–
Total	2,333,163	100.00	15	96	111	0
Valid votes	2,333,163	92.57				
Invalid/blank votes	187,260	7.43				
Total votes	2,520,423	100.00				
Registered voters/turnout	4,466,354	56.43				
Source: CENI, CENI
