= List of presidents of the National Assembly of Burkina Faso =

Presidents of Burkina Faso legislatures.

Below is a list of presidents of Conseil-General:

Name	Entered office	Left office
Georges Konseiga	1948	1948
Christophe Kalenzaga	1949	1949
Pierre Bernard	1950	1950
Guillaume Ouedraogo	1950	1951
Tibo B. Ouedraogo	1951	1952

Below is a list of presidents of the Territorial Assembly:

Name	Entered office	Left office
Joseph Ouedraogo	1952	1954
Mathias Sorgho	1954	1957
Yalgado Ouedraogo	April 1957	July 1957
Nazi Boni	December 1957	February 1958
Laurent Bandaogo	1958	1958

Below is a list of presidents of the Constituent Assembly:

Name	Entered office	Left office
Begnon-Damien Kone	1958	1960

Below is a list of presidents of the National Assembly of Upper Volta and Burkina Faso:

	Name	Entered office	Left office
First Republic (1960–1966)	Begnon-Damien Kone	1960	January 3, 1966
Second Republic (1970–1977)	Joseph Ouedraogo	1970	February 8, 1974
Third Republic (1977–1980)	Gérard Kango Ouedraogo	9 June 1978	November 25, 1980
Fourth Republic (1991–2014)	Bongnessan Arsène Ye	June 17, 1992	June 17, 1997
	Mélégué Maurice Traoré	June 17, 1997	June 14, 2002
	Roch Marc Christian Kaboré	June 14, 2002	December 28, 2012
	Soungalo Ouattara	December 28, 2012	October 30, 2014
	vacant	October 30, 2014	November 27, 2014
National Transitional Council (2014–2015)	Chérif Sy	November 27, 2014	December 30, 2015
Semi-presidential republic (2015–2022)	Salif Diallo	December 30, 2015	August 19, 2017 (Died in office)
	Bénéwendé Stanislas Sankara (Acting)	August 19, 2017	September 8, 2017
	Alassane Bala Sakandé	September 8, 2017	24 January 2022 (deposed)
Legislative Assembly (2022–present)	Aboubacar Toguyeni	22 March 2022	11 November 2022
	Ousmane Bougouma	11 November 2022	Incumbent

== Notes ==
Lt.-Gen. Windpanga Samandoulougou was Chairman of a Consultative Committee of 41 members after the military coup in 1966.

== See also ==
- National Assembly of Burkina Faso
- Chamber of Representatives of Burkina Faso
