= Mélégué Maurice Traoré =

Burkinabé politician

Mélégué Maurice Traoré (born 31 December 1951) is a Burkinabé politician who was Minister of Secondary and Higher Education in the government of Burkina Faso from 1992 to 1997 and President of the National Assembly of Burkina Faso from 1997 to 2002.

== Biography ==
Traoré was born in Kankalaba. He served as Secretary-General of the Ministry of Foreign Affairs, as Chargé d'affaires at the Burkinabé Embassy to the United States, and as Ambassador to Russia before being appointed as Minister of Secondary and Higher Education and Scientific Research in 1992. Five years later, following the May 1997 parliamentary election, he was elected as President of the National Assembly on 7 June 1997, holding that post until the end of the parliamentary term in 2002.

Traoré was re-elected to the National Assembly in the May 2002 parliamentary election as a candidate of the ruling Congress for Democracy and Progress (CDP) in Cascades Region, but Roch Marc Christian Kaboré was elected to succeed him as President of the National Assembly on 6 June 2002. Traoré continued to sit in the National Assembly as an ordinary deputy. According to Traoré, he stayed busy despite a reduced volume of work, and he stood as a candidate again in the 2007 parliamentary election despite widespread speculation that he would not. He also denied rumors that his relationship with President Blaise Compaoré had suffered, saying that he met with Compaoré less frequently only because he held less responsibility as an ordinary deputy than he did as President of the National Assembly. In the May 2007 parliamentary election, he was again elected to the National Assembly as the CDP's candidate in Leraba Province.

Traoré was the Regional Political Commissioner of the CDP in Cascades Region for some years and subsequently served in a lesser role as the CDP's regional Commissioner for Legal Affairs. Beginning in 1991, he led the ruling party's campaigns in Cascades Region. In the campaign for the November 2005 presidential election, Traoré was initially the deputy of the CDP's campaign director for Cascades Region, Alain Ludovic Tou, but after Tou was involved in an accident Traoré took over as the regional campaign director. Traoré predicted a first round victory for President Compaoré.

Traoré has also served as Commissioner-General and President of the Burkinabé Federation of Scouting.
