= Abdoulkader Cissé =

Burkinabé politician

Abdoulaye Abdoulkader Cissé (born 5 August 1955) is a Burkinabé politician who served in the government of Burkina Faso as Minister of Mines, Quarries, and Energy from 2000 to 2011.

== Life and career ==
Cissé was born in Dori, located in Séno Province, and he studied in Ouagadougou, then in the Soviet Union at the National Economic Institute of Kiev. In 1991 he was awarded a Joint Japan / World Bank Scholarship to study at the University of Social Sciences of Toulouse in France. Beginning in 1983, he held a variety of official posts in Burkina Faso over the following eight years: he was Adviser on Economic Affairs at the Ministry of Planning and the Cooperation, Chargé de mission of the Minister-Delegate to the Presidency of Burkina Faso, President of the Economic and Social Council, Adviser to the Presidency for Economic Issues, and Director of Studies, Programming, and Follow-up for Investments at the Ministry of the Economy, Finance, and Planning. He was then a researcher on industrial economy and the privatization policies financed by the World Bank from October 1991 to February 1995. Later, he was President of the Chamber of Representatives, the upper house of Parliament, from December 1995 to January 1999.

Cissé was appointed to the government as Minister-Delegate to the Minister of Economy and Finance, in charge of Economic Development, on 14 January 1999. He was then promoted to the position of Minister of Trade, Industry, and Crafts on 12 October 1999; a year later, on 12 November 2000, he was moved to the position of Minister of Mines, Quarries, and Energy. In the May 2007 parliamentary election, he was elected to the National Assembly as a candidate of the Congress for Democracy and Progress (CDP) in Seno Province. He was retained in his ministerial post in the government appointed after the election on 10 June.

Although he led the CDP to a poor showing in Sahel Region in the 2006 local elections, he was subsequently retained as the CDP's Secretary for Development and Political Commissioner for Sahel Region at the party's Third Ordinary Congress in November 2006.
