= Gilbert Noël Ouédraogo =

Burkinabé politician

President of the ADF-RDA
- In office 29 June 2003 – 29 January 2026

Minister of Transport
- In office 6 January 2006 – 2013

Minister of Social Action and National Solidarity
- In office 12 November 2000 – 10 June 2002

Fourth Vice-President of the National Assembly of Burkina Faso
- In office 2013–2014

Personal details
- Born: December 25, 1968 (age 57) Ouagadougou, Burkina Faso
- Party: Alliance for Democracy and Federation–African Democratic Rally (ADF-RDA)
- Parent: Gérard Kango Ouédraogo (father)
- Occupation: Politician, lawyer

Gilbert Noël Ouédraogo (born 25 December 1968) is a Burkinabé politician who served as President of the Alliance for Democracy and Federation–African Democratic Rally (ADF-RDA), a political party in Burkina Faso, from 2003 until its dissolution in 2026. He served in the government of Burkina Faso as Minister of Social Action and National Solidarity from 2000 to 2002 and as Minister of Transport from 2006 to 2013. He was the Fourth Vice-President of the National Assembly of Burkina Faso from 2013 to 2014.

== Life and career ==
Ouédraogo, whose father was Gérard Kango Ouedraogo, was born in Ouagadougou and is a lawyer by profession. After standing unsuccessfully in the May 1992 parliamentary election as the seventh substitute candidate on the candidate list in Houet Province, he became the ADF-RDA's Secretary of Youth in 1994 and then its Secretary of External Relations in 1998. He was appointed to the government as Minister of Social Action and National Solidarity on 12 November 2000. In the May 2002 parliamentary election, he was elected to the National Assembly as an ADF-RDA candidate in Nord Region; he was not retained in his ministerial post in the government appointed on 10 June 2002, but was elected as the Third Vice-President of the National Assembly. He was re-elected to that post in June 2003 and June 2004.

Ouédraogo was elected as President of the ADF-RDA at the party's 28–29 June 2003 extraordinary congress, and as the head of the largest opposition party he received the title of Leader of the Opposition. In March 2004, he was elected by the National Assembly as one of Burkina Faso's members of the Pan-African Parliament. In the Pan-African Parliament, he became General Rapporteur of the ad hoc Judicial Affairs Commission, and in October 2004 he was elected as Vice-President of the West African Regional Group in the Pan-African Parliament. Despite being an opposition party, the ADF-RDA supported President Blaise Compaoré's candidacy in the November 2005 presidential election; after the election, Compaoré appointed Ouédraogo as Minister of Transport on 6 January 2006.

In the May 2007 parliamentary election, Ouédraogo was again elected to the National Assembly as a candidate on the ADF-RDA's national list, but he remained a member of the government after the election.

In the December 2012 parliamentary election, he was again elected to the National Assembly. Following the election, the ADF-RDA was not included in the government that was formed on 2 January 2013. Later in the same month, he was elected as Fourth Vice-President of the National Assembly.

Ouédraogo and the ADF-RDA supported the proposed constitutional amendment in 2014 that would have lifted term limits and allowed Compaoré to run for President again. The controversy over the amendment resulted in violent protests and the forced resignation of Compaoré on 31 October 2014. In August 2015, Ouédraogo was designated as the ADF-RDA's candidate for the October 2015 presidential election. However, he was barred from running by the Constitutional Council on 29 August 2015, along with the leader of the Congress for Democracy and Progress, Eddie Komboïgo, for supporting the removal of term limits. For the same reason, he was also barred from standing as a parliamentary candidate.

== See also ==
- List of members of the Pan-African Parliament
