= CNDP =

CNDP may refer to:

- National Congress for the Defence of the People, a political armed militia in the Democratic Republic of the Congo
- National Convention of Progressive Democrats, a political party in Burkina Faso
- Centre national de documentation pédagogique, the former name of the publisher of the Ministry of National Education of France, known as Réseau Canopé since 2014
- Châteauneuf-du-Pape AOC, a French wine appellation in the Rhône wine region in southeastern France, and the wine produced therein
