= Union for Democracy and Social Progress (disambiguation) =

The Union for Democracy and Social Progress is a major political party in the Democratic Republic of the Congo. It may also refer to the:

- Union for Democracy and Social Progress (Burkina Faso)
- Union for Democracy and Social Progress (Niger)
- Union for Democracy and Social Progress (Togo)

== See also ==
- Rally for Democracy and Social Progress
