= UBN =

UBN may refer to:

- Chinggis Khaan International Airport, near Ulaanbaatar, Mongolia
- Unbinilium, hypothetical chemical element with symbol Ubn
- Union Bank of Nigeria, a commercial bank headquartered in Lagos, Nigeria
- Union for a New Burkina, a political party in Burkina Faso
- Unique Business News, a news channel in Taiwan
- United Blood Nation, an American prison gang
- United Biscuits Network, a radio network for United Biscuits
