= Patriotic League for Development =

Patriotic League for Development (French: Ligue patriotique pour le développement, LIPAD) was an open mass front of the African Independence Party (PAI) in Burkina Faso. LIPAD was founded in September 1973 and was led by Hama Arba Diallo. The militants of LIPAD were generally called lipadistes.

LIPAD had its main influence in the trade union movement. The general secretary of the Voltaic Trade Union Confederation (CSV), Soumane Touré, was also the head of the LIPAD section in Ouagadougou.

LIPAD opted for 'Popular Revolution of National Liberation' (RPLN). Initially LIPAD offered vital support to the revolution of Thomas Sankara. In May 1983 pro-LIPAD students conducted massive demonstrations demanding his release. But when Sankara opted for the 'Popular and Democratic Revolution' promoted by ULC, LIPAD withdrew its support.

From August 3, 1983, to August 1984 LIPAD held five ministerial posts. Arba Diallo was Minister of Foreign Affairs, Philippe Ouédraogo Minister of Equipment and Telecommunications and Adama Touré Minister of Information. After the break in 1984 (generally called la clarification) Diallo and Touré were jailed. Diallo was released in 1985 and Touré in 1986. But even after la clarification lipadistes continued to hold some important positions. Michael Tapsoba was appointed Minister for Water in the new government. Ouédraogo was appointed chief engineer of mining.
