= Philippe Ouédraogo =

Philippe Ouédraogo may refer to:

- Philippe Ouédraogo (cardinal) (born 1945), cardinal from Burkina Faso
- Philippe Ouédraogo (politician) (born 1942), politician from Burkina Faso
