= 2005 Burkinabé presidential election =

Second re-election of Blaise Compaoré

- 13 November 2005
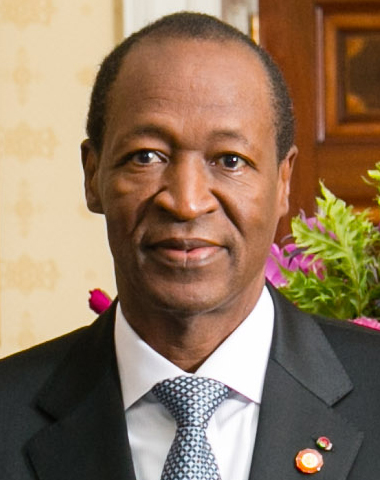

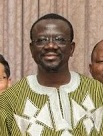
Nominee	Blaise Compaoré	Bénéwendé Stanislas Sankara
Party	CDP	UNIR/PS
Popular vote	1,674,966	103,216
Percentage	80.30%	4.95%
- Results by region Compaoré: 70-80% 80-90% >90%
President before election
Blaise Compaoré
CDP
Elected President
Blaise Compaoré
CDP

Presidential elections were held in Burkina Faso on 13 November 2005. Incumbent president Blaise Compaoré was re-elected with around 80% of the vote.

== Background ==
Compaoré has been in power since October 1987, was first elected in 1991, and was re-elected in 1998. In August 2005 he announced his intention to run for a third term as president. Opposition politicians argued that Compaoré could not run in the election because a constitutional amendment passed in 2000 limited a president to two terms. The amendment also reduced the term length from seven to five years. Compaoré's supporters, however, argued that the amendment could not be applied retroactively.

In October 2005, the Constitutional Council ruled that because Compaoré was president in 2000, the amendment would not apply until the end of his current term, thereby allowing his candidacy in the 2005 election.

== Campaign ==
The most contentious political issues facing the nation's government were freedom of press, economic viability, and tension with neighboring Ivory Coast caused by alleged Burkinabé support for Ivorian insurgents and the migration of workers to the Ivory Coast and Ghana.

Compaoré's campaign manager Salif Diallo expressed confidence in his candidate: "Our objective is not the victory of our candidate in the first round - that's already a sure thing, given the mobilisation of our supporters and the popularity of our candidate. Our goal is rather that the turnout and the lead be high."

On 27 and 28 October 18 labour unions called a two-day strike for higher salaries and pensions, and lower taxes on basic necessities. While in Gaskinde, Bénéwendé Stanislas Sankara stated "The labour union strikes demonstrate that the citizens have had enough of this government."

Several parties did not nominate their own candidates, but supported those of other parties; the Alliance for Democracy and Federation – African Democratic Rally and the Rally of Democrats for Faso supported Compaoré, the Sankarist Democratic Front supported Sankara, the Convergence for Social Democracy and the Union of Progressive Forces supported Philippe Ouédraogo, and Convergence of Hope backed Norbert Tiendrébéogo.

Hermann Yaméogo of the National Union for the Defence of Democracy withdrew his candidacy in October, but due to the lateness of his withdrawal, he remained on the ballot paper. Prior to his withdrawal, he had been supported by the Citizens League of Builders, the Group of Patriotic Democrats, the Movement for Democracy and Rebirth, the National Convention of Progressive Democrats, the National Republican Party-Right Path, the Party of Independent Forces for Development, the Patriotic Front for Change, the Union of Democrats and Independent Progressives and the Union of Forces for Renewal.

== Opinion polls ==
Polling firm	Date	Compaoré	Sankara	Others
Centre for Democratic Governance	August 2005	61.2	5.0	33.8
Centre for Democratic Governance	October 2005	69.0	3.7	27.3

== Results ==
Candidate	Party	Votes	%
Blaise Compaoré	Congress for Democracy and Progress	1,674,966	80.30
Bénéwendé Stanislas Sankara	Union for Rebirth / Sankarist Party	103,216	4.95
Laurent Bado	National Rebirth Party	54,550	2.62
Philippe Ouédraogo	Party for Democracy and Socialism	47,505	2.28
Ram Ouédraogo	Rally of the Ecologists of Burkina	42,450	2.04
Ali Lankoandé	Party for Democracy and Progress / Socialist Party	36,346	1.74
Norbert Tiendrébéogo	Social Forces Front	33,455	1.60
Soumane Touré	African Independence Party (Touré)	23,433	1.12
Gilbert Bouda	Burkinabé Party for Refoundation	21,735	1.04
Pargui Emile Paré	Socialist Alliance	18,165	0.87
Hermann Yaméogo	National Union for the Defence of Democracy	15,753	0.76
Toubé Clément Dakio	Union for Democracy and Development	7,802	0.37
Nayabtigungu Congo Kaboré	Movement for Tolerance and Progress	6,494	0.31
Total		2,085,870	100.00
Valid votes		2,085,870	91.16
Invalid/blank votes		202,387	8.84
Total votes		2,288,257	100.00
Registered voters/turnout		3,918,103	58.40
Source: CENI

== Aftermath ==
Following Compaoré's victory, he was sworn in for another term on 20 December 2005 in Ouagadougou.
