= Laurent Bado =

Burkinabé politician

Personal details
- Party: National Rebirth Party

Laurent Bado is a Burkinabé politician and member of the National Rebirth Party (PAREN).

== Political career ==
Running as the PAREN candidate in the 13 November 2005 presidential election, Bado placed third out of 13 candidates, receiving 2.60% of the vote.

In the May 2007 parliamentary election, Bado was elected to the National Assembly as a PAREN candidate in Kadiogo Province; he was the only PAREN candidate to win a seat in the election.

In the November 2015 parliamentary election, Bado was again elected to the National Assembly as a PAREN candidate in Kadiogo Province.
