= Union of Sankarist Parties =

Burkinabè political alliance

The Union of Sankarist Parties (French: Union des Partis Sankarist) was a Sankarist political alliance in Burkina Faso.

In the 2007 parliamentary elections the party won two of the 111 seats in the National Assembly.

== See also ==
- Union for Rebirth / Sankarist Party
