= 1959 Upper Voltan constitutional referendum =

- 15 March 1959

Results
Choice	Votes	%
Yes	1,018,936	80.03%
No	254,243	19.97%
Valid votes	1,273,179	94.66%
Invalid or blank votes	71,753	5.34%
Total votes	1,344,932	100.00%
Registered voters/turnout	1,957,732	68.7%

A constitutional referendum was held in the Republic of Upper Volta on 15 March 1959. Unlike almost all other French colonies in Africa (which were presidential republics), the new constitution would make the territory a parliamentary republic with a unicameral National Assembly. It was approved by 80% of voters with a 68.7% turnout.

== Results ==
Choice	Votes	%
For	1,018,936	80.03
Against	254,243	19.97
Invalid/blank votes	71,753	–
Total	1,344,932	100
Registered voters/turnout	1,957,732	68.7
Source: Sternberger et al.
