= Citizen's Popular Rally =

Political party in Burkina Faso

The Citizen's Popular Rally (French: Rassemblement Populaire des Citoyens) was a political party in Burkina Faso. In the 2007 parliamentary elections the party won one of the 111 seats in the National Assembly. They did not win any seats in the 2012 elections.
