= Union pour la République =

Union pour la République can refer to:

- Union for the Republic (Burkina Faso)
- Union for the Republic (Congo)
- Union for the Republic (Togo)
- Union for the Republic (Mauritania)
