= Sankarist Pan-African Convention =

Political party in Burkina Faso

- Founded: 2000
- Merger of: Burkinabè Socialist Bloc; Party of United Social Democracy; Social Forces Front (Partially)
- Ideology: Sankarism; Socialism; Pan-Africanism
- Political position: Left-wing

The Sankarist Pan-African Convention (French: Convention Panafricaine Sankariste) was a political party in Burkina Faso. CPS was formed in 2000, through the merger of the Burkinabè Socialist Bloc, Party of United Social Democracy and a fraction of the Social Forces Front.

The party is led by Ernest Nongma Ouédraogo, former Minister of Security in the government of Thomas Sankara. The party is Sankarist.

At the last legislative elections, 5 May 2002, the party won 2.6% of the popular vote and 3 out of 111 seats.

In March 2009 it merged with Union for Rebirth/Sankarist Mouvement and a part of the Social Forces Front to form the Union for Rebirth / Sankarist Party.
