= Burkinabé Socialist Party =

- Leader: Ouindélassida François Ouédraogo
- Founded: December 1990
- Dissolved: May 2001
- Split from: African Independence Party
- Merged into: Party for Democracy and Progress
- Ideology: Socialism
- Political position: Left-wing

Burkinabé Socialist Party (in French: Party Socialiste Burkinabé) was a political party in Burkina Faso. The PSB split from the PAI in 1990. Its leader was Ouindélassida François Ouédraogo.

At the legislative elections in 1992, the PSB won 1.2% of the popular vote and 1 out of 111 seats. In 1997, it won 1.8% of the vote and one seat.

In May 2001, it merged with the Party for Democracy and Progress.
