= New Alliance of Faso =

Political party in Burkina Faso

- Leader: Rasmané Ouédraogo
- Founded: 31 January 2015
- Dissolved: 29 January 2026
- Ideology: Social democracy
- Political position: Centre-left
- National Assembly: 2 / 127

The New Alliance of Faso (French: Nouvelle Alliance du Faso, NAFA) was a social democratic political party in Burkina Faso.

== History ==
NAFA was established on 31 January 2015, with many of its members having previously been part of the Congress for Democracy and Progress or the ADF–RDA. In the 2015 general elections it received 4% of the vote, winning two of the 127 seats in the National Assembly, one by proportional representation (taken by Zilma Bacye) and one in the constituency vote (Anicet Bazie in Sanguié Province).

All political parties in Burkina Faso were dissolved through decree by the junta on 29 January 2026.
