= New Era for Democracy =

Political party in Burkina Faso

New Era for Democracy Nouveau Temps pour la Démocratie
- Leader: Vincent Dabilgou
- Founded: 13 March 2015
- Dissolved: 29 January 2026

New Era for Democracy (French: Nouveau Temps pour la Démocratie, NTD) was a political party in Burkina Faso.

== History ==
The NTD was established on 13 March 2015 by former Minister of Urban Development Vincent Dabilgou. In the 2015 general elections it received 2% of the vote, winning three of the 127 seats in the National Assembly, one by proportional representation (taken by Emmanuel Lankoande) and two in the constituency vote (Larba Ousmane Lankouande in Gnagna Province and Issa Barry in Yagha Province).

All political parties in Burkina Faso were dissolved through decree by the junta on 29 January 2026.
