= Hama Arba Diallo =

Burkinabé politician and diplomat

Hama Arba Diallo (23 March 1939 – 30 September 2014) was a Burkinabé politician, diplomat and civil servant. He was minister of foreign affairs of Upper Volta (now Burkina Faso) from 1983 to 1984. Diallo, an opponent of President Blaise Compaoré, stood as a candidate in the 2010 presidential election.

== Career ==
Diallo entered the United Nations as the Director of the United Nations Sudano-Sahelian Office from 1979 to 1983. After leaving the U.N., Diallo was appointed as Minister of Foreign Affairs under Captain Thomas Sankara on 24 August 1983, serving in that position until 1984. From 1988 to 1989, Diallo served as Ambassador to China, India and Japan. Thereafter, Diallo returned to the United Nations as the Special Representative of the Secretary General for the Conference on Environment and Development from 1990 to 1992 and as Executive Secretary of the United Nations Convention to Combat Desertification beginning in 1996.

Diallo was elected to the National Assembly in the May 2007 parliamentary election as a candidate of the Party for Democracy and Socialism (PDS) in Séno Province. He was one of only two PDS candidates to win a seat. In the National Assembly, he sat as part of the Alternance-Démocratie-Justice Parliamentary Group and served as Fifth Vice-president of the National Assembly.

He was re-elected to the National Assembly in 2012, and also served as Mayor of Dori. A member of the opposition to President Compaoré, Diallo remained active in opposition politics and continued working in his two elected posts as Deputy and Mayor until his death on the night of 30 September–1 October 2014. Diallo, who was 75 years old, reportedly died unexpectedly of heart failure.

Preceded by Michel Kafando	Foreign Minister of Upper Volta; 1983-1984	Succeeded by Basile Guissou
