= Party for Democracy and Socialism/Metba =

Political party in Burkina Faso

Party for Democracy and Socialism/Metba Parti pour la démocratie et le socialisme/Metba
- Founded: 31 March 2012 (14 years, 3 days)
- Dissolved: 29 January 2026 (64 days)
- Merger of: Party for Democracy and Socialism; African Independence Party; Citizens League of Builders; Faso Metba
- Ideology: Communism; Socialism
- Political position: Left-wing

The Party for Democracy and Socialism/Metba (French: Parti pour la démocratie et le socialisme/Metba, abbreviated PDS/Metba) was a political party in Burkina Faso. PDS/Metba was founded on 31 March 2012 through the merger of Party for Democracy and Socialism of Hama Arba Diallo, African Independence Party of Philippe Ouédraogo, the Citizens League of Builders of Dr. Jean-Marie Sanou and Faso Metba of Etienne Traoré. At the founding congress of the party, Hama Arba Diallo was elected chairman of the party, Etienne Traoré and Jean-Marie Sanou as vice chairmen and Ibrahima Koné et au and Blaise Somé (Professor at the University of Ouagadougou) as general secretaries.

On 29 January 2026, all parties, including this one, were dissolved through decree by the junta government in Burkina Faso.
