= Pargui Emile Paré =

Burkinabé politician

Pargui Emile Paré is a Burkinabé politician and member of the People's Movement for Socialism/Federal Party (MPS/FP).

== Political career ==
Running as candidate of the Socialist Alliance, a coalition of the MPS/FP and Unified Socialist Party (PSU). In the 13 November 2005 elections, Paré placed 10th out of 13 candidates, receiving 0.87% of the vote. Paré has also been announced as a candidate in the 2010 presidential election.

Paré ran again for president in 2010, against incumbent Blaise Compaore.

He is a member of the opposition People's Movement for Progress (MPP), and has called the 2014 Burkinabé uprising the "Black Spring".
