= Democratic and Popular Rally =

Political party in Burkina Faso

- Leader: Nana Thibaut
- Ideology: Sankarism; Socialism
- Political position: Left-wing

Democratic and Popular Rally (French: Rassemblement Démocratique et Populaire, RDP) was a Sankarist political party in Burkina Faso. It was led by Nana Thibaut. It was merged into the Congress for Democracy and Progress.
