= Convergence of Hope =

Political party in Burkina Faso

Convergence of Hope Convergence de l'Espoir
- Leader: Jean-Hubert Bazié
- Founded: July 2004
- Dissolved: 29 January 2026
- Split from: Union for Rebirth/Sankarist Movement
- Ideology: Sankaraism; Socialism
- Political position: Left-wing

Convergence of Hope (French: Convergence de l'Espoir) was a Sankarist political party in Burkina Faso. It was founded in July 2004 by the Current of Democrats Faithful to the Ideal of Thomas Sankara that split from the Union for Rebirth/Sankarist Movement in 2003.

It was led by Jean-Hubert Bazié.

== History ==
The Current of Democrats Faithful to the Ideal of Thomas Sankara (in French: Courant des Démocrates Fidèles à l'Idéal de Thomas Sankara) was founded in 2003 as split from the Union for Rebirth/Sankarist Movement. In July 2004, it was renamed Convergence of Hope.

On 29 January 2026, all parties, including this one, were dissolved through decree by the junta government in Burkina Faso.
