= Burkinabé Socialist Bloc =

- Founded: December 1990
- Dissolved: 2000
- Merged into: Sankarist Pan-African Convention
- Ideology: Sankarism; Socialism
- Political position: Left-wing

Burkinabé Socialist Bloc (in French: Bloc Socialiste Burkinabé) was a Sankarist political party in Burkina Faso. BSB was founded in December 1990 by Nongma Ernest Ouédraogo. Ouédraogo became the general secretary of BSB. Ouédraogo had been released from jail the previous year. He had served as Minister of Security under Sankara.

The slogan of BSB was Action et Victoire et Bloc.

In August 1995 Ouédraogo was jailed following a libel suit. He was released five months later.

In January 1996 a faction split and joined the Congress for Democracy and Progress.

In 2000 BSB merged into the Sankarist Pan-African Convention (CPS).
