= Socialist Alliance (Burkina Faso) =

Socialist Alliance (in French: Alliance Socialiste) was a political coalition in Burkina Faso, consisting of the People's Movement for Socialism/Federal Party of Emile Paré and the Unified Socialist Party. Pargui Emile Paré was the president of AS. In the presidential election of 13 November 2005, its candidate Paré won 0.87% of the popular vote.
