= Jean-Baptiste Natama =

Burkinabé politician (1964–2018)

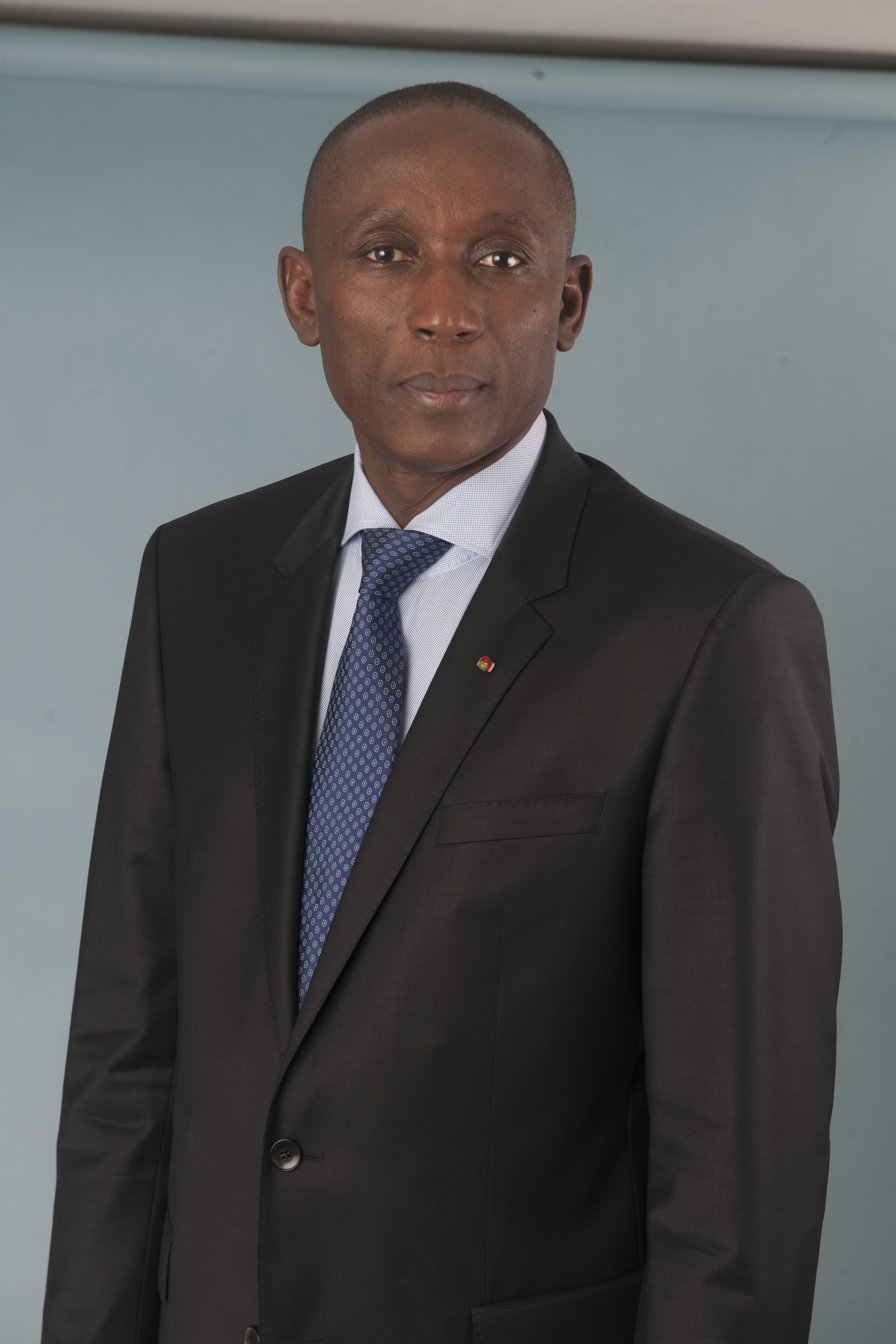
- Natama in 2015

Personal details
- Born: 30 August 1964
- Died: 18 March 2018 (aged 53)

Military service
- Allegiance: Republic of Upper Volta; Burkina Faso
- Years of service: 1983–1990
- Battles/wars: Agacher Strip War

Jean-Baptiste Natama (30 August 1964 – 18 March 2018) was a Burkinabé politician, diplomat, writer, and former candidate for the Presidency in the country's 2015 election.

In 1983 he enlisted in the Burkinabe army. He fought in the Agacher Strip War of 1985, and for his service was awarded the Gold Medal of the Torch of the Revolution by President Thomas Sankara. He was discharged in May 1990.
