= Party for Democracy and Progress (Burkina Faso) =

Burkinabè political party

The Party for Democracy and Progress (French: Parti pour la Démocratie et le Progrès, CDP) was a political party in Burkina Faso (former Upper Volta). It was founded in April 1994 after a split in the National Convention of Progressive Patriots–Social Democratic Party in May 1993.

It merged in February 1996 with the Union of the Democratic Left and the Party of Social Progress.

After merger with the Burkinabè Socialist Party the PDP became the Party for Democracy and Progress / Socialist Party.

At the legislative elections in 1997 the party won 10.1% of the popular vote and 6 out of 111 seats.
