= Eddie Komboïgo =

Burkina Faso politician

Leader of Congress for Democracy and Progress
- Incumbent
- Assumed office 10 May 2015

Personal details
- Party: Congress for Democracy and Progress

Eddie Komboïgo is a Burkinabe accountant and politician who has been the leader of the Congress for Democracy and Progress since 2015, and was an unsuccessful presidential candidate in the 2020 election. He was a member of the National Assembly of Burkina Faso before the 2014 uprising. He was arrested for possible involvement in the 2015 Burkina Faso coup attempt, but was not convicted.

== Career ==
Komboïgo is the head of Komboïgo et Associés, an accounting firm. His house was raided during the 2014 Burkina Faso uprising. Komboïgo was a member of the National Assembly of Burkina Faso prior to the uprisings.

The Congress for Democracy and Progress (CDP) appointed Komboïgo as its leader on 10 May 2015. The CDP was the ruling party of Burkina Faso before Blaise Compaoré was overthrown. He was an ally of Gilbert Diendéré.

A few days before the 2015 Burkina Faso coup attempt Komboïgo left Burkina Faso. He was arrested on 23 January 2016, on allegations of being involved in the coup. He was released on bail on 30 May. He temporarily stepped down as leader of the CDP while being prosecuted, but was cleared of the charges against him. He defeated Boureima Badini by a vote of 39 to 33 to be reelected as leader of the CDP on 6 May 2018.

Komboïgo tried to run in the 2015 election, but the Constitutional Council rejected his candidacy due to rules prohibiting pro-Compaoré candidates. He was a presidential candidate in the 2020 election, but lost to Roch Marc Christian Kaboré.

Komboïgo was among the political figures consulted by the military junta after the January 2022 coup d'état.

== Works cited ==
=== News ===
- "Burkina Faso arrests ex-presidential guards for armoury raid". France 24. 25 January 2016. Archived from the original on 1 July 2025.
- "Burkina Faso: Eddie Komboïgo réélu à la tête du CDP, Blaise Compaoré nommé président d'honneur". Jeune Afrique. 7 May 2018. Archived from the original on 1 July 2025.
- "Eddie Komboïgo: "La junte a demandé notre contribution"". Deutsche Welle. 2 February 2022. Archived from the original on 1 July 2025.
- "Head of former President Compaore's party arrested". Africanews. 25 January 2016. Archived from the original on 26 January 2016.
- "Opposition party in Burkina reappoints leader". Africanews. 18 December 2021. Archived from the original on 20 December 2021.
- Roger, Benjamin (30 May 2016). "Burkina: Eddie Komboïgo et la belle-fille du général Diendéré ont été remis en liberté provisoire". Jeune Afrique. Archived from the original on 1 July 2025.
- Roger, Benjamin (10 July 2015). "Burkina: Eddie Komboïgo sera le candidat du CDP à la présidentielle". Jeune Afrique. Archived from the original on 1 July 2025.

=== Web ===
- "Extrait des minutes du Greffe du Conseil constitutionnel" (PDF). Burkina Faso. Archived (PDF) from the original on 24 May 2025.
