= Begnon-Damien Koné =

Burkinabé politician

Begnon-Damien Koné (1921 – 10 February 1986) was a Burkinabé politician who served in the French Senate from 1958 to 1959.

Koné was born in 1921 in Tengrela, Burkina Faso, into a notable family. He studied at Bingerville upper primary school, where he obtained the CEPS (Certificate of Higher Primary Studies).

He was elected to the French Senate on 9 June 1958 as senator for Haute-Volta, and was President of the National Assembly of Upper Volta. His term in the senate ended on 15 July 1959.

He died on 10 February 1986 in Colombes, France.
