= Toubé Clément Dakio =

Burkinabé politician

Toubé Clément Dakio (born 1939) was a Burkinabé politician and President of the Union for Democracy and Development (UDD) party, a minor political party in Burkina Faso.

Dakio founded the UDD in November 2001 and served as the party's president. Running as the UDD candidate in the 13 November 2005 presidential election, Dakio placed 12th out of 13 candidates, receiving 0.37% of the vote.

Dakio died May 18, 2026 in Doumbala.
