= Burkinabé Party for Refoundation =

Political party in Burkina Faso

- Leader: Gilbert Bouda
- Founded: Unknown
- Ideology: Sankarism; Socialism
- Political position: Left-wing

Burkinabé Party for Refoundation (in French: Parti Burkinabè pour la Refondation, PBR) is a Sankarist political party in Burkina Faso, led by Gilbert Bouda.

As PBR candidate, Bouda ran in the 13 November 2005 presidential election, placing ninth out of 13 candidates with 1.05% of the vote.
