= Saran Sérémé =

Personal details
- Born: 17 November 1968 (age 57) Ouagadougou, Republic of Upper Volta
- Party: Party for Development and Change
- Other political affiliations: Congress for Democracy and Progress
- Occupation: Politician, businesswoman

Saran Sérémé (born 17 November 1968, Ouagadougou) is a Burkinabé politician. Sérémé was a candidate for the Presidency in the country's 2015 election. Sérémé is the head of the Party for Development and Change (PDC). Sérémé was previously a member of the Congress for Democracy and Progress party. She was also a businesswoman prior to entering politics.
