= Sankarism =

Left-wing ideology of Thomas Sankara

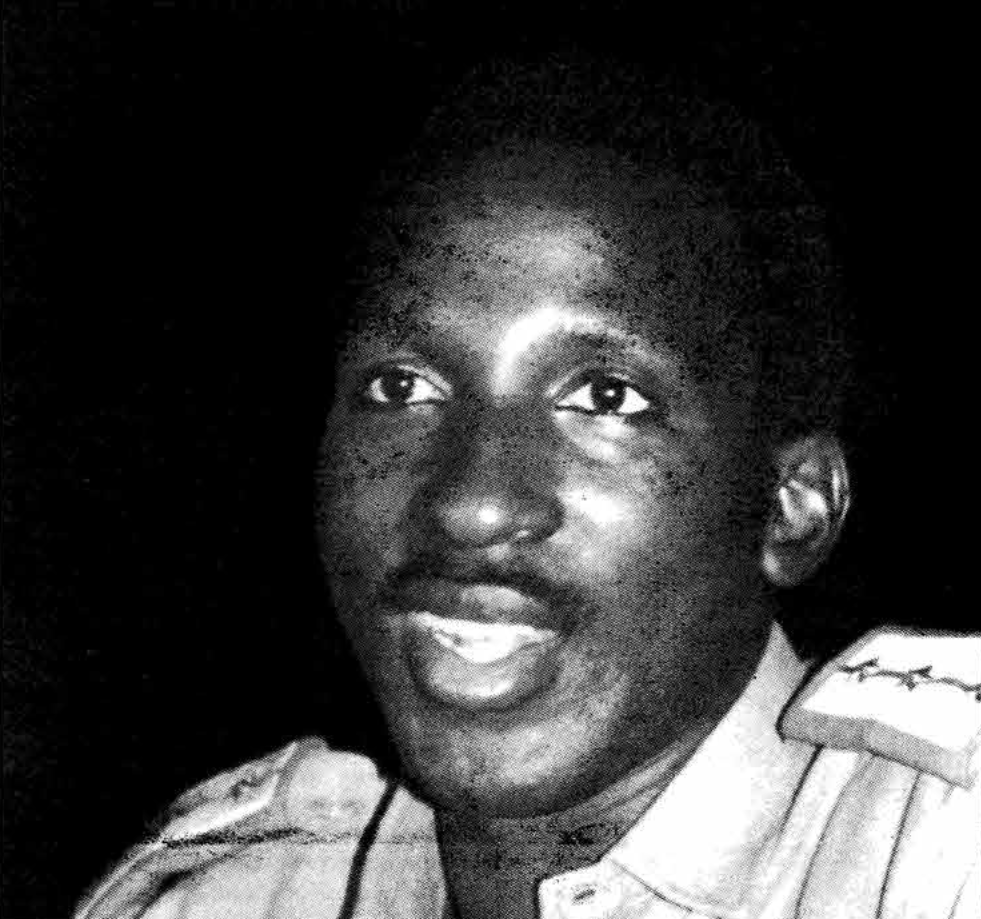
Thomas Sankara, after whom Sankarism is named

Sankarism (also written Sankaraism) is a term sometimes applied to denote a left-wing ideological trend within the politics of Burkina Faso, as well as the policies of the military government led by the first president of Burkina Faso, Thomas Sankara. Sankara came to power in what was then the Republic of Upper Volta in a popularly supported 1983 military coup, and ruled until his assassination in a coup led by Blaise Compaoré in 1987.

There is a strong political dissonance between the movements which ascribe to Sankara's political legacy and ideals, a fact which the Burkinabé opposition politician Bénéwendé Stanislas Sankara (no relation) described in 2001 as being "due to a lack of definition of the concept." The "Sankarists" range from communists and more moderate socialists to nationalists and populists.

== History ==
During his time in power, Sankara – a well-known war veteran noted for his charisma – attempted to bring about what he called the "Democratic and Popular Revolution" (Révolution démocratique et populaire), a radical transformation of society with a focus on self-sufficiency. A number of organizations were formed to implement this revolution, among them the Committees for the Defense of the Revolution, the Popular Revolutionary Tribunals and the Pioneers of the Revolution. A vast number of reforms were enacted in the newly renamed Burkina Faso between 1983 and 1987, including mass vaccination programs, reforestation, elimination of slums through new housing developments, and the development of national infrastructure such as railway networks. Most of these were undone after the military coup which ousted and killed Sankara. Prior to his death, the Burkinabé government faced significant allegations of human rights abuses from Amnesty International and other international organizations, including extrajudicial executions and arbitrary detentions.

Even after the death of Thomas Sankara his legacy lived on, much due to his charismatic personal image. Sometimes dubbed the "Che Guevara of Africa" due to his similarities in style to the Argentinian revolutionary and the inspiration he took from the Cuban Revolution, Sankara became known for his frugal living, motorcycle riding, guitar playing, and opposition to the cult of personality, all personal traits which set him aside from contemporary African statesmen. For example, when asked why he didn't want his portrait hung in public places, as was the norm for other leaders on the continent, he replied "There are seven million Thomas Sankaras." Ideologically, Sankara was a pan-Africanist and anti-imperialist who sought to reclaim the African identity of his nation and opposed neocolonialism, and although he was believed to be a communist for studying the works of Karl Marx and Vladimir Lenin, he often refused to put his political ideology under one title using both Christian and various secular ideologies of leftist leaders in order to determine his political actions.

One of the first groups to connect ideologically with the label of "Sankarism" was the Sankarist Movement, formed in exile in Paris only weeks after Sankara's assassination on 15 October 1987. Since then, self-identified Sankarist political parties and other organizations have been a common feature within the Burkinabé opposition movement against the government of President Compaoré. Many Sankarist leaders have a past in either Sankara's government or in the organizations he created. For example, Ernest Nongma Ouédraogo – leader of the Sankarist Pan-African Convention – was Minister of Security under Sankara, and Sams’K Le Jah – leader of the Citizens' Broom (Le Balai Citoyen) – received his political education as a teenager in the Pioneer movement.

The Sankarists have been prominent in both the 2011 Burkinabé protests and the 2014 Burkinabé uprising. The latter successfully overthrew President Blaise Compaoré in late October 2014, forcing the leader to resign and flee the country to the Ivory Coast and causing a military takeover. Thomas Sankara has been cited as a major inspiration for the protesters, some going as far as dubbing the uprising the "Revolution 2.0" in reference to Sankara's "Democratic and Popular Revolution" during the 1980s.

Since the September 2022 Burkinabé coup d'etat which installed Ibrahim Traoré as Head of State, the policies of Burkina Faso's government have been likened to those of Thomas Sankara by both domestic and foreign observers. Burkina Faso's former interim prime minister, Apollinaire J. Kyélem de Tambèla, was at one point personally invited by Sankara to join his cabinet, and has since stated that Burkina Faso "cannot be developed outside the path set by Thomas Sankara." The legacy of Sankara has been invoked in public speeches by Traoré, and the government's policies of populism, geopolitical non-alignment and nationalization of foreign assets have been compared to those of the Sankara government.

== Sankarist organisations ==
=== Burkina Faso ===
Historical and current Sankarist groups include:

- Burkinabé Party for Refoundation
- Burkinabé Socialist Bloc
- Convergence for Social Democracy
- Convergence of Hope
- Current of Democrats Faithful to the Ideal of Thomas Sankara
- Democratic and Popular Rally
- Movement for Tolerance and Progress
- National Patriots' Party
- Party of Social Democracy
- Sankara Collective
- Sankarist Democratic Front
- Sankarist Movement
- Sankarist Pan-African Convention
- Social Forces Front
- The Citizens' Broom
- Union for Rebirth / Sankarist Movement
- Union of Sankarist Parties

=== Abroad ===
The Economic Freedom Fighters (EFF) is a Black nationalist, far-left political party in South Africa, founded in 2013 by Julius Malema, the controversial former President of the African National Congress Youth League. The party is currently the third-largest party in both houses of the South African parliament, receiving 1,169,259 votes and a 6.35% share of the vote in the 2014 general election. The EFF claims to take significant inspiration from Sankara in terms of both style and ideology. In a May 2014 column, the prominent EFF member Jackie Shandu declared his party a "proudly Sankarist formation". Expelled from that party, Andile Mngxitama founded Black First Land First in 2015, with black consciousness and Pan-Africanist policies and a Sankarist leadership ethos.

Didier Awadi, a Senegalese hip hop musician and one of the most prominent rappers in Francophone West Africa, describes Thomas Sankara as his greatest inspiration politically. He has recorded several songs referring to Sankara, and visited the killed leader's family in Burkina Faso. In 2003 he formed "Studio Sankara", a music label and recording studio.

== See also ==
- African socialism
- Alliance of Sahel States
- History of Burkina Faso
- Jerry Rawlings
- Nkrumaism
