= Movement for Democracy in Africa =

Political party in Burkina Faso

The Movement for Democracy in Africa (French: Mouvement pour la Démocratie en Afrique, MDA) was a political party in Burkina Faso.

== History ==
The MDA was established in November 2014. In the 2015 general elections it received 0.58% of the vote, winning one of the constituency seats (party president Amadou Tall in Loroum Province).

All political parties in Burkina Faso were dissolved through decree by the junta on 29 January 2026.
