= Sankarist Democratic Front =

Political party in Burkina Faso

Sankarist Democratic Front Front Démocratique Sankariste
- Founded: 2004
- Dissolved: 29 January 2026 (64 days)
- Split from: Sankarist Pan-African Convention
- Ideology: Sankarism; Socialism
- Political position: Left-wing

The Sankarist Democratic Front (French: Front Démocratique Sankariste, FDS) was a Sankarist political party in Burkina Faso. It was founded in June 2004 as a split from the Sankarist Pan-African Convention. It is led by Fidèle Meng-Néré Kientéga and Inoussa Kaboré.

On 29 January 2026, all parties, including this one, were dissolved through decree by the junta government in Burkina Faso.
