= Chamber of Representatives of Burkina Faso =

Upper house of Burkina Faso

Type
- Type: Upper house of the National Assembly of Burkina Faso

History
- Founded: June 1991
- Disbanded: January 2002
- Seats: 132

Meeting place
- Ouagadougou, Burkina Faso

Chamber of Representatives of Burkina Faso was the upper house of the bicameral legislature of Burkina Faso from 1991 to 2002.

The upper chamber was established in June 1991 by the constitution. It had 132 members. The members were elected with indirect elections from provincial councils, religious communities, trade unions, universities, NGOs, and other interest groups. Four members were appointed by the President of Burkina Faso. The chamber had advisory role on legislation. The upper chamber was abolished in January 2002.

== Presidents ==
President of the Chamber	Period	Notes
Abdoulkader Cissé	December 1995 - January 1999	
Moussa Sanogo	January 1999 - January 2002	

== See also ==
- Politics of Burkina Faso
- List of legislatures by country
