= Ousmane Bougouma =

Burkinabe politician

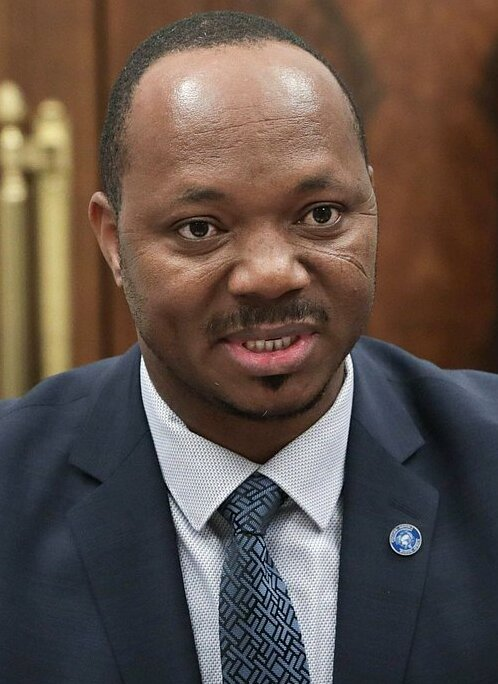
- Bougouma in 2023

President of the Legislative Assembly of Burkina Faso
- Incumbent
- Assumed office November 11, 2022
- Preceded by: Aboubacar Tobuyeni

Member of the Legislative Assembly for Plateau-Central Region
- Incumbent
- Assumed office March 22, 2022

Personal details
- Born: December 31, 1981 (age 44) Plateau-Central Region, Burkina Faso
- Children: 4
- Education: University of Geneva; University of Rouen (2008, 2013)
- Occupation: Professor

Ousmane Bougouma is a Burkinabe politician who has served as a member of the Burkinabe parliament for Plateau-Central Region since March 2022, and as president of the Legislative Assembly since October 2022.

== Biography ==
Bougouma was born on December 31, 1981, in Plateau-Central Region, Burkina Faso. He is a member of the royal family of Matté, in Ziniaré Department, as his father is the village chief. His mother is from the village of Betta, also in Ziniare. Bougouma developed a passion for law after a court trial during his studies at Bassy Provincial High School. He attended the University of Geneva, obtaining a degree in private law, and subsequently obtained his master's degree in international and European law in 2008 from the University of Rouen. He also obtained a doctorate in private law in 2013 from the same place.

Bougouma then became an assistant professor at Thomas Sankara University in 2014. He then taught at several other Burkinabe institutions, including Saint Thomas Aquinas University in Ouagadougou, the University of Saint Dominic of West Africa, and the University of Aube Nouvelle. In February 2016, he became the legal advisor to the President of the University of Ouagadougou - Joseph Ki-Zerbo. In 2020, Bougouma became the head of the National School of Administration and Magistracy.

=== Political career ===
Shortly after the January 2022 Burkina Faso coup d'état by Paul-Henri Sandaogo Damiba, Bougouma declared his support for the putschists. In March 2022, he became a deputy in the Legislative Assembly, being chosen by leaders of Plateau-Central to represent the region. He was appointed as the head of the Commission on General, Institutional, and Human Rights Affairs, which allowed him to rule on constitutional and judicial issues, increasing his political influence.

Bougouma was reappointed as a deputy after the September 2022 Burkina Faso coup d'état. On November 11, 2022, he was elected as President of the Legislative Assembly, beating Aboubacar Tobuyeni with 65 out of 67 votes.

=== Personal life ===
Bougouma speaks French, English, German, and Mooré. He is married and the father of four children. He is a member of the LEKMA organization, which educates orphans. He is also head of external relations of the Association for Solidarity and Human Development in Ziniare.
