= Union for a New Burkina =

Political party in Burkina Faso

The Union for a New Burkina (French: Union pour un Burkina Nouveau, UBN) is a political party in Burkina Faso.

== History ==
The UBN was formed on 14 February 2015, based on an association established in 2011 following the 2011 Burkinabé protests. Former Minister of Sport Yacouba Ouédraogo was appointed party president. In the 2015 general elections it received 0.86% of the vote, winning one of the constituency seats (Ag Amlaouna Agali in Oudalan Province).

All political parties in Burkina Faso were dissolved through decree by the junta on 29 January 2026.
