= Marlène Zebango =

African politician

Marlène Habata Zebango is a Burkinabé politician who was a Minister for Youth and Sports in the government of Burkina Faso from 1991 to 1993.
