= Party for Democracy and Progress / Socialist Party =

Political party in Burkina Faso

Party for Democracy and Progress/Socialist Party
- Founded: May 2001
- Dissolved: 29 January 2026
- Merger of: Party for Democracy and Progress; Burkinabè Socialist Party
- Ideology: Socialism; Democratic socialism Social democracy
- Political position: Left-wing

The Party for Democracy and Progress / Socialist Party (French: Parti pour la Démocratie et le Progrès / Parti Socialiste) is a political party in Burkina Faso (former Upper Volta).

It was founded in May 2001 by merger of the Party for Democracy and Progress with the Burkinabè Socialist Party.

In the parliamentary election held on 5 May 2002, the party won 7.5% of the popular vote and 10 out of 111 seats. In the presidential election of 13 November 2005, its candidate Ali Lankoandé won 1.74% of the popular vote.

The party won two seats in the 2007 parliamentary election.

In the 2010 presidential election, the PDP/PS candidate Ouampoussoga François Kaboré won .6% of the popular vote.
