= Nayabtigungu Congo Kaboré =

Burkinabé politician

Emmanuel Nayabtigungu Congo Kaboré
- Born: June 20, 1948 (age 77)
- Occupation: Politician
- Known for: Leader of the Movement for Tolerance and Progress party

Emmanuel Nayabtigungu Congo Kaboré (born 20 June 1948) is a Burkinabé politician and leader of the Movement for Tolerance and Progress (MTP) party. Kaboré was the general secretary of government of the National Council for the Revolution in the 1980s. In 1999 he was included in the national government, and remained in this role until 2002.
