= Union for Democracy and Social Progress (Burkina Faso) =

Former political party in Burkina Faso

Union for Democracy and Social Progress Union pour la Démocratie et le Progrès Social

The Union for Democracy and Social Progress (French: Union pour la Démocratie et le Progrès Social) was a political party in Burkina Faso.

In the 2007 parliamentary elections the party won one of the 111 seats in the National Assembly.
