= Movement for Tolerance and Progress =

Political party in Burkina Faso

- Leader: Nayabtigungu Congo Kaboré
- Founded: September 1987
- Ideology: Sankaraism; Socialism
- Political position: Left-wing

Movement for Tolerance and Progress (in French: Mouvement pour la Tolérance et le Progrès, MTP and in Mooré: Moog Teeb Panpaasgo) is a Sankarist political party in Burkina Faso. It was founded in September 1987. It is led by Nayabtigungu Congo Kaboré.

It won 0.3% of the popular vote in the parliamentary elections of 1997. In 2005 the party took part in the presidential election of 13 November, where its candidate Nayabtigungu Congo Kaboré won 0.32% of the popular vote.
