= Ali Lankoandé =

Burkinabé politician (1930–2014)

Ali Lankoandé (10 November 1930 – 28 May 2014) was a Burkinabé politician from Burkina Faso. He was President of the Party for Democracy and Progress/Socialist Party (PDP/PS) from 2005 to 2008.

== Biography ==
Lankoandé headed the National Social Security Fund and served as a deputy in the National Assembly of Burkina Faso, as well as Minister of National Education, during the 1970s.

Lankoandé was elected to succeed Joseph Ki-Zerbo as President of the PDP/PS on 5 February 2005. Running as the PDP/PS candidate in the 13 November 2005 presidential election, Lankoandé placed sixth out of 13 candidates, receiving 1.74% of the vote. Lankoandé died on 28 May 2014.

His wife was Diallo/lankoande Fatima.

His children are Lankoandé/Simporé Aïssa, Lankoandé/Ouedraogo Ramata, Lankoandé Karim, Lankoandé/Yoni Aminata, Lankoandé Ousseini, Lankoandé Hassan, Lankoandé/Ouedraogo Mariam.
