= Unified Socialist Party (Burkina Faso) =

Political party in Burkina Faso

Unified Socialist Party Parti Socialiste Unifié
- Leader: Benoît Lompo
- Founded: 29 September 2001 (24 years, 186 days)
- Dissolved: 29 January 2026 (64 days)
- Split from: Burkinabè Socialist Party
- Ideology: Socialism
- Political position: Left-wing
- National affiliation: Socialist Alliance; United Burkinabé Opposition

The Unified Socialist Party (French: Parti Socialiste Unifié) was a political party in Burkina Faso. The PSU was founded in 2001, following a split from the Burkinabè Socialist Party (PSB).

The party was led by Benoît Lompo. Lompo died October 30, 2007. PSU was part of the United Burkinabé Opposition (OBU) and the Socialist Alliance (together with the People's Movement for Socialism/Federal Party). However, the decision of the Socialist Alliance to support Emile Paré in the 2005 presidential elections has strained the relations between PSU and OBU. The party was unsuccessful in 2007, 2012, and 2015 assembly elections.

On 3 March 2016, the PSU joined three other left-wing political parties; CPR/MP, PALOUPA and JCB, to form the Union of Extraparlementary Left Parties (fr: L’Union de la Gauche Extra Parlementaire). L'UGEP's main purpose was reportedly to facilitate the dialogue between civil society and the then-ruling president Kaboré, who they viewed as being unwilling to listen to leftist sentiment among the general populace. As of 2025, the extent of the party's operations are unknown, given that the current ruling military junta has suspended the activity of political parties since 2023.

On 29 January 2026, all parties, including this one, were dissolved through decree by the junta government in Burkina Faso.
