= African Independence Party (Burkina Faso) =

African Independence Party Parti Africain de l'Indépendance
- Leader: Philippe Ouédraogo
- Founded: 1963; 63 years ago
- Dissolved: 1999; 27 years ago
- Succeeded by: African Independence Party (Touré); Party for Democracy and Socialism
- Ideology: Communism; Marxism–Leninism; Pan-Africanism
- Political position: Left-wing

The African Independence Party (French: Parti Africain de l'Indépendance) was a Marxist-Leninist party in Burkina Faso (formerly Upper Volta), led by Philippe Ouédraogo.

It was founded as the Voltan Section of the African Independence Party (PAI) on 15 August 1963. In 1973, PAI launched the Patriotic League for Development (LIPAD) as its open mass front. LIPAD became an important movement during the revolution of 1983 and through LIPAD PAI took part in the Thomas Sankara government for one year. Then relations with Sankara soured and LIPAD was expelled from the government.

In the 1992 parliamentary elections, PAI was part of the pro-government Popular Front. PAI won two seats.

In 1999, the PAI split, and Soumane Touré formed a parallel PAI. The PAI led by Touré, which joined the government, obtained the legal recognition of the name PAI. The PAI led by Ouédraogo registered an electoral party, the Party for Democracy and Socialism, in 2002, in order to contest the elections on 5 May 2002. PDS won 1.7% of the popular vote and 2 out of 111 seats.

In 2005, Ouédraogo won 2.3% of the vote in the presidential elections. He was supported by the PAI, the PDS, the CDS, the GDP and the UFP.

PAI published L'Avant-Garde.

In 2012, the party merged into Party for Democracy and Socialism/Metba.
