= Bénéwendé Stanislas Sankara =

Burkinabé politician

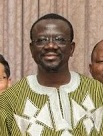

Bénéwendé Stanislas Sankara (born February 23, 1959) is a Burkinabé politician who served as the President of the Union for Rebirth / Sankarist Party (UNIR/PS) party throughout its existence. From 2021 to 2023, he served as President of the newly formed Union for Rebirth / Patriotic Sankarist Movement (UNIR/MPS).

== Life and career ==
Sankara was born in Toéssin. He founded the UNIR/MS in November 2000 and was one of three UNIR/MS candidates elected to the National Assembly in the 2002 parliamentary election. In the National Assembly, he was elected to the Pan-African Parliament. In June 2005 he resigned from both the National Assembly and the Pan-African Parliament to focus on his candidacy in the presidential election later in the year. Running as the UNIR/MS candidate in the election, held on 13 November 2005, Sankara placed second out of 13 candidates, receiving 4.88% of the vote; President Blaise Compaoré won the election with an overwhelming majority.

In the May 2007 parliamentary election, Sankara was elected to the National Assembly. He was one of four UNIR/MS candidates to be elected, and the only one elected on the party's national list.

Reacting to moves to change the constitution to remove presidential term limits, Sankara said in late July 2009 that it was unacceptable to change the constitution so that President Compaoré could "spend his whole life in power".

He was a candidate in the November 2010 presidential election, and stood again, after Compaoré was ousted, in the November 2015 presidential election (4th place with 2,77% of votes). He was also elected to the National Assembly in the concurrent parliamentary election as a candidate on the UNIR/PS national list, and on 12 January 2016 he was elected as First Vice-President of the National Assembly.

The UNIR/PS merged into the newly formed Union for Rebirth/Patriotic Sankarist Movement in 2021. Sankara went on to lead this party until January 2023.

== See also ==
- List of members of the Pan-African Parliament
