= National Convention of Progressive Democrats =

Political party in Burkina Faso

The National Convention of Progressive Democrats (French: Convention Nationale des Démocrates Progressistes) is a political party in Burkina Faso (formerly Upper Volta). In the 2002 Burkinabé parliamentary election, the party won 2.0% of the popular vote and 2 out of 111 seats.
