= Union of Democrats and Independent Progressives =

Political party in Burkina Faso

The Union of Democrats and Independent Progressives (French: Union des Démocrates et Progressistes Indépendants) was a political party in Burkina Faso. At the last legislative elections, 5 May 2002, the party won 0.4% of the popular vote and 1 out of 111 seats.

On 29 January 2026, all parties, including this one, were dissolved through decree by the junta government in Burkina Faso.
