= National Rebirth Party (Burkina Faso) =

Political party in Burkina Faso

National Rebirth Party Parti de la Renaissance National
- President: Tahirou Barry
- Founded: 1999
- Dissolved: 29 January 2026 (185 days)
- Ideology: Social conservatism
- Political position: Centre-right

Website
- www.leparen.com

The National Rebirth Party (French: Parti de la Renaissance Nationale, PAREN) was a political party in Burkina Faso.

== History ==
At the legislative election, 5 May 2002, the party won 2.7% of the popular vote and four out of 111 seats. In the presidential election of 13 November 2005, its candidate Laurent Bado won 2.6% of the popular vote. At the 2007 parliamentary elections, the party won one seat.

On 29 January 2026, all parties, including this one, were dissolved through decree by the junta government in Burkina Faso.
