= Alliance for Democracy and Federation – African Democratic Rally =

Alliance for Democracy and Federation – African Democratic Rally Alliance pour la Démocratie et la Fédération–Rassemblement Démocratique Africain
- Leader: Gilbert Noël Ouédraogo
- Founded: 1998; 28 years ago
- Dissolved: 29 January 2026; 6 months ago
- Ideology: Liberalism
- Political position: Centre
- International affiliation: Liberal International
- Continental affiliation: Africa Liberal Network

The Alliance for Democracy and Federation–African Democratic Rally (French: Alliance pour la Démocratie et la Fédération–Rassemblement Démocratique Africain) was a liberal political alliance in Burkina Faso, consisting of the Alliance for Democracy and Federation and the former ruling party African Democratic Rally.

Gilbert Noël Ouédraogo was the President of the ADF-RDA from 29 June 2003 until the party's dissolution on 29 January 2026; he served in President Blaise Compaoré's cabinet as Minister of Transport. His father, former Prime Minister Gérard Kango Ouédraogo, was designated as Honorary President for Life of the ADF-RDA in May 1998.

In the parliamentary election held on 5 May 2002, the Alliance won 12.7% of the popular vote and 17 out of 111 seats. In the May 2007 parliamentary election, the party won 14 seats. The ADF-RDA supported President Compaoré in the 2005 presidential election and again in the 2010 presidential election.

The party stands for pluralism, equality, justice and liberty for all. It supports freedom of expression, calls for tolerance and the rule of law, condemns human rights abuses, and supports liberal economic views. It lists education, employment and individual enterprise as constituting the pillars of economic development. The party welcomes Burkinabè from all backgrounds, ‘regardless of religious or philosophical beliefs, race and sex’, aiming to consolidate national unity and democracy.

ADF-RDA is a member of international liberal associations, including the Africa Liberal Network and Liberal International.

On 29 January 2026, all parties, including this one, were dissolved through decree by the junta government in Burkina Faso.
