= Union for the Republic (Burkina Faso) =

Political party in Burkina Faso

Union for the Republic Union pour la République
- Abbreviation: UPR
- Leader: Toussaint Abel Coulibaly
- Dissolved: 29 January 2026 (3 days)

The Union for the Republic (French: Union pour la République) was a registered political party in Burkina Faso. The UPR was led by Toussaint Abel Coulibaly. At the legislative elections, 6 May 2007, the party won five out of 111 seats.

During the 2014 Burkina Faso uprising, protesters raided and burned down Coulibaly's home. He had supported the former government of Blaise Compaoré, who had ruled since he came into power via a coup d'état in 1987.

On 29 January 2026, all parties, including this one, were dissolved through decree by the junta government in Burkina Faso.
