= Patriotic Front for Change =

Political party in Burkina Faso

The Patriotic Front for Change (French: Front Patriotique pour le Changement) was a political party in Burkina Faso. At the previous legislative elections on 5 May 2002, the party won 0.5% of the popular vote and one out of 111 seats.

On 29 January 2026, all parties, including this one, were dissolved through decree by the junta government in Burkina Faso.
