= Social Forces Front =

Political party in Burkina Faso

Social Forces Front Front des Forces Sociales
- Founded: Early 2000s (presumed)
- Dissolved: 29 January 2026 (110 days)
- Ideology: Sankarism; Socialism; Progressivism; Ecologism
- Political position: Left-wing

The Social Forces Front (French: Front des Forces Sociales, FFS) was a Sankarist political party in Burkina Faso.

FFS candidate Norbert Tiendrébéogo ran in the 13 November 2005 presidential election, placing 7th out of 13 candidates with 1.61% of the vote.

At the 2007 parliamentary elections it took part as part of the Union des Parties Sankaristes, UPS. Tiendrébéogo was elected to the National Assembly as a second candidate of UPS.

On 29 January 2026, all parties, including this one, were dissolved through decree by the junta government in Burkina Faso.
