= Elections in Burkina Faso =

Burkina Faso elects on the national level a head of state – the president – and a legislature. The president is elected for a five-year term by the people. The National Assembly (Assemblée Nationale) has 127 members, elected for a five-year term by proportional representation. Burkina Faso has held democratic elections since 1965. The history of elections has been slightly inconsistent, with the government dynamically changing at the hands of various coups, constitutional changes, and boycotts from various political parties. In 2015, the country experienced its first peaceful and fair election ever. Corruption plagued Burkina Faso's presidential elections for 50 years, but following a coup overthrowing Blaise Compaoré, the nation has seen more democratic and less corrupt electoral processes. Terrorism has played a substantial role in Burkina Faso's elections, with candidates running on the promise to keep the nation safe from the rise of Islamic jihadism they experienced in the 2010s. Historically, a few different parties have held power in Burkina. The Organization for Popular Democracy – Labour Movement was former president Compaoré's party affiliation, and thus they held power from 1987 to 2014. His party took power through a coup, and in 2014 also lost their control when the Regiment of Presidential Security overthrew the government.

== 1965 General Elections ==
The first ever presidential elections were held in Republic of Upper Volta in 1965. 100% of the vote went to the only candidate, Maurice Yaméogo, who was already president of the country, and leader of its only political party. Before this election, the president of the nation was appointed by the National Assembly.

== 1978 General Elections ==
The 1978 General Election was a two round election. No candidate received more than 50% of the votes in the first round, so following the election laws in Burkina Faso, the two candidates who received the most votes advanced to the second and final round. It was in that round that incumbent president Sangoulé Lamizana won the presidency with 56% of the vote in the second round. This election was the nation's first election with more than one party running, and the first since the 1977 Upper Voltan constitutional referendum passed.

== 1991 General Elections ==
The 1991 elections were the first elections held in Burkina Faso since 1978. In 1983 there was a coup d'état in which Thomas Sankara became the president until his murder in 1987. His rise to power soured Burkina Faso's relationship with the United States, due to his suspected marxist beliefs and close relationship with Muammar Gaddafi. 100% of the vote went towards the only candidate, Blaise Compaoré. The voter turnout was only about 25%, due to major political parties boycotting the election. 13% of the votes cast were declared invalid.

== 1998 General Elections ==
Incumbent president Blaise Compaoré won the presidency in 1998, winning almost 90% of the popular vote. There was lots of boycotting from opposing parties, and only about 50% of the nation voted in the election.

== 2005 General Elections ==
Incumbent president Blaise Compaoré won the presidency in 2005, getting about 80% of the vote. There was opposition to him running again, due to an amendment to the Constitution of Burkina Faso passed in 2000 making two terms the maximum limit. However, Compaoré was able to run anyway because the amendment was passed during one of his terms, and thus could not apply until the next term.

== 2010 General Elections ==
Incumbent president Blaise Compaoré won the presidency in 2010. However, citizens of Burkina Faso began to speak out about the fraudulent system, and how Compaoré and his party was going to fix the vote for another landslide victory.

== 2015 General Elections ==
General elections were due to be held on 11 October 2015. However, on 16 September the now disbanded Regiment of Presidential Security (RSP) staged a coup d'état, and held the capital, Ouagadougou, for about a week. The protestors set the National Assembly building on fire and continued to riot in protest of election fraud. Following the Coup d'état, President Roch Marc Christian Kaboré won the election, in Burkina Faso's first peaceful and fair election with actual uncertainty of who was going to win the presidency in 50 years.

== 2020 General Elections ==
The incumbent president Roch Marc Christian Kaboré won the presidency and was re-elected in 2020. Following a number of recurring terrorist attacks by Islamic jihadist groups, particularly Jihadist Group to Support Islam and Muslims and the Islamic State. Kaboré ran for re-election on the promise of bringing peace to Burkina Faso, and ending the terrorist attacks plaguing the nation.

== 2022 Coup d'état ==
On January 24, 2022 Paul-Henri Sandaogo Damiba led a military insurgency to force out Kaboré. Damiba and fellow members of the coup were extremely dissatisfied with the way Kaboré had been handling the national bloody jihadist insurgency. He pledged to face the terrorism problem head on and meet it with the necessary firepower, something he and others felt was lacking in the past. Many people in Burkina Faso were pleased with the government overthrow, but some citizens felt that nothing would change. One man claimed that in 2014 when Compaoré was overthrown, the people of Burkina Faso were told everything would change, and all the problems were solved. However, many people of Burkina Faso felt that nothing truly changed, and there was a sentiment that this coup would result in yet another power shift without any substantial change. Ultimately, the nation's president has once again changed on violent terms, and Damiba currently is in power in Burkina Faso. The Sahel region is Africa has been a hotspot for coups recently, as there was a coup in Mali in 2020, and many believe it has to do with the border between Christianity and Islam and the recurrence of Islamic jihadism in that region.

== Electoral System ==
The 127 members of the National Assembly of Burkina Faso is elected by proportional representation. It consists of 45 multi-member constituencies; with each having about 2-9 seats. There is also an additional 16 seats that are elected proportionally nationwide. The presidential elections in Burkina Faso have two steps. First, after the initial round of votes are cast and counted, if one candidate is a majority winner, then that person is elected president of Burkina Faso. Otherwise, the two candidates with the highest number of votes move on to the final run-off round, where ultimately a president will be elected.

== See also ==
- Electoral calendar
- Electoral system
