= Union for Rebirth / Sankarist Party =

Political party in Burkina Faso

- Leader: Bénéwendé Stanislas Sankara
- Founded: 2000
- Dissolved: 2021
- Merged into: Union for Rebirth / Patriotic Sankarist Movement
- Ideology: Sankarism; Socialism
- Political position: Left-wing
- Slogan: "Avec le Peuple, Victoire!" ("With the People, Victory!")

Website
- Union pour la Renaissance / Mouvement Sankariste, UNIR/MS

The Union for Rebirth / Sankarist Party (French: Union pour la Renaissance / Parti Sankariste, UNIR / PS) was a political party in Burkina Faso.

== History ==
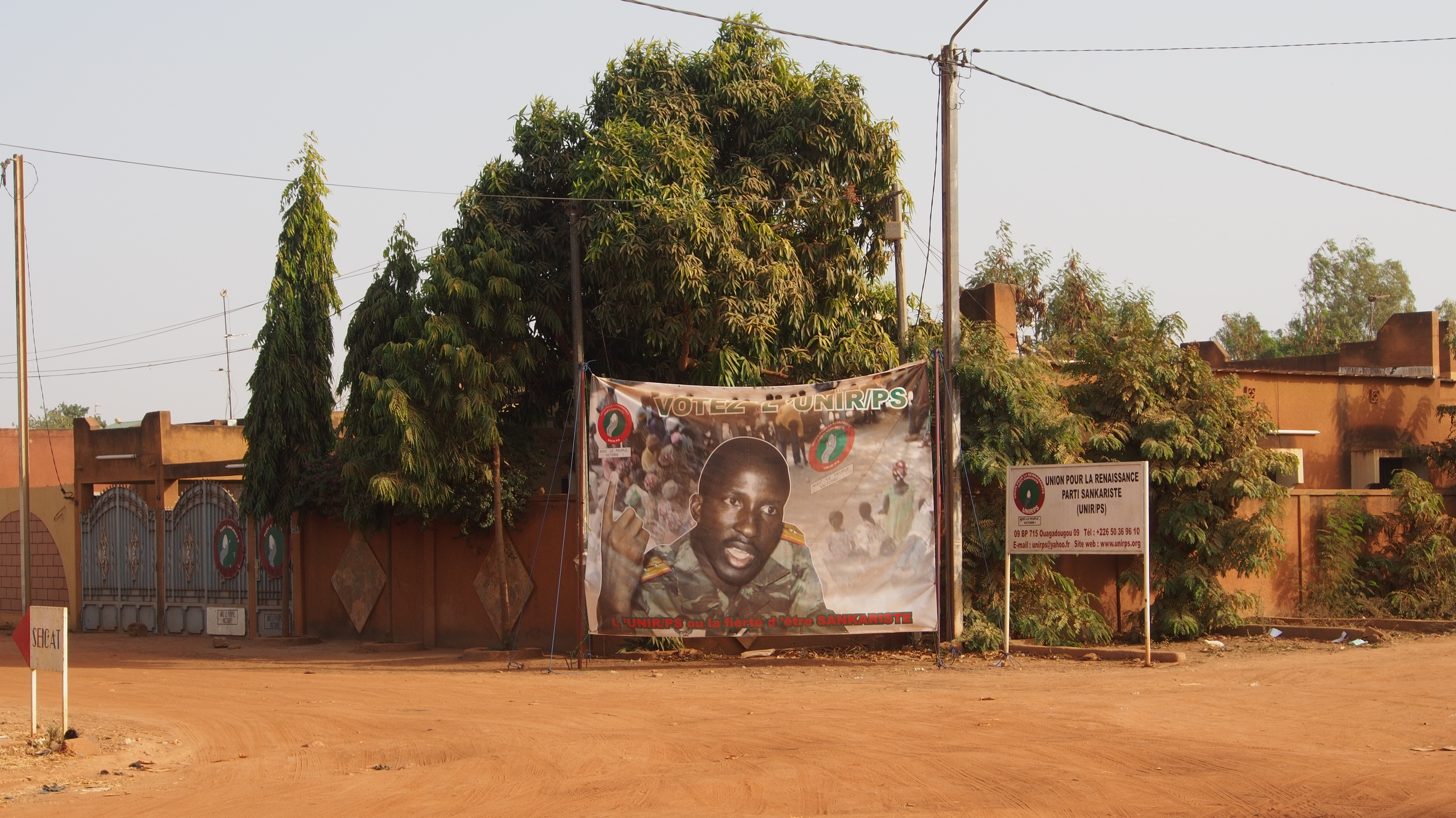
Headquarters of the UNIR/PS with a poster of Thomas Sankara.

The party was founded on 1 November 2000. Its president is lawyer Bénéwendé Stanislas Sankara, who bears no family relationship to the late President Thomas Sankara.

The name "Sankarist" party appears to be a reference to both President Sankara and the party's leader. The party subscribed to Sankarism.

At the legislative elections on 5 May 2002, the party won 2.4% of the popular vote and three out of 111 seats. In the presidential election of 13 November 2005, its candidate Bénéwendé Stanislas Sankara took second place with 4.88% of the popular vote. At the 2007 parliamentary elections, the party won four seats.

Political scientist Bettina Engels states that the UNIR/PS was among the opposition parties that participated in the 2014 uprising that ousted Blaise Compaoré, but that it "did not play a major role". The UNIR/PS went on to support the government of Roch Marc Christian Kaboré.

On 1 November 2021, it was announced that the party merged with the Mouvement Patriotique pour le Salut and other small Sankarist parties and organisations into a new party, the Union pour la Renaissance/ Mouvement patriotique sankariste (Union for Rebirth / Patriotic Sankarist Movement) or UNIR/MPS. Bénéwendé Sankara continued to lead this party until he was succeeded by interim president Augustin Loada in January 2023. All parties, including this one, were dissolved through decree by the junta government in Burkina Faso on 29 January 2026.

== Electoral history ==
=== National Assembly ===
Election year	# of overall votes	% of overall vote	# of overall seats won	+/–
2002	42,599	2.45 (#)	3 / 111	
2007	90,705	3.89 (#4)	4 / 111	▲1
2012	131,592	4.36 (#4)	4 / 111	Steady
2015	118,662	3.76 (#5)	5 / 150	▲1
2020	68,727	2.45 (#6)	5 / 150	Steady

== See also ==
- Union of Sankarist Parties
- Category:Union for Rebirth / Sankarist Party politicians
