= Philippe Ouédraogo (politician) =

Burkinabé politician

- Born: July 15, 1942 (age 84); Diapaga, Tapoa Province
- Occupation: Politician

Philippe Ouédraogo (born 15 July 1942) is a Burkinabé politician and the leader of the African Independence Party (PAI). He was born in Diapaga, Tapoa Province. Ouédraogo was Minister of Equipment and Telecommunication in the first government of Thomas Sankara, from 1983 to 1984. He then represented the Patriotic League for Development (Ligue patriotique pour le développement, LIPAD), which was the mass front of PAI. Ouédraogo continued to play an important role even after the break between LIPAD and Sankara, and was named chief engineer of mining.

Running as the Party for Democracy and Socialism (the electoral party of the PAI of Ouédraogo) candidate in the 13 November 2005 presidential election, Ouédraogo placed fourth out of 13 candidates, receiving 2.28% of the vote.
