= Party for Democracy and Socialism =

Party for Democracy and Socialism Parti pour la Démocratie et le Socialisme
- Registered: 2002
- Dissolved: 31 March 2012 (14 years, 163 days)
- Preceded by: African Independence Party
- Merged into: Party for Democracy and Socialism/Metba
- Ideology: Social democracy Democratic socialism
- Political position: Left-wing

The Party for Democracy and Socialism (French: Parti pour la Démocratie et le Socialisme) was a registered political party in Burkina Faso.

In 1999 the African Independence Party (PAI) split, and Soumane Touré formed a parallel PAI. Since the PAI led by Touré, which joined the government, obtained the legal recognition of the name PAI, the other PAI registered PDS as its electoral party in 2002.

At the legislative elections, 5 May 2002, PDS won 1.7% of the popular vote and 2 out of 111 seats. In the presidential election of 13 November 2005, its candidate Philippe Ouédraogo won 2.28% of the popular vote.

At the 2007 parliamentary elections, the party again won two seats.

In 2012 the party merged into Party for Democracy and Socialism/Metba.

== National conventions of PDS ==
- 5 March 2005: 1st National Convention
- 2 December 2006: 2nd National Convention
