= National Assembly (Burkina Faso) =

Unicameral legislature of Burkina Faso

National Assembly Assemblée nationale
- 7th National Assembly

Type
- Type: Unicameral

Leadership
- President: Ousmane Bougouma since 11 November 2022
- Seats: 127

Elections
- Voting system: Proportional representation
- Last election: 22 November 2020

Meeting place
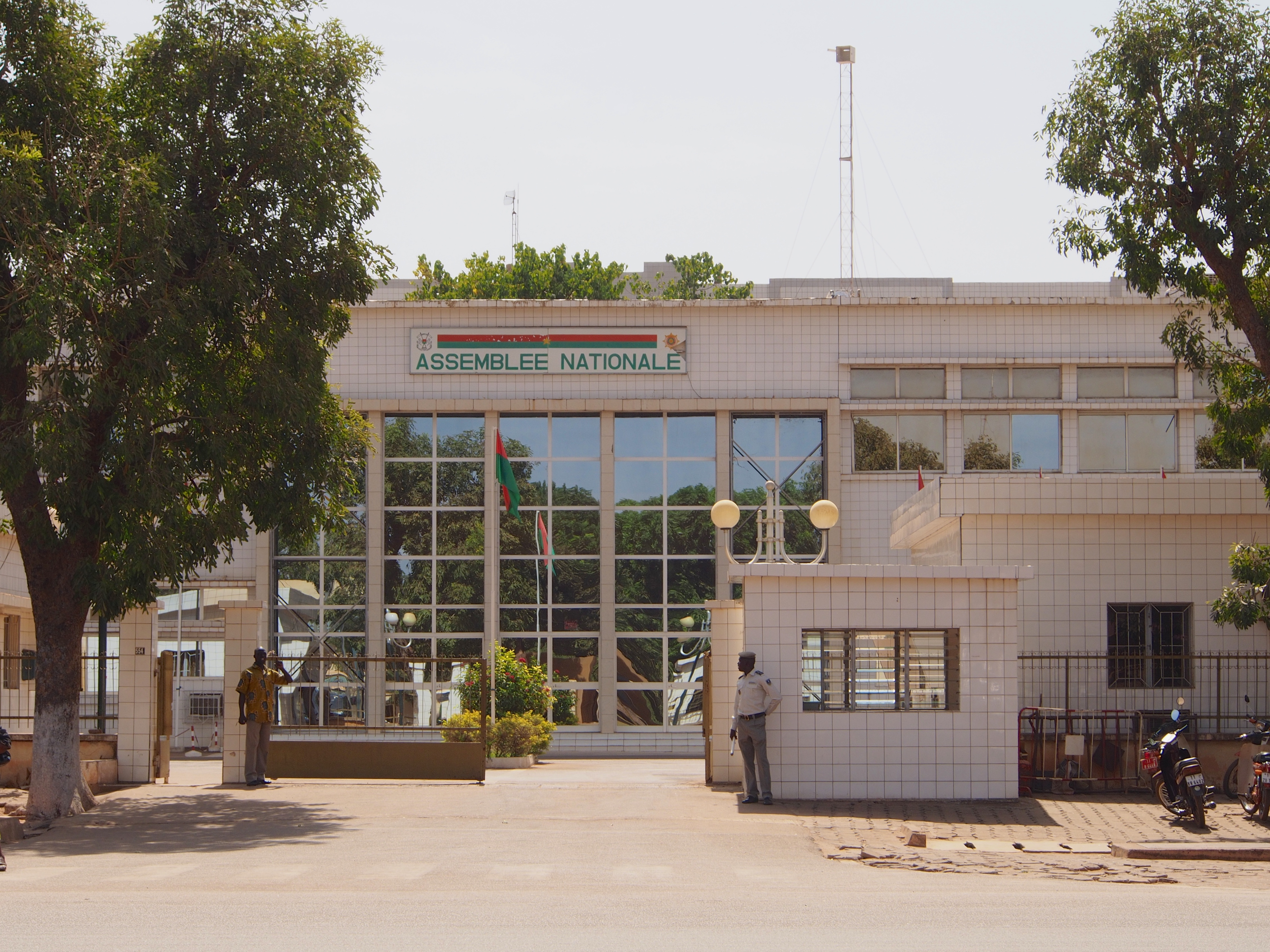
- Parliament Building, Ouagadougou

Website
- www.assembleenationale.bf

Constitution
- Constitution of Burkina Faso

The National Assembly (French: Assemblée nationale, lit. 'National Assembly') is the unicameral legislative body of Burkina Faso. In 1995, it became the lower house of a bicameral parliament, but the upper house (Chamber of Representatives) was abolished in 2002, though plans were made to restore the upper house under the new name of "Senate" in the June 2012 constitutional amendments; it was never executed due to an extended and unresolved political confrontation over the Senate's establishment, which left the country effectively with a unicameral legislature as of 2026.

On 30 October 2014, as part of the 2014 Burkinabé uprising, protesters stormed the parliament building and set fire to it in anger at the parliament's decision to amend the Constitution of Burkina Faso to abolish term limits, which would have effectively paved the way for President Blaise Compaoré to remain in office for another five-year term.

On 24 January 2022, during the January 2022 Burkinabé coup d'état, President Kaboré was detained and deposed by the military. After the announcement, the military declared that the parliament and government had been dissolved. In its place, a transitional legislative assembly was sworn in on 22 March 2022; it was later dissolved on 30 September after a coup d'état against interim President Paul-Henri Sandaogo Damiba. A new legislative assembly was sworn in on 11 November.

== Electing the National Assembly ==
Burkina Faso is divided into 45 electoral provinces within their 13 regions. Each province elects between two and nine representatives, and these representatives are members of political parties. There are 111 members of the National Assembly elected to represent provinces, and 16 nationally elected, totaling 127.

In Burkina Faso, the National Assembly is elected by a proportional representation system. Proportional representation in Burkina Faso means that each voter marks one party on the ballot, and after tallying the votes, the top parties chosen are elected to the Assembly. Each electoral province has a simple electoral quotient. This is the number of valid votes counted divided by the number of legislative seats available. If a party wins a seat by the electoral quotient, usually half of the votes, then the remainder of the seats are transferred to a "rest" category, which are compared to the other votes gathered. For example, in the province of Boulkiemde, the MPP (People's Movement for Progress) received 29,445 votes, which is 35.1% of the total votes of the province. Boulkiemde elects four representatives to their legislature, so their electoral quotient is 21002 votes (84007÷4). This means that the MPP will receive one seat from the electoral quotient. The remaining votes are transferred to another category, which is compared among the other candidates. These remaining votes in Boulkiemde won the MPP another seat in the legislature, since the remaining votes (8443) are the second highest compared to the rest of the parties (CDP=16968, UPC=8099). Thus, since the MPP received 35.1% of the votes, they received 50% of the seats due to the electoral quotient.

Elections are led by teachers in Burkina Faso, who are not allowed to be a member of any political party. The ballot has a name, acronym, or symbol of the party and a space for voters to mark. The ballots are placed in envelopes, and then placed in ballot boxes. The leader of the election officials ensures that the seal is not broken before counting all of the votes. The teachers who are trained as election officials become counting officials. Invalid ballots include those that have no marks, more than one mark, or ballots not in an envelope. The ballots are sent to the district level after counting them, where the winner of a legislative seat will be determined based on the number of votes. The districts are divided by one seat per 100,000 people, so the capital, Ouagadougou, has nine seats.

== 2015 National Assembly elections ==
In the 2015 parliamentary election, the People's Movement for Progress party received 51.3% of the national vote, winning 55 seats. The Union for Progress and Change (UPC) received 20.5% of the vote, which won them 33 seats. The Congress for Democracy and Progress party won 18 seats with 13.2% of the vote, and the New Alliance of Faso party received two seats, with 4.1% of the vote.

=== Results by electoral province: 111 seats ===
Electoral province	Total votes	Seats	Party	Votes	Proportion of vote	Party	Votes	Proportion of vote	Party	Votes	Proportion of vote	Party	Votes	Proportion of vote
Bale	41073	2	MPP	19371	0.471624	UPC	9812	0.238892						
BAM	63247	2	MPP	25934	0.410043	CDP	11145	0.176214						
Banwa	42014	2	MPP	19941	0.474628	Unir/PS	6268	0.149188						
Bazega	50346	2	MPP	17870	0.354944	UPC	11301	0.224467						
Bougouriba	18450	2	MPP	5694	0.308618	UPC	5445	0.295122						
Boulgou	127210	4	MPP	22695	0.178406	UPC (2)	67552	0.531027	CDP	8696	0.068359			
Boulkiemde	84007	4	MPP	29445	0.350507	CDP	16968	0.201983	UPC	8099	0.096409			
Comoe	69488	2	MPP	25270	0.36366	UPC	11242	0.161783						
Fada Gourma	58041	2	MPP	18357	0.316276	UPC	15554	0.267983						
Ganzourgou	69710	2	MPP (2)	52913	0.759045			0						
Gnagna	91655	3	MPP	29178	0.318346	UPC	27498	0.300016	NTD	10377	0.113218			
Houet	225085	6	MPP (2)	69802	0.310114	CDP	26360	0.117111	UPC	45534	0.202297	UNIR	9376	0.041655
Ioba	42233	2	MPP	12751	0.30192	UPC	14623	0.346246						
Kadiogo	617782	9	MPP (3)	213179	0.345072	UPC (2)	150492	0.2436	UNIR/PS	38896	0.062961	CDP	56143	0.090878
Kenedougou	53261	2	MPP	19093	0.35848	UPC	17611	0.330655						
Komondjari	20159	2	MPP	9462	0.469369	UPC	6862	0.340394						
Kossi	48419	2	MPP	15154	0.312976	UPC	9888	0.204217						
Kompienga	18401	2	CDP	5205	0.282865	UPC	6409	0.348296						
Koulpelogo	53070	2	MPP	18170	0.342378	UPC	13445	0.253345						
Kouritenga	77784	2	MPP	32552	0.418492	UPC	18014	0.23159						
Kourweogo	25441	2	MPP	7360	0.289297	CDP	4933	0.1939						
Leraba	27966	2	MPP	9355	0.334513	UPC	7818	0.279554						
Lorum	34287	2	MPP	9878	0.288098	MDA	11170	0.325779						
Mouhoun	51444	2	MPP	19909	0.387003	UPC	11099	0.215749						
Nahouri	44028	2	MPP	13832	0.314164	UPC	12941	0.293927						
Namentenga	56533	2	MPP	23028	0.407337	CDP	9969	0.176339						
Nayala	34643	2	MPP	15171	0.437924	CDP	7259	0.209537						
Noumbiel	14842	2	MPP	4924	0.331761	UPC	4193	0.282509						
Oubritenga	49117	2	MPP	11986	0.24403	CDP	26189	0.533196						
Oudalan	52303	2	MPP	16194	0.309619	UBN	15745	0.301034						
Passore	65708	3	MPP	18252	0.277774	CDP	10648	0.16205	UNIR/PS	17237	0.262327			
Poni	38461	2	MPP	10154	0.264008	UPC	11294	0.293648						
Sanguie	56181	2	MPP	14621	0.260248	NAFA	17605	0.313362						
Sanmatenga	112624	4	MPP	31442	0.279177	UPC	8755	0.077737	RDS	15794	0.140237	CDP	21013	0.186577
Seno	73007	2	MPP	17670	0.242032	PDS	28165	0.385785						
Sissili	39556	2	MPP	15118	0.382192	UPC	8600	0.217413						
Soum	79247	2	MPP	18583	0.234495	CDP	20752	0.261865						
Sourou	38569	2	MPP	10875	0.281962	CDP	9117	0.236382						
Tapoa	61826	2	MPP	28171	0.45565	UPC	19121	0.309271						
Tuy	36948	2	MPP	17322	0.468821	UPC	7018	0.189943						
Yagha	39735	2	MPP	12236	0.30794	NTD	8751	0.220234						
Yatenga	138773	4	MPP(2)	68883	0.496372	ADF-RDA	22692	0.163519	CDP	12807	0.092287			
Ziro	28638	2	MPP	10271	0.358649	LFA	7028	0.245408						
Zondoma	36902	2	MPP	21655	0.586825	CDP	6489	0.175844						
Zoundweogo	54207	2	CDP	13097	0.241611	UPC	26744	0.493368						

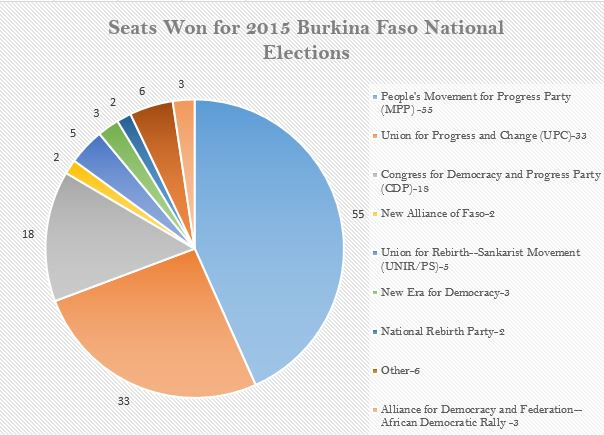
A pie chart showing how many seats won in the 2015 Burkina Faso National Assembly Elections. The "other" category includes 6 separate political parties.

=== National results: 16 seats ===
Political party	Number of votes	Number of seats	Proportion of vote
ADF-RDA	96,614	1	0.030577
CDP	417,058	2	0.131995
MPP	1,096,814	6	0.347131
NAFA	130,963	1	0.041449
NTD	70,374	1	0.022273
PAREN	59,421	1	0.018806
UNIR/PC	118,662	1	0.037555
UPC	648,784	3	0.205334

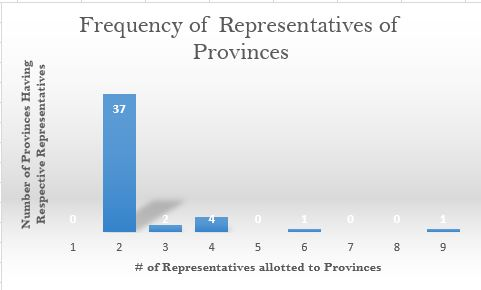
The frequency for the number of seats reserved for provinces. The majority of electoral provinces have two seats reserved, while few have more than two.

== See also ==
- List of presidents of the National Assembly of Burkina Faso
- Chamber of Representatives of Burkina Faso
- History of Burkina Faso
- Politics of Burkina Faso
