= List of Burkinabes =

This is a list of notable people from Burkina Faso, formerly French Upper Volta.

== Actors ==
- Philomaine Nanema, a.k.a. Philo, comedian and actress
- Roukiata Ouedraogo, playwright and actress

== Filmmakers ==
- Sarah Bouyain (born 1968), French-Burkinabé film director
- Gaston Kaboré (born 1951), film director
- Fanta Régina Nacro (born 1962), film director
- Idrissa Ouedraogo (born 1954), film and television director whose films include Yaaba (1989)
- Pierre Rouamba (1951–2023)

== Politicians ==
- Boureima Badini, Minister of Justice from 1999 to 2007
- Laurent Bado, member of the National Rebirth Party and 2005 Burkina Faso presidential candidate
- Ali Barraud, Minister of Public Health and Population for Upper Volta
- Djibril Bassolé (born 1957), Minister of Foreign Affairs and Regional Cooperation from June 2007
- Blaise Bassoleth (1920–1976), member of the French Senate from 1958 to 1959
- Juliette Bonkoungou (born 1954), Burkinabé ambassador to Canada
- Blaise Compaoré (born 1951), President of Burkina Faso from 1987
- Simon Compaoré (born 1952), Mayor of Ouagadougou
- Joseph Conombo (1917–2008), President of Upper Volta from 1978 to 1980
- Daniel Ouezzin Coulibaly (1909–1958), president of governing council of Upper Volta from 1957 to 1958
- Toubé Clément Dakio (born 1939), member of the Union for Democracy and Development party and 2005 Burkina Faso presidential candidate
- Noellie Marie Béatri Damiba (born 1951), journalist and diplomat
- Bernadette Sanou Dao (born 1952), Burkinabé Minister for Culture from 1986 to 1987
- Frédéric Guirma, politician, head of the RDA and 2001 Burkina Faso presidential candidate
- Emile Ilboudo, ambassador to Côte d'Ivoire
- Nayabtigungu Congo Kaboré (born 1948), leader of the Movement for Tolerance and Progress party and 2005 Burkina Faso presidential candidate
- Roch Marc Christian Kaboré (born 1957), President of the National Assembly of Burkina Faso
- Michel Kafando (born 1942), Burkinabé ambassador to the United Nations
- Joseph Ki-Zerbo (1922–2006), politician, historian, writer and activist
- Begnon-Damien Kone (1921/1922–1986), member of the French Senate from 1958 to 1959
- Lompolo Koné (1921–1974), Foreign Minister of Upper Volta from 1961 to 1966
- Yabre Juliette Kongo (born 1966), member of National Assemblu
- Zakalia Koté, Minister of Justice from 2007 to 2011
- Sangoulé Lamizana (1916–2005), President of Upper Volta from 1966 to 1980
- Ali Lankoandé, member of the Party for Democracy and Progress / Socialist Party and 2005 Burkina Faso presidential candidate
- Ablassé Ouedraogo, Regional Adviser for Africa within the African Development Bank and former foreign minister for Burkina Faso
- Gérard Kango Ouédraogo (1925–2014), Prime Minister for Upper Volta from 1971 to 1974
- Gilbert Noël Ouédraogo, member of the Pan-African Parliament
- Jean-Baptiste Ouédraogo (born 1942), President of Upper Volta from 1982 to 1983
- Kadré Désiré Ouedraogo (born 1953), Prime Minister of Burkina Faso from 1996 to 2000, Burkinabé ambassador to the United Kingdom
- Philippe Ouédraogo (born 1942), leader of the African Independence Party and 2005 Burkina Faso presidential candidate
- Ram Ouédraogo (born 1950), member of the Rally of the Democrats of Burkina party and 2005 Burkina Faso presidential candidate
- Youssouf Ouédraogo (born 1952), first Prime Minister of Burkina Faso, serving from 1992 to 1994
- Pargui Emile Paré, member of the People's Movement for Socialism/Federal Party and 2005 Burkina Faso presidential candidate
- Bouri Sanhouidi (born 1949), diplomat
- Bénéwendé Stanislas Sankara (born 1959), president of the Union for Rebirth / Sankarist Movement party and 2005 Burkina Faso presidential candidate
- Thomas Sankara (1949–1987), first President of Burkina Faso serving from 1984 to 1987, also president of Upper Volta from 1983 to 1984
- Thomas Sanon (born 1947), businessman, politician, diplomat
- Clément Sawadogo, Minister of the Civil Service, Labour and Social Security
- Marie Blandine Sawadogo, member of the Pan African Parliament
- Salimata Sawadogo (born 1958), Burkinabé ambassador to several African countries
- Laurent Sedego (born 1956), former military officer and cabinet member
- Nouhoun Sigue (1911–2004), member of the French Senate from 1948 to 1952
- Diongolo Traore (1914–1971), member of the French Senate from 1952 to 1958
- Hermann Yaméogo (born 1948), leader of the National Union for the Defence of Democracy party
- Maurice Yaméogo (1921–1993), first President of Upper Volta, serving from 1983 to 1984
- Salvador Yaméogo, Minister of Transportation and Tourism
- Oubkiri Marc Yao, member of the Pan African Parliament
- Larba Yarga, member of the Pan African Parliament
- Paramanga Ernest Yonli (born 1956), Prime Minister of Burkina Faso from 2000 to 2007
- Marlène Zebango, Minister for Youth and Sports from 1991 to 1993
- Saye Zerbo (1932–2013), President of Upper Volta from 1980 to 1982
- Tertius Zongo (born 1957), Prime Minister of Burkina Faso from June 2007
- Alain Zoubga (born 1953), medical doctor and leader of the Party for Democracy and Progress / Socialist Party

== Sportspeople ==
- Joris Bado (born 1991), basketball player
- Oumar Barro (born 1974), soccer player
- Tanguy Barro (born 1982), soccer player
- Abdoulaye Cissé (born 1983), soccer player
- Brahima Cissé (born 1976), soccer player
- Daouda Compaoré (born 1973), soccer player
- Henoc Conombo (born 1986), soccer player
- Amadou Coulibaly (born 1984), soccer player
- Moumouni Dagano (born 1981), soccer player
- Maxime D'Hoore (born 1978), soccer player
- Mohamed Ali Diallo, soccer player
- Salif Dianda (born 1987), soccer player
- Madou Dossama (born 1972), soccer player
- Ibrahim Gnanou (born 1986), former soccer player
- Jean-Michel Liade Gnonka (born 1980), soccer player
- Abdoul Aziz Kaboré (born 1994), soccer player
- Mohamed Kaboré (born 1980), soccer player
- Bèbè Kambou (born 1982), soccer player
- Pascal Karama (born 1993), soccer player
- Mahamoudou Kéré (born 1982), soccer player
- Nathanio Kompaoré (born 2001), soccer player
- Yssouf Koné (born 1982), soccer player
- Brahima Korbeogo (born 1975), soccer player
- Pierre Koulibaly (born 1986), soccer player
- Moustapha Kourouma (born 1977), soccer player
- Dieudonné Minoungou (born 1981), soccer player
- Toussaint Natama (born 1982), soccer player
- Abdoul-Aziz Nikiema (born 1985), soccer player
- Amara Ahmed Ouattara (born 1983), soccer player
- Boureima Ouattara (born 1984), soccer player
- Dango Ouattara (born 2002), soccer player
- Moussa Ouattara (born 1981), soccer player
- Ali Ouédraogo (born 1976), soccer player
- Rabaki Jérémie Ouédraogo (born 1973), road racing cyclist
- Rahim Ouédraogo (born 1980), soccer player
- Saïdou Panandétiguiri (born 1984), soccer player
- Jonathan Pitroipa (born 1986), soccer player
- Florent Rouamba (born 1986), soccer player
- Firmin Sanou (born 1973), soccer player
- Idrissa Sanou (born 1977), sprinter
- Olivier Sanou (born 1975), high jumper and triple jumper
- Abroubagui Salbre (born 1993), soccer player
- Ousmane Sanou (born 1978), soccer player
- Wilfried Sanou (born 1984), soccer player
- Cheick Sanou (born 1992), strongman
- Abdoulaye Soulama (born 1974), soccer player
- Amadou Tidiane Tall (born 1975), soccer player
- Mamadou Tall (born 1982), soccer player
- Edmond Tapsoba (born 1999), soccer player
- Soumaila Tassembedo (born 1983), soccer player
- Amadou Touré (born 1979), soccer player
- Alain Traoré (born 1988), soccer player
- Bertrand Traoré (born 1995), soccer player
- Lamine Traoré (born 1982), soccer player
- Ousmane Traoré (born 1977), soccer player
- Seydou Traoré (born 1970), soccer player
- Narcisse Yaméogo (born 1980), soccer player
- Franck Zio (born 1971), long jumper
- Issa Zongo (born 1980), soccer player
- Mamadou Zongo (born 1980), soccer player
- Patrick Zoundi (born 1982), soccer player

== Writers ==
See: List of Burkinabé writers

== Others ==
- Georgie Badiel, model, beauty queen, activist and author
- Fatouma Bintou Djibo, United Nations representative in Niger
- Marie Odile Bonkoungou-Balima, former Minister for Education and ambassador to Germany
- Minata Samaté Cessouma, diplomat
- Chantal Compaoré, wife of Burkinabé President Blaise Compaoré
- Gabin Dabiré, musician
- Christine Kafando, HIV/AIDS activist
- Diébédo Francis Kéré, architect and founding principal of Kéré Architecture
- Bil Aka Kora, musician
- Mogho Naba, King of the Mossi people
- Philippe Ouédraogo (cardinal)
- Aminata Savadogo, singer
- Yennenga, legendary African princess, mother of the Mossi people
- Henri Zongo (died 1989), military officer involved in the 1987 coup d'état in Burkina Faso
- Ousmane Zongo (1960–2003), arts trader killed by American police officers in New York City
- Lassina Zerbo, Executive Secretary of the Comprehensive Nuclear-Test-Ban Treaty Organization (CTBTO)
- Hamidou Toure, mathematician who has played a significant role in the development of mathematics programs in Burkina Faso, from the pre-school level to university level.

== See also ==
- Lists of people by nationality – similar lists for other countries
- List of Burkina Faso-related topics
