= Mossi people =

Ethnic group of Burkina Faso

Mossi
Mooaga
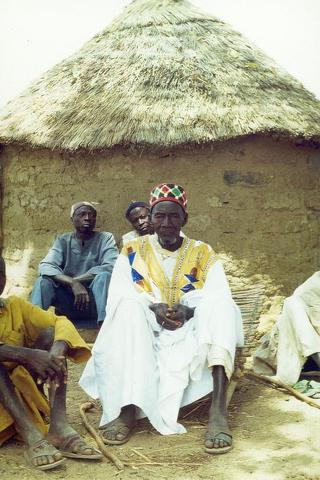
- A Mossi Naaba (leader)

Total population
- Burkina Faso 11,118,983 (52%); 1.2 million Cote d'Ivoire; 160,140 in Ghana; 89,582 in Mali (0.4%)

Regions with significant populations
- Primarily Burkina Faso northern Ivory Coast and northern Ghana

Languages
- Mooré; African French

Religion
- Islam 65%, Christianity 15%, Traditional 20%

Related ethnic groups
- Mamprusi people, Gurunsi people, Dagomba people, Gurma people and other Gur peoples

- Person: Moaaga
- People: Mosse
- Language: Mòoré
- Country: Moogho

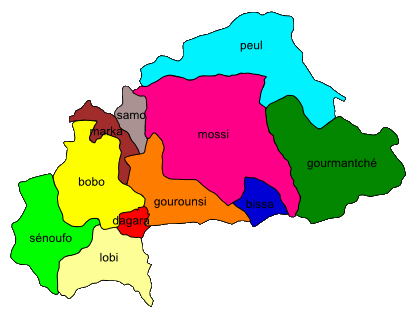
An ethnic map of Burkina Faso. The Mossi primarily live in the pink area.

The Mossi people or the Mossis are a Gur ethnic group native to modern Burkina Faso, primarily the Volta River basin. The Mossi are the largest ethnic group in Burkina Faso, constituting 52% of the population, or about 11.1 million people in 2010. The other 48% of Burkina Faso's population is composed of more than 60 ethnic groups, mainly the Gurunsi, Gurma, Senufo, Lobi, Bobo, Bissa and Fulani. The Mossi speak the Mòoré language.

== History ==
The Mossi people originated in Burkina Faso, although significant numbers of Mossi live in neighboring countries, including Benin, Côte d'Ivoire, Ghana, Mali, and Togo. In 2022, the estimated population of Burkina Faso was 20M+, over 11M of whom were Mossi. Another 2 million Mossi live in Côte d'Ivoire.

=== Origins ===
According to oral tradition, the Mossi come from the marriage of a Mamprusi/Dagomba princess, Yennenga, and a Mandé hunter.

Yennenga was a warrior princess, daughter of a king, Naa Gbewaa, of present-day northern Ghana. Gbewaa's tomb is located in Pusiga in the Upper East Region of Ghana. The story has it that while exploring her kingdom on horseback, she lost her way and was rescued by Rialé, a solitary Mandé hunter. They got married and gave birth to a son, Ouedraogo, who is recognised as the father of Mossi people.

=== Mossi Empire ===
Though Mossi records exist, primarily written using the Ajami script, the Mossi people's history has largely been kept by oral tradition. This means it is impossible to assign precise origin dates. Historians assign the beginning of their existence as a state to the 11th century. The Mossi were able to conquer a vast amount of territory thanks to their mastering of the horse, created a prosperous empire, and kept peace in the region until the Mossi Kingdoms were conquered by the French. The expansion of the Mossi empire was stopped in the 19th century with the initiation of intensive colonisation by the French.

=== Colonial era ===
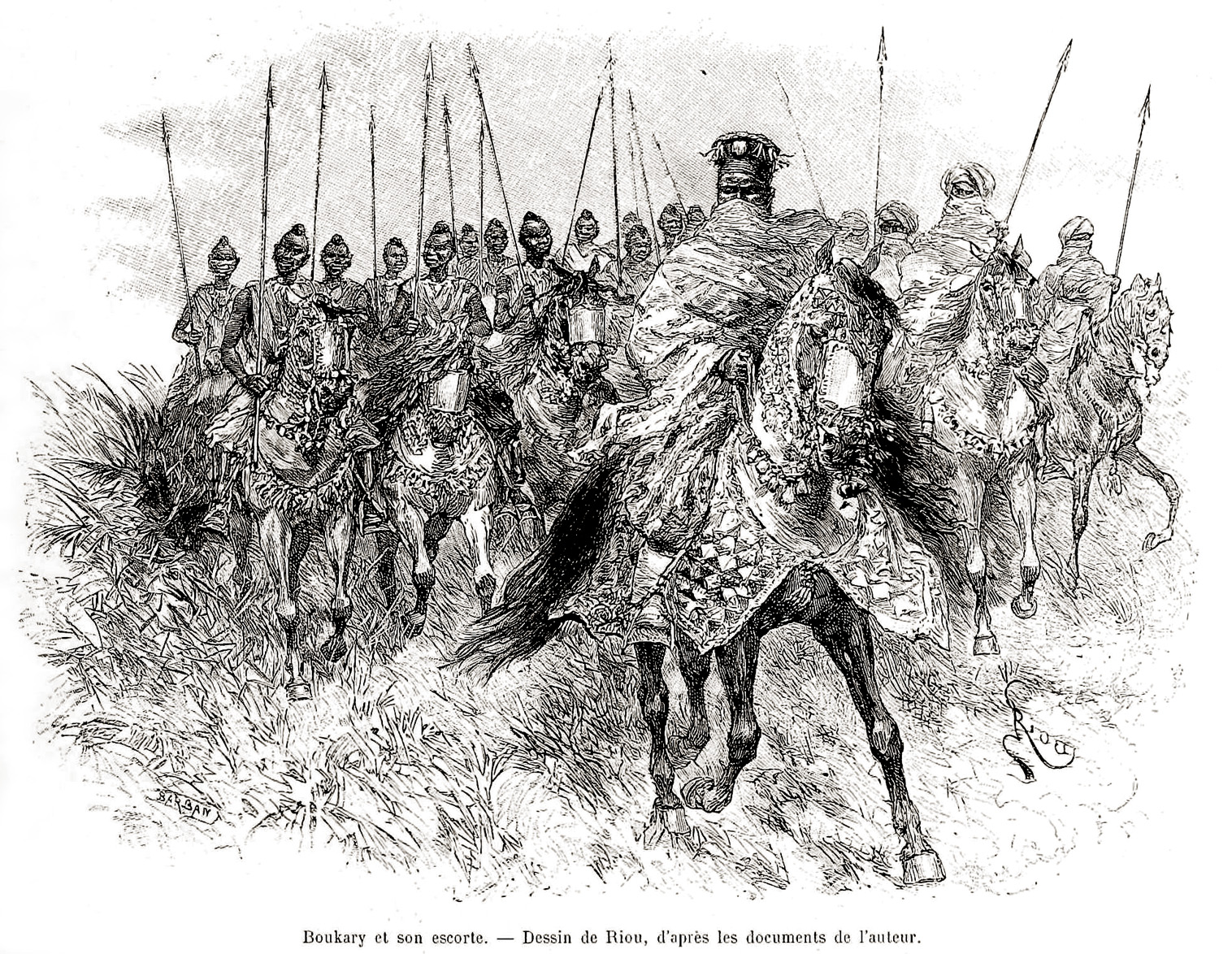
The fast-moving Mossi cavalry once dominated large areas of what is now Burkina Faso

French rule affected Mossi society and weakened the power of the Mossi emperor, the Mogho Naaba. Despite colonization, the Mogho Naaba was given some authority over the Mossi during the French colonial period. He is consulted today for crucial decisions, especially those affecting the destiny of society. Two great events have affected the status of the Mogho Naaba during colonization:

- During the initial phase of the French invasion, he retired to the Mamprusi kingdom with which the Mossi have always kept brotherly relations.
- In 1896, the Mogho Naaba accepted the French protectorate.

The Mossi and several other peoples played a significant role in France's military during World War II. They constituted part of the corps in the military troops of French West Africa, known in French as the Tirailleurs Sénégalais.

== Organization of Mossi society ==
The Mossi people have organised their society in an original hierarchic process in which family and state are the key elements. The Mossi people are very heterogeneous. When horsemen invaded from the south they created a political or ruling class, called Nakomse (sing. Nakoambga), and a spiritual class called Tengabisi. All chiefs come from the ruling class. The Tengabisi include Saya (smiths), Nyonyose (farmers), Yarse (weavers and merchants), and others.

The origins of the Nyonyose are diverse: In the north their ancestors were Dogon and Kurumba, in the southwest their ancestors were Lela, Nuna, Sisala and others, and in the far east they were Gurmantche. These people were united into a new ethnicity called Mossi in about 1500.

It is a mistake to describe a "Nyonyosé tribe" or the "art of the Nyonyosé" because the Nyonyose do not exist outside Mossi society. All Nyonyosé are Mossi. At the same time, it is a mistake to assume that all segments of Mossi society are culturally identical, for the differences between the Nakomsé and the Tengabisi are striking; only the Tengabisi use masks, and only the Nakomsé use figures in the context of political celebrations.

=== Mogho Naaba and the Nakomse ===
The highest position in Mossi society is that of the Mogho Naaba, who is given executive power. The Mogho Naaba's role is to rule the entire population and to protect the kingdom. Today, he lives in Ouagadougou, the historical capital of the Mossi Empire and present capital of Burkina Faso. Though the political dynamic of the country has changed, the Mogho Naaba is recognised by his people and has substantial authority.

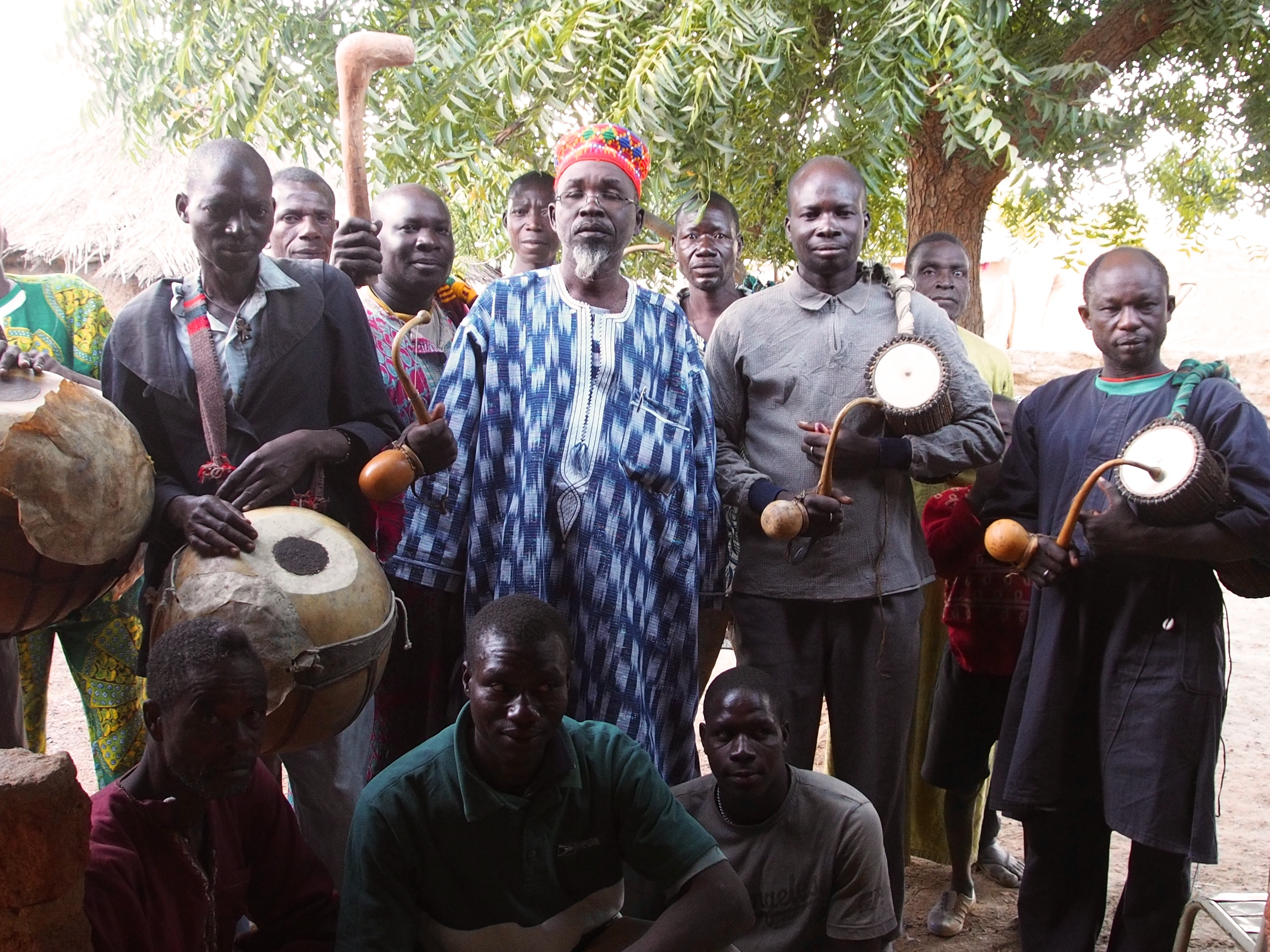
Naaba Zomb Wobgo, Andemtenga

Second to the Mogho Naaba come the nobles, Nakomse (“people of power”; sing. Nakoambga), who all are from the family of the Mogho Naaba, whether they be brothers, sisters, cousins, or otherwise. All dignitaries come from the Mogho Naaba's family. The Nakomse are often assigned territories in the kingdom as governorships and rule in the name of the Mogho Naaba. As in the past, the Mogho Naaba needs the support of the “ancient ones”, his Nyon-nyonse (or gnon-gnon-sse) subjects to fully exercise his power. The Nyon-nyonse are the peoples who lived in Mossi-controlled regions before the Mossi.

The Nakomse are descended from the horsemen who conquered the peoples on the Mossi plateau. All Mossi Napa's (kings) come exclusively from the Nakomse class. They use figures as political art to validate their rule over the peoples they conquered.

=== The Tengabisi ===
The descendants of the ancient farming peoples who had occupied the land from the beginning of time and who, by right of first occupation, were and are the owners of the land are called the Tengabisi (“people of the earth”). The Tengabisi can be further divided into groups of smiths (Saya), groups of traders (Yarse) and groups of farmers (Nyonyose). Generally the smiths and the traders do not use masks, but the Nyonyose are the principal makers and users of masks in Mossi society.

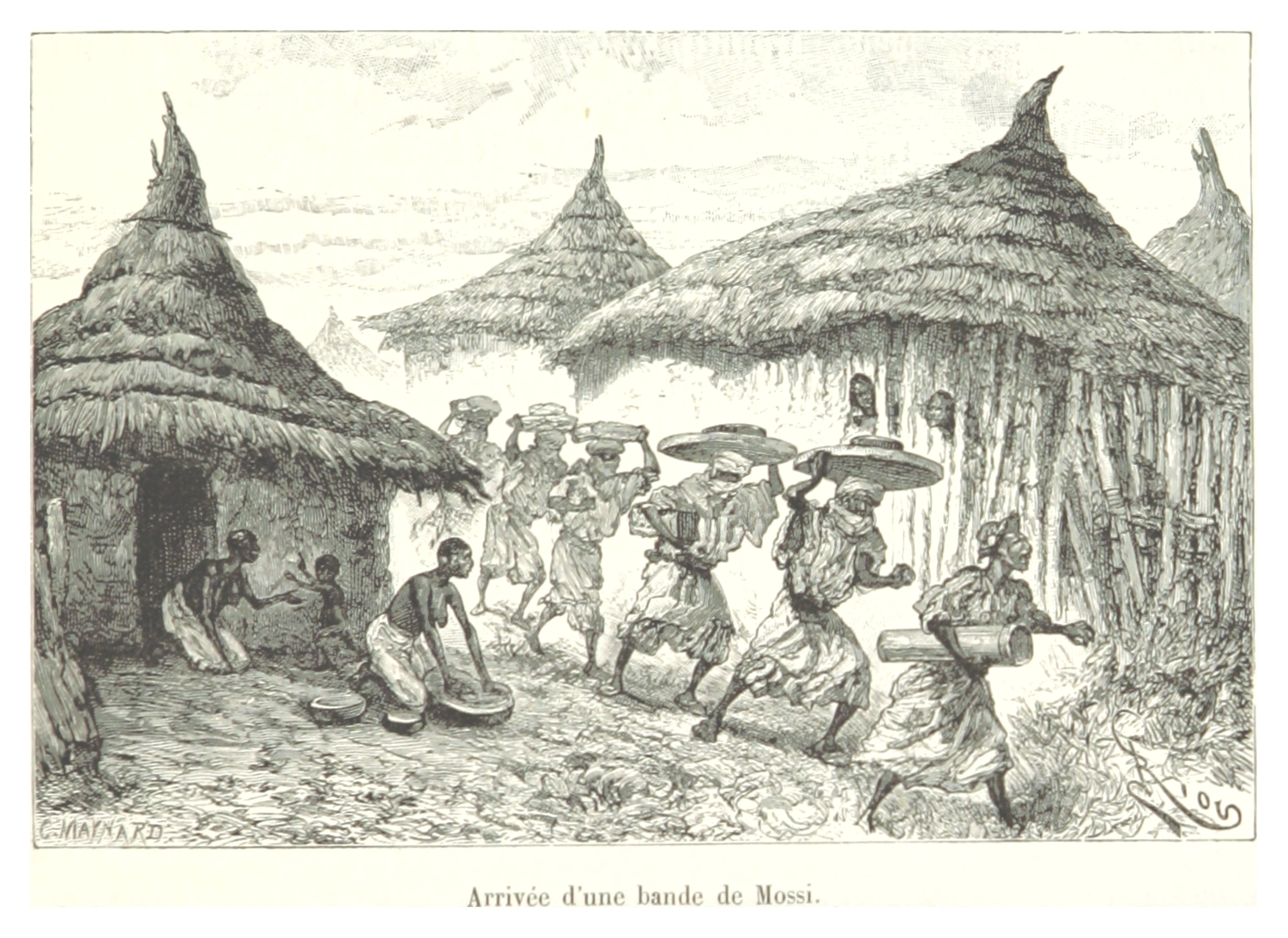
Arrival of a band of Mossi, 1892

Craftsmen and ordinary citizens constitute the larger part of the population and are all subjects of the emperor. These two groups are generally fused but have internal subdivisions, each one having its own ruling family that performs ceremonies and other important events. Mossi people often identify with groups; hence, at all levels, there is a hierarchy in Mossi society. In everyday life, the family hierarchy is most important, and family is often directly associated with the notion of hierarchy for the Mossi.

=== International perspectives on Mossi society ===
'Mogonaba' was what Leo Frobenius was told was the appropriate term for the emperor of Mossi at Wagadugu when he visited the country in 1904–6. His is one of the few disinterested reports as he was an anthropologist and not a missionary, representative of a European company, or military. He describes a court much like a European one (he may have an anti-aristocratic bias) with nobles in intrigues over commerce, power and industry.

This report alone caused disbelief in Europe as no European source had ever considered Africans to be socially like Europeans. The lack of racism in Frobenius' report and his discovery of an industrious people and what some would describe as a glorious past interested W.E.B. Du Bois in Frobenius' other writings on Africa. Rudolf Blind's translation in English of the Voice of Africa, published by Hutchinson & Co., produced some racist comments he thought necessary to conform with English sensitivities — otherwise he believed no Englishman would consider the book realistic.

An important contribution was made in the 1960s by the historian Elliott P. Skinner, who wrote at length about the sophistication of Mossi political systems in The Mossi of the Upper Volta: The Political Development of a Sudanese People. This was at a time when many African countries were gaining independence, and Skinner strongly made the point that African peoples were very clearly qualified to govern themselves.

== Language and cultural values ==
Group identity and values within the Mossi and contrasted against other ethnic groups are tied first and foremost to language.

=== Mossi language ===
The Mossi speak the Mooré language, of the Western Oti-Volta group of languages, northwestern sub-group. It is spoken in Burkina Faso, Ghana, and Ivory Coast. This language group is part of a larger grouping, Gur languages belonging to the Niger–Congo family. In the language there are a few dialects based mainly on region. For example, there is a dialect spoken in Yatenga (Ouahigouya), another distinct dialect in the northern region, a third in the southeast in Koupela, different from a fourth dialect in the same region called Tenkodogo. Despite these regional differences, the dialects are mutually intelligible.

=== Cultural values ===
According to the explanations of Marie Tapsoba, the former Cultural Counsellor at Burkina Embassy in Senegal and Mossi herself, Mossi culture can be divided into four main values characteristic of the ethnic group.

==== Attitude towards ancestors ====
Ancestors are believed to have reached a better world from which they can influence life on earth. They can help or punish their descendants depending on their behavior. Ancestors are also the judges that have the power to allow a descendant to enter the "pantheon of the ancestors". If an ancestor chooses to deny entrance, the soul of the disavowed one is condemned to run at random for all eternity. Because of these beliefs, Mossi swear by their ancestors or by the land; when they do so (which only occurs in extreme situations), it is more than symbolic — it is a call to imminent justice.

==== Land ====
Land is related to the ancestors, being a path by which one can access the ancestors. Even today, this notion gives a unique value to land in Mossi thought. Land is considered to be much more than simple dust and has a spiritual dimension to it. A Mossi's life depends on their land, and it is essential for the family settlement.

==== Family ====
Family is an essential cultural element of the Mossi, who hold collectivism in high regard. Individualism does not exist in traditional Mossi culture: one's actions and behaviors are always taken to be characteristics of one's family. They must always ask an elder in order to do something. As a result, all are expected to act in their family's name; thus, the family is the smallest entity in the Mossi society. Heritage is patrilineal, passed down from a father to his sons. However, when a man has no sons, women can inherit from their husbands and even from their father.

==== Hierarchy ====
Hierarchy is a fundamental concept for the Mossi and pervasive in their culture. The family is organised like a kingdom with its king — the husband and father, his advisor — the wife, and the people — the children. Aunts and uncles play a role by helping in the education and raising of children.

== Traditional and cultural holidays and events ==
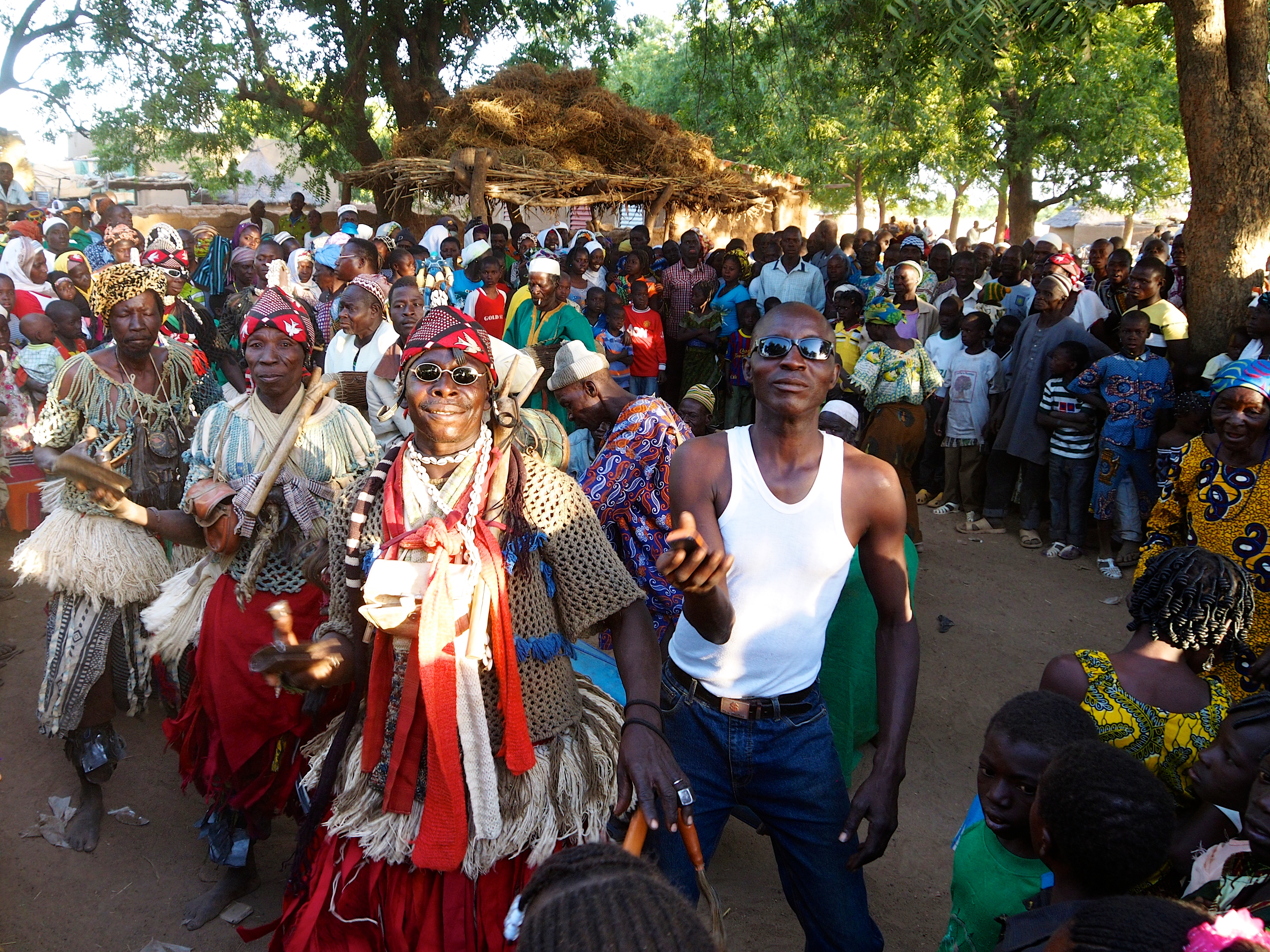
The dance company of Andemtenga in action during the Nakoobo ceremony of the Mossi chief Naaba Zomb Wobgo at Andemtenga, province Kouritenga, Burkina Faso

Ceremonies and celebrations pace the life of Mossi people, with each celebration having its particulars. Through them the community expresses joy or suffering, or simply fulfills duties to the memory of the ancestors.

=== Mogho Naaba court ===
The Friday Mogho Naaba court ceremony derives from an event when the Moro Naba's sister fled north to the land of Yadega, the kingdom called Yatenga. As she fled north, she carried all of the amulets of power, or nam, with her. The Moro Naba had to decide whether to follow her and retrieve his sacred power objects or to remain behind to rule over his people. Three times he left his palace to mount a white horse, and three times he returned to the palace. In the end he did not pursue his sister, and to this day the kings of Yatenga claim that they hold the power of Mossi rule.

The political segment of Mossi society, the Nakomse (sing. Nakoambga), use art to validate their rule. Bridles, saddles, stirrups and other objects associated with the horse are very important. In addition, Mossi chiefs use carved wooden figures to represent their royal ancestors. These figures are displayed each year at royal festivals called na possum, when the heads of each household in the community reaffirm their allegiance and loyalty to the chief.

=== Mossi Masks ===
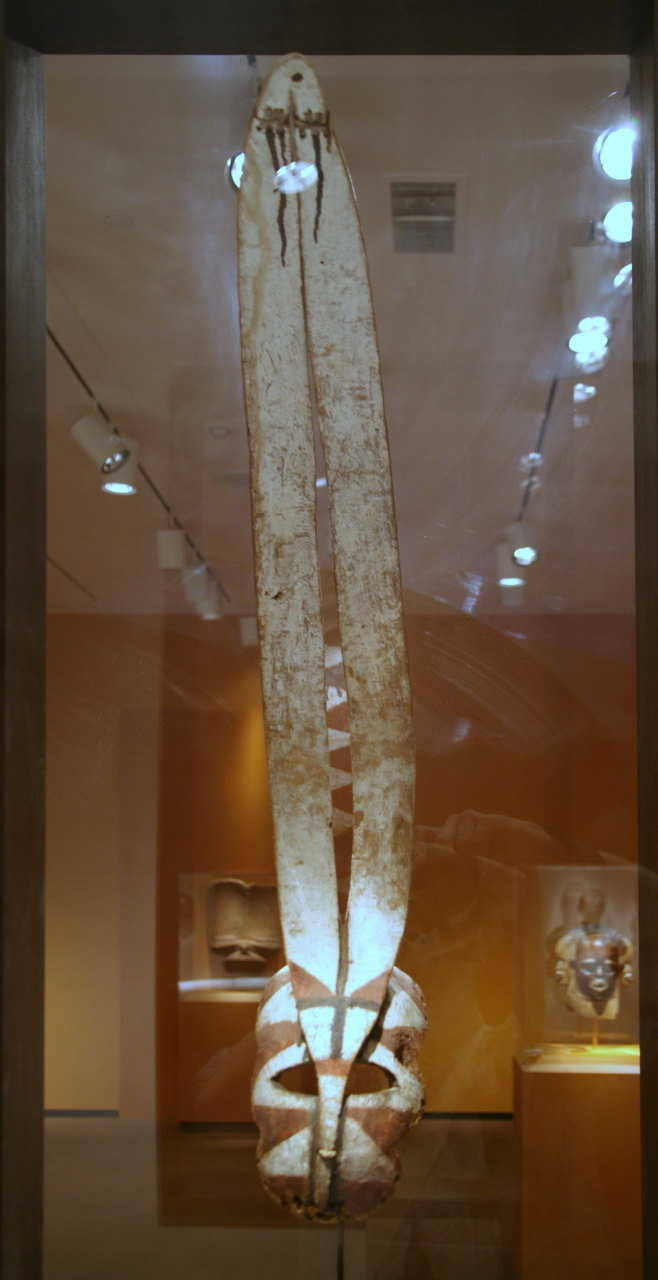
A Mossi Mask

The Nyonyose (the ancient farmers and spiritual segment of Mossi society) use masks in their religious observances and rituals. The Nakomse (chief class) do not use masks. Masks in initiations and funerals is typical of all the Voltaic or Gur-speaking peoples, including the Nyonyose, Lela, Winiama, Nouna, Bwaba, and Dogon. Masks appear at burials to observe on behalf of the ancestors that proper procedures are carried out. They appear at funeral or memorial services held at regular intervals over the few years after an elder has died. Masks attend to honor the deceased and to verify that the spirit of the deceased merits admission into the world of ancestors. Without a proper funeral, the spirit remains near the home and causes trouble for his/her descendants.

Masks are carved of the wood of the Ceiba pentandra, the faux kapokier. They are carved in three major styles that correspond to the styles of the ancient people who were conquered in 1500 by the invading Nakomse and integrated into a new Mossi society:

- In the north masks are vertical planks with a round concave or convex face.
- In the southwest masks represent animals such as antelope, bush buffalo, and strange creatures, and are painted red, white and black.
- In the east, around Boulsa, masks have tall posts above the face to which fiber is attached.

Female masks have two pairs of round mirrors for eyes; small masks, representing Yali ("the child") have two vertical horns. All Nyonyose masks are worn with thick costumes made of the fiber of the wild hemp, Hibiscus cannabinus. In the old days only the northern Nyonyose in Yatenga and Kaya, and the eastern people around Boulsa allowed their masks to be photographed. The people in the southwest forbade photography because it did not conform to the yaaba soore, the path of the ancestors.

Mask characters include Balinga, the Fulani woman; katre, the hyena; nyaka, the small antelope; Wan pelega, the large antelope, and many others. Masks from all three areas appear at annual public festivals such as International Art & Craft Fair (Salon international de l’Artisanat de Ouagadougou or SIAO), Week of the Culture, and the Atypical Nights of Koudougou (Les Nuits Atypiques de Koudougou). Each Nyonyose family has its own mask, and they are charged with protecting the masks to this day. Masks are very sacred and are a link to the spirits of ancestors and of nature.

=== Mossi Dolls ===
Mossi dolls (raog'biga or rad'kaba) are small wooden figures. They are cylindrical and typically lack arms or legs. They depict female humans with pendulous breasts and semicircular heads. Some dolls are carved to include braided hair, scars, or genitals. Some are decorated with beads, pearls, shells, fabric, metal earrings, pieces of bone, or animal hide.

Distinct doll styles originate in different geographical regions and from different makers. Dolls' varying traits include the size, shape, and placement of the head; the length of the neck, the shape of the breasts, and the shape of the torso. Mossi dolls are often made by smiths, who can produce them in large quantities.

The appearance of a Mossie doll may reveal things about its owners. Some dolls are manufactured out of found objects like sticks, millet stalk, cardboard, or corncob. Mothers sometimes purchase dolls for their daughters, who decorate them with leather, cowries, and beads.

A 1964 report describes how young girls played with Mossi dolls. They often referred to their dolls as "child" (biiga), washed them, dressed them, carried them on their backs, tucked them into their skirts or waistbands, imitating a mothers' treatment of her babies. They brought their dolls to important festival events, and anyone who held the doll for a moment was expected to give the child a few cowries upon returning it. A girl's doll was placed in a hut after her excision ceremony and given to her younger sister on her wedding night. The doll was considered each girl's first child.

Mossi dolls were also involved in Mossi religious beliefs. Damage to a Mossi doll warranted consultation with a diviner, and so Mossi dolls were handled carefully. Mossi dolls were also believed to aid contraception. Newly married Mossi women often took dolls to their new husbands' compounds, which they believed would allow them to become pregnant soon after marriage. It was also said that if a childless married woman carried a highly ornamented Mossi doll wherever she went, her wish for a child was often granted. Women continued giving their dolls attention and care even after giving birth. A 1973 report claims that a woman's lavish treatment of her Mossi doll was seen as a message to the ancestors of her patriclan or to spirits with the ability to increase women's fertility. However, the Mossi have denied this claim.

== Notable Mossi people ==
- Dez Altino, Burkinabé musicia
- Habib Bamogo, Burkinabé footballer
- Jean Claude Bamogo, Burkinabé m
- Blaise Bassoleth, Burkinabe politician
- Pingdwinde Beleme, Burkinabé footballer
- Sana Bob, Burkinabé musician
- Innocent Bologo, Burkinabé sprinter
- Juliette Bonkoungou, Burkinabé ambassador
- Bassirou Compaoré, Burkinabé footballer
- Blaise Compaoré, former President of Burkina Faso from 1987 to 2014
- Issouf Compaoré, Burkinabé musician
- Raïssa Compaore, Burkinabé journalist
- Simon Compaoré, Burkinabé politician
- Simporé Simone Compaoré, Burkinabé playwright
- Aminata Sana Congo, Burkinabé politician
- Ernest Aboubacar Congo, Burkinabé footballer
- Noellie Marie béatri Damiba, Burkinabé journalist
- Issoufou Dayo, Burkinabé footballer
- Moumouni Fabré, Burkinabé politician
- Floby, Burkinabé musician
- Pierre Claver Ilboudo, Burkinabé writer
- Aline Koala Kaboré, Burkinabé diplomat
- Charles Kaboré, Burkinabé footballer
- Gaston Kaboré, Burkinabé film director
- Idrissa Kabore, Burkinabé boxer
- Issa Kaboré, Burkinabé footballer
- Karim Kaboré, Burkinabé cyclist
- Mohamed Kaboré, Burkinabé footballer
- Omar Kaboré, Burkinabé footballer
- Pierre Landry Kaboré, Burkinabé footballer
- Rahiza Kaboré, Bukinabé designer
- Roch Marc Christian Kaboré, former President of Burkina Faso
- Salimata Kaboré, Burkinabé painter
- Zinda Kaboré, Burkinabé politician
- Michel Kafando, former President of Burkina Faso
- Bébè Kambou, Burkinabé footballer
- Ismaël Karambiri, Burkinabé footballer
- Kayawoto, Burkinabé musician
- Marthe Koala, Burkinabé athlete
- Eddie Komboïgo, Burkinabé politician
- Arzouma Aime Kompaoré, Burkinabé screenwriter
- Nathanio Kompaoré, Burkinabé footballer
- Cheick Kongo, French mixed martial artist
- Brahima Korbeogo, Burkinabé footballer
- Jean-Baptiste Kiéthéga, Burkinabé archeologist
- Ismaël Koudou, Burkinabé footballer
- Imilo Lechanceux, Ivorian-Burkinabé musician
- Hubert Maga, former President of Benin
- Frére Malkhom, Burkinabé musician
- Kamou Malo, Burkinabé football coach
- Patrick Malo, Burkinabé footballer
- Alif Naaba, Burkinabé musician
- Mogho Naaba, Paramount chief of the Mossi people
- Supreme Nabiga, Burkinabé musician
- Préjuce Nakoulma, Burkinabé footballer
- Elisabeth Nikiema, Burkinabé swimmer
- Jacqueline Marie Zaba Nikiéma, Burkinabé diplomat
- Mamounata Nikiéma, Burkinabé producer
- Suzy Henrique Nikiéma, Burkinabé writer
- Boubacar Nimi, Burkinabé footballer
- Xavier Niodogo, Burkinabé diplomat
- Kollin Noaga, Burkinabé novelist
- Salif Nogo, Burkinabé footballer
- Ablassé Ouedraogo, Burkinabé economist
- Adama Ouedraogo, Burkinabé swimmer
- Adama Ouédraogo, Burkinabé actor
- Alassane Ouédraogo, Burkinabé footballer
- Alice Ouédraogo, Burkinabé lawyer
- Ambroise Ouédraogo, Burkinabé Roman Catholic Archbishop of Maradi
- Angéle Bassolé-Ouédraogo, Canadian poet
- Angelika Ouedraogo, Burkinabé swimmer
- Antoinette Ouédraogo, Burkinabé lawyer
- Assita Ouédraogo, Burkinabé actress
- Bassirou Ouédraogo
- Bachir Ismaël Ouédraogo, Burkinabé politician
- Claire Ouedraogo, Burkinabé nun and activist
- Dim-Dolobsom Ouédraogo, Burkinabé intellectual
- Élodie Ouédraogo, Belgian sprinter
- Fulgence Ouedraogo, French rugby union player
- Gérard Kango Ouédraogo, Burkinabé statesman
- Gilbert Noël Ouédraogo, Burkinabé politician
- Hamado Ouedraogo, Burkinabé footballer
- Idrissa Ouédraogo, Burkinabé filmmaker
- Ismahila Ouédraogo, Burkinabé footballer
- Issa Ouédraogo, Burkinabé javelin thrower
- Issiaka Ouédraogo, Burkinabé footballer
- Jean-Baptiste Ouédraogo, former president of Burkina Faso
- Jean-Bernard Ouédraogo, Burkinabe sociologist
- Joseph Ouédraogo, Burkinabé politician
- Joséphine Ouédraogo, Burkinabé sociologist
- Kadré Désiré Ouédraogo, former Prime Minister of Burkina Faso
- Kassoum Ouédraogo, former Burkinabé footballer
- Louckmane Ouédraogo, Burkinabé footballer
- Mahamadou Lamine Ouédraogo, Burkinabé author
- Mamadou Ouedraogo, Burkinabé swimmer
- Mamadou Ouédraogo, Burkinabé politician
- Marie Françoise Ouedraogo, Burkinabé mathematician
- Noufou Ouédraogo, Burkinabé actor
- Ouamdégré Ouedraogo, Burkinabé playwright
- Paul Yemboaro Ouédraogo, Burkinabé archbishop
- Peggy Ouedraogo, Burkinabé journalist
- Philippe Ouédraogo, Burkinabé politician
- Philippe Ouédraogo, Burkinabé cardinal
- Rabaki Jérémie Ouédraogo, Burkinabé cyclist
- Ram Ouédraogo, Burkinabé politician
- Rasmané Ouédraogo Burkinabé cyclist
- Rasmané Ouédraogo, Burkinabé actor
- Robert Ouédraogo, Burkinabé priest and musician
- Roukiata Ouedraogo, Burkinabé playwright
- Samuel Ouedraogo, Burkinabé basketball player
- Sibidou Ouédraogo, Burkinabé actor
- Tahirou Tasséré Ouédraogo, Burkinabé film director
- Youssouf Ouédraogo, former Prime Minister of Burkina Faso
- Hanatou Ouelogo, Burkinabé judoka
- Titinga Frédéric Pacéré, Burkinabé writer
- Saïdou Panandétiguiri, Burkinabé footballer
- Pargui Emile Paré, Burkinabé politician
- Issouf Paro, Burkinabé footballer
- Clément Pitroipa, Burkinabé footballer
- Jonathan Pitroipa, Burkinabé footballer
- Romaric Pitroipa, Burkinabé footballer
- Stéphane Pognongo, Burkinabé footballer
- Florent Rouamba, Burkinabé footballer
- Alimata Salembéré, Burkinabé film administrator
- bénéwendé Stanislas Sankara, Burkinabé politician
- Odile Sankara, Burkinabé actress
- Robert Sankara, Burkinabé footballer
- Thomas Sankara, former President of Burkina Faso from 1983 to 1987
- Aboubacar Sawadogo, Burkinabé footballer
- Bienvenu Sawadogo, Burkinabé sprinter
- Clément Sawadogo, Burkinabé politician
- Etienne Sawadogo, Burkinabé novelist
- Faysal Sawadogo, Burkinabé athlete
- Habibou Sawadogo, Burkinabé musician
- Isaka Sawadogo, Burkinabé actor
- Salimata Sawadogo Burkinabé ambassador
- Samira Sawadogo, Burkinabé actress
- Siméon Sawadogo, Burkinabé politician
- Souleymane Sawadogo, Burkinabé footballer
- Tindwende Sawadogo, Burkinabé swimmer
- Yacouba Sawadogo, pioneer of 'zai' farming technique and winner of numerous international environmental awards
- Moussa Savadogo, Malian sprinter
- Moussa Savadogo, Burkinabé playwright
- Laurent Sedego, Burkinabé politician
- Saran Sérémé, Burkinabé politician
- Saïdou Simporé, Burkinabé footballer
- Salimata Simporé, Burkinabé footballer
- Sofiano, Burkinabé musician
- Joey le Soldat, Burkinabé musician
- Issouf Sosso, Burkinabé footballer
- Abdoul Tapsoba, Burkinabé footballer
- Edmond Tapsoba, Burkinabé footballer
- Iréne Tassembédo, Burkinabé dancer
- Soumaila Tassembedo, Burkinabé footballer
- Bamos Théo, Burkinabé musician
- Issaka Thiombiano, Burkinabé cinematographer
- Ilias Tiendrébéogo, Burkinabé footballer
- Iréne Tiendrébéogo, Burkinabé athlete
- Wendy, Burkinabé musician
- Steeve Yago, Burkinabé footballer
- Blaise Yaméogo, Burkinabé footballer
- Blandine Yaméogo, Burkinabé actress
- Hamidou Yaméogo, Burkinabé cyclist
- Hermann Yaméogo, Burkinabé politician
- Herve Yaméogo, Burkinabé basketball player
- Jacques Yaméogo, Burkinabé football manager
- Maurice Yaméogo, former President of Burkina Faso from 1960 to 1966
- Narcisse Yaméogo, Burkinabé footballer
- Saint Pierre Yaméogo, Burkinabé film director
- Salvador Yaméogo, Burkinabé politician
- Moussa Yedan, Burkinabé footballer
- Rene Jacob Yougbara, Burkinabé swimmer
- Alexandre Yougbare, Burkinabé sprinter
- Anne Zagré, Belgian sprinter
- Arthur Zagré, Burkinabé footballer
- Pingrénoma Zagré, Burkinabé military chief of staff
- Hugues Fabrice Zango, Burkinabé athlete
- Mamadou Zaré, Ivorian football manager
- Zêdess, Burkinabé musician
- Yacouba Isaac Zida, Burkinabé military officer
- Djibril Zidnaba, Burkinabé footballer
- Ernest Zongo, Burkinabé cyclist
- Henri Zongo, Burkinabé politician
- Jonathan Zongo, Burkinabé footballer
- Mamadou Zongo, Burkinabé footballer
- Moïse Zongo, Burkinabé footballer
- Norbert Zongo, Burkinabé journalist
- Tertius Zongo, former Prime Minister of Burkina Faso
- Wilfried Balima
- Abdoul-Aziz Nikiema
- Nasser Djiga
- Ousseni Bouda
- Dramane Salou
- Victor Nikiema
- John Pelu

== See also ==
- Mossi Kingdoms
- Mooré language
