= Ouedraogo (surname) =

Ouédraogo, sometimes Ouedraogo, is a surname taken from the French spelling of Wedraogo, semi-legendary son of princess Yennenga and founder of the Mossi Kingdoms (in modern-day Burkina Faso).

The surname may refer to:

- Abdul Moustapha Ouedraogo (born 1988), Ivorian footballer
- Ablassé Ouedraogo (born 1953), Burkinabé economist and politician
- Adama Ouedraogo (born 1987), Burkinabé swimmer
- Alassane Ouédraogo (born 1980), Burkinabé footballer
- Ali Ouédraogo (born 1976), Burkinabé footballer
- Alice Ouédraogo (born 1955), Burkinabé lawyer and public health official
- Ambroise Ouédraogo (born 1948), Nigerian Roman Catholic bishop
- Angèle Bassolé-Ouédraogo (born 1967), Canadian poet and journalist
- Angelika Ouedraogo (born 1993), Burkinabé swimmer
- Antoinette Ouédraogo, Burkinabé lawyer
- Assan Ouédraogo (born 2006), German footballer
- Élodie Ouédraogo (born 1981), Belgian sprinter
- Farid Ouédraogo (born 1996), Burkinabé footballer
- Fulgence Ouedraogo (born 1986), French rugby union player
- Gérard Kango Ouédraogo (born 1925), Burkinabé politician and Prime Minister of Burkina Faso
- Gilbert Noël Ouédraogo (born 1968), Burkinabé politician
- Hamado Ouedraogo (born 1983), Burkinabé footballer
- Hermann Ouédraogo (born 1981), Burkinabé footballer
- Idrissa Ouedraogo (1954–2018), Burkinabé film director
- Ismaël Ouedraogo (born 1991), Burkinabé footballer
- Ismahila Ouédraogo (born 1999), Burkinabé footballer
- Issiaka Ouédraogo (born 1988), Burkinabé footballer
- Jean-Baptiste Ouédraogo (born 1942), Burkinabé physician and President of Burkina Faso
- Joseph Ouédraogo, Burkinabé politician
- Joséphine Ouédraogo (born 1949), Burkinabé sociologist and politician
- Kadré Désiré Ouedraogo (born 1953), Burkinabé politician and Prime Minister of Burkina Faso
- Kassoum Ouédraogo (born 1966), Burkinabé footballer
- Latif Ouedraogo (born 2007), Burkinabe footballer
- Mamadou Ouédraogo (1906–1978), Burkinabé politician
- Marie Françoise Ouedraogo (born 1967), Burkinabé mathematician
- Philippe Ouédraogo (cardinal) (born 1945), cardinal from Burkina Faso
- Philippe Ouédraogo (politician) (born 1942), politician from Burkina Faso
- Rabaki Jérémie Ouédraogo (born 1973), Burkinabé cyclist
- Rahim Ouédraogo (born 1980), Burkinabé footballer
- Ram Ouédraogo (born 1950), Burkinabé politician
- Samuel Ouedraogo (born 1987), Burkinabé basketball player
- Youssouf Ouédraogo (1952–2017), Burkinabé politician and Prime Minister of Burkina Faso
