= Hialeah shooting =

Two mass shootings have occurred in Hialeah, Florida:

- 2013 Hialeah shooting, in which 6 people were killed in an apartment complex
- 2021 Hialeah shooting, in which 3 people were killed and 20 others were injured in a club shooting outside a banquet hall
