= Bouri =

Bouri may refer to:

== People ==
- Bouri Sanhouidi (born 1949), Burkina Faso diplomat and economist
- Fatma Bouri (born 1993), Tunisian handball player for Club Africain and the Tunisian national team
- Wahbi al-Bouri (1916–2010), Libyan politician, diplomat, writer and translator

== Places ==
- Bouri, Diabo, Burkina Faso (fr)
- Bouri, Sissy, Burkina Faso (fr)
- Bouri, Cameroon (fr)
- Bouri Field, Libya
- Bouri Formation, Ethiopia
