= November 1946 French legislative election in Ivory Coast =

Elections to the French National Assembly was held in the territory of Ivory Coast (which included Upper Volta at the time) on 10 November 1946 as part of the wider parliamentary elections. Félix Houphouët-Boigny, Zinda Kaboré and Daniel Ouezzin Coulibaly were elected on the African Democratic Rally list.

== Results ==
Party	Votes	%	Seats
African Democratic Rally	125,752	100.00	3
Total	125,752	100.00	3
Valid votes	125,752	98.50	
Invalid/blank votes	1,918	1.50	
Total votes	127,670	100.00	
Registered voters/turnout	187,904	67.94	
Source: French National Assembly, Thompson & Adloff
