= 2013 Hialeah shooting =

Mass shooting in Florida, U.S.

- Location of Hialeah within Florida.
- Location: 25.86428°N 80.3109°W; 1485 West 46th Street, Hialeah, Florida, U.S.
- Date: July 26–27, 2013 c. 6:30 p.m. – c. 2:30 a.m.
- Attack type: Mass murder, massacre, arson, shootout, mass shooting
- Weapon: Glock 17 Gen 4 semi-automatic pistol
- Deaths: 7 (including the perpetrator)
- Injuries: 0
- Perpetrator: Pedro Alberto Vargas
- Motive: Unknown

On July 26, 2013, a mass shooting occurred at the Todel Apartments, an apartment complex in Hialeah, a city in Miami-Dade County, Florida, United States. Seven people, including the shooter, were killed in the incident. The shooter was identified by police as 42-year-old Pedro Alberto Vargas, a resident of Hialeah, who, after setting his apartment ablaze, opened fire from his balcony and inside the apartment, then held two people hostage before being fatally shot by a SWAT team in the early hours of July 27.

== Events ==
=== Prior to the shooting ===
At 1:37 p.m., hours before the shooting started, Vargas called 9-1-1 and reported he was being followed, asking the dispatcher to run the license plate of a vehicle parked outside his apartment. He also claimed he was being threatened by people using witchcraft on him. His mother, 83-year-old Esperanza Patterson, then took the phone and told the dispatcher about her son's strange behavior. The dispatcher informed Patterson that police units have been sent to her residence, but Patterson advised against it, and later informed the dispatcher that Vargas had left, having gone to the office of a lawyer he hired for a recent legal matter.

=== Shooting ===
According to officials, Vargas poured combustible liquid on $10,000 in cash and set it on fire in his apartment unit at around 6:30 p.m. The Todel Apartments' manager, 79-year-old Italo Pisciotti, and his 69-year-old wife Samira noticed the smoke and ran to the apartment. Vargas stepped into the hallway and opened fire with a Glock 17 9mm semiautomatic pistol, killing both. He proceeded to go to his balcony on the fourth floor of the building and fired 10 to 20 bullets into the street, fatally hitting 33-year-old Carlos Gavilanes as he got out of his car.

Vargas then kicked open the door of apartment 304, where he shot and killed the residents, 64-year-old Patricio Simono, his 51-year-old wife Merly Niebels, and their 17-year-old daughter Priscilla Perez. Police officers responded to the scene and exchanged gunfire with Vargas throughout the complex's stairwells for about five hours.

Vargas then entered apartment 525, where he took the residents, Zoeb and Farida Nek, hostage for about three hours. During the standoff, he continued firing shots at officers outside. After negotiations reportedly broke down, authorities decided to send in a six-officer SWAT team to rescue the hostages. The team entered the building and found the two hostages praying in the living room, while Vargas was pacing around out of their view. Officers outside distracted Vargas with a stun grenade, allowing the SWAT team to rescue the hostages and open fire on Vargas, who they gunned down after a brief shootout. Both hostages escaped unharmed. Two fully loaded magazines were found at the scene.

The event was the deadliest mass shooting in Hialeah's history, as well as the deadliest in the entire Miami area in three decades.

==== Victims ====
- Italo Pisciotti, 79 (building manager, killed in a hallway)
- Samira Pisciotti, 69 (wife of Italo Pisciotti, killed in a hallway)
- Carlos Javier Gavilanes, 33 (killed on the street)
- Patricio Simono, 64 (killed in apartment 304)
- Merly S. Niebles, 51 (wife of Patricio Simono, killed in apartment 304)
- Priscilla Perez, 17 (daughter of Merly Niebles and stepdaughter of Patricio Simon, killed in apartment 304)

== Perpetrator ==
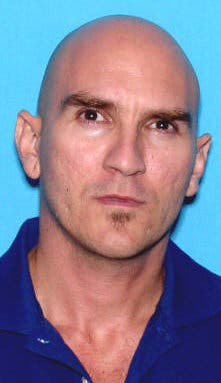
Pedro Alberto Vargas

Pedro Alberto Vargas (October 3, 1970 – July 27, 2013), a Cuban native, was identified as the shooter. He was born in Havana to teacher parents. His father died in 1991 or 1992. Vargas studied at the University of Pedagogical Sciences between 1990 and 1994, graduating with a bachelor's degree in technical education.

He and his mother, Esperanza Patterson, immigrated to the U.S. in the mid-1990s after winning U.S. visa lotteries, and Vargas was naturalized in 2004. According to records, he resided in apartment 408 with Patterson since 1999 and had committed no serious criminal offenses. He took classes at Miami Dade College, graduating in 2004 with an associate degree in graphic design.

Neighbors described Vargas as a quiet man who commonly got into arguments with his mother in their apartment. According to several LA Fitness customers, Vargas frequented the local gym and often lifted weights as a way to channel out pent-up anger. He also used steroids, which he later blamed for his hair loss, and expressed frustration at bad experiences with women. The Glock 9mm pistol used in the shooting was legally purchased by Vargas in October 2010 from Florida Gun Center, a local gun shop, and he had a concealed carry permit for it.

=== Professional problems ===
He worked at the media services department at Miami Dade College's North Campus starting in 2004, and although his initial performance evaluations judged him positively, they began noting a lack of social skills. Vargas was eventually forced to resign in 2008 after the school found he downloaded inappropriate files, including a computer hacking tutorial from The Anarchist Cookbook. Several months afterward, Miami Dade College received anonymous online threats that were traced to a public library in Hialeah, though Vargas was suspected of being the sender. Vargas later found employment at a Miami company as a graphic designer, but was fired after three months. Like Miami Dade College, the company later received anonymous threats and Vargas was suspected, but not confirmed as the sender.

Prior to the shooting, Vargas had been working as a graphic design artist for Bullet Line, a promotional company, from May to October 2012. A week following his dismissal from the company, he began sending "abusive emails and text messages" to Bullet Line. Regarding these messages, he began seeing an attorney, Angel Castillo, Jr. Vargas initially denied sending the messages but later admitted to being the sender after being informed by the lawyer that he was possibly committing perjury. On the day of the shooting, after making the 9-1-1 call, Vargas had gone to Castillo's office and demanded to see him, only to learn he was not there at the time. According to a relative of his mother, Vargas feared losing his money due to the case.

== Reaction ==
Following the incident, Mayor Carlos Hernández responded, "I'm torn apart. We've never had something so complex as we had last night.... It's an extremely sad day in Hialeah." In the wake of the shooting, some citizens of Hialeah took to Twitter to express their concerns about safety in the city.

On July 28, 2013, Sandy Hook Promise, a nonprofit organization that was formed in the wake of the Sandy Hook Elementary School shooting, issued a statement about the shooting, saying, "Our hearts are broken. Our spirit is not. Sending prayers and condolences to the victims and families of the Hialeah, Florida mass shooting."

== See also ==
- 2021 Hialeah shooting
- List of rampage killers in the United States
- Carol City murders
