= Ajavon =

Ajavon is a surname. Notable people with the surname include:

- Matee Ajavon (born 1986), American basketball player
- Robert Ajavon (1910–1996), Togolese politician
