= Ministry of Justice (Burkina Faso) =

The Ministry of Justice, Human Rights and Civic Promotion, Keeper of the Seals of Burkina Faso is responsible for the following:

- Justice (organization of the judicial system, independence of the judiciary, litigation management or law enforcement),
- Human rights (international and national legal aspects, education, promotion and defense techniques, judicial protection), Democracy (legal framework, judicial aspects, promotion activities),
- Fight against corruption (International and national legal aspects, prevention and control techniques, link with transnational organized crime),
- Public procurement (legislative and regulatory framework, litigation management, education),
- Elections (legislative and regulatory framework, litigation management),
- Decentralization (legislative and regulatory framework, education, litigation management).

== List of ministers (Post-1960 when the country achieved independence) ==
- Moussa Kargougou (1962-1964)
- Denis Yameogo (1965)
- Bagnamou Bonde (1966-1970)*
- Malick Zorome (1971-1974)*
- Sangoule Lamizana (1974)*
- Bagnamou Bonde (1975)*
- Francois Xavier Zonco (1976-1978)*
- Moise Lankoande (1979-1980)*
- Bema Ouatarra (1981-1982)*
- Marie Louise Nignan-Bassolet (1982-1983)* [1st female]
- Raymond Poda (1984)*
- Blaise Compaore (1985-1987)
- Salif Sampebogo (1988-1989)
- Antoine Komy Sambo (1990-1991)
- Benoit Lompo (1992)
- Timothee Some (1993-1994)
- Larba Yarga (1995-1999)
- Boureima Badini (1999-2007)
- Zakalia Koté (2007-2011)
- Jerome Traoré (2011-2012)
- Dramane Yaméogo (2012-2014)
- Joséphine Ouédraogo (2014-2016)
- Bessolé René Bagoro (2016–present)

*The country was known as Upper Volta until 1984 when it was renamed Burkina Faso.

== See also ==
- Justice ministry
- Politics of Burkina Faso
