= Marie Louise Nignan-Bassolet =

Burkinabe politician

Marie Louise Nignan-Bassolet is a Burkinabé politician.

She served as Minister of Justice in 1982–1983. She was the first woman Minister of Justice in Burkina Faso.
