= Chérif Sy =

Burkinabé politician (born 1960)

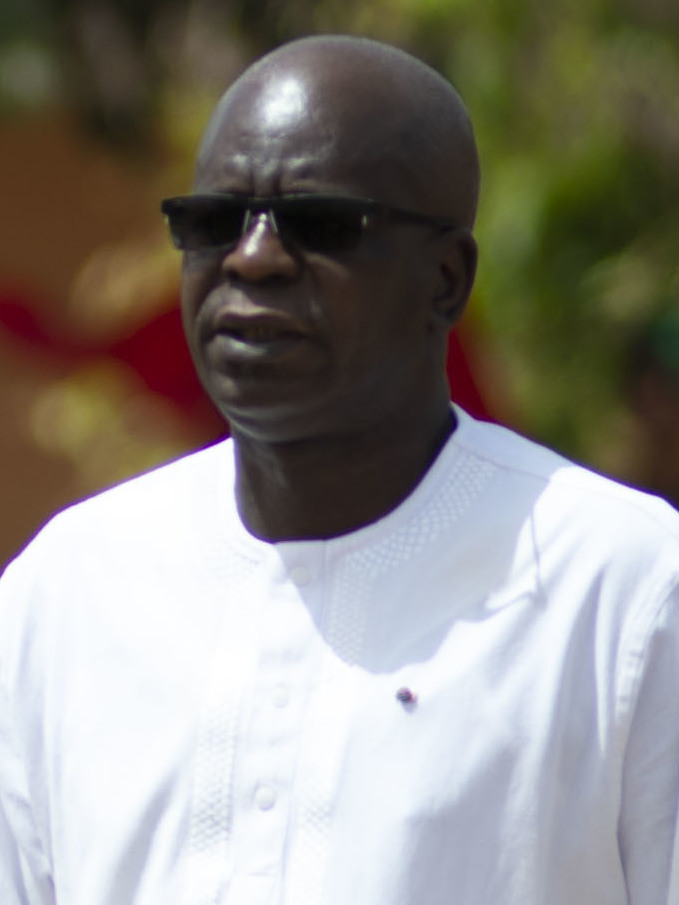
- Sy in 2019

President of the National Transitional Council of Burkina Faso
- In office 27 November 2014 – 30 December 2015
- Preceded by: Soungalo Ouattara (as President of the National Assembly)
- Succeeded by: Salif Diallo (as President of the National Assembly)

President of Burkina Faso Acting
- In office 17 September 2015 – 23 September 2015
- Preceded by: Michel Kafando (Transitional)
- Succeeded by: Michel Kafando (Transitional)

Personal details
- Born: 17 May 1960 (age 65) Néma, Mauritania

Chérif Moumina Sy (born 17 May 1960) is a Mauritanian-born Burkinabé politician who served as the transitional Head of Parliament from 2014 to 2015.

== Biography ==
=== Journalism career ===
Sy is the son of army general Baba Sy, who participated in the 1983 revolution that brought Thomas Sankara to power. Sankara was killed in 1987, during the coup that brought Blaise Compaoré to power. The younger Sy moved to Paris and headed the Committee for Defense of the Revolution. During this time, Sy was a journalist and founded and edited the Sankarist newspaper Bendre. In March 2013, he was re-elected chief of the Society of Editors of the Private Press.

=== President of the National Transitional Council ===
Sy played an important role in the popular demonstrations that deposed Compaoré in 2014. Michel Kafando was chosen as president in November 2014 by a panel of 23 officials, over Joséphine Ouédraogo and Sy. He became President of the National Transitional Council of Burkina Faso on 27 November. He defeated his main challenger, Ibrahim Koné by a 71 to 14 vote. In this role, Sy passed a range of reforms, such as revoking the death penalty, which had been used against journalists, including his friend Norbert Zongo. Sy also sponsored a law on the right of access to information. His most controversial law amended the electoral code, preventing former officials from the Compaoré regime from running in elections. A subsequent coup attempt cited this law as one of their foremost objections to the existing government.

=== Countering 2015 coup attempt and aftermath ===
He was acting president between 17 and 23 September 2015, during the September 2015 coup led by Gilbert Diendéré. President Michel Kafando and Prime Minister Isaac Zida were held hostage as a result. "The coup was not a surprise," he said. "I have always said since the beginning of the transition if that unit was not dissolved, these forces would be deployed elsewhere and that we would have problems." He soon published a statement saying that dialogue was under-way between the military leadership and the "elements of the RSP" responsible for the coup, and noted that the country was in danger. Sy was a critic of the coup from the start. Known for his firmness of manner, he condemned an agreement proposed in the Economic Community of West African States by both African mediators, Senegalese President Macky Sall and Benin's Yayi Boni, that would allow the former supporters of Blaise Compaoré to compete in elections and offer amnesty to the perpetrators of the coup.

During the coup attempt, Sy declared himself interim president, as he was the highest-ranking government official who had not been arrested by Diendéré. He initiated a social media campaign to oust the coup's leaders. A large part of the army went along with his campaign, as they distrusted Diendéré and the Presidential Guard. Dendiéré ended up admitting the coup was a mistake. When elections were announced for November, Sy declined to participate and exited Burkinabé politics. He was awarded a journalism award by a South African organization for his role in ending the coup.

On 15 March 2016, he delivered the keynote speech at a conference in Accra, Ghana, entitled "Promoting Professional Journalism for Good Governance in West Africa." He has been characterized as "a Sankarist through and through."

=== Later roles ===
In 2017, he was appointed by Burkinabé President Roch Marc Christian Kaboré as the president's High Representative, functioning as a leader for the northern parts of Burkina Faso. In 2018, he was appointed as Minister of Defense, focused on anti-terrorist operations. He was dismissed from that position in 2021, after a wave of terror attacks in the country.

Political offices
Preceded by Michel Kafando; Transitional	President of Burkina Faso; Acting; 2015	Succeeded by Michel Kafando; Transitional
