= Hamidou Toure =

Burkinabès mathematician (born 1954)

Hamidou Toure FAAS
- Born: 14 October 1954 (age 71)
- Awards: Breakthrough Prize, IMU

Academic background
- Education: University of Franche-Comté; Université de Ouagadougou
- Thesis: Etude de problemes paraboliques fortement degeneres en une dimension d'espace (1994)
- Doctoral advisor: Philippe Bénilan

Hamidou Touré (born 14 October 1954) is a Burkinabès mathematician who has played a significant role in the development of mathematics programs in Burkina Faso, from the pre-school level to university level.

== Life and career ==
=== Early life and education ===
Hamidou Touré was born on 14 October 1954. He has earned several degrees in mathematics, including a Doctor of Philosophy in 1982 and a unique doctorate in 1994 from the University of Franche-Comté in Besançon, France, and a doctorate d'état in 1995 from the Université de Ouagadougou in Burkina Faso.

=== Career ===
Toure joined the Mathematics Department of the University of Ouagadougou in Burkina Faso. He gradually climbed the academic ranks and was eventually appointed as a full professor in 2002.

He has held various positions of leadership at the Institute of Mathematics and Physics, including being the Head of the Mathematics Department, Head of the Postgraduate Programs, Deputy Director of the Center of Computer Sciences in Charge of Distance Learning and ICT, Director of the University of Pedagogical Sciences Center, Director of the African Virtual University, Director of the Distance Learning Degree of Multimedia Communicator, Director of the Laboratory of LAME Equations and Mathematical Analysis, and Director of African Mathematics Millennium Science Initiative (AMMSI)'s West African Regional Office.

In addition to his academic positions, he has also served as a Senior Associate at the ICTP in Trieste, Italy, and was a Co-Founder and Coordinator of the Research Network PDE Modelling and Control. He is a member of the Executive Committee of the African Mathematical Union (UMA) and various other professional societies.

Toure's involvement in mathematics goes beyond research and teaching. He has played a significant role in the development of mathematics programs in Burkina Faso, from the pre-school level to university level. In addition, he is a member of the African Mathematical Union, and he has participated in the organisation of the African Mathematical Schools.

Toure has been a member of the International Centre for Pure and Applied Mathematics (CIMPA), and he has attended conferences and given lectures in various countries, including Japan, India, and France. He is also a permanent secretary of the National Academy of Sciences of Burkina Faso.

== Research ==
Toure has published research on partial differential equations, nonlinear semigroups, and mathematical modeling, among other topics. Toure has made significant contributions to the field of mathematics. He is primarily focused on the study of nonlinear elliptic parabolic equations within the context of evolution equations in Banach spaces. Additionally, he is interested in the stabilisation problem of parabolic-hyperbolic equations of a nonlinear nature, as well as the mathematical and numerical aspects of pollutants and transport in porous environments. His work involves analysis, functional analysis, and the study of partial differential equations.

== Awards and honours ==
Touré is the recipient of the International Mathematical Union (IMU) Breakthrough Prize, awarded for his contributions to the development of mathematics in Burkina Faso and Africa as a whole. He is also a Fellow of the African Academy of Sciences since 2009.
