= Blaise Bassoleth =

Burkinabé politician (1920–1976)

French Senator
- In office 8 June 1958 – 15 July 1959

Personal details
- Born: Blaise Alexandre Bassoleth; 20 November 1920 Réo (Upper Volta)
- Died: 24 December 1976 (aged 56) Ouagadougou (Republic of Upper Volta)

Blaise Bassoleth (November 20, 1920 – December 24, 1976) was a politician from Burkina Faso who was elected to the French Senate in 1958.

== See also ==
- Robert Ajavon
- Mathurin Anghiley
- Laurent Botokeky
- Étienne Djaument
- Christophe Kalenzaga
