= Yameogo =

Yameogo is a surname. Notable people with the surname include:

- Hermann Yaméogo (born 1948), Burkinabé politician
- Herve Yaméogo (born 1982), Burkinabé basketball player
- Narcisse Yaméogo (born 1990), Burkinabé footballer
- Blaise Yaméogo (born 1993), Burkinabé footballer
- Maurice Yaméogo (1921–1993), first President of Upper Volta (Burkina Faso)
- Salvador Yaméogo, Burkinabé politician
- S. Pierre Yameogo (1955–2019), Burkinabé film director
