= Commune FC =

- Full name: Commune Football Club
- Founded: 1977
- Ground: Stade du 4-Août; Ouagadougou, Burkina Faso
- Capacity: 40,000
- Chairman: Souleymane Somlaré
- Manager: Seydou Zerbo
- League: Burkinabé Premier League
Home colours

Commune Football Club is a Burkinabé football club based in Ouagadougou and founded in 1977. They play their home games at the Stade du 4-Août.

== Honours ==
- Burkinabé Premier League: 1

2007.

- Coupe du Faso: 0
- Burkinabé SuperCup: 1

2007.

== Performance in CAF competitions ==
- CAF Champions League: 1 appearance

2008 – Preliminary Round

== Current squad ==
Note: Flags indicate national team as defined under FIFA eligibility rules; some limited exceptions apply. Players may hold more than one non-FIFA nationality.

No.	Pos.	Nation	Player
6	DF	(Burkina Faso) BFA	Brahima Korbeogo
