= Mamounata Nikiéma =

Burkinabé producer and director

- Born: 1979 (age 46–47)
- Citizenship: Burkinabé
- Education: Gaston Berger University
- Occupations: Film Producer and Director
- Notable work: Vue d'Afrique
- Awards: Audience Award at the Ouagadougou Festival of Cultural Identities in November 2018.

Mamounata Nikiéma (born 1979) is a Burkinabé producer and director. She was trained at the Gaston Berger University of Saint-Louis, Senegal. She was General Secretary of l'association Africadoc Burkina (the Burkinabé Africadoc Association) from 2009 to 2014.

== Biography ==
Mamounata Nikiéma was born in 1979 in Burkina Faso. She first trained in communications at the University of Ouagadougou. In 2001, she won a literary Baccalaureate, prompting her further into journalism, and in 2008 she received a masters in documentary creation from Gaston Berger University, a qualification she pursued after leaning away from journalism and towards film. In 2009, she was made General Secretary of l'association Africadoc Burkina, a position held until 2014. She set up her own company, Pilumpiku Production, in 2011. In October 2017, she was one of the three winners of the B-Faso Creative program. She was awarded the Audience Award at the Ouagadougou Festival of Cultural Identities in November 2018.

== Filmography ==
=== As director ===
- Lumière d'octobre (2015); 75 minute documentary about the 2014 Burkinabé uprising
- Vue d'Afrique (2013)
- Savoir raison garder (2011)
- Une journée avec (2011)
- Kounkoli, le pleurer rire à Darsalamé (2009)
- Manges-tu le riz de la vallée (2008)

=== As producer ===
- Femmes, entièrement femmes (2013)
