= Dramane Yaméogo =

Burkinabe Politician (died 2026)

Dramane Yaméogo (died 27 June 2026) was a Burkinabe politician.

== Life and career ==
In 2003 to 2012, Yaméogo became Burkina Faso's ambassador to Nigeria. He was the minister of justice between 2012 and 2014.

Yaméogo died in Ouagadougou 27 June 2026.
