= Christine Kafando =

Burkinabé activist (b. 1971/1972)

Christine Kafando (born 1971 or 1972) is a Burkinabé HIV/AIDS activist. Since the 1990s, she has been active in HIV/AIDS prevention and response efforts. For her work, she has been recognized by Burkina Faso's Order of Merit and France's Legion of Honour.

== Biography ==
Kafando was born in Ivory Coast. She moved to Bobo-Dioulasso, Burkina Faso, in 1994. She married her husband in 1997, at age 25. That year, they both attended an HIV screening; Kafando was HIV-positive, while her husband was not. After the couple divorced, Kafando adopted two children, in 1999 and 2002.

Kafando decided to devote her efforts to HIV/AIDS-related work. As a volunteer for a local organization, she advocated for HIV testing and acted as a liaison between patients and physicians. In 2001, as part of her activism work, Kafando became the first Burkinese woman to publicly disclose her HIV-positive status. She is credited with encouraging then-president Blaise Compaoré to declare his support for HIV/AIDS-related efforts, and to publicly announce that he himself would be tested for HIV.

Kafando founded and serves as president of Espoir Pour Demain (Hope for Tomorrow), which serves children with HIV/AIDS in Bobo-Dioulasso, raises awareness on mother-to-child transmission of HIV, and trains youth to become peer educators. She also coordinates the organization Maison des Associations de Lutte Contre le SIDA (House of Anti-AIDS Associations).

In 2004, Kafando was decorated with Burkina Faso's National Order of Merit. In 2011, she was named a Chevalier of the French Legion of Honour, by the French ambassador to Burkina Faso. In 2014, she was awarded the International Prize by Sidaction, a French HIV/AIDS charity.
