= Zinda Kaboré =

Burkinabé politician (1920–1947)

Kaboré Bebzinda, better known as Philippe Zinda Kaboré (18 November 1920, Koudougou, French Upper Volta – 25 May 1947, Abidjan, French Ivory Coast) was a politician of Voltaic origin.

== Biography ==
Zinda Kaboré, the son of a chief of the traditional village Mossi, was a student at Bingerville, Ivory Coast and Dakar, Senegal. On 10 November 1946, he was elected, along with Félix Houphouët-Boigny and Ouezzin Coulibaly, as one of the three deputies of the colony of Ivory Coast in the French National Assembly. He died a few months later, on 25 May 1947, in Abidjan, Ivory Coast at the age of 26. Rumor maintained that he was poisoned, but doctors determined that he had a heart attack.

== Honors ==
One of the main high schools in Burkina Faso bears his name.

== Resources ==
Translated from the article in French Wikipedia.

Official Burkina webpage's biography (in French)
