= Joséphine Ouédraogo =

Burkinabé sociologist

Minister of Family Development and Solidarity
- In office 1 September 1984 – 15 October 1987
- President: Thomas Sankara

Minister of Justice
- In office 24 November 2014 – January 2016
- President: Michel Kafando

Personal details
- Born: 22 December 1949 (age 76) Koudougou, Upper Volta
- Education: Paris Descartes University
- Occupation: Sociologist

Joséphine Ouédraogo (born 22 December 1949) is a Burkinabé sociologist and politician. She served as Minister of Justice of Burkina Faso from 2014 to 2016.

== Biography ==
Ouédraogo was born in 1949 and received her early education in Koudougou. She was brought up in the Mossi tradition. Her father, Henri Guissou, was an MP in the French Parliament for French West Africa and her mother was illiterate. After her father was named the ambassador to France, she moved to Paris in 1961. Ouédraogo attended the Institut de la Tour in Paris and she received the baccalauréat in 1968. In 1974, she earned a degree in sociology at the Paris Descartes University. After receiving her degree, Ouédraogo worked as a sociological research assistant and studied rural society, development approaches and their impact on women and peasants.

She was a supporter of Thomas Sankara but was overall not involved in politics, and was concerned by violence that had occurred as a result of Sankara's rise to power. Nonetheless, in September 1984 he unexpectedly offered her the position of minister of family development and solidarity. Sankara said her sociological work was helpful to the revolution.

Ouédraogo stated that she would consider Sankara's offer, and while she was conferring with relatives on whether to accept his offer Sankara publicly announced that she had joined his cabinet. In her role, Ouédraogo pushed for an end to female genital mutilation, proposed a national family law, and supported a women's strike in 1984. She was instrumental in commemorating 8 March as International Women's Day in Burkina Faso. Sankara was killed in a coup on 15 October 1987 and Blaise Compaoré took power. She moved to Tunisia in December 1987.

Ouédraogo went into exile and served as an important figure for women's development in Africa. From 1989 to 1992 she served as a project coordinator for the Pan-African Development Institute in Cameroon. In 1997, she became director of the United Nations Economic Commission for Africa's gender division. She was successful in making women's issues a prominent feature in government conferences and task forces. In addition, she created a new evaluation program, the African Gender Development Index. She became deputy executive secretary of the United Nations Economic Commission for Africa in 2005. From 2007 to 2011 Ouédraogo was secretary-general of Dakar's Enda Third World. In 2007, she was named one of the 50 most influential women in Africa by Jeune Afrique.

In 2012, Ouédraogo returned to Burkina Faso. She became head of the consulting firm Appui recherche action (ARC). In October 2014, Compaoré fell from power after a number of protests that included women brandishing spatulas and brooms to signify their displeasure. Michel Kafando was chosen as president in November 2014 after a panel of 23 officials preferred him to Ouédraogo and journalist Cherif Sy. After Kafando was sworn in, he named Ouédraogo Minister of Justice. She harshly criticized the justice system in the old regime, and one of her first actions was reopening an investigation on the assassination of the president of the National Revolutionary Council, which was blocked for almost two years by the civil courts. Ouédraogo brought together 2,000 civil society members, policemen, judges, and lawyers to Ouagadougou in March 2015 to sign a National Pact for Renewal of Justice. She served until January 2016 and was replaced as minister of justice by Bessolé René Bagoro.

== Personal life ==
Ouédraogo has a husband and three children. She is a devout Christian. She identifies with feminism and anti-globalization.

== Publications ==
- Etude sur les besoins des femmes dans les villages de l’A.V.V. et proposition d’un programme d’intervention – April 1977 – USAID – SA.
- “Les systèmes alimentaires – Femmes et Développement en Afrique de l’Ouest” UNSRID – 1986 Série systèmes alimentaires et sociétés.
- “Rapport entre droit foncier traditionnel et droit moderne illustré par l’impact du régime Société sur le statut des femmes au Burkina Faso” - 1989.

Political offices
Preceded by Jerome Traoré	Minister of Justice; 2014–2016	Succeeded by Bessolé René Bagoro
