= Yabre Juliette Kongo =

Burkinabe politician (born 1966)

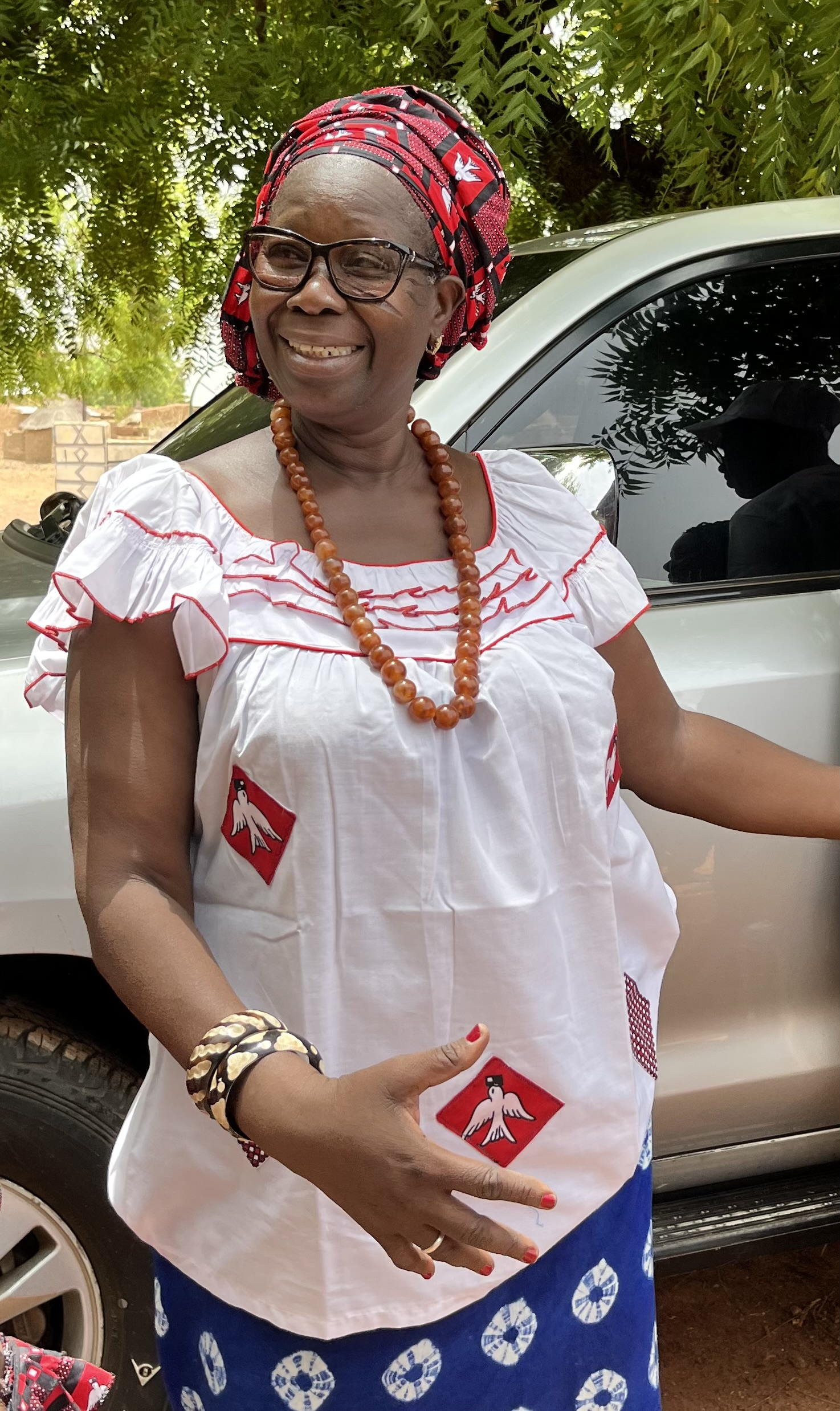
- Born: 24 May 1966 (age 60); Ziniaré, Burkina Faso
- Occupation: Politician
- Organizations: World Council of Pan-Africanism (COMOPA); International Federation of Development Ambassadors (FIAD); International Council of Museums (ICOM); BAMBYINGA women's association
- Notable work: Founder of Kolgondiésé Women's Museum
- Family: Moogho Naaba
- Awards: Knight of the Order of Merit for Arts and Communication; Queen Mother of the Kingdom of Bangoulap; Winner of the 1st prize of the Amazon NANGA of African women's combativeness

Yabre Juliette Kongo (born 24 May 1966 in Ziniaré, Burkina Faso) is a politician. She hails from the royal family of Moogho Naaba. She served as a member of the National Assembly and was a former advisor to the President of Burkina Faso. Additionally, she is known as the founder of the Kolgondiésé women's museum.

== Early life and education ==
Yabre Juliette Kongo is a princess of the Moogho Naaba royal lineage and is a direct descendant of Moogho Naaba Kom2. She holds a certificate as a female leader mediator for peace in Africa from the University of Ouagadougou. Furthermore, she obtained various diplomas including a Business Administrator Diploma and Certified International Trainer Diploma from the Virtual Leadership University of Development Ambassadors, as well as a Professional Coach Diploma from the same institution. In 2012–2017, she earned her Certificate of Cultural Study (CEC) from the University of Relevance Ouidah in Benin.

== Career ==
She was elected as a member of parliament in 2020. She is renowned for founding and promoting the Kolgondiésé Women's Museum and the KIEOGO (civic and citizenship training camp). Yabre also holds positions such as President of the BAMBYINGA women's association of Kolgondiéssé commune of Ziniaré, statutory member of the World Council of Pan-Africanism (COMOPA), the International Federation of Development Ambassadors (FIAD), and the International Council of Museums (ICOM). She is also a member of the African Catholic Press Union – Burkina (UCAP-B).

== Distinctions ==
Yabre Juliette Kongo was honored as a Knight of the Order of Merit for Arts and Communication. Additionally, she was elevated to the dignity of Queen Mother of the Kingdom of Bangoulap in western Cameroon. She has received various accolades including the special guest tribute to women in Montreal, Canada, and the 1st prize of the Amazon NANGA of African women's combativeness in Benin. She has also sponsored sub-Saharan students and interns in Tunisia and Burkina Faso, as well as being a godmother to students at Norbert Zongo University in Koudougou.
