= Issa Ouédraogo =

Canadian Paralympic track and field athlete

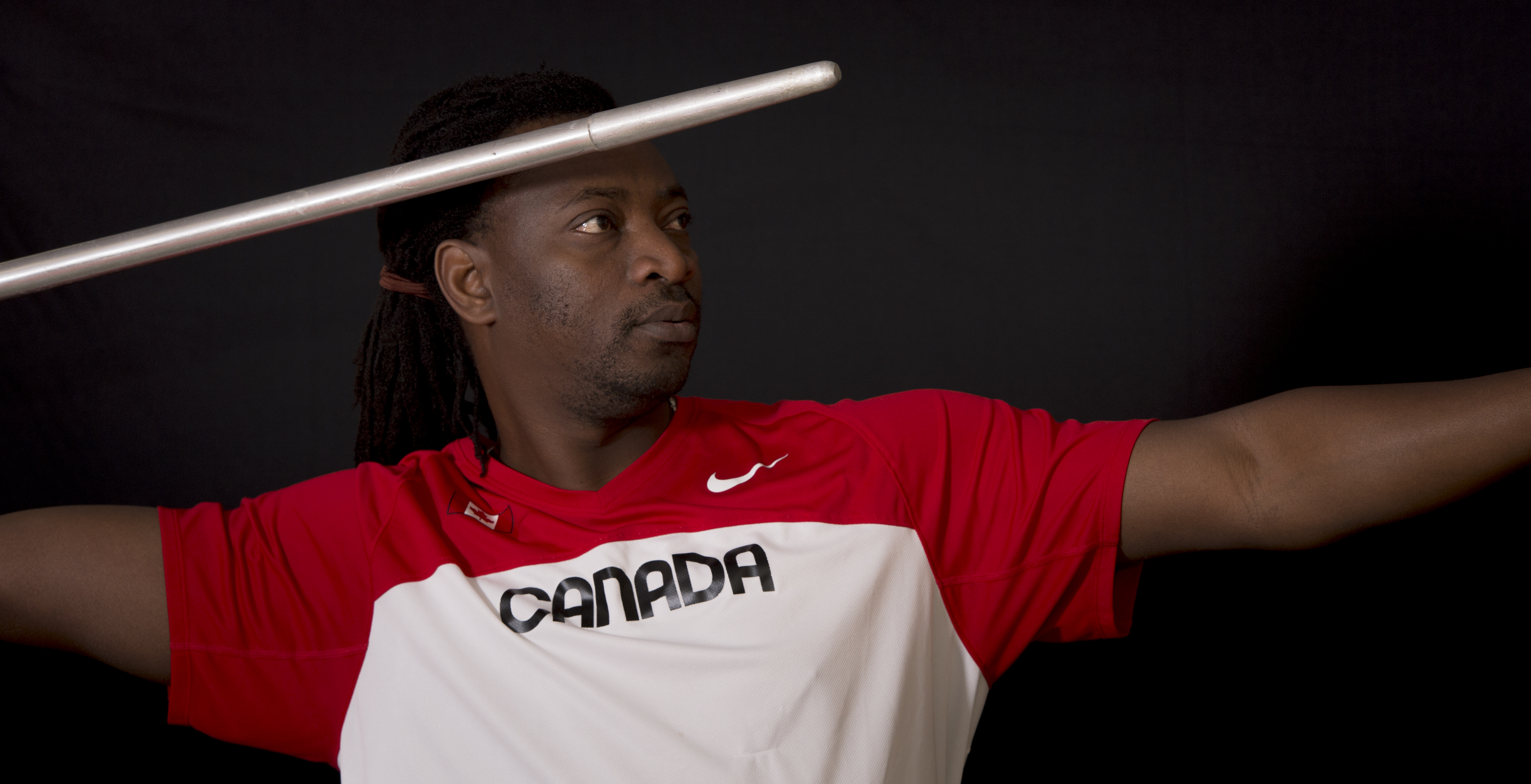
- Issa Ouédraogo, October 2014

Personal information
- Full name: Issa Ouédraogo
- Nationality: Canadian
- Born: Burkina Faso
- Years active: Since 2006

Sport
- Sport: Paralympic athletics
- Event(s): Javelin throw, discus, shot put
- Coached by: Nathalie Séguin
Medal record
Canadian Track and Field Championships
Gold medal – first place	16
Silver medal – second place	1
Bronze medal – third place	1

Issa Ouédraogo is a Paralympic athlete in the shot put, discus and javelin throw. He is the Class F57 Canadian shot put champion and record holder.

== Biography ==
Ouédraogo was born in Burkina Faso and developed polio, an infectious disease that can cause leg paralysis, when he was 4. With rapid treatment, followed by almost two years of rehabilitation, he was able to walk again. He immigrated to Canada in the early 2000s.

In 2006 he began to develop an interest in throwing. Friends in para-athletics in Sherbrooke, Quebec, encouraged him to try it with Jean Laroche, a leading Paralympic coach. He moved to Sherbrooke to pursue his university studies while beginning his training. A teammate, Jacques Martin—a former javelin throw and shot put world champion—became his mentor.

Issa took part in his first competition in May 2006 in Toronto, Ontario. A few months later, he set a national record in the javelin throw.

== Athletic career ==
In 2006 Ouédraogo became the Canadian javelin throwing champion, and in 2010, he became the shot put champion. He represents Quebec in national competitions and Canada in international competitions, including the Parapan American Games in Mexico in 2011. In 2013, he was invited to the Lyon World Athletics Competition in Lyon, France, but, following an injury, he was unable to compete.

Ouédraogo took part in the Canadian Track and Field Championships in London, Ontario, in 2006; Windsor, Ontario, in 2007 and 2008; Toronto in 2009 and 2010; Calgary, Alberta, in 2011 and 2012; and Moncton, New Brunswick, in 2013 and 2014.

== Education and non-athletic activities ==
Ouédraogo has a bachelor's degree in international relations from the University of Sherbrooke. In 2008, he put his athletic career on hold to concentrate on an international internship. In 2012, he earned a graduate diploma in public leadership, and in 2013, he began pursuing a graduate diploma in public policy.

Additionally:

- In 2014, as an ambassador for para-athletes, he participated in a video produced by the Association Polio Québec to increase awareness of post-polio syndrome.
- From 2007 to 2013, he was the athlete ambassador of the city of Sherbrooke.
- In 2008 he received the REMI immigrant recognition award in the sports personality category.
- He is a three-time recipient of the Ada Mackenzie Scholarship for student athletes.
