= Juliette Bonkoungou =

Burkinabe diplomat and judge

Member of the National Assembly of Burkina Faso
- In office May 1997 – 2000

Personal details
- Born: 14 May 1954 (age 72) Yameogo in Koudougou, Burkina Faso
- Party: Congress for Democracy and Progress
- Children: 3
- Education: Ecole Nationale de la Magistrature
- Occupation: Politician, diplomat and judge

Juliette Bonkoungou (born 14 May 1954), known informally in Burkina Faso as Julie of Koudougou, her native town, is a Burkinabé judge, politician and diplomat. She is a member of the ruling Congress for Democracy and Progress (CDP) party, has worked as president of the Economic and Social Council (Conseil économique et social) and is the Ambassador of Burkina Faso to Canada.

== Early life and family ==
Juliette Bonkoungou was born in Yameogo in Koudougou, Burkina Faso on 14 May 1954, the eldest of eight children. Her father, Joseph Yameogo, a prince of Burkina Nabe Yiri, served as a policeman in the town of Bobo Dioulasso for two years and then returned to his hometown, Koudougou, where he also worked as a police officer. Her mother was Madeleine Yameogo.

Bonkoungou met her husband Pascal Bonkoungou in 1981 in France while both were studying there. Her husband is a doctor specializing in diseases of the stomach and abdomen and the couple have a daughter and two sons.

== Education ==
Bonkoungou is a jurist and economist. After obtaining a master's degree in civil law and a DEA (postgraduate diploma), she obtained with distinction a diploma from the Ecole Nationale de la Magistrature. This was followed by a further postgraduate diploma in industrial purchasing management from the Institute of Business and Administration in Bordeaux, France. She also successfully completed full professional training in legal practice at the civil court of Bordeaux. She speaks French, English, Arabic and Dioula.

== Career ==
Bonkoungou had a permanent academic appointment lecturing in the Law of Work and Social Security at the National School of Administration and Magistracy from September 1979 to June 1981, following which she taught Law of Work and Social Security in the faculty of Law and Political Sciences of the University of Ouagadougou from September 1985 to July 1987. She was a judge at the Ouagadougou Palace of Justice from November 1984 to December 1985 and then until December 1987 presided over the Ouagadougou Tribunal of Work. From December 1987 to July 1989, she was the director general of the National Television of Burkina Faso.

=== Achievements ===
As a Minister, Bonkoungou took on responsibility for public employment. She wrote proposals for the redefinition of the role and missions of the state and carried out an organizational and functional audit of the country's ministries and state organisations. Her dissertation at the School of Commerce in Paris was on the opportunities for using solar power in Burkina Faso.

She was head of the National Expert Group of the United Nations in the matter of public administration and finance in August 1995 with responsibility for the session preparation specialist of ONU on the public administration of development in December 1995 and was its member since October 1993. She has also presented papers and led sessions at seminars, conferences and workshops on the questions of institutional reforms and of good governance in Burkina Faso. She has also been honorary president and member of many associations working for the interests of women and children. She was a founding member of the association of women lawyers of Burkina Faso.

=== Political career ===
As a member of the Congress for Democracy and Progress (CDP), Bonkoungou was elected as a Member of the National Assembly of Burkina Faso in May 1997. She was also a municipal councillor of her home city Koudougou, the third largest city in Burkina Faso. She served for seven years as Minister of Civil Service and Administrative Modernization. In 1997, she was appointed president of the Economic and Social Council where she served for three years, before being appointed as Ambassador of Burkina Faso to Canada.

=== Diplomatic career ===
As Ambassador of Burkina Faso to Canada, Bonkoungou organized traditional celebrations of Burkina Faso in Canada, which allowed people from other countries to know more about her country, as well as being a reminder of home for people from Burkina Faso living abroad. One of her goals was to change the negative image of Africa and to promote the realities of Africa to Canadians.

=== Charitable work and honors ===
On 23 August 2003 the population of Koudougou received 26 tons of cereals from Bonkoungou, an act she described as her contribution to the fight against famine in her native town. She is also the patron of many associations. She has been named Officer of national order of Burkina Faso; rand officer of the "Lion du Senegal"; winner of the "Mémorial Africain" of the Pan African Institute of Lugano in 1999 and the last and the award of Canada's image of Africa.
