= Laurent Botokeky =

Malagasy politician (1919–1987)

Laurent Botokeky (5 December 1919 in Bosy, Madagascar – 1987) was a politician from Madagascar who was elected to the French Senate in 1958.
