= Boureima Badini =

Burkinabé politician

Boureima Badini (born May 25, 1956) is a Burkinabé politician. He served in the government of Burkina Faso as Minister of Justice from 1999 to 2007.

== Biography ==
Badini was born in Ouahigouya, located in Yatenga Province. He was a member of the National Privatization Commission from March 1991 to 1994, and in October 1991 he became First Vice-President of the National Commission for the Organization of Presidential and Legislative Elections. He also became the League of Consumers of Burkina Faso's Vice-President in charge of foreign relations in January 1992. From 1988 to October 5, 1996, Badini was Legal Adviser to the Burkinabé Football Federation and was the President of the Federation's Disputes Commission; subsequently he was President of the Federation from October 5, 1996 to August 1997.

After serving as a member of the Economic and Social Council from 1993 to 1996 and as Director of the National Social Security Fund from April 1993 to October 1999, Badini was appointed to the government as Minister of Justice on 12 October 1999. A year later, his responsibilities were expanded when he was appointed Minister of Justice and the Promotion of Human Rights on 12 November 2000; subsequently his portfolio was reduced when he was appointed simply Minister of Justice on June 10, 2002. After five more years, he was replaced as Minister of Justice in the government that was appointed on June 10, 2007.

On September 4, 2007, to assist in the peace process aimed at resolving the Ivorian Civil War, Badini was appointed Ambassador and Representative of the President of Burkina Faso in Côte d'Ivoire. According to Filippe Sawadogo, the Minister of Communication, President Blaise Compaoré selected Badini because he wanted someone with a legal background, as well as "a great ability to listen and experience in conflict resolution", for this role.

Political offices
Preceded by Larba Yarga	Minister of Justice; 2000–2007	Succeeded by Zakalia Koté
Diplomatic posts
Preceded by Emile Ilboudo	Ambassador of Burkina Faso to Côte d'Ivoire; 2007–?	Succeeded by
