= Nouhoun Sigué =

Burkinabé politician, veterinarian (1911–2004)

- Born: June 1, 1911; Ouahigouya, Burkina Faso
- Died: October 1, 2004 (aged 93)

Dr. Sigué Nouhoun or Nouhoun Sigué (June 1, 1911 – October 1, 2004) was a veterinarian and politician from Burkina Faso who served in the French Senate from 1948 to 1952. He was born in Ouahigouya, Burkina Faso.
