= Africadoc =

Network of African documentary filmmakers

- Formation: 2002
- Purpose: Encourage documentary production in Africa
- Region served: Africa
- Parent organization: Docmonde
- Website: www.docmonde.org/africadoc/

Africadoc is a network of documentary filmmakers and associations in Africa organized by Ardèche Images and since 2012 by Docmonde. It includes associations in Benin, Burkina Faso, Cameroon, Republic of the Congo, Mali, Mauritania, Niger, Senegal and Togo. Some of the associations run workshops in documentary writing and production.

== Origins ==
Africadoc was founded in 2002, initially expanding within French-speaking African countries. Africadoc 2005 was launched in Saint-Louis, Senegal at the end of 2004. With support from UNESCO, fourteen young African documentary writers and producers were given coaching and assistance in launching projects in their West and Central African countries. The project included arranging meetings with about sixty partners from European and North and South American television channels, foundations and institutions. According to Rosa Gonzalez of UNESCO, the ultimate aim of the project is "to build the fabric of a creative network of professionals involved in documentary-making, which can become financially sustainable and then cater to the needs of African television channels for local content".

== Activities ==
To promote documentaries, Africadoc Burkina organizes Les Rencontres Sobaté in Ouagadougou and Africadoc Cameroon organizes Images en Live in Yaoundé. Les Rencontres Sobaté means "Meetings for convincing" in the Bwamu language, perhaps for convincing young people to get into directing documentaries. The meetings include screenings and discussions of documentaries, classes on aspects such as writing and debates on training, professionalism and finance. The Images en Live (Live Images) festival follows workshops and production projects, and screens a selection of new documentaries from the region. The event has been supported by the Goethe Institute, Cervantes Institute and the French Cultural Centre in Yaoundé.

In April 2010 a 12-day Africadoc workshop for South African authors and filmmakers was organized by the National Film and Video Foundation in Johannesburg. In November 2011 Africadoc Benin organized BeninDocs – International Festival of First Documentary Film, entirely devoted to first films created by young filmmakers. BeninDocs would include screenings at three locations in Paris, France, one in Cotonou two in Porto-Novo. Africadoc Senegal provides an annual meeting and training programme for screenwriters from all Central and West African countries called 'Tënk'. The program includes teaching how to create a screenplay and how to find and work with an independent producer.
