= Emile Ilboudo =

Burkinabé politician and diplomat

Émile Ilboudo is a Burkinabé politician and diplomat.

He has served as the Ambassador of Burkina Faso in Côte d'Ivoire.

Diplomatic posts
Preceded by	Ambassador of Burkina Faso to Côte d'Ivoire; 1995–2007	Succeeded by Boureima Badini
