= Maxime D'Hoore =

Belgian footballer

Personal information
- Full name: Maxime D'Hoore-Gnimassou
- Date of birth: 7 March 1978 (age 48)
- Place of birth: Ouagadougou, Upper Volta
- Height: 1.74 m (5 ft 9 in)
- Position: Forward

Senior career*
Years	Team	Apps	(Gls)
1997–1999	Club Brugge		
1999–2000	KRC Harelbeke		
2000–2002	KSK Maldegem		
2002–2003	KV Kortrijk		
2003–2004	KSK Wevelgem City		
- * Club domestic league appearances and goals

Maxime D'Hoore (born 7 March 1978) is a Belgian former professional footballer who played as a forward.
