= Claire Ouedraogo =

Nun and anti-FGM activist

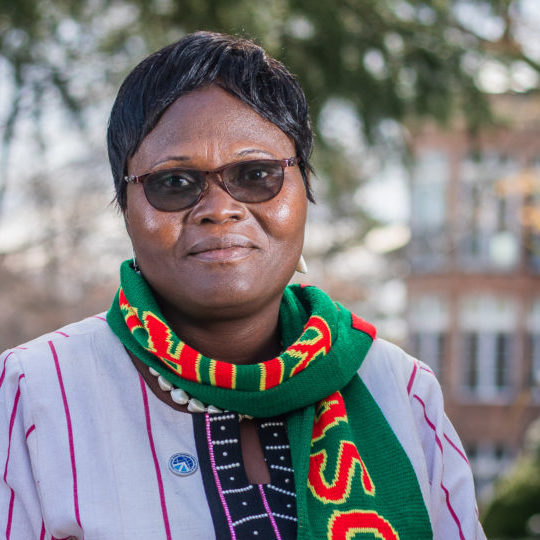
- Occupation: nun
- Known for: anti-FGM activist in Burkina Faso

Claire Ouedraogo is a nun and an anti–female genital mutilation (FGM) activist in Burkina Faso. She became the President of the Songmanegre Association for Women’s Development (Association féminine songmanegre pour le développement) and one of her country's Ambassador of Peace. She was chosen as an International Woman of Courage in March 2020.

== Life ==
She was brought up in a Christian family who would go an annual pilgrimage. She decided early that she wanted a Christian life and in 2005 she was studying the bible with choir of a new church when she came across a life changing verse about how people would not be given in marriage, but be like the angels after the resurrection. She decided this was her vocation and in 2006 she went to Togo to spend some weeks with the nuns there. She became a nun on the 7 September 2013 in Yaoundé in Cameroon where she had been a novice for two years.

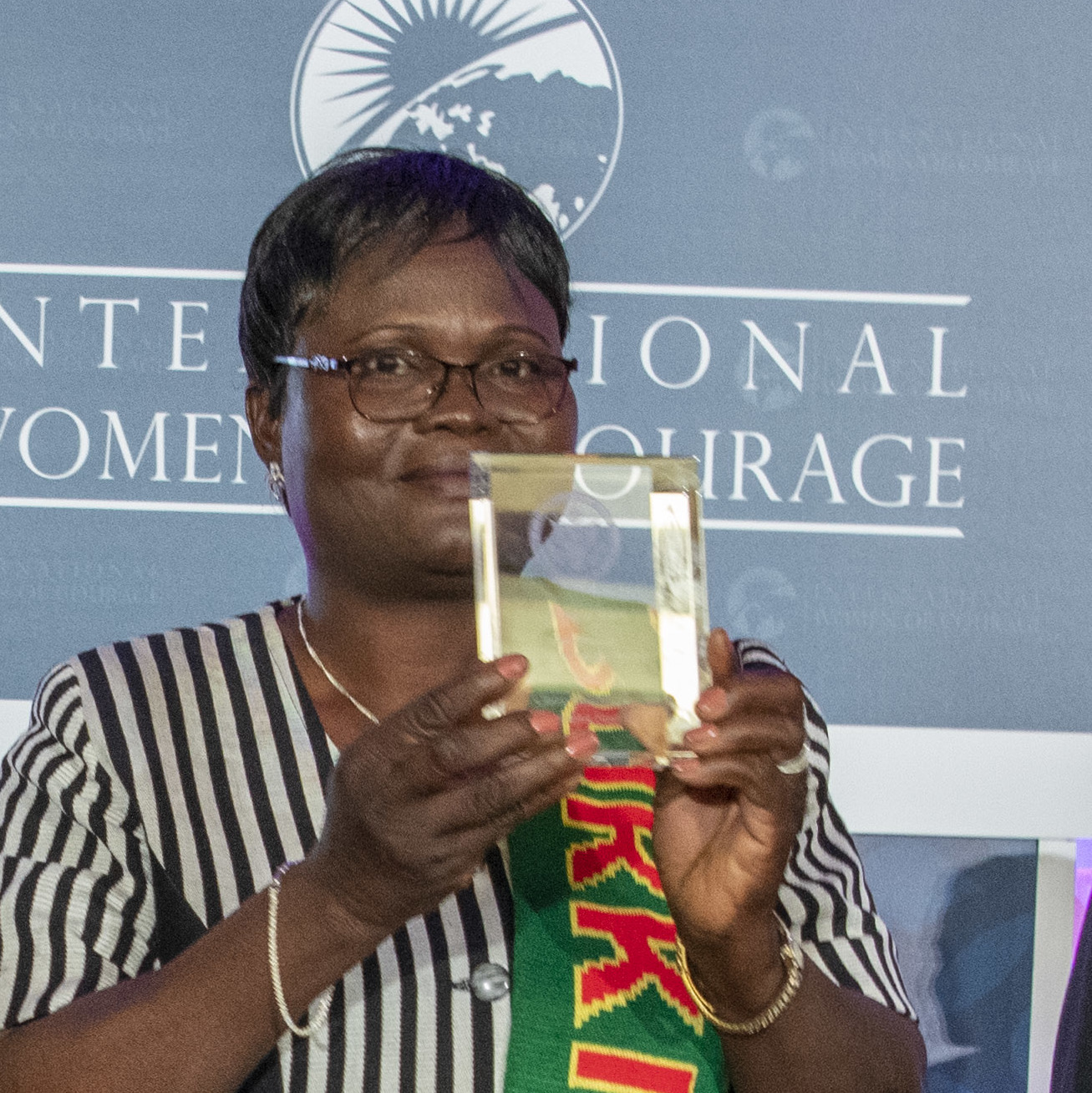
4 March 2020 award Ceremony for Woman of Courage

She became the President of the Songmanegre Association for Women’s Development (Association féminine songmanegre pour le développement). The organisation is known for its struggle against FGM but the group supports women in general with schemes including contraception and micro credit.

In 2016 the Prime Minister of Burkina Faso, Paul Kaba Thieba, noted her work with women in the countryside and appointed her an Ambassador for Peace. In line with that, she continues her work even under the threat of terrorism in Bam Province in particular.

She was chosen as an International Woman of Courage on 4 March 2020 by the US Secretary of State.
