= Larba Yarga =

Burkinabé politician

Larba Yarga was the Minister of Justice for Burkina Faso until approximately 2000. He also served as a member of the Pan-African Parliament from Burkina Faso.

Political offices
Preceded by	Minister of Justice ?-2000	Succeeded by Boureima Badini
