= Zakalia Koté =

Burkinabé politician

Zakalia Kote is a Burkinabé politician who served in the government of Burkina Faso as Minister of Justice from 2007 to 2011.

Kote worked as a magistrate for years before being appointed Secretary-General of the Government and the Council of Ministers on January 6, 2006. Later, on June 10, 2007, he was appointed Minister of Justice.

Political offices
Preceded by Boureima Badini	Minister of Justice; 2007–2011	Succeeded by Jerome Traoré
