= Robert Ajavon =

Togolese politician

Robert Ajavon (10 April 1910 - 5 October 1996) was a Togolese politician who served in the French Senate from 1952 to 1958.
