= Bouri Sanhouidi =

Bouri Jean Victor Sanhouidi (born 1949), is a diplomat and economist from Burkina Faso.

Bouri Sanhouidi graduated from Université Laval in Sainte-Foy, Quebec. He is a United Nations official.

He is currently, as of March 2021, is the Acting Resident Representative of the United Nations Development Program (UNDP) in Benin. He took office on February 6, 2020 in Cotonou.

== Job History ==
He started his career in 1985 with United Nations as UNDP JPO program Administrator in New York United States, Dakar Senegal and Conakry Guinea.

Sanhouidi has been UNDP Assistant Resident Representative in Zaire from 1985 to 1988 and UNDP Deputy Resident Representative (program) in Benin from 1988 to 1991. He was the chief of UNDP-UNV Africa section and director of management program division from 1991 to 1996 in Geneva (Switzerland) and Bonn (Germany). He served as UNDP Resident Representative and UN Resident Coordinator in Niger from 1996 to 1999, UNDP Resident Representative, UN Resident Coordinator and UN Humanitarian Affairs Coordinator in Democratic Republic of the Congo from 2000 to 2002, UNDP Resident Representative, UNIC Director and UN Resident Coordinator from 2002 to 2007 in Madagascar. In April 2007 he has been appointed by the United Nations Secretary-General Ban Ki-moon as United Nations Resident Coordinator for Senegal. He is the designated representative of the UN Secretary-General in Senegal. UNDP’s Administrator Kemal Dervis has also appointed Mr. Sanhouidi as Resident Representative of United Nations Development Programme UNDP in Senegal. Mr. Sanhouidi has extensive experience in the management of countries in conflicts.

Sanhouidi played an important role in the organization of the electoral process for Malagasy Presidential election in December 2006. He managed the political dialogue and the financial support of the international community.
