= Alice Ouédraogo =

Burkinabé public health official (born 1955)

- Born: 1955 (age 70–71)
- Occupation: Lawyer
- Known for: Work for the International Labour Organization

Alice Ouédraogo (born 1955) is a Burkinabé public health official. A lawyer by profession she has worked extensively with the International Labour Organization (ILO). Ouédraogo was ILO representative to Cameroon and Ethiopia and also director of its Central Africa region. She is currently head of the ILO HIV/AIDS programme and works to reduce the transmission of HIV and increase the number of people in treatment.

== Career ==
Alice Ouédraogo (née Sorgho) was born in 1955. She is the daughter of Mathias Daogo Sorgho, a member of the territorial assembly of the French Upper Volta (colonial-era Burkina Faso) for Tenkodogo between 1952 and 1959. Sorgho was president of the assembly from 1954 to 1957 and served in various cabinet positions until 1963 during the time Burkina Faso won its independence. He was ambassador to France from 1963 to 1966.

Ouédraogo is a lawyer specialising in international law with experience in Africa and with the United Nations. She was previously a representative for the International Labour Organization (ILO) to Cameroon and Ethiopia. She left the role in Cameroon in July 2006 and upon doing so praised Cameroon's Minister of Women's Empowerment and the Family Suzanne Mbomback for her actions to improve the lives of women in the country.

In 2008 Ouédraogo was made director of the ILO's Central African Regional Sub-Office. She subsequently became deputy director of the ILO's Policy Integration Department where is responsibilities (in 2010) included monitoring the ILO's contributions to satisfying the Millennium Development Goals (in particular the first goal "to eradicate extreme poverty and hunger").

Ouédraogo is currently chief of the "HIV/AIDS and the World of Work" programme at the ILO. The programme has, since 2001, run activities for more than 3 million workers and established programmes in more than 70 countries. At least 10 countries have adopted national laws based on the programme's code of practice. Ouédraogo was working towards reaching a target of 15 million people being within AIDS treatment programmes by 2015. The programme under Ouédraogo looked to provide improved employment opportunities to reduce the likelihood of prostitution and unprotected sex and to improve cooperation between the public and private sectors with benefits for corporate image and the use of the private sector's distribution network, publicity and marketing. Ouédraogo also looked at the benefits of improving the health of prison staff to reduce the spread of HIV and tuberculosis in detention facilities. She also conducted research into the relationship between HIV treatment rates and employment status; the impact on HIV treatment of restricting the movement of migrants and the use of HIV testing and counselling in the workplace. Ouédraogo praised the actions of a number of medical insurance firms in Sri Lanka that removed exclusions from their policies for the treatment of HIV.

Ouédraogo spoke at the International Trade Union Confederation Conference on the Global crisis and aid effectiveness in 2010 and the US Department of Labor HIV/AIDS conference in 2012. She was also a judge for the 2014 UN Cares awards.
