= Laurent Sedego =

Burkinabe politician

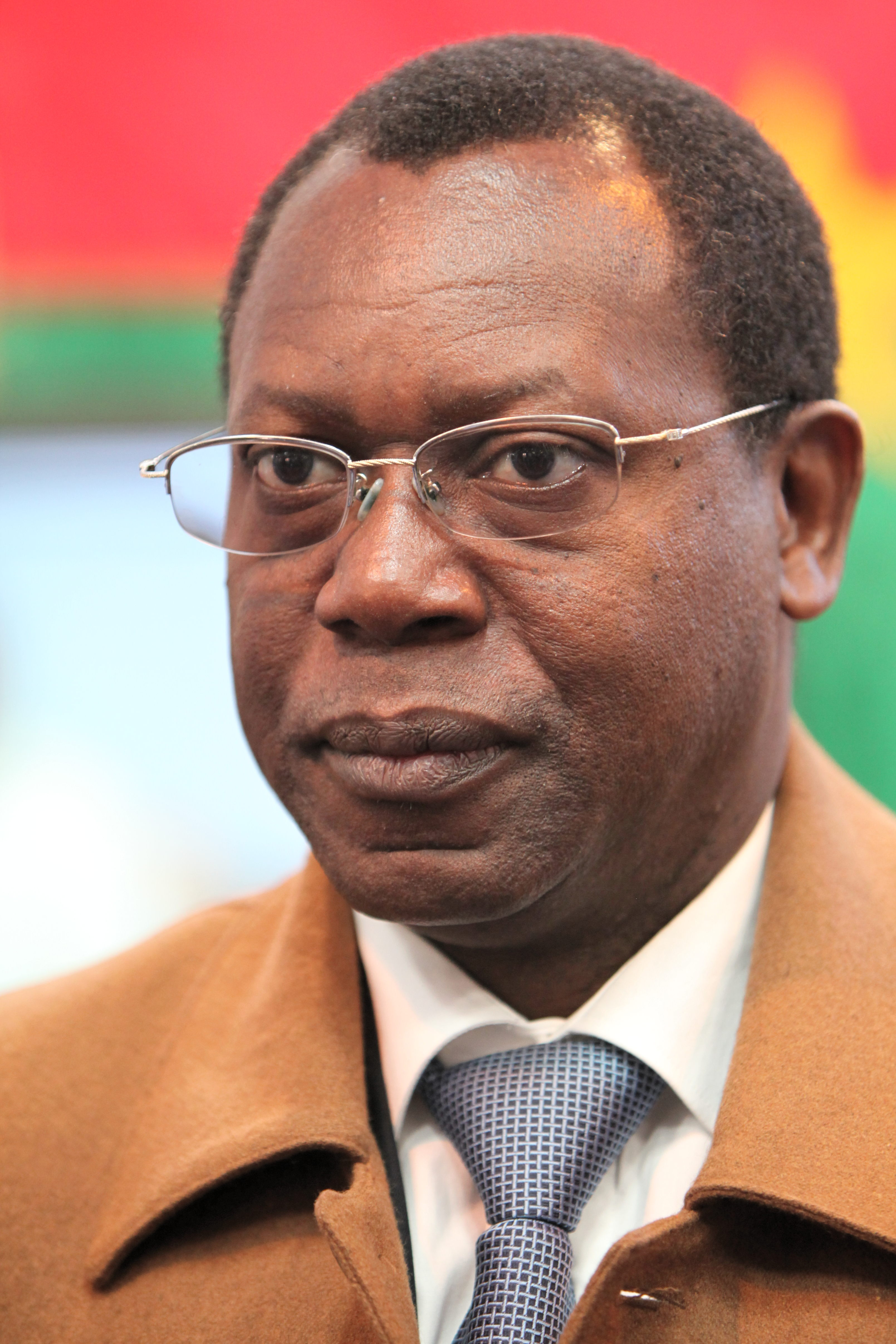

Laurent Gouindé Sedego (born March 15, 1956) is a politician and former military officer from Burkina Faso. He served as Minister of Agriculture, Water and Fisheries Resources from 2008 to 2013.

Sedego was born in Arbinda. He served in the military and was Director of the National People's Service from 1985 to 1987, then Secretary-General of the Ministry of Defense from 1987 to 1988. He was appointed as Minister of Farmers' Cooperative Action on August 23, 1988 and remained in that position until 1990. After that stint in the government, he was National Coordinator of the Fight Against Desertification in Burkina Faso (LUCODEB) Programme from 1991 to 1993.

Sedego was later appointed as Minister of the Environment and Quality of Life on January 17, 2004. Four years later, on March 23, 2008, he was moved from the post of Minister of the Environment to that of Minister of Agriculture, Water and Fisheries Resources.

In 2013, Prime Minister Luc Adolphe Tiao re-shuffled the cabinet, splitting the Ministry of Agriculture, Hydraulics and Fishery Resources into the Ministry of Agriculture and Food Security, headed by Mahama Zoungrana, and the Ministry of Water, Water Facilities and Sanitation, headed by Mamounata Belem. Sedego was not retained in the new cabinet.
