= Antoinette Ouédraogo =

Burkinabé lawyer and women's rights and environmental activist

Antoinette Nongoba Ouédraogo
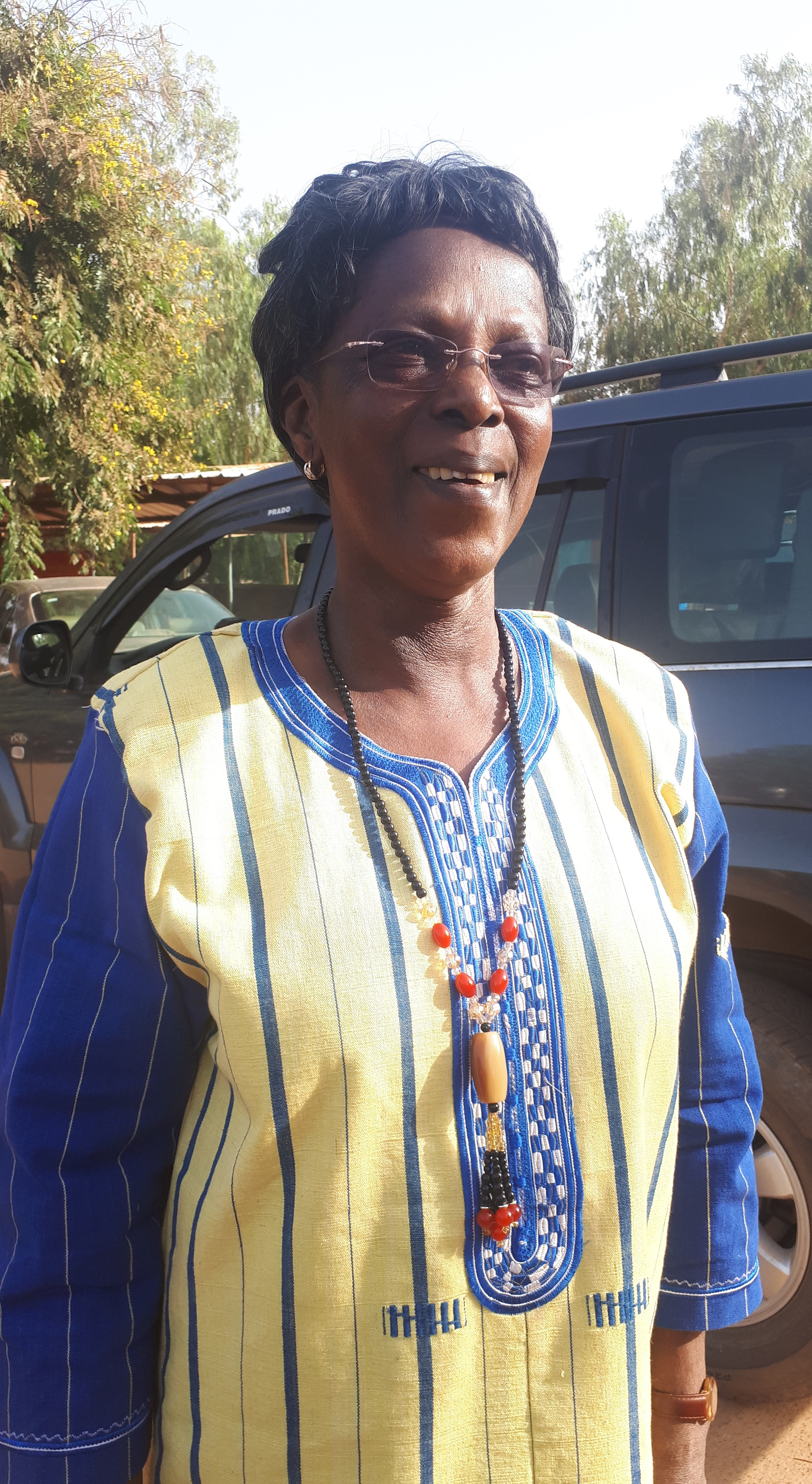
- Education: Young Girls' College of Loumbila
- Occupations: Lawyer, activist
- Known for: First woman lawyer in Burkina Faso

Antoinette Nongoba Ouédraogo is a Burkinabé lawyer and women's rights and environmental activist, and was the first woman in Burkina Faso to become a lawyer.

== Early life ==
Ouédraogo was educated at the Young Girls' College of Loumbila, in Loumbila, the capital of the Loumbila Department in Oubritenga Province.

== Career ==
On 17 June 2006, Ouédraogo was elected president of the bar in Burkina Faso. On International Women's Day in 2007, she spoke out against violence towards women, especially rape. Ouédraogo is the president of the women's development association, and a member of a national climate change experts' group. She has stated that uncontrolled land clearances, poaching and the search for new grazing pastures are exacerbating climate change.

Ouédraogo is the Burkina Faso representative on the executive committee of the Global Shea Alliance. Ouédraogo is also representing the former government minister, General Djibrill Bassolé, who is suspected of leading a short-lived 2015 coup d’état, which destabilized Burkina Faso. In July 2017, the legal defence team had a "major victory", after a UN working group said that the detention of the former Minister was "arbitrary and illegal".

In May 2017, Ouédraogo was representing Burkina Faso's former president Blaise Compaore (in absentia) and his cabinet in a trial, after he fled the country to the Ivory Coast during a popular revolt in 2014, as he attempted to extend his 27-year-rule. She led a walk out of the defence team, stating that the trial was in contravention of the country's constitution.

== See also ==
- First women lawyers around the world
