= Brahima Korbeogo =

Burkinabé footballer

Personal information
- Full name: Brahima Korbeogo
- Date of birth: January 23, 1975 (age 51)
- Place of birth: Ouagadougou, Upper Volta
- Height: 1.82 m (5 ft 11 1/2 in)
- Position: Defender

Team information
- Current team: Commune FC
- Number: 6

Youth career
- 1995–1997: Satellite FC

Senior career*
| Years | Team | Apps | (Gls) |
| 1998–2000 | Union Sportive des Forces Armées | 56 | (8) |
| 2000 | El-Ittihad El-Iskandary | 12 | (0) |
| 2001–2002 | Bani Yas Club | 25 | (0) |
| 2003–2006 | ASFA Yennega | 81 | (0) |
| 2006– | Commune FC | 63 | (0) |

International career
| 1996–2003 | Burkina Faso | 40 | (2) |
- * Club domestic league appearances and goals as of 16:33, 20 May 2008 (UTC)

Brahima Korbeogo (born 23 January 1975) is a Burkinabé footballer who last played for Commune FC.

== Career ==
Korbeogo previously played for Satellite FC, Union Sportive des Forces Armées, El-Ittihad El-Iskandary (Egypt), Bani Yas Club (United Arab Emirates), and ASFA Yennega.

== International ==
He was part of the Burkinabé 2000 African Nations Cup team, who finished bottom of group C in the first round of competition, thus failing to secure qualification for the quarter-finals. Korbeogo has currently played sixteen matches, his first game on January 13, 1999, and the last on October 13, 2002.
