= University of Pedagogical Sciences =

Cuban university

Coordinates: 23.04090°N 82.36979°W

Universidad de Ciencias Pedagógicas "Héctor Alfredo Pineda Zaldívar"
- Instituto Superior Pedagogico para la Ensenanza Tecnica y Profesional " Hector Pineda Zaldivar" (ISPET)
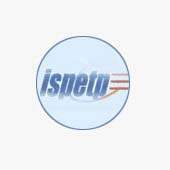
- Type: Public
- Established: 1972
- Rector: Dra. Odelaisis Deliz de los Santos
- Location: Havana, Cuba

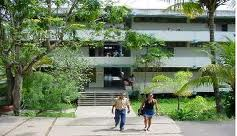
One of the main buildings

The University of Pedagogical Sciences "Hector Alfredo Pineda Zaldivar" (UCPETP) (Spanish: Universidad de Ciencias Pedagógicas Héctor Alfredo Pineda Zaldívar), originally named "Héctor Alfredo Pineda Zaldívar Higher Pedagogical Institute" (Spanish: Instituto Superior Pedagogico para la Ensenanza Tecnica y Profesional, ISPETP) is a higher education, post-graduate and doctoral research university located in Boyeros, Havana, Cuba. It has the mission to prepare professors capable of developing high level professionals in different areas of engineering. It works to become the national leader of scientific and technical-pedagogical excellence for the improvement of the Technical and Professional Education and for its leading role of the technical careers in the rest of the pedagogical institutions.

== History ==
The creation of the university has its origin in a project of the United Nations Educational, Scientific and Cultural Organization (UNESCO) requested by Cuban Government. It was originally named Higher Technical Pedagogical Institute of Technical Education (ISPET) and it was installed in the Center of Students of Agricultural Sciences (CEDCA), in the municipality of Boyeros. This project was included in the United Nations Development Program (PNUD) with the specification CUB 71-511. It began in the 1972-1973 academic year with an emerging training course. It is officially created in the course 1973-1974.

In the academic year 1976-1977 with the network of Pedagogical Institutes of the MINED, the center becomes the ISPETP and works with the Faculties of: Technology, Agricultural Sciences and Economic Sciences. The licentiate degree of all the specialties was imparted in the present Superior School of Management of the Industry Ministry and in some places of the Polytechnic "José Martí".

In 1979 the Faculty of Mechanics was approved. From 1986 the ISPETP was made with students graduated from the related specialties and is assigned the name of Héctor Alfredo Pineda Zaldívar, outstanding educator of the center that lost his life in the fulfillment of his professional duty.

In 1987, the creation of the Center's Scientific Council was approved. In 1991 arises the Center of Studies for Technical and Professional Pedagogy (CEPROF). From 1992-1993 the faculties merged in:

- Industrial Faculty.
- Faculty of Agricultural and Economic Sciences.

Due to the economic difficulties, faculties were created in Pedagogical Institutes in the rest of the country and the students were transferred to each of their provinces of origin.

The Institute is the only pedagogical university in Cuba, and also teaches Professional Pedagogy internationally.

== Organization ==
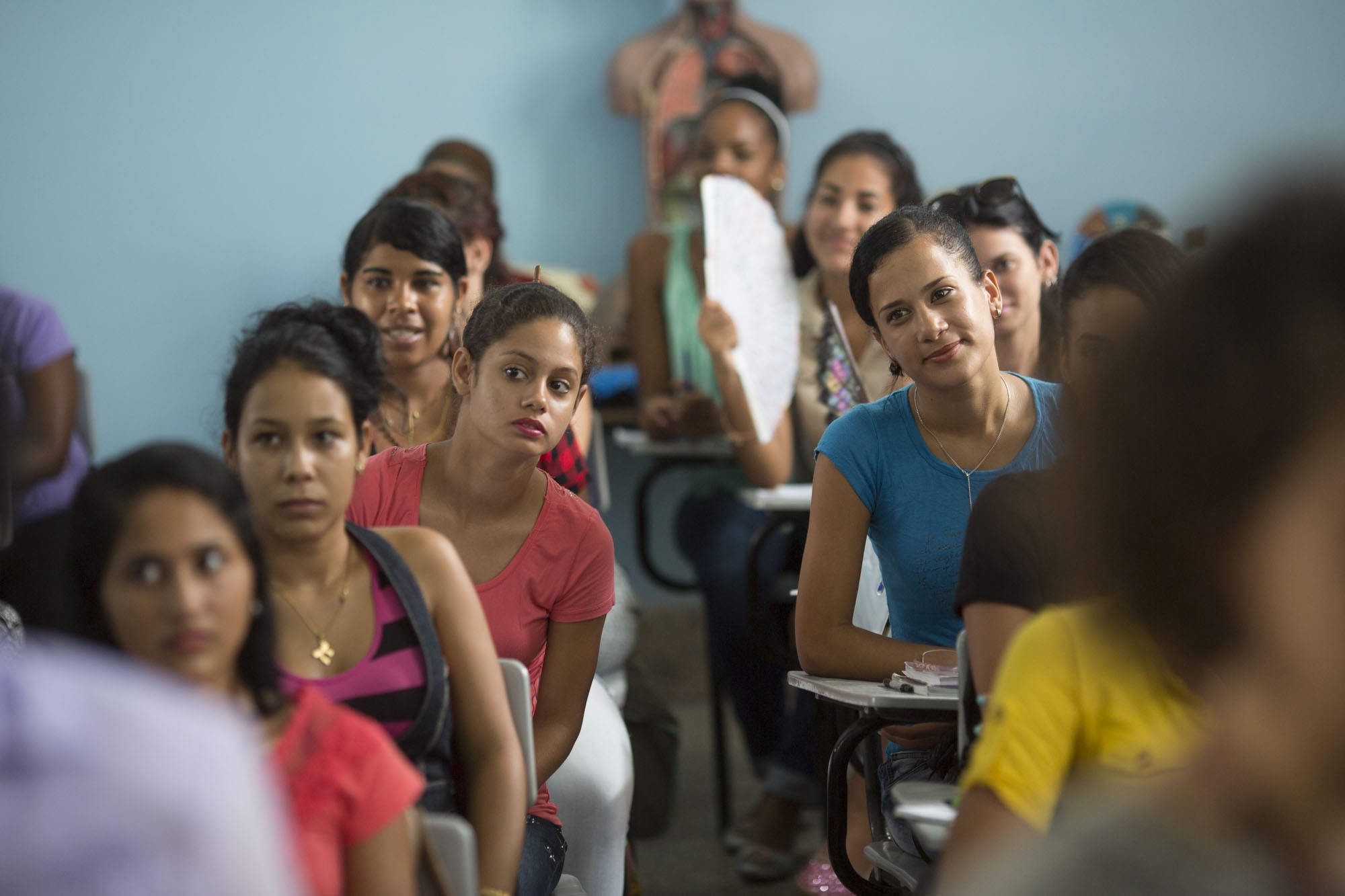
Students at the University of Pedagogical Sciences in 2016.

At present, the faculties are arranged as follows:

- Faculty of Mechanical Engineering
- Faculty of Electrical Engineering
- Faculty of Accounting
- Faculty of Agricultural Engineering
- Faculty of Computer Sciences
- Faculty of Civil Engineering

== Names and confusion ==
This University of Pedagogical Sciences is named after one of its professors: Héctor Alfredo Pineda Zaldívar, who fell in unequal combat in the Zumbe region, in the People's Republic of Angola where he collaborated as a teacher. The person after whom ISPETP is named is unknown to the outside world.

It was originally named Higher Technical Pedagogical Institute of Technical Education (ISPET). In the academic year 1976-1977 the name changed to Instituto Superior Pedagogico para la Ensenanza Tecnica y Profesional "Hector Pineda Zaldivar" (ISPETP) to reflect the evolution from Technical to Technical and Professional education.

Sometimes, ISPETP is written as University of Pedagogical Sciences (Spanish: Universidad de Ciencias Pedagógicas) in some English literature, such as journals, etc. It is still known as ISPETP, due to the popularity and easy pronunciation of that short name.

== UPC International Services ==
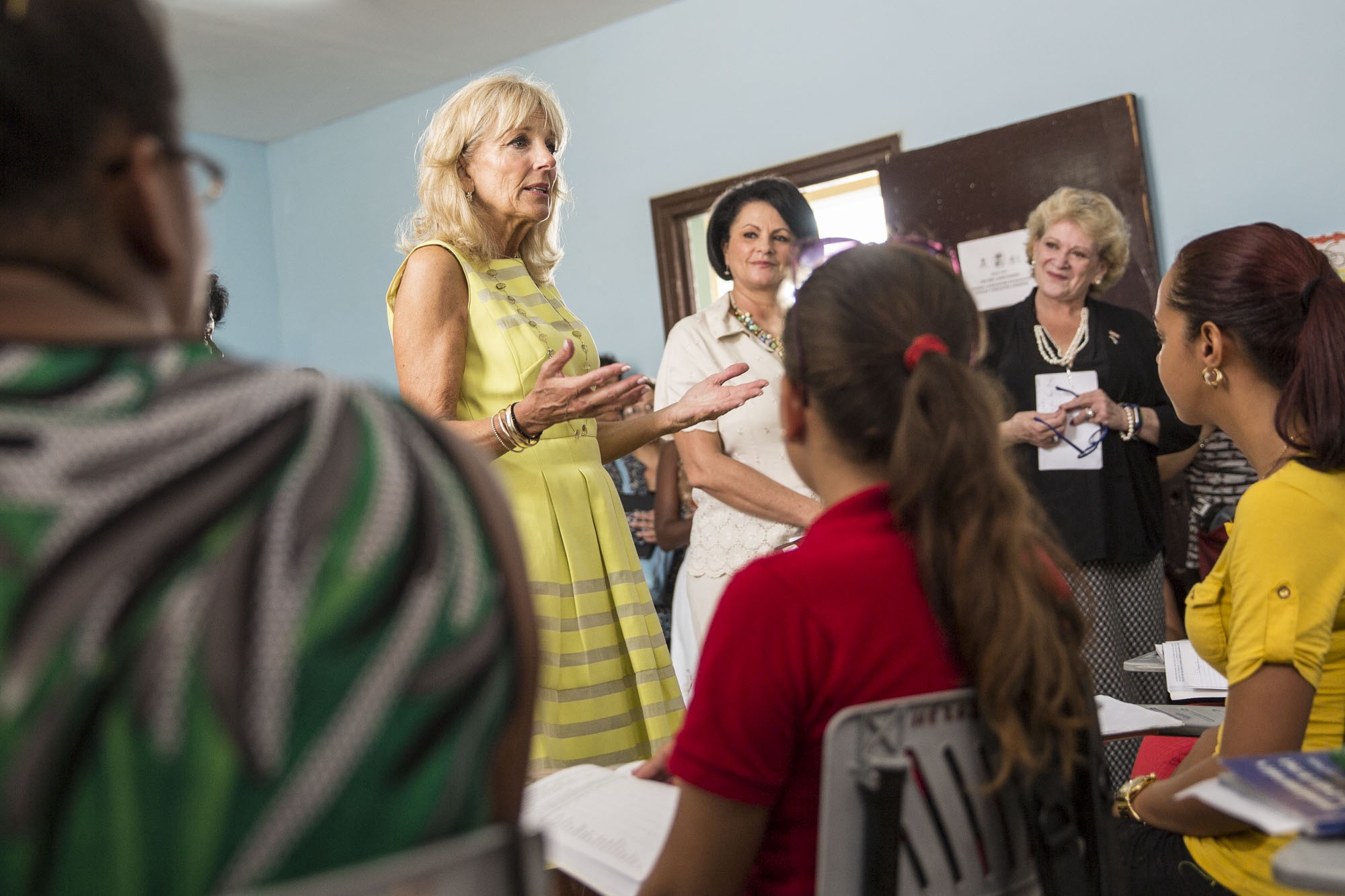
Jill Biden speaking at the university in 2016.

- Advising on technical aspects of the Pedagogical Process
- Masters in Professional Education
- Graduates
- Training
- Postgraduate courses
- Assistance in scientific research
- Scientific and educational events.

== Countries maintaining working relationships with the CPU ==
- Brazil
- Ecuador
- Bolivia
- Colombia
- Mexico
- Dominican Republic
- Belize
- Mozambique
- France

== Notable alumni ==
- Conrado Cogle "Bonko Qiñongo" (graduated engineer) Comedian
- Geonel Martin "Gustavito" (graduated engineer) Comedian
- ALEXANDER ORTIZ OCAÑA. Ph. D. en Educación (Doctor en Ciencias Pedagógicas)
- RAMZI HABER CUZAN Especialista de Transporte Aéreo Instituto de Aeronaútica Civil de Cuba (graduated Accounting)
- Esteban Machado Diaz (graduated engineer) Great in the cuban Plastic Art

== See also ==
- Education in Cuba
- Havana
- List of universities in Cuba
