= 2021 Hialeah shooting =

Mass shooting in Florida, U.S.

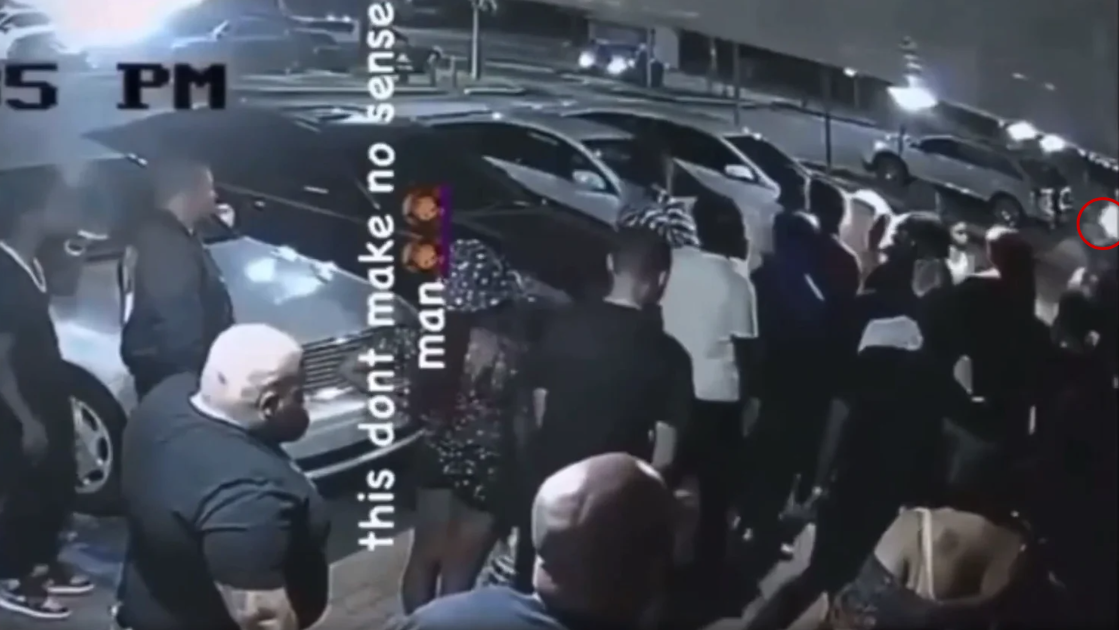
- CCTV footage of the first shot being fired
- Location: 25.94165°N 80.3256°W; Miami-Dade County, Florida, United States
- Date: May 30, 2021
- Attack type: Mass shooting, shootout
- Deaths: 3
- Injuries: 20
- Motive: Gang violence
- Accused: Warneric Buckner, Allen Chambers, Willie Hill, Jacarree Green, Eugene Holmes, Unknown Others
- Convictions: Davonte Barnes
- Litigation: Katherine Fernandez Rundle, Christopher Flanagan, Khalil Quinan
- Judge: Marisa Tinkler Mendez

On May 30, 2021, twenty-three people were shot, of whom three were killed, in a mass shooting outside a banquet hall in Miami-Dade County, Florida, United States. Some of the suspects in the shooting are still at large.

== Incident ==
The El Mula Banquet Hall was rented out for a hip hop concert. The concert was a Memorial Day weekend album release party that began on May 29 and featured live performances by local hip hop artists. The shooting took place around 12:30 am when two vehicles pulled up and the occupants began to open fire into the crowd.

One of the injured called his parents, who told reporters their son said the shooters wore ski masks and hoodies, and opened fire with no warning. Police say the shooting was targeted. Two 26-year-old men, Desmond Owens and Clayton Dillard III, died in the banquet hall. Another wounded victim, Shaniqua Peterson, 32, died in the hospital four days later.

They found 99 spent shell casings that where discharged from 9 different firearms at the scene of the shootout.

== Response ==
The Miami-Dade Police Director said that the shooting was a "targeted and cowardly act of gun violence". The Chief of the Miami Police Department, discussed the shooting with the media in connection to another shooting earlier in the week and claimed the two shootings were "an indication of the problem we have with the scourge of gun violence in this country that we need to do much more at a federal level to stop."

Governor Ron DeSantis also issued a statement which offered condolences to those killed and injured, and that the perpetrators would be brought to swift justice. In response to DeSantis's condolences, state Senator Shevrin Jones urged DeSantis to sit down with state Democrats and discuss ways of addressing gun violence, saying, "Thoughts and prayers have been going on for years and thoughts and prayers haven't done a damn thing inside the Black community - or any community when it comes to gun violence."

Local businessman and television personality Marcus Lemonis offered a $100,000 reward to help authorities arrest and convict the suspects in the case. The Bureau of Alcohol, Tobacco, Firearms, and Explosives later added $25,000 to the reward, for a total of $125,000.

== Arrests ==
On September 24, 2021, police arrested 22-year-old Miami Gardens resident Davonte Barnes (born 1998/1999) in connection to being the gunmen's lookout. A couple of weeks later on October 7, 20-year-old Miami Gardens resident Warneric Buckner (born 2000/2001) was arrested and confessed to being one of the gunmen. On December 15, 2021, all charges against him were dropped, because police continued to question him after he had requested an attorney, and he had given an incriminating statement before his attorney had arrived, in violation of his Miranda rights. Buckner would later be charged with the unrelated murder of a six-year-old girl, in another mass shooting outside a party. In November 2023, Davonte Barnes was sentenced to life in prison after he was convicted of three counts of second degree murder and 20 counts of second degree attempted murder two months earlier.

On June 13, 2024, four individuals were arrested and charged in connection with the 2021 mass shooting. The suspects, identified as 30-year-old Allen Gregory Chambers Jr. of Miami (born 1993/94), 27-year-old Willie Zavon Hill of Opa-locka (born 1996/1997), 30-year-old Jacarree Brian Green of Miami Gardens (born 1993/1994), and 22-year-old Eugene Anthony Holmes of Miami-Dade (born 2001/2002), faced multiple charges, including three counts of first-degree murder, 20 counts of first-degree attempted murder, and one count of conspiracy to commit murder. Hill was already in federal custody for possession of a firearm by a convicted felon at the time of his arrest, and was currently serving his sentence at FCI Coleman Medium. The arrest warrants were authorized by Assistant Miami-Dade State Attorney Khalil Quinan, with Miami-Dade Police investigator Alexandra Turnes leading the investigation. During a press conference, Miami-Dade State Attorney Katherine Fernandez Rundle emphasized that the attack was premeditated and targeted performers and attendees at the event. These arrests come three years after the initial incident and follow the earlier conviction of Barnes. The investigation remains ongoing, with Fernandez Rundle indicating that additional suspects may be charged in the future.

== See also ==
- Domestic terrorism in the United States
- Gun violence in the United States
- Orlando nightclub shooting
- List of mass shootings in the United States in 2021
- Carol City murders
