= Salvador Yaméogo =

Burkinabé politician

Salvador Yaméogo is a politician and a former Minister of Transportation and Tourism in the government of Burkina Faso.
