= List of political parties in Burkina Faso =

This article lists political parties in Burkina Faso. Since gaining independence as the Republic of Upper Volta in 1960, the political system has been volatile, moving from a multi-party system to a single party to no parties at all, depending on the ruling regime.

On 30 January 2026, junta leader Ibrahim Traoré formally dissolved and banned all political parties in the country.

== Historical parties and alliances ==
=== Parties that were represented in parliament of 2020 until 2022 ===
Party	Abbr.	Leader	Ideology	Assembly	Years active
People's Movement for Progress; Mouvement du peuple pour le progrès	MPP	Roch Marc Christian Kaboré	Social democracy Progressivism	56 / 127	2014–2026
Congress for Democracy and Progress; Congrès pour la démocratie et le progrès	CDP	Eddie Komboïgo	Social democracy	20 / 127	1996–2026
New Era for Democracy; Nouveau temps pour la démocratie	NTD	Vincent Dabilgou	Social democracy	13 / 127	2015–2026
Union for Progress and Reform; Union pour le progrès et le changement	UPC	Zéphirin Diabré	Big tent Liberal democracy	12 / 127	2010–2026
Union for Rebirth / Sankarist Party; Union pour la renaissance/Parti sankariste	UNIR/PS	Bénéwendé Stanislas Sankara	Sankarism; Socialism	5 / 127	2000–2021
Movement for the Future Burkina Faso; Mouvement pour le Burkina du futur	MBF			4 / 127	
Alliance for Democracy and Federation – African Democratic Rally; Alliance pour la démocratie et la fédération/Rassemblement démocratique africain	RPI	Gilbert Noël Ouédraogo	Liberalism	3 / 127	1998–2026
Patriotic Rally for Integrity; Rassemblement patriotique pour l'intégrité	RPI			3 / 127	
Party for Development and Change; Parti pour le développement et le changement	PDC			3 / 127	
Act Together; Agir Ensemble	AE	Kadré Désiré Ouédraogo		2 / 127	
National Convention for Progress; Convention nationale pour le progrès	CNP			2 / 127	
Party for Democracy and Socialism/Metba; Parti pour la démocratie et le socialisme/Metba	PDS/Metba		Communism; Socialism	1 / 127	2012–2026
Pan-African Alliance for Refoundation; Alliance panafricaine pour la refondation	APR			1 / 127	
Progressives United for Renewal; Progressistes unis pour le renouveau	PUR			1 / 127	
Convergence for Progress and Solidarity-Generation 3 Convergence pour le progrès et la solidarité - Génération 3	CPS-G3			1 / 127	

=== Contested 2020 election ===
- Alternative Faso (Le Faso Autrement, FA)
- Movement for Democracy in Africa (Mouvement pour la Démocratie en Afrique, MDA)
- National Rebirth Party (Parti de la Renaissance Nationale, PAREN)
- New Alliance of Faso (Nouvelle Alliance du Faso, NAFA)
- Patriotic Front for Change (Front Patriotique pour le Changement, FPC)
- Union for the Republic (Union pour la République, UPR)

=== Other parties ===
- Alliance for Democracy and Progress / Party of National Reconciliation (Alliance pour la Démocratie et le Progrès / Parti de Réconciliation Nationale, ADP/PRN)
- Alliance for Progress and Freedom (Alliance pour le Progrès et la Liberté. APL)
- Alliance for Rebirth, Democracy and Integration (Alliance pour la Renaissance, la Démocratie et l’Intégration, ARDI)
- Alliance for the Defense of Democracy and Progress (Alliance pour la Défense de la Démocratie et le Progrès, ADDP)
- Alliance of Progressive Forces (Alliance des Forces Progressistes, AFP)
- Burkinabè Liberal Party (Parti Libéral Burkinabè, PLB)
- Burkinabé Party for Refoundation (Parti Burkinabè pour la Refondation, PBR)
- Citizens' League of Builders (Ligue Citoyenne des Batisseurs, LCB)
- Convention for Democracy and Federation (Convention pour la Démocratie et la Fédération, CDF)
- Convention for Democracy and Freedom (Convention pour la Démocratie et la Liberté, CDL)
- Convergence for Social Democracy (Convergence pour la Démocratie Sociale, CDS)
- Convergence of Hope (Convergence de l'Espoir)
- Democratic and Popular Rally (Rassemblement Démocratique et Populaire, RDP)
- Democratic Awakening of the Masses (Réveil Démocratique des Masses, RDM)
- Democratic Organization for the Defense of Nature (Organisation Démocratique pour la Défense de la Nature, ODDN)
- Democratic Union of Faso (Union Démocratique du Faso, UDF)
- Ecologist Party for the Development of Burkina (Parti Ecologiste pour le Développement du Burkina, PEDB)
- Front for Integration and Social Development (Front pour l’Intégration et le Développement Social, F/IDS)
- Group of Republican Democrats (Groupe des Démocrates Républicain, GDR)
- Liberal Party of Burkina (Parti Libéral du Burkina, PLB)
- Movement for Democracy and Rebirth (Mouvement pour la Démocratie et la Renaissance, MDR)
- Movement of the Union of the Democratic Peasants for Progress (Mouvement de l’Union des Paysans Démocrates pour le Progrès, MUPDP)
- National Convention for Renewal / New Era (Convention Nationale pour le Renouveau / Ère Nouvelle, CNR/EN)
- National Convention of Progressive Democrats (Convention Nationale des Démocrates Progressistes, CNDP)
- National Council for Democracy (French: Conseil national pour la Démocratie), re. 2015 Burkinabe coup d'état
- National Democratic Party (Burkina Faso) (Parti Démocratique National, PDN)
- National League for Democracy, the Coalized Movements for Democratic Alternance in Burkina Faso (Ligue Nationale pour la Démocratie, les Mouvements Coalisés pour l’Alternance Démocratique au Burkina Faso, LINAD/MOCLAD/BF)
- National Patriots' Party (Parti National des Patriotes, PNP)
- National Salvation Front (Front National du Salut, FNS)
- National Union for Democracy and Development (Union Nationale pour la Démocratie et le Développement, UNDD)
- National Union for Democracy and Progress (Union Nationale pour la Démocratie et le Progrès, UNDP)
- National Union for Independence and Solidarity (Union Nationale pour l’Indépendance et la Solidarité, UNIS)
- New Alliance Party (Parti de la Nouvelle Alliance, PNA)
- New Political Rally (Rassemblement Politique Nouveau, RPN)
- New Social Democracy (Nouvelle Démocratie Sociale, NDS)
- Organisation for Democracy and Labour (Organisation pour la Démocratie et le Travail, ODT)
- Pan-African Movement of Faso (Mouvement Panafricain du Faso, MPF)
- Party for Concord and Progress (Parti pour la Concorde et le Progrès, PCP)
- Party for Democracy and Progress / Socialist Party (Parti pour la Démocratie et le Progrès / Parti Socialiste, PDP/PS)
- Party for Progress and Social Development (Parti pour le Progrès et le Développement Social, PPDS)
- Party of Independence, Labour and Justice (Parti de l’indépendance, du travail et de la justice, PITJ)
- Party of Progress and for National Renewal (Parti du Progrès pour le Renouveau National, PPRN)
- Party of the Independent Forces for Development (Parti des Forces Indépendantes pour le Développement, PFID)
- Patriotic Movement for Renewal (Mouvement Patriotique pour le Renouveau, MPR)
- Patriotic Movement of the Popular Front and the African Integration (Mouvement Patriotique du Front Populaire et de l’Intégration Africaine, MPFP/IA)
- Patriotic Movement of Young Democrats (Mouvement Patriotique des Jeunes Démocrates, MPJD)
- Patriotic Rally of Faso (Rassemblement Patriotique du Faso, RPF)
- People's Council for Action (Conseil du Peuple pour l’Action, COPAC)
- People's Movement for Socialism / Federal Party (Mouvement du Peuple pour le Socialisme / Parti Fédéral, MPS/PF)
- Peasants' and Workers' Alliance of Burkina (Alliance des Paysans et Ouvriers du Burkina, APOB)
- Progress Party for National Renewal (Parti du Progrès pour le Renouveau National, PPRN)
- Rally for Popular Prosperity (Rassemblement pour la Prospérité Populaire/GWASIFI, RPP/GWASIGI)
- Rally of Democrats for the Faso (Rassemblement des Démocrates pour le Faso, RDF)
- Rally of Independent Forces / Youth Party of Burkina (Rassemblement des Forces Indépendantes / Parti des Jeunes du Burkina, RFI/PJD)
- Rally of Republicans (Rassemblement des Républicains, RDR)
- Rally of the Ecologists of Burkina (Rassemblement des Écologistes du Burkina, RDEB)
- Refusal Front (Front de Refus)
- Republican Democratic Front (Front Démocratique Républicain, FDR)
- Republican National Party / Just Way (Parti National Républicain / Juste Voie, PNR/JV)
- Republican Party for Integration (Parti Républicain pour l'Intégration, PARI)
- Sankarist Democratic Front (Front Démocratique Sankariste, FDS)
- Social Forces Front (Front des Forces Sociales, FFS)
- Social Union of Burkina (Union Sociale du Burkina, USB)
- Socialist Peasants Party (Parti Socialiste Paysan, PSP)
- Greens of Burkina (Les Verts du Burkina)
- Unified Socialist Party (Parti Socialiste Unifié, PSU)
- Union for Democracy and Development (Union pour la Démocratie et le Développement, UDD)
- Union of Democratic and Progressive Forces (Uion des Forces Démocratiques et Progressistes, UFDP)
- Union of Democratic Forces (Union des Forces Démocratiques, UFD)
- Union of Democratic Peasants / Labour Party (Union des Paysans Démocrates / Parti du Travail, UPD/PT)
- Union of Independent Democrats and Progressives (Union des Démocrates et Progressistes Indépendants, UDPI)
- Union of Independent Democrats (Union des Démocrates Indépendants, UDI)
- Union of Liberals for Democracy (Union des Libéraux pour la Démocratie)
- Union of Patriots for Development (Union des Patriotes pour le Développement, UPD)
- Union of Progressive Forces (Union des Forces Progressistes, UFP)
- Union of Republicans (Union des Républicains, UDR)
- Union of the Renewal Forces (Union des Forces pour le Renouveau, UFR)
- Voltaic Revolutionary Communist Party (Parti Communiste Révolutionnaire Voltaïque, PCRV)

=== Other alliances ===
- African Convention for Democracy (Convention Africaine pour la Démocratie, CAD)
- Collective of Democratic Mass Organizations and Political Parties (Collectif des Organisations Démocratiques de Masse et de Partis Politiques, CODMPP)
- Convention of Democratic Forces (Convention des Forces Démocratiques, CFD)
- Coordination of Extra-parliamentary Parties (Coordination des Partis Extra Parlementaires, COPEP)
- February 14th Group (Groupe du 14 Février, G14)
- United Burkinabè Opposition (Opposition Burkinabè Unie, OBU)
- African Independence Party (Parti Africain de l'Indépendance, PAI)
- African Independence Party (Touré) (Parti African de l'Indépendance, PAI (Touré))
- African Popular Movement (Mouvement Populaire Africain, MPA)
- Alliance for Democracy and Social Emancipation (Alliance pour la Démocratie et l'Émancipation Sociale, ADES)
- Alliance for Youth and Social Integration (Alliance pour la Jeunesse et l’Intégration Sociale, AJIS)
- Alliance of Republicans for Burkina Faso (Alliance des Républicains du Burkina Faso, ARBF)
- Burkinabé Bolshevik Party (Parti Bolchévique Burkinabè, PBB)
- Burkinabè Communist Group (Groupe Communiste Burkinabè, GCB)
- Burkinabè Revolutionary Progressive Party (Parti Progressiste Révolutionnaire Burkinabé, PPRB)
- Burkinabè Socialist Bloc (Bloc Socialiste Burkinabè, BSB)
- Burkinabè Socialist Party (Parti Socialiste Burkinabè, PSB)
- Conscience for a Democratic Alternative (Conscience pour une Alternative Démocratique, CAD)
- Current of Democrats Faithful to the Ideal of Thomas Sankara (Courant des Démocrates Fidèles à l'Idéal de Thomas Sankara)
- Democratic Action Group (Groupe de l'Action Démocratique, GAD)
- Democratic Front for Social Wellbeing (Front Démocratique pour le Bien Etre Social, FDBS)
- Democratic Union of Burkina (Union Démocratique du Burkina, UDB)
- Group of Democrats for the Rally of Progressive Forces (Groupe des Démocrates pour le Rassemblement des Forces Progressistes, GDRFP)
- Ecological Party for Progress (Parti Écologiste pour le Progrès, PEP)
- Ecological Party for the Development of Burkina (Parti Écologiste pour le Développement du Burkina, PEDB)
- For the Party (Pour le Parti)
- Group for the Unity of Marxist-Leninists (Groupe pour l'Unité des Marxistes-Léninistes, GUML)
- Group of Revolutionary Democrats (Groupe des Démocrates Révolutionnaires, GDR)
- Labour Party of Burkina (Parti du Travail du Burkina, PTB)
- League for African Integration (Ligue pour l’Intégration Africaine, LIA)
- League for Progress and Development (Ligue pour le Progrès et le Développement, LPD)
- Marxist-Leninist Group (Groupe Marxiste-Léniniste)
- Movement for Socialist Democracy (Mouvement pour la Démocratie Socialiste, MDS)
- Movement for Tolerance and Progress (Mouvement pour la Tolérance et le Progrès, MTP)
- Movement of Progressive Democrats (Mouvement des Démocrates Progressistes, MDP)
- National Convention of Progressive Patriots / Social Democratic Party (Convention Nationale des Patriotes Progressistes / Parti Social-Démocrate, CNPP/PSD)
- National Liberation Movement (Mouvement de Libération Nationale, MLN)
- National Union for the Defense of Democracy (Union Nationale pour la Défense de la Démocratie, UNDD)
- Organization for Popular Democracy - Labour Movement (Organisation pour la Démocratie Populaire - Mouvement du Travail, ODP-MT)
- Party Burkinabè Democratique (Parti Démocratique Burkinabé, PDB)
- Party for Democracy and Progress (Parti pour la Démocratie et le Progrès, PDP)
- Party for Democracy and Rally (Parti pour la Démocratie et le Rassemblement, PDR)
- Party for Democracy and Socialism (Parti pour la Démocratie et le Socialisme, PDS)
- Party for Progress, Freedom and Development (Parti pour le Progrès la Liberté et le Développement, PPLD)
- Party for the Defense of Democracy (Parti pour la Défense de la Démocratie, PDP)
- Party of Action for the Liberalism in Solidarity (Parti de l’Action pour le Libéralisme Solidaire, PACT/LS)
- Party of Independents (Parti des Indépendants)
- Party of Social Democracy (Parti de la Démocratie Sociale, PDS)
- Party of Social Progress (Parti du Progrès Social, PPS)
- Patriotic League for Development (Ligue patriotique pour le développement, LIPAD)
- Patriotic Movement for Freedom and Development (Mouvement Patriotique pour la Liberté et le Développement, MPLD)
- People's Unity Party (Parti de l’Unité Populaire, PUP)
- Popular Action Grouping (Groupement d'Action Populaire)
- Popular and Democratic Rally Thomas Sankara (Rassemblement Démocratique et Populaire Thomas Sankara, RDP)
- Posadist Fourth International Group (Groupe Quatrième Internationale Posadiste)
- Rally for the Development of Burkina (Rassemblement pour le Développement du Burkina, RDB)
- Rally of Independent Social Democrats (Rassemblement des Socio-démocrates Indépendants, RSI)
- Republican Party for Liberty (Parti Républicain pour la Liberté, PRL)
- Republican Party of Burkina (Parti Républicain du Burkina, PRB)
- Revolutionary and Democratic Alliance (Alliance Démocratique et Révolutionnaire, ADR)
- Revolutionary Military Organization (Organisation Militaire Révolutionnaire, OMR)
- Revolutionary Party of Young Democrats of Burkina (Parti Révolutionnaire des Jeunes Démocrates du Burkina, PRJDB)
- Revolutionary Socialist Party (Parti Révolutionnaire Socialiste, PRS)
- Revolutionary Workers Party of Burkina (Parti Révolutionnaire des Travaillistes du Burkina, PRTB)
- Revolutionary Workers' Party (Parti Ouvrier Révolutionnaire, POR)
- Sankarist Movement (Mouvement Sankariste)
- Sankarist Pan-African Convention (Convention Panafricaine Sankariste, CPS)
- Social Party for the Emancipation of the African Masses (Parti Social pour l'Émancipation des Masses Africaines)
- Union for Democracy and Social Progress (Union pour la Démocratie et le Progrès Social, UDPS)
- Union of Burkinabè Communists (Union des Communistes Burkinabè)
- Union of Communist Struggles (Union de Luttes Communistes)
- Union of Communist Struggles - Reconstructed (Union de Luttes Communistes - Reconstruite)
- Union of Communist Struggles - The Flame (Union de Luttes Communistes - La Flamme)
- Union of Democrats and Patriots of Burkina (Union des Démocrates et Patriotes du Burkina, UDPB)
- Union of Greens for the Development of Burkina Faso (Union des verts pour le Développement du Burkina; UVDB)
- Union of Social Democrats (Union des Sociaux-Démocrates, UDS)
- Union of the Democratic Left (Union de la gauche démocratique, UGD)
- Union of the Progressive Forces of Burkina (Union des Forces Progressistes du Burkina, UFPB)
- United Party of Social Democracy (Parti de la Démocratie Sociale Unifié, PDSU)
- Voltaic Communist Organization (Organisation Communiste Voltaique, OCV)
- Voltaic Democratic Movement (Parti Social pour l'Émancipation des Masses Africaines)
- Voltaic Democratic Union (Mouvement Démocratique Voltaïque)
- Voltaic Labour Party (Parti Travailliste Voltaïque)
- Voltaic Progressive Front (Front Progressiste Voltaïque, FPV)
- Voltaic Progressive Union (Union Progressiste Voltaïque, UPV)
- Voltaic Regroupment Movement (Mouvement de Regroupement Voltaïque)
- Voltaic Union (Union Voltaïque)
- Change 2005 (Alternance 2005)
- Coalition of Democratic Forces (Coalition des Forces Démocratiques, CFD)
- Dialogue of the Burkinabè Opposition (Concertation de l'Opposition Burkinabé, COB)
- Convention of Progress Forces (Convention des Forces du Progrès, CFP)
- Democratic Forces for Progress (Forces Démocratiques pour le Progrès, FDP)
- Popular Front (Front Populaire)
- Republican Front (Front républicain)
- Revolutionary National Council (Conseil National Révolutionnaire, CNR)
- Sankarist Front (Front Sankariste)
- Unified Democratic Party (Parti Démocratique Unifié, PDU)
- United Forces (Forces Unies, FU)
- Union of Sankarist Forces (Union des Forces Sankaristes, UFS)
- Voltaic Solidarity (Solidarité Voltaïque, SV)

== See also ==
- Lists of political parties
