= Popular Front (Burkina Faso) =

Popular Front Front Populaire
- Leader: Arsène Bongnessan Yé
- Founded: 15 October 1987 (37 years, 305 days)
- Dissolved: 6 February 1996 (29 years, 191 days)
- Merged into: Congress for Democracy and Progress
- Ideology: Communism; Marxism–Leninism; Factions; Social democracy

The Popular Front (French: Front Populaire) was a political alliance in Burkina Faso.

The FP was founded in October 1987 by that country's president, Blaise Compaoré, immediately after he came to power in a military coup d'état. The first member parties of the FP were the Union of Burkinabé Communists (UCB), Burkinabé Communist Group (GCB) and the Union of Communist Struggles – The Flame (ULC-La Flamme).

In early 1991 the member parties were the

- Organization for Popular Democracy – Labour Movement (ODP-MT)
- Rally of Social-Democrat Independents (RSDI)
- National Convention of Progressive Patriots–Social Democratic Party (CNPP/PSD)
- Union of Democrats and Patriots of Burkina (UDPB)
- Burkinabé Communist Group (GCB)
- Group of Patriotic Democrats (GDP)
- Movement of Progressive Democrats (MDP)
- Group of Revolutionary Democrats (GDR)
- Union of Social Democrats (USD)
- African Independence Party (PAI)

In 1995 member parties were the

- Organization for Popular Democracy – Labour Movement (ODP-MT)
- Movement of Progressive Democrats (MDP)
- Union of Democrats and Patriots of Burkina (UDPB)
- Rally of Social-Democrat Independents (RSDI)

The leader of the FP was Arsène Bongnessan Yé.
