= Kanidoua Naboho =

Burkinabé politician (born 1952)

Kanidoua Naboho (born 1952) is a Burkinabé politician who served as First Vice-president of the National Assembly of Burkina Faso until 2014. He was previously a minister in the government during the late 1980s and early 1990s.

== Life and career ==
Naboho was born in Houndé, located in the Tuy Province of Burkina Faso's Hauts Bassins Region. After attending school in Burkina Faso, he studied at Cheikh Anta Diop University in Dakar and graduated with a degree in medicine. Back in Burkina Faso, he became the head doctor at the medical center of Tougan in 1981, then Provincial Director of Health in Gourma in 1984. Later, he was appointed to the government and served as Minister of the Civil Service, Labor and Social Security from 1988 to 1989, then as Minister of Health and Social Action from 1989 to 1990.

Naboho was elected to the National Assembly in the May 1992 parliamentary election. On 19 June 1992, Naboho was appointed as a Minister of State (without portfolio); he was subsequently appointed as Minister of State for Territorial Administration in 1993 and was moved to the post of Minister of State for Defense in 1994. He was not included the government that was named on 11 June 1995. In the May 1997 parliamentary election, he was elected to the National Assembly as a candidate of the Congress for Democracy and Progress (CDP).

In the May 2007 parliamentary election, he was again elected to the National Assembly as a CDP candidate, and he became the First Vice-president of the National Assembly.

Naboho was designated as the CDP's Deputy National Executive Secretary, in charge of political orientation, at the CDP's fifth congress, held in March 2012. In the December 2012 parliamentary election, he was re-elected to the National Assembly, and he was re-elected to his post as First Vice-president of the National Assembly in January 2013.
