= Watamou Lamien =

Burkinabé politician and journalist

Watamou Lamien

Watamou Lamien was a Burkinabé politician and journalist.

== Political Background ==
He had a leading role at the Voltan National Radio in the years leading up to the 4 August 1983 coup d'état. Lamien would head the Union of Burkinabé Communists (UCB), one of the parties within the revolutionary government. He served as Minister of Information and Culture between 1984 and 1986, and as Minister of Transport and Communications from 1987 until his death in 1988. Whilst officially he perished in a car accident, there have been significant speculation regarding the circumstances of his death.

== Journalist and PCRV cadre ==
Lamien studied in Strasbourg. Upon his return to Upper Volta, he began working as a journalist at the Voltan National Radio in 1979. After three months he was promoted to editor-in-chief at the Voltan National Radio. He was a member of the clandestine Voltan Revolutionary Communist Party (PCRV).

Through his role in the radio, during the period of late 1981 and early 1982 he was frequently in contact with the Secretary of State for Information, Captain Thomas Sankara. Through Lamien, the organization of radical young military officers called ROC communicated with the PCRV.

== In the revolutionary government ==
Lamien was named as Minister of Information and Culture in September 1984, and would remain in this role until August 1986. On 10 August 1984 Lamien took part in the founding of the Union of Burkinabé Communists (UCB), and was included in the permanent secretariat of the new party. Lamien would later replace Pierre Ouédraogo as general secretary of UCB. Lamien would also be appointed as political secretary of the National Revolutionary Council (CNR). He was a member of the Political Bureau of the CNR. On 4 September 1987 Lamien was named as Minister for Transport and Communications.

== Death ==
Through his role in the government machinery, Lamien was able to secure state financial support for several African film-makers. In 1988 he died, per official reports in a car crash en route to the set of the film Yaaba (one of the movies that he had mobilized financial support for). Yaaba was later dedicated to Lamien. There were significant rumours that the death of Lamien had not been accidental, but that he had been assassinated as part of the internal struggles in the Popular Front regime. Lamien's body was never handed over to his family. Per Bruno Jaffré Lamien had been, along with Clément Oumarou Ouédraogo (who was killed by a grenade), the only influential civilian politicians resisting the rightward shift of the Burkinabé government.
