= Bognessan Arsène Yé =

Burkinabé politician (1957–2024)

Bognessan Arsène Yé (10 October 1957 – 30 January 2024) was a Burkinabé politician who rose to power through a military coup and was President of the Assembly of People's Deputies of Burkina Faso from 1992 to 1997, President of the Congress for Democracy and Progress (CDP) from 1996 to 1999, and a Minister of State from 1997 to 2000. He was appointed Minister of State for Relations with Parliament and Political Reform in April 2011.

== Life and career ==
Yé, a military doctor, was born in Bagassi. He joined the Political Bureau of the National Council of the Revolution (CNR) in 1986. After the October 1987 coup, in which Blaise Compaoré took power, Yé became the National Secretary-General of the Committees for the Defense of the Revolution while also a member of the CNR with the rank of Minister. After the Committees for the Defense of the Revolution were replaced by the Revolutionary Committees on 17 March 1988, he served as National Coordinator while holding the rank of Minister and participating in the Council of Ministers from March 1988 to March 1989. Subsequently, he was included on the Executive Committee of the Popular Front as National Secretary for Organization from March 1990 to March 1991, and on 2 May 1990, he was appointed President of the Constitutional Commission, which was responsible for drafting a new constitution. The Commission completed its work in October 1990, and the constitution was adopted on 2 June 1991.

In the May 1992 parliamentary election, Yé was elected to the Assembly of People's Deputies; he was then elected as President of the Assembly of People's Deputies on 17 June 1992, holding that post until 1997. Additionally, from February 1993 to February 1996, he was President of the Organisation for Popular Democracy/Labour Movement (ODP/MT); the Congress for Democracy and Progress (CDP) was created in February 1996, replacing the ODP/MT, and Yé was President of the CDP from February 1996 to October 1999.

Yé was re-elected to the National Assembly in the May 1997 parliamentary election; following the election, he was Minister of State at the Presidency from June 1997 to January 1999, Minister of State for Agriculture from January 1999 to October 1999, and Minister of State for the Environment from October 1999 to November 2000. He was elected to the National Assembly in the May 2002 parliamentary election on the CDP's national list and again won a seat in the May 2007 parliamentary election as a CDP candidate in Balé Province. In 2008, he was President of the National Assembly's ad hoc Commission on the Financing of Political Parties, Electoral Campaigns, and the Status of the Opposition. This commission was created on 26 March 2008 and submitted its report two months later.

Yé died on 30 January 2024, at the age of 66.
