= Burkinabé Communist Group =

- Founded: 1983
- Dissolved: 1991
- Split from: Voltaic Revolutionary Communist Party
- Succeeded by: Movement for Socialist Democracy
- Ideology: Communism; Marxism-Leninism
- Political position: Far-left

The Burkinabè Communist Group (French: Groupe Communiste Burkinabè, GCB) was a Marxist-Leninist party in Burkina Faso.

== History ==
The GCB was formed as a splinter from the Voltaic Revolutionary Communist Party in August 1983, following the refusal of PCRV to support the revolutionary government of Thomas Sankara. The GCB was led by Jean-Marc Palm.

On 22 May 1985, the GCB, along with the Union of Burkinabé Communists, was re-invited into the Burkinabe governing coalition under the National Council for the Revolution (CNR) in order to counter the influence of Valère Somé within the faction.

In 1986 the GCB signed a declaration, together with the Union of Communist Struggles – Reconstructed (ULC-R), Union of Burkinabé Communists and Revolutionary Military Organization, calling for revolutionary unity.

In April 1987, the GCB, together with the ULC-R and La Flamme, formed a formal front against Sankara and Somé.

In 1989 the GCB left the government, following its refusal to join ODP/MT. The GCB turned clandestine. In April 1989 it split into two factions, one led by Salif Diallo joined the ODP/MT. The other, led by Jean-Marc Palm, became the Movement for Socialist Democracy (MDS) in March 1991.

== Members ==
- Jean-Marc Palm (founder)
- Salif Diallo
