= Flamme =

Flamme, la Flamme, Flammes, Flammen, may refer to:

- Flammé (yarn), a kind of novelty yarn
- Flammé (vexillology) (German geflammt), flag design

== People ==
- August Flamme (1884–1961), Canadian provincial politician from Alberta, Canada
- Michel Flamme, French head chef

== Broadcast, Stage and screen, music ==
- Die Flamme, original German title of the 1923 film The Flame directed by Ernst Lubitsch
- La flamme, 1926 French silent drama film
- Flammen (Schreker), opera on the Don Juan story
- Flammen (Schulhoff), a 1932 opera on a medieval legend
- Flammes, a 2002 compilation recorded by French pop act Niagara
- "Flamme" (song), a 1999 song by Slaï, French singer of Guadeloupe origin

== Others ==
- Union of Communist Struggles – The Flame (French: Union des Luttes Communistes – La Flamme), a Burkina Faso political party (also party organ La Flamme)

== See also ==
- Jeanne la Flamme or Joan of Arc, patron saint of France
- Feuer und Flamme, German artist Nena's fourth album
- Fer et Flamme, graphical adventure game for the Amstrad CPC
- "Vers la flamme" (literally "Toward the flame"), Alexander Scriabin music piece for piano, written in 1914
- LaFlamme (disambiguation), including the surname "la Flamme"
- Flame (disambiguation)
