= Convention of Progress Forces =

- Founded: January 1994
- Ideology: Socialism; Marxism; Social democracy

The Convention of Progress Forces (French: Convention des Forces du Progrès, CFP) was a political alliance in Burkina Faso. It was founded in January 1994 by the following political parties:

- Group of Patriotic Democrats
- Union of Social Democrats
- Movement of Progressive Democrats
- Union of Democrats and Patriots of Burkina
- Alliance for Progress and Freedom
- Patriotic Movement for Freedom and Development
- Movement for Socialist Democracy
- League for Progress and Development
- Revolutionary Workers Party of Burkina
