= Alain Bédouma Yoda =

Burkinabé politician

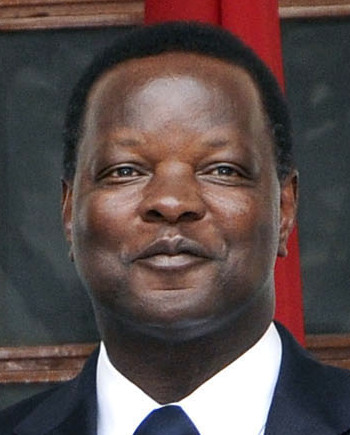
Alain Bédouma Yoda in 2009

Alain Bédouma Yoda (born 31 December 1951) is a Burkinabé politician. He served in the government of Burkina Faso as Minister of Transport and Tourism from 1997 to 2000, Minister of Trade from 2000 to 2002, Minister of Health from 2002 to 2008, and Minister of State for Foreign Affairs and Regional Cooperation from 2008 to 2011. He was President of the Parliamentary Group of the Congress for Democracy and Progress (CDP) from 2013 to 2014.

== Biography ==
Yoda was born in Komtoèga, and after studying in Burkina Faso, Cameroon, and France, he joined the civil service in 1978. From 1978 to 1985 he held various positions at the Ministry of Trade. He was appointed as Head of the Service of Legislation and Price Controls on 30 March 1978, then as Permanent Secretary-General for the Approval of Prices and Documentation on 31 July 1978; subsequently he became Director-General of Prices in April 1981, Director-General of the General Fund for the Equalization of Prices in March 1983, and Technical Adviser to the Minister of Trade in May 1985. Yoda was then Economic and Financial Adviser to the President of Burkina Faso, Thomas Sankara, from October 1985 to October 1987, as well as Director-General of the Naganagani air transport company from August 1986 to 1992. He was appointed to a post at the Secretariat-General of the Ministry of Transport and Communications in February 1992.

Yoda was elected to the Assembly of People's Deputies in the May 1992 parliamentary election as a candidate of the Rally of Social-Democrat Independents (RSI) in Boulgou; he was the only RSI candidate to win a seat. In the legislature, he served as President of the Finance and Planning Commission from 1996 to 1997. Yoda was re-elected to the National Assembly in the May 1997 parliamentary election, this time as a candidate of the ruling CDP, and was appointed to the government as Minister of Transport and Tourism on 10 June 1997; later, on 12 November 2000, his portfolio was changed to the Minister of Trade and the Promotion of Business and Crafts. Yoda was again elected to the National Assembly in the May 2002 parliamentary election, and following that election he was appointed as Minister of Health on 10 June 2002.

In the May 2007 parliamentary election, Yoda was elected to the National Assembly as a CDP candidate in Boulgou Province. He was promoted in ministerial rank after the election, becoming Minister of State for Health on 10 June 2007. Yoda was later moved to the post of Minister of State for Foreign Affairs and Regional Cooperation in the government named on 3 September 2008, replacing Djibril Bassolé.

After holding a succession of ministerial portfolios for nearly 14 years, Yoda was dismissed from the government on 21 April 2011. In the December 2012 parliamentary election, Yoda was again elected to the National Assembly as a CDP candidate. When the new legislature convened in late December 2012, Yoda was designated as head of an ad hoc commission composed of 35 deputies that was given the task of drawing up the National Assembly's rules and procedures for the new parliamentary term. The modified rules and procedures were unanimously adopted on 18 January 2013. Later in the same month, Yoda was designated as President of the CDP Parliamentary Group.
