= 1992 Burkinabé parliamentary election =

Elections

Parliamentary elections were held in Burkina Faso on 24 May 1992. They were the first parliamentary elections held in the country since 1978, and the first to be held under the 1991 constitution. The result was a victory for the Organization for Popular Democracy – Labour Movement, which won 78 of the 107 seats in the National Assembly.

== Background ==
In 1991 President Blaise Compaoré had allowed some openings towards a multi-party system, various political parties (many of them in alliance with the President's Organization for Popular Democracy - Labour Movement, ODP-MT) were established. But opposition parties were not satisfied with the pace of reforms. They called on the formation a sovereign national conference, which would govern the country until the holding of elections. Compaoré refused to bow to this demand, and presidential elections were held in December (boycotted by the opposition, and held amid violent protests). The elections had initially been called for 9 January 1991, but were postponed until 1992.

== Campaign ==
Between January and May 1992 the Coordination of Democratic Forces opposition coalition fell apart, with many of its constituents deciding to contest the elections. A total of 27 political parties eventually registered to compete in the elections, although only four had candidates in all provinces.

== Conduct ==
According to international observers the elections were largely free and fair, whereas opposition parties claimed that there had been massive fraud.

Voter turnout was 33.8%, higher than the 25% participation in the presidential elections in 1991.

== Results ==
Party	Votes	%	Seats
Organization for Popular Democracy – Labour Movement	590,808	48.46	78
National Convention of Progressive Patriots–Social Democratic Party	146,530	12.02	12
African Democratic Rally	138,168	11.33	6
Alliance for Democracy and Federation	105,950	8.69	4
African Independence Party	50,418	4.14	2
Burkinabé Socialist Bloc	28,667	2.35	0
Group of Patriotic Democrats	22,820	1.87	0
Movement for Tolerance and Progress	22,050	1.81	0
Burkinabé Socialist Party			1
Movement of Progressive Democrats			1
Movement for Socialist Democracy			1
Rally of Social-Democrat Independents			1
Union of Social Democrats			1
New Social Democracy			0
Union of Greens for the Development of Burkina			0
Total			107
Valid votes	1,219,145	96.75	
Invalid/blank votes	40,962	3.25	
Total votes	1,260,107	100.00	
Registered voters/turnout	3,727,843	33.80	
Source: Nohlen et al.

The overwhelming majority of the elected MPs, 101 out of 107, were male. The new parliament had 17 teachers/school inspectors, 12 executives, 12 professors, 12 engineers, 5 physicians, 5 jurists, 5 economists and 5 businessmen, whilst the remaining 34 MPs belonged to other professional categories.

== Aftermath ==
Following the elections, Youssouf Ouedraogo of ODP-MT became Prime Minister of the country. On June 20, 1992, a new seven-member cabinet was presented to the public.
