= Salif Diallo =

Burkinabé politician

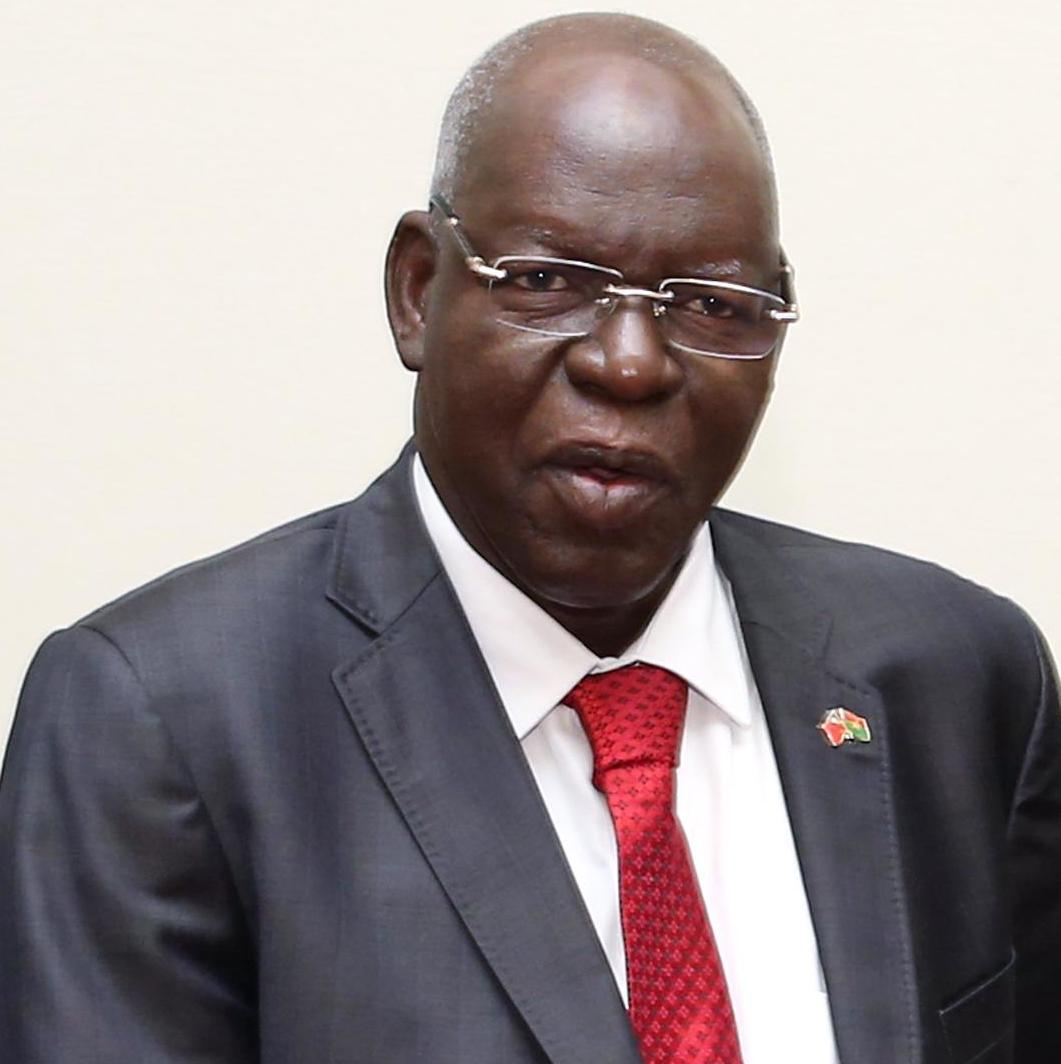

President of the National Assembly of Burkina Faso
- In office 30 December 2015 – 19 August 2017
- Preceded by: Chérif Sy
- Succeeded by: Alassane Bala Sakandé

Personal details
- Born: 9 May 1957
- Died: 19 August 2017 (age 60)
- Party: MPP

Salif Diallo (9 May 1957 – 19 August 2017) was a Burkinabé politician who was President of the National Assembly of Burkina Faso from 2015 to 2017. He was a key associate of President Blaise Compaoré from the 1980s to the 2000s, serving in various posts during that period, including as Director of the Cabinet of the President from 1987 to 1989, Minister of Environment and Water from 1995 to 1999, and Minister of Agriculture from 2000 to 2008. He was appointed as Burkina Faso's Ambassador to Austria later in 2008. He also served as Vice-President of the Congress for Democracy and Progress, the ruling party.

Diallo resigned from the CDP in January 2014 and participated in the founding of an opposition party, the People's Movement for Progress (MPP), becoming its First Vice-President. After the MPP's victory in the November 2015 general election, he was elected as President of the National Assembly on 30 December 2015.

== Life and career ==
Diallo, who was born in Ouahigouya, Yatenga Province, was expelled from the University of Ouagadougou for having organized strikes and protests. He then belonged to the Voltaic Revolutionary Communist Party and went on to Dakar, Senegal, to continue his Master of Law studies there. At the University of Dakar, he and other students formed a Committee for the Defence of the Revolution. In 1985 he returned to Burkina Faso and joined the dissident and pro-Sankara splinter-faction of the PCRV, the Burkinabé Communist Group.

Diallo became Assistant to the Cabinet of the Minister of State for Justice in 1986. Diallo was active in the Committees for the Defence of the Revolution. From 1987 to 1989 he was the Director of the Cabinet of the President, and from 1989 to 1991 he was Secretary of State to the Presidency. In 1991 he briefly served as Minister of Employment, Labour and Social Security. From 1992 to 1995 Diallo was Minister for the Missions of the Presidency. Subsequently he was Minister of Environment and Water from 1995 to 1999, then Adviser to the Presidency from 1999 to 2000. On 12 November 2000, he was appointed as Minister of Agriculture, and on 10 June 2002 his portfolio was expanded when he was appointed as Minister of Agriculture, Water, and Fishing Resources. He was elected as Vice-President of the CDP at the party's Second Ordinary Congress on 1–3 August 2003.

Diallo was dismissed from the national government on 23 March 2008. A few months after being dismissed from the government, Diallo was appointed as Ambassador to Austria. He presented his credentials to Austrian President Heinz Fischer on 8 January 2009. In addition to serving as Ambassador to Austria (based at the Burkinabé embassy in Vienna), Diallo was given additional accreditation for Croatia, Hungary, the Czech Republic, Slovakia, and Slovenia, as well as various international organizations: the International Energy Agency, the United Nations Office at Vienna, the United Nations Industrial Development Organization (UNIDO), and the Preparatory Commission for the Comprehensive Nuclear Test Ban Treaty Organization.

Diallo, along with a number of other prominent figures in the CDP, announced his resignation from the party on 6 January 2014. Those who resigned said that the party was being run in an undemocratic and damaging manner, and they expressed opposition to plans to amend the constitution to eliminate term limits, which would allow President Blaise Compaoré to stand for re-election in 2015. A new opposition party led by the prominent CDP members who resigned, the People's Movement for Progress (MPP), was founded on 25 January 2014. Roch Marc Christian Kaboré was designated as President of the MPP and Salif Diallo was designated as its First Vice-President.

Kaboré, standing as the MPP candidate, was elected as President of Burkina Faso in the November 2015 general election, while Diallo was elected to the National Assembly as a candidate on the MPP's national list. Kaboré was sworn in as President of Burkina Faso on 29 December 2015, and the National Assembly elected Diallo as its President on 30 December. He received the votes of 78 deputies, while 43 voted for Adama Sossou, a deputy from the Union for Progress and Reform.

Diallo received medical treatment in Tunis and then went to Paris, where he died on the night of 18–19 August 2017 at the age of 60.
