= Coat of arms and flag of Bern =

The coat of arms of Bern.

The flag of Bern.

The coat of arms of Bern, along with the associated flag and heraldic colours, are used both by the Swiss city of Bern and by the canton of the same name. They were also used by the former district of Bern until its abolition in 2009.

The coat of arms of Bern is on a red field, with a yellow diagonal band charged with a black bear with a red tongue, claws and penis, walking upwards toward the hoist. The heraldic blazon reads: Gules, on a bend or, a bear passant sable, langued, armed and vilené of the field. The flag of Bern is square and depicts the coat of arms. The heraldic colours of Bern are red and black.

== Heraldic beast ==
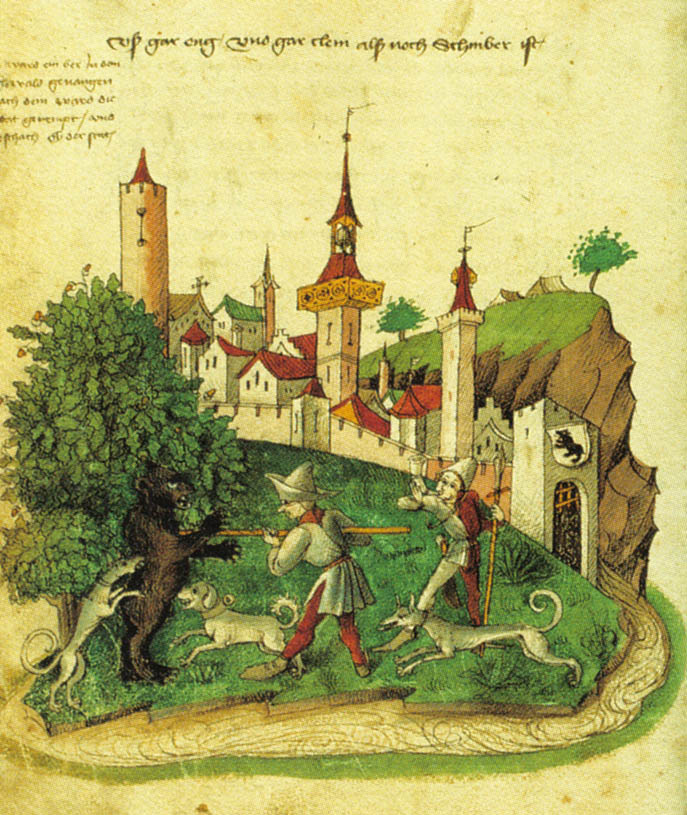
The hunt for the bear as depicted in the Tschachtlan chronicles. Note the original coat of arms above the gate.

The heraldic beast of Bern is the bear. It has long served as namesake, emblem, mascot and, at times, personification of Bern. The founding legend has it that Duke Berthold V of Zähringen vowed to choose as namesake the first animal his hunt met in the wood that was to be chopped down for the new city. Then, as Konrad Justinger's chronicle puts it:

Nu wart des ersten ein ber gevangen, darumb wart die stat bern genempt; und gab do den burgeren in der stat ein wappen und schilt, nemlich einen swarzen bern in einem wissen schilt in gender wise.
Then they caught a bear first, which is why the city was called Bern; and so the citizens had their coat and shield, which was a black bear in a white shield, going upright.

The bear motif is in evidence as early as 1224 (on city seals), and has remained in use ever since. Today the city of Bern still has bears featured directly outside its Altstadt in the Bärengraben.

== Coat of arms and flag ==
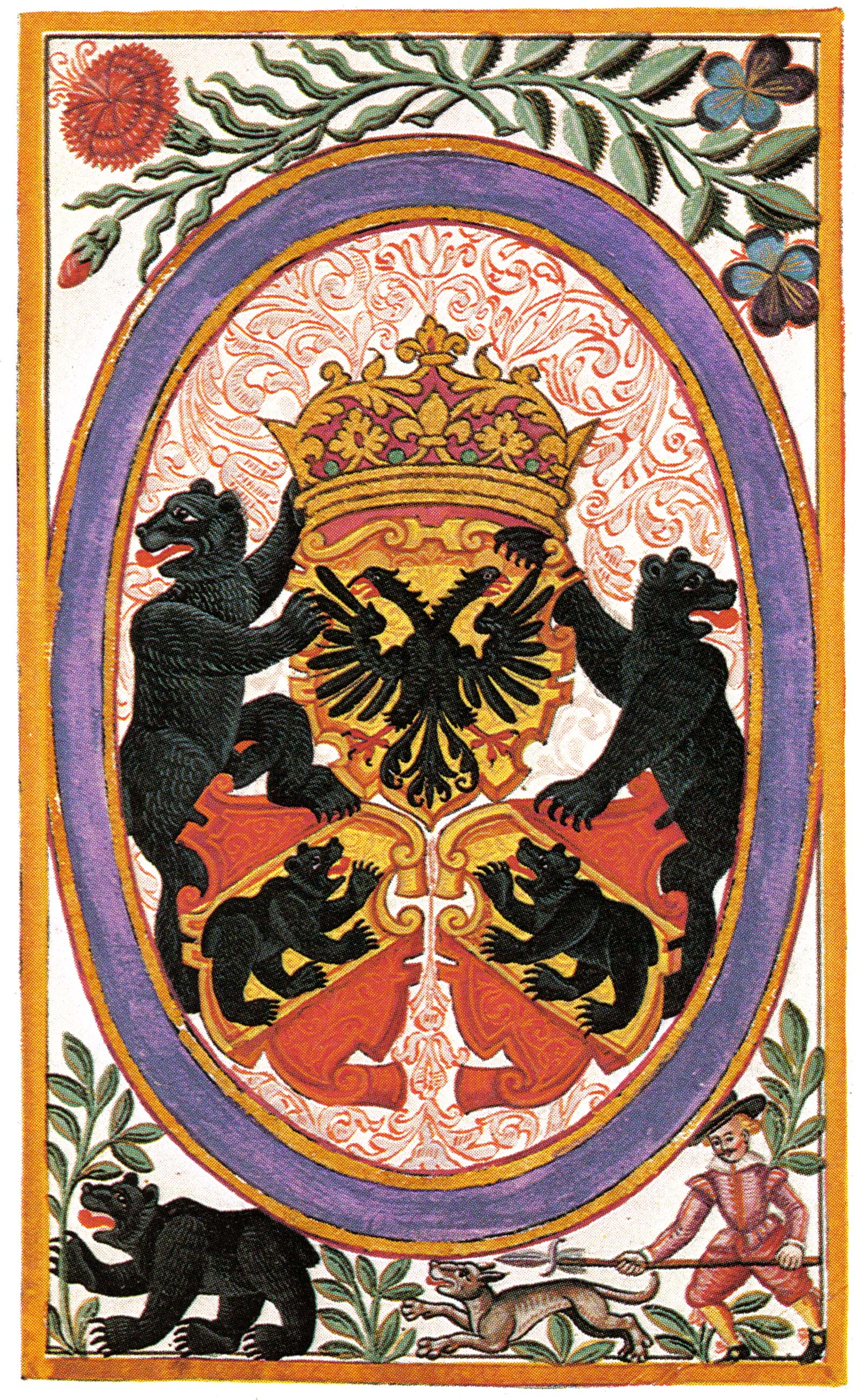
The Bern-Rych coat of arms from the Berner Chronik of Michael Stettler, 1620.

As Justinger's chronicle reveals, Bern's original coat of arms and flag was an upright black bear on a white shield (which is, incidentally, the coat of arms and flag of Berlin). In the 13th century, the coat of arms changed to the one in use today. The modern coat of arms is already recognisable in Alsatian mercenary songs of 1375 reported by Justinger. The change, according to the chroniclers, was linked to the Battle of Schosshalde in 1289 against the troops of Duke Rudolf II of Austria, son of Emperor Rudolf II von Habsburg. According to Justinger, a Bernese salvaged a part of the ensign as the fortunes of war turned against Bern, and Tschudi recounts:

Und als die von Bern bis ze der zit in ir paner den bern in wijssem veld gefuert, wars damals verendert in ein rot veld, von wegen das die paner ... von bluot was rot worden.
Until then, those of Bern carried the bear in a white field, but the field turned red that day, as the banner was drenched in blood.

The chronicler Stumpf then adds that the diagonal band changed from silver to gold to celebrate the eventual Bernese victory over the House of Habsburg.

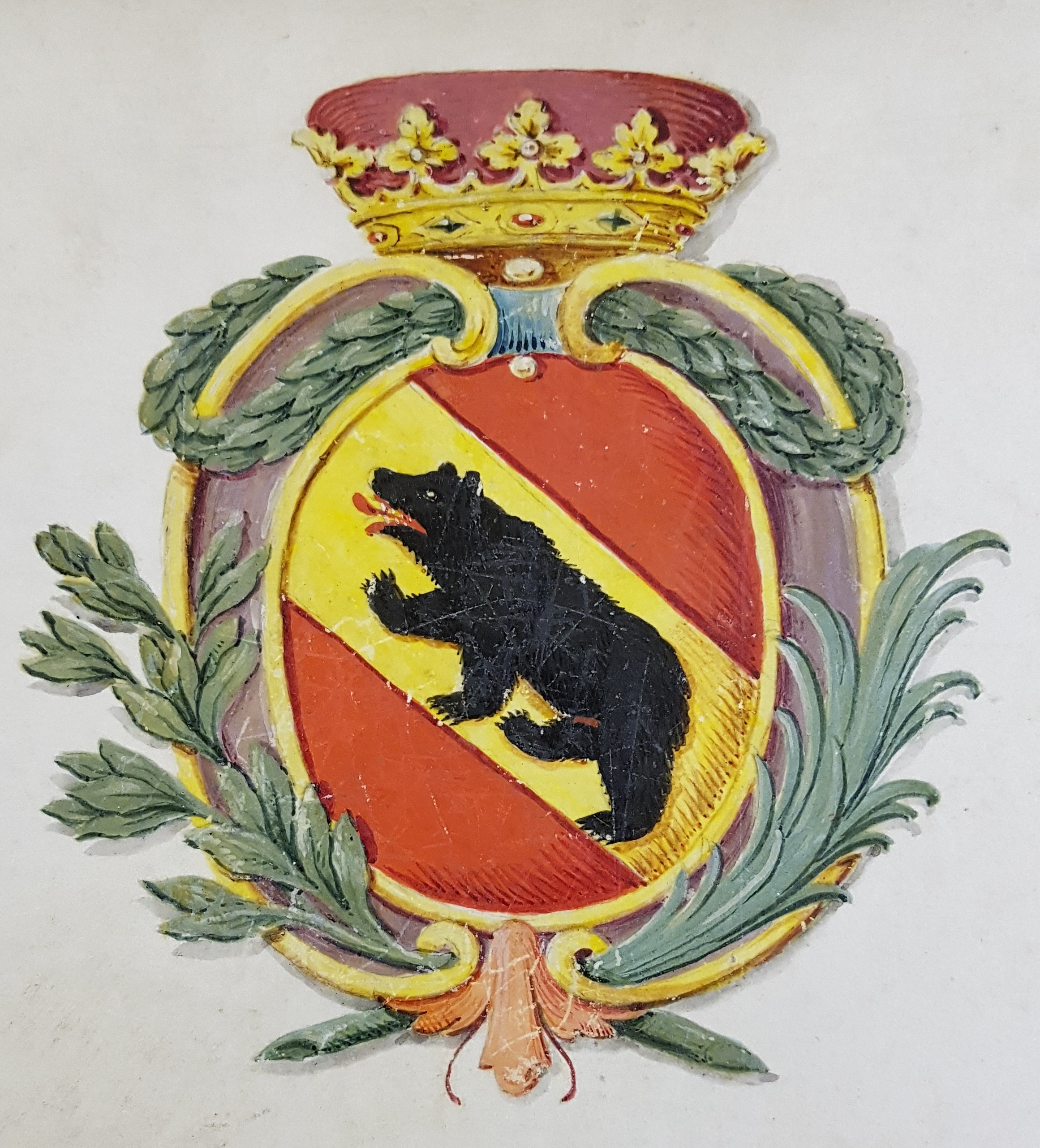
The coat of arms of the State and Republic of Bern, around 1790.

As long as Bern still considered itself (at least formally) to be part of the Holy Roman Empire, subject to the Emperor, this was reflected in its coat of arms. The imperial eagle was placed above the Bernese shield, constituting a compound coat of arms known as the Bern-Rych, or "Berne-Empire". Eventually, Bern formally gained the full sovereignty it had long since de facto possessed with the Peace of Westphalia in 1648, but it was not until 1700 that the eagle was replaced with the Republic's trefoil crown that signified ultimate temporal power. This crown is still used by the canton, which places it on top of the coat of arms on its official documents. The city of Bern uses a mural crown on top of its coat of arms, while the district uses no crown.

== Other flags of Bern ==
The military flag of the Ancien Régime, depicting a white cross on black and red flammé, is sometimes flown in lieu of or alongside the state flag.

In vertical flags, the state colours red and black are sometimes used. Yellow is not counted among the state colours.

It also exists an alternative bear design used independently in the City of Berne or throughout the Canton.

Military Flag of the Ancien Régime

State colours, sometimes used as a vertical flag

Alternative design

== Adaptations ==
A flag for the Bernese Oberland, designed by B. v. Rodt, was accepted as official by the Bernese Executive Council in 1953. It consists of a black eagle in a gold field (in reference to the region's old status as reichsfrei) over two fields in the cantonal colours of red and black. As opposed to most other Swiss flags, which are quadratic, the flag's format is specified as "an upright oblong in the proportions of 23 to 26".

The city of New Bern, North Carolina uses almost the same flag as that of Bern, except that its bear does not have a red penis.

Flag of the Bernese Oberland

Flag of the City of New Bern, North Carolina, which is almost identical

== See also ==
- History of Bern
- Coat of arms and flag of Berlin: Berlin, Bern's sister capital (of Germany), has a remarkably similar heraldic and vexillological history.
