= Revolutionary Military Organization =

Burkinabé military faction

The Revolutionary Military Organization (French: Organisation Militaire Révolutionnaire, abbreviated OMR) was a political faction within the Burkina Faso Armed Forces. OMR was led by Captain Thomas Sankara. The group emerged from a movement of young, radical military officers during the 1970s. The group played an influential role in the military regime that took power in 1982, and was one of the main forces in the revolution of August 4, 1983. OMR continued to function as one of the factions within the government between 1983 and 1987.

== ROC ==
OMR had its roots in an informal grouping of young progressive military officers named ROC. The group emerged in the mid-1970s, in a context where there was rampant corruption of high-level military officials through the diversion of aid efforts. The young progressive officers Sankara and Jean-Baptiste Boukary Lingani authored anonymous tracts using names as Le Roc and Arête. Their grouping eventually took the name 'ROC'. It has largely been attributed that ROC was short for Rassemblement des officiers communistes ('Communist Officers Grouping'), but this hypothesis has been rejected by ex-ROC members who argue that the name was just the French word for 'rock'. The early members of ROC were Sankara, Boukary Lingani, Henri Zongo, Abdoul Salam Kaboré and Boukary Kaboré. Eventually Blaise Compaoré joined the group.

ROC sought economic development and cultural transformation of the country, national sovereignty, and rallying with other socialist and progressive countries for the sake of Third World liberation. ROC would meet in secret in private houses or at maquis (restaurant-bars) in Ouagadougou and Bobo-Dioulasso. During the 1981-1983 period the ROC military officers were linked to the African Independence Party (PAI) and the ex-Union of Communist Struggles (ULC) faction led by Valère Somé. There were also contacts with the Voltaic Revolutionary Communist Party (PCRV) via Watamou Lamien.

== CSP period ==
During exile of Sankara, Compaoré and Zongo, ROC elements - military officers such as Pierre Ouédraogo, Laurent Sedego and Jean-Claude Kamboulé - maintained the organizational network of the group active inside Upper Volta. Pierre Ouedraogo coordinated the preparations of the November 7, 1982 coup with the conservative officers. Through the November 7, 1982 coup the People's Salvation Council (CSP) military junta seized power. After some internal debate ROC joined CSP military junta government and voted for Jean-Baptiste Ouédraogo to become president at a meeting held November 13, 1982. At CSP meeting held November 22-26, 1982 Compaoré was inducted into the CSP whilst Boukary Lingani was elected speaker of the new National Assembly, with fellow ROC member Kilimité Hein as deputy speaker.

During the period of CSP military junta, there were tensions within the new regime between radicals supported by Libya and Ghana and conservatives supported by France and Ivory Coast. ROC met at the house of Zongo on December 21, 1982, which was the first formal meeting of the group. Attendees at the meeting included Sankara, Compaoré, Boukary Lingani, Zongo, Pierre Ouedraogo and Jean-Claude Kamboulé. According to a later testimony of Compaoré, the meeting decided to formally constitute the OMR. The OMR wanted to create post of Prime Minister, in order to install Sankara in this post to steer the process towards transition to civilian rule. Furthermore OMR wanted to include PAI and the ex-ULC group of Valère Somé in the cabinet. In January 1983 the OMR presented its demands at meeting of the CSP military junta. Albeit the OMR proposals were resisted by the conservatives members of the CSP, it managed to push Jean-Baptiste Ouédraogo to accept Sankara as the Prime Minister and inducted 2 PAI and 1 ex-ULC government ministers. Per Bruno Jaffré OMR probably had a majority of members within the CSP junta, at the time before the arrest of Sankara in May 1983.

== August 4, 1983 revolution ==
After the overthrow of Jean-Baptiste Ouédraogo in August 1983, there were divisions within OMR on the political course to take. Compaoré argued that he himself should become president, as he had been the main leader of the uprising - commanding the troops garrisoned at Pô and freeing Sankara from house arrest. But the faction led by Ernest Nongma Ouédraogo, Minister of Security in the new government, insisted on Sankara as the new president. The Ouédraogo-led faction opposed Compaoré's bid for the presidency citing the fierce opposition towards the latter from the other forces that had carried out the revolution - the PAI and the ex-ULC elements. During the early period of the new regime some twenty military officers took part in the National Revolutionary Council (CNR) meetings, all belonging to the OMR. In the 21-member government that took office on August 25, 1983 there were 5 of the young officers - Captain Sankara, Captain Compaoré, Captain Zongo, Major Boukary Lingani and Commander Abdoul Salam Kaboré.

OMR re-surged as a formal organization around Sankara and other military officers during negotiations for the CNR to reconcile with PAI in April 1985. Per Sennen Andriamirado Sankara mobilized OMR to counter the influence of Union of Communist Struggles – Reconstructed (ULC-R) within the government. Commander Abdoul Salam Kaboré was the spokesperson of OMR. In May 1986, as discussions took place on a possible unification of Burkinabé Communist Group (GCB), the Union of Burkinabè Communists (UCB) and ULC-R, OMR was mentioned as the fourth political force in the process. After tensions in the CNR in August 1986, Sankara relaunched the then dormant OMR.

== Formalization of OMR and overthrow of Sankara ==
Sankara called an urgent OMR meeting to be held on September 3, 1987, to discuss the issue of the circulation of defamatory anonymous tracts against Sankara and his family members. At the meeting Compaoré and his associates were accused of spreading the tracts. In response Compaoré declared the OMR to be an incompetent military grouping in regards to the mobilization, organization and education of the people. During this period OMR, which was operating as an informal faction, began drafting formal statues for the group. The preamble of the draft statues stated that OMR was committed to the "union of the Burkinabé left-wing towards the creation of a Marxist–Leninist party".

During the evening of October 14, 1987 Sankara called UCB leaders to attend an urgent meeting. At meeting Sankara presented new statues for OMR which framed it as "political-military organization which participates in the exercise of state power within the National Revolutionary Council". Sankara declared that OMR could not be members of any other political organization, and as such military officer must withdraw from the UCB. This message did not go down well with the UCB. Sankara was overthrown and executed the following day.
