= Ablassé Ouedraogo =

Burkinabé politician

Ablassé Ouédrago

Member of the National Assembly of Burkina Faso
- In office December 2012 – November 2020

Deputy Director-General of the World Trade Organization
- In office 1999–2002

Minister of Foreign Affairs
- In office March 1994 – February 1999

Personal details
- Born: 30 June 1953 (age 71); Dabaré, Burkina Faso
- Political party: Alternative Faso (since 2011); Congress for Democracy and Progress (before 2011)
- Children: 2
- Education: National University of Gabon, University of Nice

Ablassé Ouédraogo (born 30 June 1953 in Dabaré) is a Burkinabé economist, diplomat and politician. Ouédraogo served as Minister of Foreign Affairs for Burkina Faso between 1994 and 1999. He is the founder of the Alternative Faso party and has served as its president since 2012, and was elected president of the National Union for Democracy and Development on 8 September 2018.

== Early years and education ==
Ouédraogo was born in Dabaré, Pabré Department, in Burkina Faso's province of Kadiogo on 30 June 1953. Born to a farmer, he was raised in a Muslim Mossi family in Moaga. He attended Cercle de Boussé for primary school then Lycée Philippe Zinda Kaboré in Ouagadougou, where he earned a Baccalauréat in Economics and Social Sciences. He studied economics at the National University of Gabon on a scholarship from the Association of African Universities from 1973 to 1975 and received a diploma in general economics. He then pursued his doctorate in development economics at the University of Nice in France and successfully defended his dissertation, "Multinational firms and the industrialization of developing countries," on 15 December 1981 with high honors. After returning to Burkina Faso in January, he spent 7 months teaching in the University of Ouagadougou's School of Economics.

== Political career ==
Ouédraogo's political career began on an international level with roles within the United Nations Development Programme, starting as Deputy Administrator for the United Nations Industrial Development Organization in Niamey, Niger from 1982 to 1984. He was then Head of Programme in Conakry, Guinea, from 1984 to 1986; Deputy Resident Representative to the Organization of African Unity (OAU) and the Economic Commission for Africa (ECA) in Addis Ababa (1986-1988) and in Kinshasa, Zaire; and Resident Representative in Brazzaville (1988-1991). He also worked as Regional Director for East Africa of the UN office for the Sudan-Sahel Region in Nairobi. In his last role with the UN, he supported the Intergovernmental Authority on Development, Southern African Development Coordination Conference, and the United Nations Environment Programme in addition to the OAU and ECA (1993-1994).

Ouédraogo's political career in Burkina Faso began with his appointment as Minister of Foreign Affairs in March 1994, a role he held until February 1999, when he served as Special Advisor to the President for nine months. As a minister, he focused on developing a strategic reorientation of the country's foreign policy through the development and implementation of the concept of "development diplomacy," which channeled a greater number of resources towards development and economic stimulation. This, paired with Burkina Faso's growing reputation as a safe haven, influenced the decision to hold the OAU Summit of Heads of State and Government there in 1998. The country held a year-long presidential term in 1998-1999. The 1998 Africa Cup of Nations was also held there. In late 1998, he was Head of the Delegation of Burkina Faso at the Meeting of Ministers of Foreign Affairs, a Member of the Presidential Delegation at the 20th and 21st Summits of Heads of State of France and Africa, and a Burkina Faso representative at the OECD Forum.

In 1999, he became the first African and first representative from a Least Developed Country to serve as Deputy Director-General of the World Trade Organization (WTO). His work with WTO was focused on a partnership with and development in Africa, including the launch of the African Ministers of Trade conference in Libreville. He presented at the WTO Ministerial Conferences in Seattle in November 1999 and Doha in November 2001, and at the International Conference on Financing for Development held at Monterrey in March 2002.

=== Diplomacy ===
His career work has been characterized by diplomatic and development efforts throughout Africa, including contributions to the resolution of the Tuareg rebellion in Niger and Mali and negotiations leading up to Namibian independence. Between December 2003 and July 2007, Ouédraogo worked as Senior Advisor for Africa to the President of the African Development Bank Group (ADB) and represented the company among the peace negotiators in Darfur, assuming the role of President of the Wealth Sharing Commission. The negotiations resulted in the signing of the Darfur Peace Agreement on 5 May 2006. He served as Special Advisor to the President of the Commission of the Economic Community of West African States (ECOWAS) for trade negotiations from August 2007 to June 2008, wherein he contributed to negotiations on the Economic Partnership Agreements and advocated on behalf of cotton-producing countries during multilateral negotiations at the WTO.

Between 2008 and 2009, Ouédrago participated in several interventions on behalf of the President of the African Union Commission in the negotiations between Chad and Sudan, which helped renew social and diplomatic relations between the two countries. From February to December 2009, Ouédrago was mediator and Special Envoy of the President of the African Union Commission to Madagascar. This political crisis eventually subsided with the signing of the Additional Act of Addis Ababa to the Malagasy Charter of the Transition on 6 November 2009.

Ouédraogo served as national coordinator of the political opposition protests in Ouagadougou in October 2014, when Compaoré was deposed. He was part of the team that worked to establish a transitional government, which included working to convince the military to approve a civilian transitional leader. An interim president, Michel Kafando, was chosen within 15 days. Ouédraogo was also involved with restoring peace following the failed coup d’état deposing Kafando on 17 September 2015.

=== Political opposition ===
Ouédraogo founded the liberal centrist political party Alternative Faso in 2011 after observing conservative elements of Blaise Compaoré's presidency he found at odds with his own ideology. He became the party's president in 2012 and was elected to the National Assembly of Burkina Faso's Fifth Legislature of the Fourth Republic in December 2012 as a representative of Alternative Faso. He played a significant role in combating the modification to Article 37 of the Burkinabé Constitution governing presidential term limits.

Alternative Faso selected Ouédraogo as their candidate in the 2015 Burkinabè general election but he garnered only 1.93% of all the votes, losing to Roch Marc Christian Kaboré. He ran again in 2020 but gained only 1.81% of the vote.

On 25 December 2023, Ablassé Ouedraogo was apprehended by the police at his home. Ablassé Ouedraogo would have received a military requisition order sent by the Burkinabé transitional power forcing Ablassé Ouedraogo to go to the front against terrorism..

== Other interests ==
In addition to his work on international matters, Ouédraogo also serves as a consultant for road safety and the recreation industry. He founded ZOODO International, an international and strategic relations consulting firm, in 2008. He has championed increased resource distribution to and self-determination for rural populations. Additionally, he promotes women's empowerment. He served on the Administrative Council of the International Center for Tropical Agriculture from July 2007 to August 2008, where he helped promote agricultural research in Africa. From September 2010 to June 2013, he served as President of the Administrative Council for the New Inter-University Third Cycle in Economics for universities in Central and West Africa. He has also advocated for increased access to public and religious schools for rural communities, prioritizing youth access to culture. He organized a Music Summit in September 2011 to promote the musical arts.

== Awards and honors ==
- December 2015 - Commandeur of the National Order of Burkina Faso
- November 2000 - Officer of the National Equatorial Order of Gabon
- December 1997 - Officer of the National Order of Burkina Faso
