= Rally for the Development of Burkina =

The Rally for the Development of Burkina (French: Rassemblement pour le Développement du Burkina, RDB) was a political party in Burkina Faso led by Celestin Saidou Compaoré.

== History ==
In April 2005 it joined the Convention of Democratic Forces together with the Convention for Democracy and Federation and the Greens of Burkina. In the 2007 parliamentary elections it won 2 of the 111 seats in the National Assembly. It was reduced to one seat in the 2012 elections.
