= LaFlamme =

LaFlamme, La Flamme, or Laflamme may refer to:

== People ==
LaFlamme, La Flamme, or Laflamme is a surname. Notable people with this surname include:

- Anne La Flamme, New Zealander immunologist
- Christian Laflamme (born 1976), Canadian professional ice hockey defenceman
- David LaFlamme (born 1941), American virtuoso violinist
- Joseph-Clovis-Kemner Laflamme (1849–1910), Canadian Roman Catholic priest, academic and writer
- Larry Laflamme, American politician
- Léo Kemner Laflamme (1893–1989), Canadian politician
- Lisa LaFlamme (born 1964), Canadian television journalist
- Napoléon Kemner Laflamme (1865–1929), Canadian lawyer and politician
- Ovide Laflamme (1925–1993), Canadian lawyer, judge and politician
- Paul LaFlamme, New Hampshire state representative
- Raymond Laflamme (1960–2025), Canadian physicist
- Rodolphe Laflamme (1827–1893), French-Canadian lawyer, professor of law and politician

== Toponyms ==
- Réserve écologique J.-Clovis-Laflamme, in Saguenay–Lac-Saint-Jean, in Quebec, Canada
- Laflamme River, a tributary of Bell River, in Nord-du-Québec, Québec, Canada

== Others ==
- La flamme, 1926 French silent drama film
- Aurelie Laflamme's Diary (Le Journal d'Aurélie Laflamme), a series of novellas by India Desjardins and a 2010 film adaptation
- Union of Communist Struggles – The Flame (French: Union des Luttes Communistes – La Flamme), a Burkina Faso political party (also party organ La Flamme)

== See also ==
- Jeanne la Flamme or Joan of Arc, patron saint of France
- Flamme (disambiguation)
- La Flame
