= Republican Front =

Republican Front may refer to:

- Republican Front (Burkina Faso)
- Republican Front (Catalonia)
- Republican Front (French Fourth Republic), the coalition which won the 1956 French legislative election
- Republican Front (French Fifth Republic), a term referring to the rallying of parties across the political spectrum against the National Front, later the National Rally
- Republican Front (Zimbabwe)
- Republican Front of Guatemala
- United Democratic Republican Front
