= Convention for Democracy and Liberty =

Political party in Burkina Faso

The Convention for Democracy and Liberty (French: Convention pour la Démocratie et la Liberté, CDL) was a political party in Burkina Faso.

== History ==
Prior to the 2007 parliamentary elections the party joined the Convention of Democratic Forces alliance, alongside the Convention for Democracy and Federation, the Greens of Burkina and the Rally for Independent Forces/Party of the Youth of Burkina. The alliance won three seats.

The party ran alone in the 2012 parliamentary elections, receiving just 0.04% of the vote and failing to win a seat. In 2014 it joined the pro-government Republican Front.

On 29 January 2026, all parties, including this one, were dissolved through decree by the junta government in Burkina Faso.
