= G14 =

G14 or G-14 may refer to:

== Vehicles ==
=== Aircraft ===
- Chase YCG-14, an American assault glider
- Messerschmitt Bf 109G-14, a German fighter aircraft

=== Surface vehicles ===
- BMW 8 Series (G14), an automobile
- GER Class G14, a British 2-4-0 steam locomotive class
- LSWR G14 class, a British 4-6-0 steam locomotive class

=== Ships ===
- ARM Ignacio L. Vallarta (G14), an Auk-class minesweeper of the Mexican Navy
- HMS G14, a G-class submarine of the Royal Navy
- HMS Milne (G14), an M-class destroyer of the Royal Navy

== Other uses ==
- G-14, a former organisation of European football clubs
- G14 (nations), a proposed plan that will put 6 emerging economies in the G8+5 group
- Gang of 14
- County Route G14 (California)
- February 14th Group, a political alliance in Burkina Faso
