= National Convention of Progressive Patriots–Social Democratic Party =

The National Convention of Progressive Patriots–Social Democratic Party (French: Convention Nationale des Patriotes Progressistes/Parti Social-Démocrate, CNPP/PSD) was a political party in Burkina Faso led by Pierre Tapsoba.

== History ==
The party was expelled from the Popular Front in March 1991, after criticising policies of the ruling Organization for Popular Democracy – Labour Movement (ODP-MT). It finished second in the parliamentary elections the following year, receiving 12% of the vote and winning 12 of the 107 seats in the National Assembly.

In May 1993 the party suffered a breakaway when six of its MPs left to join the new Party for Democracy and Progress.

In 1996 it merged into the new Congress for Democracy and Progress alongside the ODP-MT.
