= 1991 Burkinabé presidential election =

Election of Blaise Compaoré

Presidential elections were held in Burkina Faso on 1 December 1991. They were the first elections in the country since 1978, but were boycotted by the opposition parties.

The result was a victory for the only candidate, incumbent President Blaise Compaoré, although voter turnout was just 27.3%. Turnout was highest in Oubritenga (Bassitenga) Province, at 83.8%; Compaoré's hometown of Ziniaré is located in this province. Turnout was lowest in Kouritenga Province, with only 9.3% of eligible voters voting.

== Background ==
The previous Burkinabe elections had been held in 1978. Multiple coups (in 1980, 1982, 1983, and 1987) occurred in the intervening years.

Blaise Compaoré came to power in the 1987 coup, which included the assassination of the sitting President, Thomas Sankara. Opposition parties were outlawed until 1989.

In June 1991, a new constitution was approved in a referendum. It introduced the ability of opposition parties to organize, but they were not allowed to challenge Compaoré's rule. Between the June referendum and December election, the coalition between Compaoré's ruling party (Organization for Popular Democracy – Labour Movement) and the opposition parties (Coordination des Forces Démocratique) fractured.

Compaoré agreed to hold a presidential election after a series of strikes demanding democracy in the country. Although Compaoré agreed to hold the elections, opposition groups boycotted the election because he had failed to follow through on a promise to transfer power to a transitional government instead of retaining power himself.

== Results ==
Candidate	Party	Votes	%
Blaise Compaoré	Organization for Popular Democracy – Labour Movement	750,146	100.00
Total		750,146	100.00
Valid votes		750,146	86.42
Invalid/blank votes		117,892	13.58
Total votes		868,038	100.00
Registered voters/turnout		3,179,053	27.30

== Aftermath ==
The next presidential election would be held in 1998. By that point, opposition parties were permitted to run against Compaoré, although they boycotted that election as well. Compaoré remained as president until 2014, when a popular uprising led him to resign.
