= Dabare =

Dabare may refer to:

== People ==
- Thanuka Dabare (born 1998), Sri Lankan cricketer
- Udula Dabare (1936–2023), Sri Lankan actress

== Other uses ==
- Dabaré, town in town
