= Coalition of Democratic Forces =

Coalition of Democratic Forces may refer to:

- Coalition of Democratic Forces (Burkina Faso)
- Coalition of Democratic Forces (Kazakhstan)
- Coalition of Democratic Forces (Rwanda)
