= Democratic Forces for Progress =

- Leader: Issa Dominique Konate
- Founded: 1990s
- Dissolved: 1990s
- Ideology: Marxism; Socialism; Communism; Social democracy
- Political position: Center-left to far-left

The Democratic Forces for Progress (French: Forces Démocratiques pour le Progrès) or FDP was a political alliance in Burkina Faso led by Issa Dominique Konate.

It existed in the early 1990s and consisted of the following political parties:

- Movement for Socialist Democracy
- African Independence Party
- Movement of Progressive Democrats
- Burkinabè Socialist Party
- Union of Social Democrats
