= OCV =

OCV may refer to

- On-chip variation
- Open-circuit voltage
- Voltaic Communist Organization (French: Organisation communiste voltaïque)
- Offshore Combatant Vessel, a proposed multi-role ship class to be built by the Royal Australian Navy
- Optical Character Verification (automated verification/inspection of printed text using Machine vision)
- Offshore Construction Vessel
