= Movement of Progressive Democrats =

Political party in Burkina Faso

The Movement of Progressive Democrats (French: Mouvement des Démocrates Progressistes, MDP) was a political party in Burkina Faso.

== History ==
The MDP was established on 15 October 1987 by Hermann Yaméogo. It joined the Popular Front, but was suspended from the group in July 1990 following internal problems. In December 1990 Yaméogo broke away from the party to establish the Alliance for Democracy and Federation.

The party won a single seat in the 1992 parliamentary elections. In 1996 it merged into the new Congress for Democracy and Progress.
