= National Convention for the Progress of Burkina =

Former political party in Burkina Faso

The National Convention for the Progress of Burkina (French: Convention Nationale pour le Progrès du Burkina, CNPB) was a political party in Burkina Faso led by Jourouboundou René Lompo.

== History ==
The party received 0.5% of the vote in the 2012 parliamentary elections, winning a single seat in the National Assembly.
