= Flammé (yarn) =

See flammé (vexillology) for the flag design.

Flammé yarns are a kind of novelty yarn. It is generally a loose or untwisted core wrapped by at least one other strand. The extra element can be a metallic thread, or a much-thicker or much-narrower strand of yarn, or yarn that varies between thick and thin. In a fabric with a tight weave or knit, the irregular thickness of flammé yarn can create slubs, as in some silks or tweeds. Some companies have come to put twin yarns on the market to show off combinations of one regular yarn and novelty yarns in assorted colors or even two different types of novelty yarns.

== See also ==
- Bouclé
