= Republican Front (Burkina Faso) =

The Republican Front (French: Front républicain) was a coalition of political parties in Burkina Faso. The coalition was launched on January 23, 2014, at a conference held at Hotel Splendid in the capital Ouagadougou. Some forty political parties took part in the foundation of the coalition. The coalition emerged in response to popular protests against reform of Article 37. The coalition supported holding a referendum on Article 37 of the Constitution, which would have enabled the president Blaise Compaoré took be re-elected. Amongst the leaders present at the founding of the Republican Front were Assimi Kouanda (National Executive Secretary, Congress for Democracy and Progress), Alain Zoubga (l'Autre Burkina), Ram Ouédraogo (Rally of the Ecologists of Burkina), Hermann Yaméogo (National Union for Democracy and Development), Maxime Kaboré (Independent Party of Burkina), Toussaint Abel Coulibaly (Union for the Republic) and Diemdoda Dicko (CFD).

In February 2014, a list of member parties of the Front was released, with 25 parties from the presidential majority and 12 parties from the opposition.

At a meeting held in April 2014, twelve parties announced their entry into the Republican Front; Congress of African Nations/Burkina Faso (Paulin Sanfo), Republican Democratic Front (Landry Charlemagne Kaboré), Movement for Democracy and Freedoms (Mahama Kouka Sawadogo), Patriotic Front for Change (Tahirou Zon), Republican and Democratic Front (Abou Nikièma), Union of Centrist Forces (Issa Balima), Justice and Development Party (Dieudonné Bakouan), Force for the Defense of Democracy (Edouard Ouédraogo), Rally of Democrats for Faso (Salvador Yaméogo), Party of Progressive Patriots (David Cyrill Kondé), Union for Development and Democracy (Toubé Clément Dakio) and Alliance for Democracy in Faso (Boureima Ouédraogo).

On April 12, 2014, the Republican Front organized a mass meeting at the Wobi stadium, Bobo Dioulasso. Chantal Compaoré, the first lady of the Republic, addressed the meeting.

On October 8, 2014, the Republican Front announced the entry of three new political parties into the front; the National Renewal Party, the Union of Democratic Forces of Burkina and the Union for the People's Movement.
