= Rally for Democracy and Socialism =

Political party in Burkina Faso

The Rally for Democracy and Socialism (French: Rassemblement pour la Démocratie et le Socialism, RDS) is a political party in Burkina Faso led by Salfo Théodore Ouédraogo.

== History ==
The party was established on 20 June 2009. It received 0.8% of the vote in the 2012 parliamentary elections, winning a single seat in the National Assembly.

All political parties in Burkina Faso were dissolved through decree by the junta on 29 January 2026.
