= Independent Party of Burkina =

Political party

The Independent Party of Burkina (French: Parti indépendant du Burkina, PIB) was a political party in Burkina Faso. In 2014 Maxime Kaboré was the chairman of the party.

== History ==
The party failed to win any seats in the 2012 parliamentary elections, in which its national list received 0.25% of the vote.

The party held its first congress in Ouagadougou on 7 and 8 June 2014. It subsequently joined the Republican Front alliance.
