= Frédéric Guirma =

Burkinabé politician and diplomat (1931–2024)

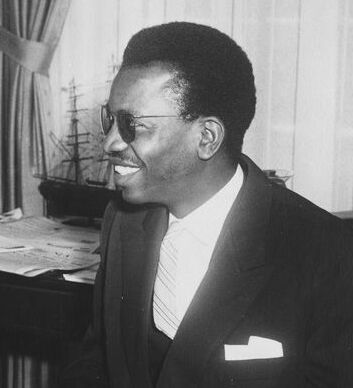
Guirma in 1961

Frédéric Fernand Guirma (27 April 1931 – 9 January 2024) was a Burkinabé diplomat, writer and politician. In 1959 he became the president of the trade union centre CATC. From 1960 to 1963 he was the Republic of Upper Volta's first Ambassador to the United States and his country's Permanent Representative to the United Nations. He headed the conservative political party Front de Refus or RDA. He gained 5.87% of the vote in the 1998 presidential election. Guirma died on 9 January 2024, at the age of 92.

== Literary works ==
- Princess of the full moon (African folklore), 1969
- Tales of Mogho: African Stories from Upper Volta, 1971
