= Yeelen (Burkinabé monthly) =

Yeelen ('Light' in Dyula language) was a publication issued from Ouagadougou, Burkina Faso. Yeelen was the monthly organ of the ruling Organization for Popular Democracy – Labour Movement (ODP/MT). The first issue was published on May 1, 1989. It was published in tabloid format, with issues containing 8 pages. The circulation of Yeelen was some 3,000 copies per issue. Issues of Yeelen were sold for 100 Francs CFA.

Contents mainly dealt with national politics. Prosper Birba was the editor of Yeelen. F. Evariste Ouedraogo served as its commercial director.

As of the early 1990s, the publication of Yeelen had become irregular.
