= 1997 Burkinabé parliamentary election =

Parliamentary elections were held in Burkina Faso on 11 May 1997, after the National Assembly completed its first full term since independence. The result was a victory for the Congress for Democracy and Progress, which won 101 of the 111 seats in the National Assembly. Voter turnout was just 44.1%.

Following the election, the Supreme Court annulled the results in four constituencies. The election was re-run in those wards on 19 June, all of which were won by the CDP.

== Results ==
Party	Votes	%	Seats	+/–
Congress for Democracy and Progress	1,449,082	68.61	101	+8
Party for Democracy and Progress	213,620	10.11	6	New
African Democratic Rally	136,006	6.44	2	–4
Alliance for Democracy and Federation	156,325	7.40	2	–2
Burkinabé Socialist Party	38,005	1.80	0	–1
African Independence Party	31,381	1.49	0	–2
Burkinabé Socialist Bloc	27,493	1.30	0	0
Social Forces Front	16,597	0.79	0	New
Group of Patriotic Democrats	12,652	0.60	0	0
Party for Progress and Social Development	11,408	0.54	0	New
Union of Greens for the Development of Burkina	9,437	0.45	0	0
Movement for Tolerance and Progress	7,117	0.34	0	0
New Social Democracy	2,855	0.14	0	0
Total	2,111,978	100.00	111	+4
Valid votes	2,111,978	96.18		
Invalid/blank votes	83,887	3.82		
Total votes	2,195,865	100.00		
Registered voters/turnout	4,982,621	44.07		
Source: Nohlen et al.
