= 1991 Burkinabé constitutional referendum =

Referendum to approve a new consitution

- 9 June 1991

Results
Choice	Votes	%
Yes	1,504,653	92.83%
No	116,139	7.17%
Valid votes	1,620,792	97.62%
Invalid or blank votes	39,529	2.38%
Total votes	1,660,321	100.00%
Registered voters/turnout	1,660,321	100%

A constitutional referendum was held in Burkina Faso on 9 June 1991. It followed the 1987 military coup, and would restore multi-party democracy. The new constitution retained the presidential system of government, created a bicameral parliament, and limited the President to two seven-year terms. It was approved by 92.83% of voters with a 48.8% turnout.

== Results ==
Choice	Votes	%
For	1,504,653	92.83
Against	116,139	6.17
Invalid/blank votes	39,529	–
Total	1,660,321	100
Registered voters/turnout	3,403,451	48.78
Source: Direct Democracy
