= Union of Social Democrats (Burkina Faso) =

Political party in Burkina Faso

The Union of Social Democrats (French: Union des Socio-Démocrates, USD) was a political party in Burkina Faso.

== History ==
The USD was established in November 1990 by Alain Bédouma Yoda, and recognised on 4 April 1991.

The party won a single seat in the 1992 parliamentary elections. On 6 February 1996 it merged into the new Congress for Democracy and Progress.
