= Anne La Flamme =

New Zealand immunologist and academic

Anne Camille La Flamme
- Education: University of Washington
- Scientific career
- Fields: Immunology
- Thesis: Trypanosoma cruzi-infected macrophages are defective in class II antigen presentation (1997)

Anne Camille La Flamme is a New Zealand immunologist. She is currently a professor at the Malaghan Institute at Victoria University of Wellington in New Zealand.

== Biography ==
La Flamme earned her BSc at Massachusetts Institute of Technology (MIT), in Cambridge, Massachusetts.

She has a MSc thesis entitled 'Interleukin-2 production by transgenic Trypanosoma cruzi : molecular and biochemical characterization' and a PhD dissertation entitled 'Trypanosoma cruzi-infected macrophages are defective in class II antigen presentation,' both from the University of Washington in Seattle, Washington.

== Selected works ==
- Hesse, Matthias, Manuel Modolell, Anne C. La Flamme, Marco Schito, José Manuel Fuentes, Allen W. Cheever, Edward J. Pearce, and Thomas A. Wynn. "Differential regulation of nitric oxide synthase-2 and arginase-1 by type 1/type 2 cytokines in vivo: granulomatous pathology is shaped by the pattern of L-arginine metabolism." The Journal of Immunology 167, no. 11 (2001): 6533–6544.
- Buckner, Frederick S., C. L. Verlinde, Anne C. La Flamme, and Wesley C. Van Voorhis. "Efficient technique for screening drugs for activity against Trypanosoma cruzi using parasites expressing beta-galactosidase." Antimicrobial Agents and Chemotherapy 40, no. 11 (1996): 2592–2597.
- La Flamme, Anne Camille, Kate Ruddenklau, and B. Thomas Bäckström. "Schistosomiasis decreases central nervous system inflammation and alters the progression of experimental autoimmune encephalomyelitis." Infection and Immunity 71, no. 9 (2003): 4996–5004.
- La Flamme, Anne Camille, Elisabeth A. Patton, Beverley Bauman, and Edward J. Pearce. "IL-4 plays a crucial role in regulating oxidative damage in the liver during schistosomiasis." The Journal of Immunology 166, no. 3 (2001): 1903–1911.
