= 1998 Burkinabé presidential election =

First re-election of Blaise Compaoré

- 15 November 1998
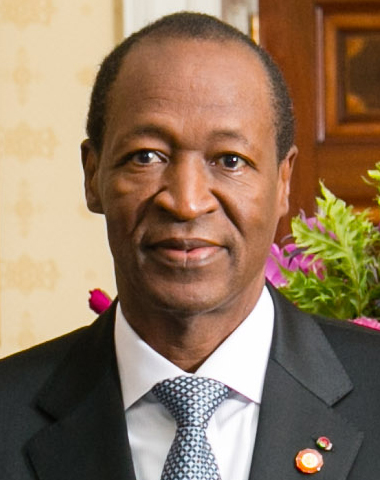

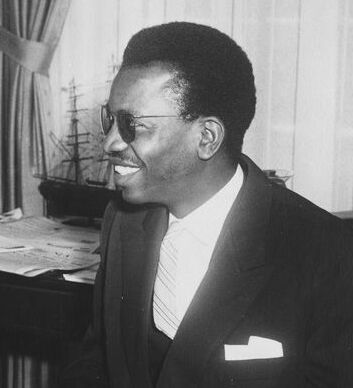
Nominee	Blaise Compaoré	Ram Ouédraogo	Frédéric Guirma
Party	CDP	UVDB	UDV-RDA
Popular vote	3,329,145	150,796	133,552
Percentage	87.53%	6.61%	5.86%
President before election
Blaise Compaoré
CDP
Elected President
Blaise Compaoré
CDP

Presidential elections were held in Burkina Faso on 15 November 1998. They were boycotted by the major opposition parties and resulted in a victory for incumbent president Blaise Compaoré, who was re-elected with 88% of the vote. Voter turnout was 56%.

== Background ==
The Burkinabé constitution had previously limited a president to two terms of seven years, but in 1997 the National Assembly amended the constitution to abolish term limits.

The elections were also the first in Burkina Faso to be overseen by an independent electoral commission. Opposition parties had issued a demand for independent oversight in February 1998, with the new commission created in May. Outside observers reported that the elections were generally free and fair, despite the opposition boycott.

== Results ==
Candidate	Party	Votes	%
Blaise Compaoré	Congress for Democracy and Progress	1,996,151	87.53
Ram Ouédraogo	Union of Greens for the Development of Burkina	150,796	6.61
Frédéric Guirma	Rejectors Front – African Democratic Rally	133,552	5.86
Total		2,280,499	100.00
Valid votes		2,280,499	96.23
Invalid/blank votes		89,458	3.77
Total votes		2,369,957	100.00
Registered voters/turnout		4,226,358	56.08
Source: Nohlen et al. (Note: The total number of valid votes (2,280,496) reported by the electoral commission was three less than the total votes received by each candidate)

== Aftermath ==
A month after the elections journalist Norbert Zongo was murdered. His newspaper had recently published articles accusing Compaoré's brother of complicity in the torture and murder of a chauffeur who worked at the Presidential Palace.

Public outrage over Zongo's murder led to a set of governmental reforms including the reinstitution of term limits. The 1998 elections began Compaoré's second term, and in principle should have disqualified him from running in future elections. However, he ran for re-election in 2005, claiming that the term limit changes did not apply retroactively.
