= Union of Democratic Peasants/Party of Labour =

Political party in Burkina Faso

Union of Democratic Peasants/Party of Labour (French: Union des paysans démocrates/Parti du travail, UPD/PT) was a political party in Burkina Faso. The party was founded January 15, 2002. The party strives to achieve self-reliance in agricultural production.

In the 2006 municipal elections, UPD/PT obtained 46 votes.

On 29 January 2026, all parties, including this one, were dissolved through decree by the junta government in Burkina Faso.
