= Convention for Democracy and Federation =

Political party in Burkina Faso

The Convention for Democracy and Federation (French: Convention pour la Démocratie et la Fédération, CDF) was a political party in Burkina Faso.

== History ==
The party was established in 1998, and joined the Coalition of Democratic Forces prior to the 2002 parliamentary elections. The coalition received 4% of the vote and won five seats in the National Assembly.

In the lead up to the 2007 elections, the CDF formed the Convention of Democratic Forces alliance, alongside the Greens of Burkina, the Convention for Democracy and Liberty and the Rally for Independent Forces/Party of the Youth of Burkina. The Convention received 2.34% of the vote, winning three seats. The alliance saw a small increase in its vote share in the 2012 elections, as it received 2.4% of the vote, retaining its three seats.
