= Organization for Popular Democracy – Labour Movement =

Organization for Popular Democracy-Labour Movement Organisation pour la démocratie populaire – Mouvement du travail
- Abbreviation: ODP–MT
- Leader: Arsène Bongnessan Yé, Nabaho Kanidoua, Roch Marc Christian Kaboré
- Founded: April 1989
- Dissolved: 6 February 1996
- Merger of: UCB, OMR, ULC-LF factions, GCB factions
- Succeeded by: Congress for Democracy and Progress
- Newspaper: Yeelen
- Ideology: Until 1991: Marxism-Leninism

The Organization for Popular Democracy – Labour Movement (French: Organisation pour la Démocratie Populaire - Mouvement du Travail) was the ruling political party in Burkina Faso from 1989 to 1996. It was founded in April 1989 by the Union of Burkinabè Communists, the Revolutionary Military Organization (OMR) and factions from Communist Struggle Union - The Flame and Burkinabè Communist Group as a party based on Marxism, but strongly pragmatic, adopting the free market in its economic plan. It renounced Marxism–Leninism in March 1991.

In February 1996 the ODP-MT merged into the Congress for Democracy and Progress.

In the parliamentary election held on May 24, 1992, it won 48.2% of the popular vote and 70 out of 107 seats.

The ODP-MT was led by Arsène Bongnessan Yé, Nabaho Kanidoua and Roch Marc Christian Kaboré.

It published Yeelen.

== Electoral history ==
=== Presidential elections ===
Election	Party candidate	Votes	%	Result
1991	Blaise Compaoré	750,146	100%	Elected ✓

=== National Assembly elections ===
Election	Votes	%	Seats	+/–	Position	Result
1992	590,808	48.5%	78 / 107	▲78	▲1st	Supermajority government
