= Battle of Schosshalde =

Battle fought between Bern and the House of Habsburg in 1289

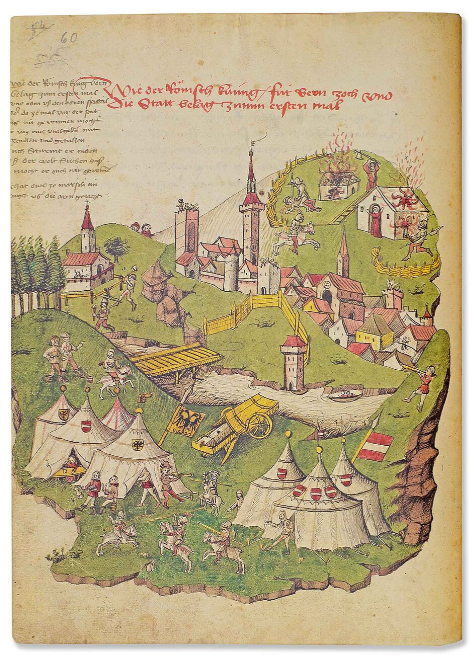
- Artwork from the Tschachtlanchronik depicting the Siege of Bern. Austrian and Imperial banners can be seen along with multiple buildings set on fire by Habsburg soldiers.
Date	27 April 1289
Location	Schosshalde, Switzerland, between Bern and Ostermundigen
Result	Habsburg Victory, which led to the eventual surrender of Bern and enforcement of Habsburg demands

Belligerents
Bern	House of Habsburg

Commanders and leaders
	Rudolf I of Habsburg Rudolf II, Duke of Austria

Strength
Several hundred men	300–400 Horsemen

Casualties and losses
Around 100 Dead and 150 Captured	Likely less than the Bernese

The Battle of Schosshalde was fought between the imperial city of Bern and the House of Habsburg on 27 April 1289 just outside Bern (between Bern and Ostermundigen). Though the premise of the battle was over Bern's refusal to pay imperial taxes, the battle represented the growing power struggle between the many states in Swabia. It allowed King Rudolf I to further expand Habsburg influence in Swabia, but it preserved Bern's status as an imperial city, and likely was a factor in the formation of the Old Swiss Confederacy in 1291, as multiple Swiss states grew worried at the growing encroachment of the Habsburgs.

== Background ==
The city of Bern was founded in 1191 by the Dukes of Zahringen. In 1218, Bern was elevated to the status of Free Imperial City, due to the dissolution of the House of Zahringen in the same year. From here, the city of Bern quickly expanded. By the late 1200s, the recent collapse of the House of Hohenstaufen led to a period of chaos within the Holy Roman Empire, known as the Great Interregnum, along with the dissolution of the former Hohenstaufen crown lands in Swabia. Due to these events, a power vacuum was left behind in the region, which included modern day Switzerland, and the city of Bern.

The House of Habsburg, which had managed to acquire the Imperial crown, was one of the major competitors in the region. They owned large amounts of territory in Swabia, acquiring land from the defunct House of Kyburg, and after their acquisition of Austria following the Battle of Marchfeld, they had secured a strong powerbase. When King Rudolf I, the Habsburg King of the Romans, raised taxes to 40%, the city of Bern resisted.

== Battle ==
Bern, which was heavily in debt, refused to pay the taxes. Instead, the city turned to an anti-Habsburg alliance, which included Burgundy and Savoy for protection, both of which were eager to expand their influence in Swabia as well. Bern would provide military aid to Burgundy on multiple occasions. In 1288, Rudolf decided to finally crush Bern for good with a strong army. However, Bern was a very well protected city. Both in June and August, Rudolf tried to capture the city, attempting an assault in September. However, both attempts failed.

After a year of failing to successfully capture the city, King Rudolf abandoned the siege, and left his son, Duke Rudolf II of Austria, to assume command. Rudolf II sent an army to Bern and prepared an ambush outside of the city while harassing the landscape in an attempt to draw out a sortie. Habsburg armies burned down farms and buildings. 300-400 mounted horsemen were then secretly planted in the hilled forests of Schosshalde, ready to ambush any Bernese soldiers that chased after the Habsburg armies.

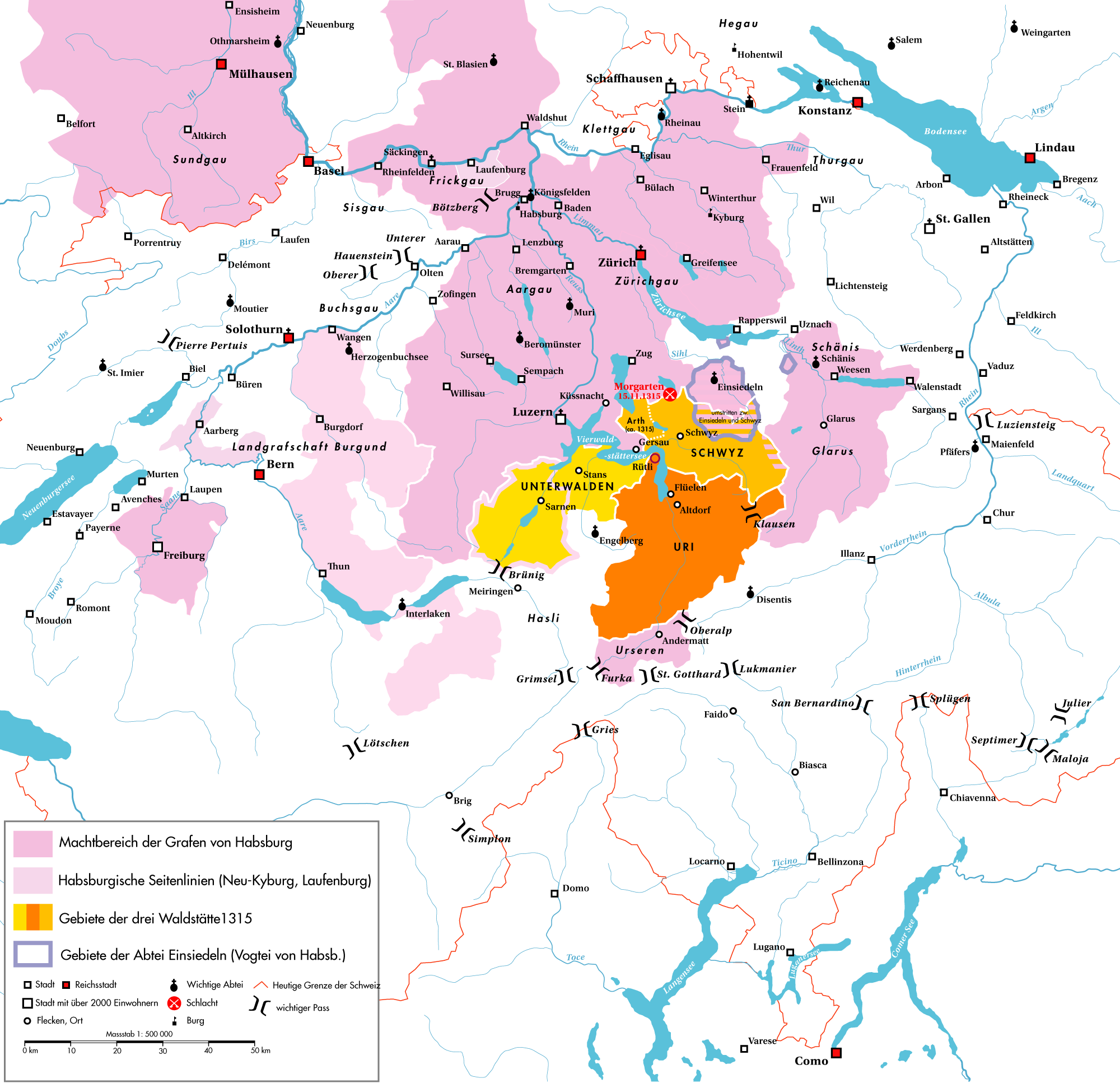
Habsburg territories (in pink) in Switzerland circa 1315. The city of Bern is found near the left side of the map and is almost surrounded by Habsburg lands. The Old Swiss Confederacy is shown in various shades of orange and yellow.

Rudolf II then ordered a "sham" assault on the lower gates of Bern. The plan worked, and a large detachment of Bernese soldiers left the walls to fight the Habsburgs outside the city. The Bernese soldiers were disorganized in their pursuit of the Habsburg soldiers, and not prepared for the impending ambush. The Habsburg cavalry emerged and routed the Bernese men, killing around 100 men, along with taking another 150 men prisoner. Amongst the dead was Count Ludwig of Homberg, a relative of King Rudolf. Following this defeat, the remainder of Bern's garrison agreed to surrender, and accepted Habsburg demands. The city was also plundered.

== Aftermath ==
The following negotiations were held in the city of Baden. Bern was forced to accept taxes and reparation payments. Bern was also to build an altar for Ludwig of Homberg. Rudolf II also wished to dismantle Bern's defensive walls, which had given the Habsburgs much trouble. However, Rudolf I prevented it, and allowed the walls to stand. Despite being defeated, Bern was allowed to retain its status as an imperial city and its independence would be confirmed by King Adolf I in 1293. Thus, Bern's expansion in Switzerland would continue.

Rudolf I would continue to spread his influence in Switzerland as well. He acquired ecclesiastical posts in Glarus for his sons, integrated Rapperswil, and gained property in St. Gallen and Murbach. These acquisitions, along with the previous Habsburg lands in Swabia, would form the collective lands of Further Austria, a crownland of the Habsburg Monarchy.

Following the death of Rudolf I, a group of Swiss states agreed to form the Swiss Confederacy in 1291, in order to protect themselves from surrounding threats, such as the Habsburgs. The Swiss would fight the Habsburgs on multiple occasions, culminating in the Battle of Laupen, which led to Bern joining the Old Swiss Confederacy in 1353.
