= Alternative Faso =

Political party in Burkina Faso

Alternative Faso Le Faso Autrement
- Leader: Ablassé Ouedraogo
- Founded: 30 June 2011
- Dissolved: 29 January 2026
- Ideology: Liberalism; Pro-democracy
- International affiliation: Liberal International
- National Assembly: 1 / 127

Website
- www.lefasoautrement.org

Alternative Faso (French: Le Faso Autrement, FA) was a liberal political party in Burkina Faso led by Ablassé Ouedraogo.

== History ==
The party was established by Ouédraogo on 30 June 2011. It received 1.3% of the vote in the 2012 parliamentary elections, winning a single seat in the National Assembly.

All political parties in Burkina Faso were dissolved through decree by the junta on 29 January 2026.
