= Greens of Burkina =

Political party in Burkina Faso

- Founded: 1991
- Dissolved: 29 January 2026 (8 days)
- Ideology: Green politics
- Regional affiliation: Federation of Green Parties of Africa (Observer)

The Greens of Burkina (French: Les Verts du Burkina, VB) was a political party in Burkina Faso.

== History ==
The party was established in 1991 as the Union of Greens for the Development of Burkina (Union des Verts pour le Développement du Burkina, UVDB), and was initially led by Ali Kassamba. The UVDB contested the 1992 and 1997 parliamentary elections, but failed to win a seat.

The UVDB nominated Ram Ouédraogo as its candidate for the 1998 presidential election. Ouédraogo finished second in the vote with 6.6%, losing to incumbent Blaise Compaoré.

The party split after the 2002 parliamentary elections, with a faction led by Ouédraogo leaving to form the Rally of the Ecologists of Burkina, with the remainder of the party renamed Greens of Faso.

In the lead up to the 2007 elections, the party joined the Convention of Democratic Forces alliance, alongside the Convention for Democracy and Federation, the Convention for Democracy and Liberty and the Rally for Independent Forces/Party of the Youth of Burkina. The Convention received 2.34% of the vote, winning three seats. The alliance saw a small increase in its vote share in the 2012 elections, as it received 2.4% of the vote, retaining its three seats.
