= February 14th Group =

- Founded: February 1997
- Ideology: Big tent Factions: Communism; Socialism; Sankaraism; Democratic socialism Social democracy

The February 14 Group (French: Groupe du 14 Février) is a political alliance in Burkina Faso (former Upper Volta). It was founded in February 1997 and consists of the following parties.

- Front of Social Forces (FFS)
- Patriotic Front for Change (FPC)
- Group of Patriotic Democrats (GDP)
- African Independence Party (PAI)
- Party for Democracy and Progress / Socialist Party (PDP/PS)
- Party of the Independent Forces for Development (PFID)
- Republican National Party / Just Way (PNR/JV)
- Union for Rebirth / Sankarist Movement (UNIR/MS)
- Party for Democracy and Socialism (PDS)
