= Ram Ouédraogo =

Burkinabé politician

- Born: January 2, 1950 (age 75); Agboville, Côte d'Ivoire
- Notable work: In the 13 November 2005 presidential election, Ouédraogo placed fifth out of 13 candidates, receiving 2.04% of the vote.

Ram Ouédraogo (born January 2, 1950) is a Burkinabé politician and leader of the Rally of the Ecologists of Burkina (RDEB) party.

== Early life ==
Ouédraogo was born in Agboville, Côte d'Ivoire, to Burkinabé parents from Passoré Province. He studied management and accounting at the Institut d'études commerciales Grand-Jean in Abidjan, which is located in the Ivory Coast, from 1969 to 1972. He returned to Burkina Faso in 1984 after the Republic of Upper Volta was dissolved. After returning, he worked in multiple jobs as an accountant, private detective, and journalist.

== Political career ==
Ouédraogo founded the Union of Greens of Burkina Faso, an ecologist party, in 1990. He ran as the candidate of the Union of Greens for the Development of Burkina (UVDB) in the presidential election held on 15 November 1998, placing second behind incumbent Blaise Compaoré with 6.61% of the vote. He later quit the UVDB and founded the RDEB party.

From 1999 to 2002, Ouédraogo served in the government as Minister of State for National Reconciliation.

In the 13 November 2005 presidential election, Ouédraogo placed fifth out of 13 candidates, receiving 2.04% of the vote. He ran again in the 2015 Burkinabè general election, winning just 0.68% of the national vote for president. He announced his retirement from politics soon after, saying he would leave the party to a new generation.

He still remains an observer of politics, and in 2017 was elected vice-president of the Global Greens. His candidacy was presented to the organization by the Federation of the Greens of Africa, which he helped co-found. He has also led his own organization called the Gold Foundation.
