= Party for Democracy and Rally =

The Party for Democracy and Rally (French: Parti pour la démocratie et le rassemblement, PDR) was a political party in Burkina Faso led by Daouda Bayili.

== History ==
The party was formed on 27 August 1993 by Bayili, one of the two MPs for the African Independence Party.

In 1996 it merged into the new Congress for Democracy and Progress.
