= Jean-Marc Palm =

Burkinabe politician

Jean-Marc Palm (31 December 1950 – 14 May 2026) was a Burkinabé politician. He was minister of foreign affairs of Burkina Faso from 1987 to 1989. Palm died on 14 May 2026, at the age of 75.
