= Organisation for Democracy and Labour =

Political party in Burkina Faso

Organisation for Democracy and Labour Organisation pour la démocratie et le travail
- Abbreviation: ODT
- Chairman: Moïse Sawadogo
- Legalised: 14 April 2003 (23 years, 109 days)
- Dissolved: 29 January 2026 (184 days)
- National Assembly of Burkina Faso (2012): 1 / 127
- Municipal Councils (2012): 46 / 18,548

The Organisation for Democracy and Labour (French: Organisation pour la démocratie et le travail, ODT) was a political party in Burkina Faso. The party supported the government of Blaise Compaoré. As of 2013 Moïse Sawadogo was the chairman of the party. The slogan of the party is 'Democracy - Work - Justice'.

The party was registered with the Burkinabé authorities for the first time on April 14, 2003. It was re-registered in 2007 and 2011.

The party contested elections for the first time in 2006, fielding candidates in local polls. 17 ODT municipal councilors were elected.

The party won one seat in the 2012 legislative election. The party general secretary Dieudonné Sawadogo was elected from Bam Province. The provincial list of the party got 12,813 votes. The national list of the party got 62,479 votes (2.07%). The party also contested the 2012 municipal elections, fielding candidates in 20 municipalities. The party won 46 seats. The party won the mayoral post of Guibaré.

In August–September 2013 ODT underwent an internal crisis. On August 31, 2013 Dieudonné Sawadogo organized an extraordinary party congress in Kongoussi, which declared Moïse Sawadogo deposed and named Mahamoudou Sawadogo as new party chairman. In response, in September 2013, Moïse Sawadogo declared Dieudonné Sawadogo and eight other party members expelled, citing 'high treason' against the party.

On 29 January 2026, all parties, including this one, were dissolved through decree by the junta government in Burkina Faso.
