= Ecological Party for Progress =

Former political party in Burkina Faso

The Ecological Party for Progress (French: Parti écologiste pour le Progrès, PEP) was a political party in Burkina Faso. It was led by Charles Salvi Somé. PEP was registered on May 6, 1991. In 1995 PEP merged with the Party for Social Democracy of Valère Somé and the Democratic Action Group, forming the Party for Unified Social Democracy (PDSU).
