= United Democratic Republican Front =

United Democratic Republican Front was a political party in Nepal. The president of the Front was Ram Man Shrestha (former CPN(ML) Upper House Member).

On May 11, 2007, the Front merged into the Communist Party of Nepal (Maoist). At the time of the merger, the membership of the Front was estimated at 400.
