= Rally of Social-Democrat Independents =

- Leader: Alain Bédouma Yoda
- Founded: Recognised 6 January 1992
- Dissolved: 1996
- Merged into: Congress for Democracy and Progress
- Ideology: Social democracy
- Political position: Center-left

The Rally of Social-Democrat Independents (French: Rassemblement des Sociaux Démocrates Indépendants, RSI) was a political party in Burkina Faso led by Alain Bédouma Yoda.

== History ==
The party was officially recognised on 6 January 1992, and won a single seat in the May 1992 parliamentary elections. In 1996 it merged into the new Congress for Democracy and Progress.
