= Voltaic Communist Organization =

Voltaic Communist Organization Organisation communiste voltaïque
- Founded: 1971
- Dissolved: 1978
- Succeeded by: Union of Communist Struggles; Voltaic Revolutionary Communist Party
- Ideology: Communism; Marxism-Leninism; Maoism
- Political position: Far-left

The Voltaic Communist Organization (French: Organisation communiste voltaïque, OCV) was a Marxist-Leninist party in the country now known as Burkina Faso. It was founded in 1971 out of the student milieu. In 1978 OCV split in two, the pro-China Communist Struggle Union (ULC) and the pro-Albanian Voltaic Revolutionary Communist Party (PCRV).
