= Dabaré =

Coordinates: 12°39′N 1°36′W

- Town
- Interactive map of Dabaré
- Country: Burkina Faso
- Region: Centre-Est Region
- Province: Boulgou Province
- Department: Bané Department

Population (2019)
  - Total: 1,852

Dabaré is a town in the Bané Department of Boulgou Province in south-eastern Burkina Faso.

Population
Year	Pop.	±%
1985	667	—
2006	1,312	+96.7%
2019	1,852	+41.2%
