= Union of Communist Struggles =

Union of Communist Struggles Union de Luttes Communistes
- Founded: 14 October 1979
- Dissolved: 1981
- Split from: Voltaic Communist Organization
- Succeeded by: Union of Communist Struggles - Reconstructed
- Ideology: Communism; Marxism-Leninism
- Political position: Left-wing

Union of Communist Struggles (French: Union de Luttes Communistes, ULC) was a Marxist-Leninist party in the country now known as Burkina Faso. ULC was formed out of a split of the Voltaic Communist Organization (OCV). It was constituted on 14 October 1979. ULC promoted 'Popular and Democratic Revolution' (RDP).

In 1981 ULC dissolved. In 1983 it was reconstituted, and known as Union of Communist Struggles - Reconstructed (ULC-R).

The ULC published Prolétaire and Révolution Bolchévique.
