= Hermann Yaméogo =

Burkinabé politician

- Born: August 27, 1948 (age 78); Koudougou, French Upper Volta
- Political party: National Union for Democracy and Development
- Father: Maurice Yaméogo

Hermann Yaméogo (born August 27, 1948) is a Burkinabé politician and leader of the National Union for Democracy and Development (UNDD).

Although he decided to boycott the 13 November 2005 presidential elections a month prior to the poll, his name remained on the ballot. He was placed 11th out of 13 candidates, receiving 0.76% of the vote.

He was born in Koudougou, the son of Maurice Yaméogo, who was the country's first president.

In July 2025, Hermann Yaméogo was abducted from his home by unidentified individuals after criticizing the actions of Ibrahim Traore's Burkinabe junta.
