= Coalition of Democratic Forces (Burkina Faso) =

Political alliance in Burkina Faso

The Coalition of Democratic Forces (French: Coalition des Forces Démocratiques, CFD) was a political alliance in Burkina Faso.

== History ==
The CFD was formed in the run-up to the 2002 parliamentary elections as an alliance of the Convention for Democracy and Federation (CDF), the Union of Greens for the Development of Burkina (UVDB), the Movement for Tolerance and Progress (MTP) and the African Democratic Rally–Refusers' Front.

The alliance won five seats in the elections, and was given a cabinet post responsible for primary education and literacy.

The CDF and the Greens (a successor to the UVDB) later formed the Convention of Democratic Forces alliance prior to the 2007 elections.
