= Convention of Democratic Forces =

- Founded: 2007
- Ideology: Big tent Democracy; Factions; Green politics

The Convention of Democratic Forces (French: Convention des Forces Démocratiques, CFD) was a political alliance in Burkina Faso.

== History ==
The CFD was established prior to the 2007 parliamentary elections as an alliance of the Convention for Democracy and Federation, the Greens of Burkina (both of which had previously been members of the Coalition of Democratic Forces), the Convention for Democracy and Liberty and the Rally for Independent Forces/Party of the Youth of Burkina.

The alliance won three seats in the 2007 elections, and retained all three in the 2012 election.
