= Alliance for Progress and Freedom =

Political party in Burkina Faso

The Alliance for Progress and Freedom (French: Alliance pour le Progrès et la Liberté) was a political party in Burkina Faso. At the last legislative elections, 5 May 2002, the party won 0.7% of the popular vote and one out of 111 seats.

On 29 January 2026, all parties, including this one, were dissolved through decree by the junta government in Burkina Faso.
