= Union of Communist Struggles – Reconstructed =

Union of Communist Struggles – Reconstructed Union des Luttes Communistes – Reconstruite
- Founded: 1983
- Preceded by: Union of Communist Struggles
- Ideology: Communism; Marxism–Leninism
- Political position: Left-wing

The Union of Communist Struggles – Reconstructed (French: Union des Luttes Communistes – Reconstruite, ULC-R) was a Marxist-Leninist party in Burkina Faso. ULC-R was formed in 1983 as a continuation of the Union of Communist Struggles (ULC). Generally ULC-R was simply called 'ULC'. ULC-R promoted 'Popular and Democratic Revolution' (RDP).

The ULC-R supported the revolutionary government of Thomas Sankara. From August 3, 1983, to August 1984, the ULC-R held three ministerial posts. Its support for Sankara's government provoked the ULC-R section in France to split away from the mother organization.

After the break between Sankara and the Patriotic League for Development (LIPAD) in August 1984, the position of the ULC-R was somewhat strengthened. The ULC-R held four cabinet posts in the new government, Basile Guissou (Foreign Affairs), Adele Ouédrago (Budget), Alain Coeffé (Transport and Communications) and Joséphine Ouédraogo (Family and National Solidarity).

In 1987, Sankara tried to marginalize a dissident faction of the ULC-R. This was one of the factors that provoked the coup d'état of Blaise Compaoré.

In 1989, the ULC-R resigned from the government, following its refusal to go along with the formation of the Organization for Popular Democracy – Labour Movement (ODP/MT). The ULC-R entered a clandestine existence. The government tried to rally dissidents of ULC-R into its new party. In March 1990, it was renamed the Party of Social Democracy.
