= Flammé (vexillology) =

Alternate flag pattern uaed by the Old Swiss Confederacy

Reconstructed Flammé.

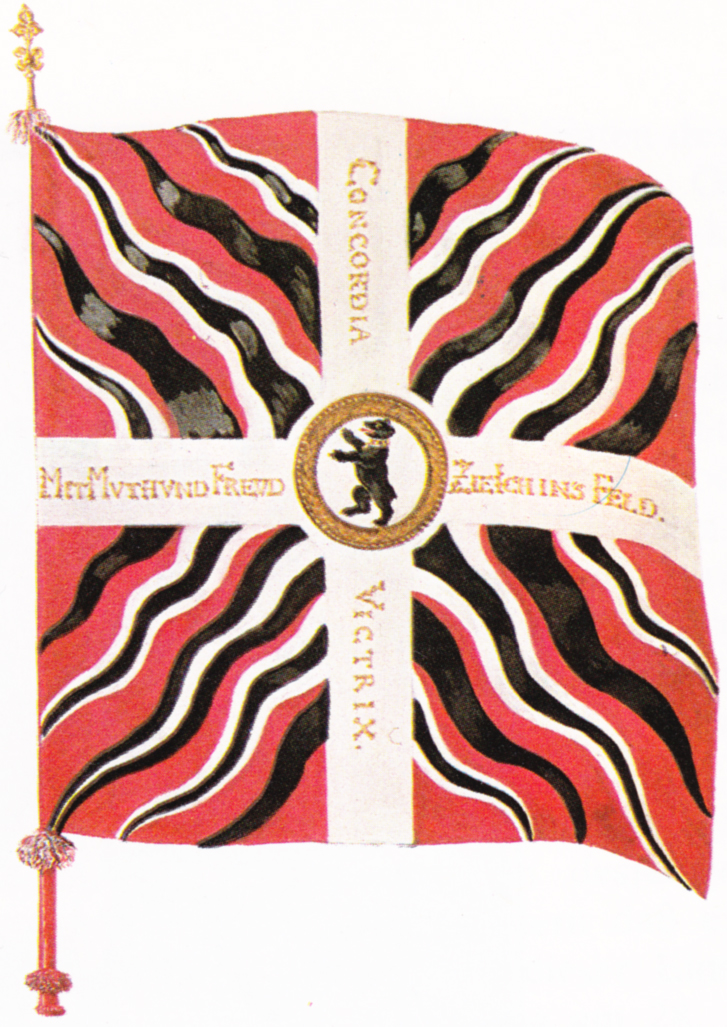
18th century flag of the city of St. Gallen.

Flammé (German geflammt) is a term in vexillology for a flag design that places a coat of arms in the center of the flag, filling the remaining space on the flag with flame-like designs. The design was used specifically in the Old Swiss Confederacy during the 17th and 18th centuries, where there was no difference between coat of arms and flags, and the same design was used for both. Regiments of Swiss mercenaries during the 18th century, especially those in French service, often used flammé designs with the Swiss Cross superimposed rather than a coat of arms.
