= 2012 Burkinabé parliamentary election =

- 2 December 2012
- All 127 seats in the National Assembly; 64 seats needed for a majority
- Turnout: 75.96% (▲19.53 pp)
Party	Leader	Vote %	Seats	+/–
CDP	Blaise Compaoré	48.66	70	−3
UPC	Zéphirin Diabré	11.09	19	New
ADF-RDA	Gilbert Noël Ouédraogo	11.24	18	+4
UPR	Toussaint Abel Coulibaly	3.08	5	0
UNIR/PS	Bénéwendé Stanislas Sankara	4.36	4	0
CFD	–	2.40	3	0
PDS/Metba	Hama Arba Diallo	3.94	2	New
ODT	Moïse Sawadogo	2.07	1	+1
UNDD	–	1.45	1	+1
FA	Ablassé Ouedraogo	1.34	1	New
RDB	Celestin Saidou Compaoré	0.97	1	−1
RDS	Salfo Théodore Ouédraogo	0.78	1	New
CNPB	Jourouboundou René Lompo	0.45	1	New
This lists parties that won seats. See the complete results below.
Results by constituency
Prime Minister before	Prime Minister after
Luc-Adolphe Tiao; CDP	Luc-Adolphe Tiao; CDP

Parliamentary elections were held in Burkina Faso on 2 December 2012. They were the first elections held since the National Assembly dissolved the National Electoral Commission in 2011, following fraud allegations concerning the 2010 presidential elections. Municipal elections for over 18,000 councillors were held simultaneously. The elections were held amidst a period of political uncertainty, following protests against President Blaise Compaore's regime.

The result was a victory for the ruling Congress for Democracy and Progress (CDP), which won 70 of the 127 seats in the National Assembly.

== Background ==
The 2010 presidential elections were criticized by opposition leaders and independent observers for various missteps in democratic practice. Reported issues included the inappropriate influence of traditional leaders, ballot and voting card shortages at polling stations, inaccurate electoral lists and a misappropriation of resources by the state for Compaore's re-election campaign.

== Electoral system ==
The 127 members of the National Assembly were elected for five-year terms, of which 111 were elected in 45 multi-member constituencies ranging in size from two to nine seats, with the remaining 16 elected in a single nationwide constituency. The elections were conducted using closed list proportional representation. Individual candidates won seats based on their position on the party list, the order of which was decided by each party's leadership.

Opposition parties criticized the government's inability to reliably determine voter eligibility. In response, the government created a biometric voter identification system, and the National Assembly dissolved the existent Electoral Commission. Pryce and Nascimento noted that these steps, along with government campaigns to encourage women's involvement in politics, mark a movement towards sounder political practices in Burkina Faso.

== Campaign ==
Around 3,000 candidates ran in the 45 provincial constituencies, with 74 parties and electoral alliances competed for the 16 national seats.

The CDP was supported by the Alliance for Democracy and Federation – African Democratic Rally, which was still considered an opposition party. The Union for Progress and Change (UPC), formed by a CDP defector, gained attention as a possible challenger to the CDP prior to the election as it protested he party's attempts to lengthen President Compaore's term via a constitutional amendment that aimed to remove presidential term limits.

Other minor parties emphasized ideological connections to Thomas Sankara, Compaore's predecessor, with four parties considering themselves Sankarist, including the National Council for Rebirth–Sankarist Movement, Pan-African Union for Sankarism–Progressive Movement, Union for Democratic Rebirth–Sankarist Movement and the Union for Rebirth / Sankarist Movement.

== Conduct ==
According to domestic and international observers, efficiency and legitimacy improved in the 2012 elections after the government introduced electoral reforms, though opposition forces claimed the ruling party used state resources in its campaign. The elections were observed by 37 parties, all from 21 members of the African Union. There were also a small number of domestic observers, most associated with non-partisan non-governmental organizations, including the Centre for Democratic Governance and the Independent Observatory of Elections.

Bernard Makuza, head of the African Union electoral observer mission, declared the elections free and fair, though he decried public apathy toward the elections, especially in the cities. However, the UPC claimed there was vote rigging in Kadiogo Province, following a delay in reporting ballot counts. UPC campaign director Nathaneal Ouedrego declared his intention to "give proof of fraud and irregularities in Kadiogo in the next days in order to demand pure and simply the cancellation of elections in that province".

== Results ==
Just under 76% of eligible voters participated in the elections, the highest turnout since multi-party politics was reintroduced in 2002, possibly due to the perceived viability of opposition to the CDP. Support in some electoral districts shifted from the CDP to the UPC, leading to a notable decrease in the CDP's popular vote count, although it only lost three seats. The UPC secured as many votes as the ADF–RDA, and more votes than any other opposition party. Overall, thirteen parties won seats.

Party	Votes	%	Seats			
Party	Votes	%	National	Regional	Total	+/–
Congress for Democracy and Progress	1,467,749	48.66	8	62	70	–3
Alliance for Democracy and Federation – African Democratic Rally	338,970	11.24	2	16	18	+4
Union for Progress and Reform	334,453	11.09	2	17	19	New
Union for Rebirth / Sankarist Party	131,592	4.36	1	3	4	0
Party for Democracy and Socialism/Metba	118,713	3.94	1	1	2	0
Union for the Republic	92,935	3.08	1	4	5	0
Convention of Democratic Forces	72,299	2.40	1	2	3	0
Organisation for Democracy and Labour	62,479	2.07	0	1	1	New
National Union for Democracy and Development	43,795	1.45	0	1	1	+1
Alternative Faso	40,310	1.34	0	1	1	New
Rally for the Development of Burkina	29,164	0.97	0	1	1	–1
National Rebirth Party	26,125	0.87	0	0	0	–1
National Alliance for Development–Social Justice Party	23,719	0.79	0	0	0	New
Rally for Democracy and Socialism	23,504	0.78	0	1	1	New
Social Forces Front	22,090	0.73	0	0	0	–1
National Convention for the Progress of Burkina	13,505	0.45	0	1	1	New
Rally of the Republicans	11,989	0.40	0	0	0	New
African Movement of the Peoples	11,702	0.39	0	0	0	New
Rally of the Ecologists of Burkina	11,539	0.38	0	0	0	0
Party for Democracy and Progress / Socialist Party	11,316	0.38	0	0	0	–2
Patriotic Party for Development	9,360	0.31	0	0	0	New
Party of Independence, Labour and Justice	8,139	0.27	0	0	0	New
Union for Democratic Rebirth/Sankarist Movement	7,769	0.26	0	0	0	New
Independent Party of Burkina	7,512	0.25	0	0	0	New
Patriotic Movement for the Renewal of Burkina	6,913	0.23	0	0	0	New
Party for National Unity and Development	5,093	0.17	0	0	0	New
National Democratic Convention	4,976	0.16	0	0	0	New
Rally for Independent Forces/Party of the Youth of Burkina	4,883	0.16	0	0	0	New
Alternative Burkina–Party for Socialism and Reformation	4,783	0.16	0	0	0	New
Union of Centrist Forces	4,623	0.15	0	0	0	New
Alliance for Rebirth, Democracy and Integration	3,897	0.13	0	0	0	New
African Progressive Movement	3,805	0.13	0	0	0	New
Alliance of Revolutionary Democrats	3,726	0.12	0	0	0	0
Alliance of Progressive Forces	3,519	0.12	0	0	0	New
Burkinabé People's Party	3,406	0.11	0	0	0	New
Movement of the People for Socialism–Federal Party	3,243	0.11	0	0	0	0
Union of Patriots for Development	2,997	0.10	0	0	0	0
Union of Democrats for Social Progress	2,807	0.09	0	0	0	New
National Convention for Reform	2,468	0.08	0	0	0	0
Union of Progressive Forces	2,436	0.08	0	0	0	0
Alliance for Democracy of Faso	2,091	0.07	0	0	0	0
Pro-Democratic Organisation for the Defence of Nature	2,062	0.07	0	0	0	New
Republican Party for Total Independence	1,962	0.07	0	0	0	New
Party for the Rebirth of Democracy in Faso	1,740	0.06	0	0	0	New
Unified Socialist Party	1,470	0.05	0	0	0	0
National Union for Independence and Solidarity	1,401	0.05	0	0	0	0
Party for Progress and National Renewal	1,391	0.05	0	0	0	0
National Council for the Renaissance–Sankarist Movement	1,315	0.04	0	0	0	0
National Party of Social Democrats	1,313	0.04	0	0	0	New
Pan-African Movement of Faso	1,297	0.04	0	0	0	0
Union for the People's Movement	1,283	0.04	0	0	0	New
Social Union of Burkina	1,186	0.04	0	0	0	0
Party of Patriotic Progressives	1,102	0.04	0	0	0	New
Convention for Democracy and Liberty	1,077	0.04	0	0	0	New
Union for the Democratic Rebirth of Burkina	936	0.03	0	0	0	New
Movement for Progress and Reform	870	0.03	0	0	0	New
People's Council for Action	849	0.03	0	0	0	New
Patriotic Movement for Alternation	810	0.03	0	0	0	New
Party of Pan-African Patriots	791	0.03	0	0	0	New
Patriotic Front for Change	715	0.02	0	0	0	0
Greens of Faso	680	0.02	0	0	0	0
Party for the Protection of the Environment/Nature Conservation	678	0.02	0	0	0	0
Patriotic Rally of Salvation	671	0.02	0	0	0	New
Pan-African Union for Sankarism–Progressive Movement	658	0.02	0	0	0	New
People's Movement for Democracy	656	0.02	0	0	0	New
Union for Democracy and Development	510	0.02	0	0	0	New
Alliance for the Republic and Democracy	402	0.01	0	0	0	New
Patriotic Movement of Democratic Youths	379	0.01	0	0	0	0
New Political Rally	363	0.01	0	0	0	New
Union of Democratic Forces of Burkina	359	0.01	0	0	0	New
Centrist Party for Democracy and Progress	353	0.01	0	0	0	New
National Union for Democracy and Progress	338	0.01	0	0	0	0
Union of Democratic Forces and Progressives	281	0.01	0	0	0	New
Fasocrat Party	87	0.00	0	0	0	New
Total	3,016,379	100.00	16	111	127	+16
Valid votes	3,016,379	90.97				
Invalid/blank votes	299,416	9.03				
Total votes	3,315,795	100.00				
Registered voters/turnout	4,365,153	75.96				
Source: CENI, Psephos
