= New Social Democracy (Burkina Faso) =

Political party in Burkina Faso

New Social Democracy (French: Nouvelle Démocratie Sociale, NDS) was a political party in Burkina Faso.

Mamadou Samba Barry serves as its secretary general.

The NDS first participated in the 1992 parliamentary elections, which followed a growing movement towards a multi-party system in Burkina Faso. In the 1997 legislative elections, the party won 2,885 votes. This number decreased to 197 votes in the 2007 elections. In the most recent elections in 2015, the NDS received 165 votes. To date, the party has not gained a seat in the National Assembly of Burkina Faso.

On 29 January 2026, all parties, including this one, were dissolved through decree by the junta government in Burkina Faso.
