= Alliance for Democracy and Federation =

Political party in Burkina Faso

The Alliance for Democracy and Federation (Alliance pour la Démocratie et la Fédération) is a liberal party in Burkina Faso. It is part of the Alliance for Democracy and Federation-African Democratic Rally (Alliance pour la Démocratie et la Fédération-Rassemblement Démocratique Africain), the largest opposition party in the country, with the former ruling party African Democratic Rally.

== See also ==
- Liberal democracy
- Liberalism by country
