= National Union for Democracy and Development =

Political party in Burkina Faso

The National Union for Democracy and Development (French: Union Nationale pour la Démocratie et le Développement, UNDD) was a political party in Burkina Faso (former Upper Volta). A part of the country's opposition, the UNDD was led by Hermann Yaméogo, son of the country's first president Maurice Yaméogo. On January 29, 2026, Burkina Faso’s military-led government dissolved all political parties in the country.
