= Voltaic Revolutionary Communist Party =

Political party in Burkina Faso

Voltaic Revolutionary Communist Party Parti communiste révolutionnaire voltaïque
- Founded: 1 October 1978 (47 years, 364 days)
- Split from: Voltaic Communist Organization
- Newspaper: Bug-Parga
- Ideology: Communism; Marxism–Leninism; Hoxhaism
- Political position: Far-left
- International affiliation: ICMLPO
- Colors: Red

Website
- www.pcrv.net (archive)

The Voltaic Revolutionary Communist Party (French: Parti communiste révolutionnaire voltaïque, PCRV) is a Marxist-Leninist and Hoxhaist communist party in Burkina Faso. It was founded on 1 October 1978, following a split in the Voltaic Communist Organization (OCV).

The PCRV follows the political line of the now defunct Albanian Party of Labour, an anti-revisionist variant of Marxism–Leninism which came to be known as Hoxhaism. It promoted a "national democratic and popular revolution" (Révolution nationale démocratique et populaire, RNDP).

The 1983 Upper Voltan coup d'état elevated Thomas Sankara to power. At that time, the PCRV had powerful links in the trade unions and student movements. The party, however, refused to participate in Sankara's revolutionary government, arguing that a military coup was not the same as a popular revolution. In 1984, it again refused to participate in the government during a cabinet reshuffle. This led to a split and the formation of the Burkinabé Communist Group.

The PCRV is a participant in the International Conference of Marxist–Leninist Parties and Organizations (Unity & Struggle) or ICMLPO.

The party publishes Bug-Parga.

== See also ==
- List of anti-revisionist groups

== Bibliography ==
- Hagberg, Sten (2025). "Pain et liberté pour le peuple! Burkina Faso's Underground Communist Party PCRV, and its Public Presence in the Anti-Imperialist Struggle". African Studies Review. 68 (3): 492–512. doi:10.1017/asr.2025.10021.
