= Union of Burkinabé Communists =

Communist party in Burkina Faso

Union of Burkinabé Communists Union des Communistes Burkinabè
- Founded: August 1984
- Dissolved: 1989
- Merger of: GUML; Marxist–Leninist Group
- Merged into: Organization for Popular Democracy – Labour Movement
- Ideology: Communism; Marxism–Leninism
- Political position: Left-wing

The Union of Burkinabè Communists (French: Union des Communistes Burkinabè) was a Marxist-Leninist party in Burkina Faso. UCB was founded on 10 August 1984 by the fusion of four other Marxist groups. Its first president was Guillaume Sessouma.
