= Union of Communist Struggles – The Flame =

Union of Communist Struggles-The Flame
- Leader: Alain Zougba, Kader Cissé and Moïse Traoré
- Founded: February 1987
- Split from: Union of Communist Struggles – Reconstructed
- Ideology: Communism; Marxism-Leninism
- Political position: Left-wing

Union of Communist Struggles – The Flame (in French: Union des Luttes Communistes - La Flamme) was a Marxist-Leninist party in Burkina Faso. ULC-La Flamme was founded in February 1987 by split from the majority of the Union of Communist Struggles – Reconstructed. In 1991 it was renamed in Party of Social Progress.

Leaders of the party were Alain Zougba, Kader Cissé and Moïse Traoré.

The ULC-La Flamme published the periodical La Flamme.
