= Group of Patriotic Democrats =

Political party in Burkina Faso

The Group of Patriotic Democrats (French: Groupe des Démocrates Patriotes, GDP) was a political party in Burkina Faso (formerly Upper Volta) registered until 2012.

It was a leftist party founded in November 1987.

Its secretary general was Issa Tiendrebéogo.

At the legislative elections of 1997 the GDP won 0.6% of the popular vote and no seats.
