= Congress for Democracy and Progress =

Political party in Burkina Faso

Congress for Democracy and Progress Congrès pour la Démocratie et le Progrès
- Abbreviation: CDP
- Leader: Eddie Komboïgo
- Founder: Blaise Compaoré
- Founded: 6 February 1996
- Dissolved: 29 January 2026
- Merger of: Popular Front
- Preceded by: ODP–MT
- Headquarters: Ouagadougou
- Ideology: Social democracy Social liberalism
- Political position: Centre to centre-left

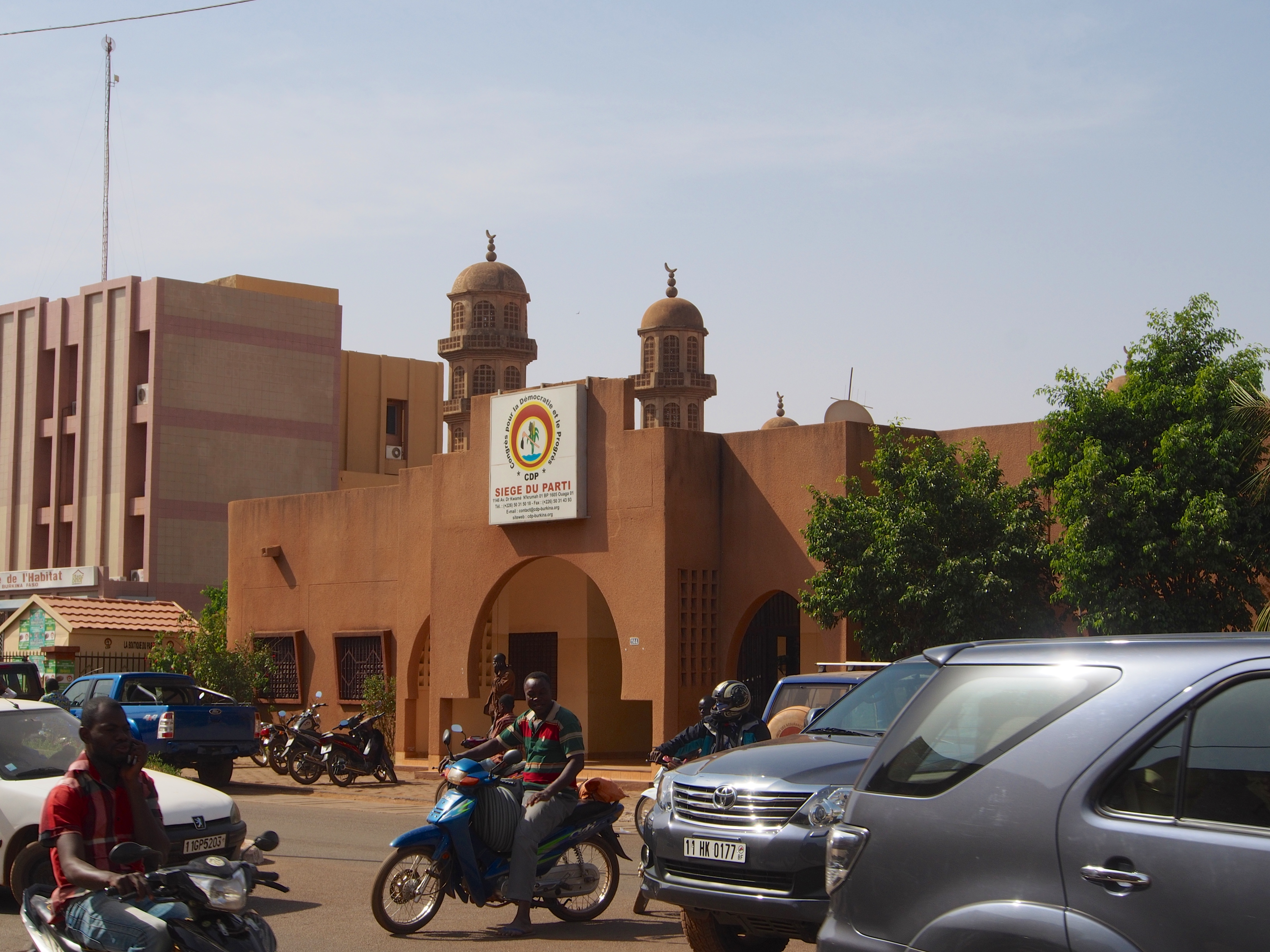
Headquarters of the party in Ouagadougou

The Congress for Democracy and Progress (French: Congrès pour la Démocratie et le Progrès, CDP) was the ruling party in Burkina Faso from 1996 until the overthrow of Blaise Compaoré in 2014.

== History ==
The party was founded in February 1996 by merger of the Organization for Popular Democracy – Labour Movement and nine parties supportive of it (the National Convention of Progressive Patriots–Social Democratic Party, the Party for Democracy and Rally, the Movement for Socialist Democracy, the Union of Social Democrats, the Group of Revolutionary Democrats, the Rally of Social-Democrat Independents, the Party for Panafricanism and Unity, the Union of Democrats and Patriots of Burkina and the Party of Action for the Liberalism in Solidarity), as well as factions of the Group of Patriotic Democrats and the Burkinabé Socialist Bloc.

From 1992, when the office of Prime Minister was reestablished, until Blaise Compaoré was ousted in 2014, all Prime Ministers of Burkina Faso were members of the CDP, along with most other national officials, and the party held the most seats in Parliament.

In the parliamentary election held on 5 May 2002, the party won 49.5% of the popular vote and 57 out of 111 seats.

In the 13 November 2005 presidential election, the CDP candidate, President Compaoré, won 80.35% of the popular vote. At the May 2007 parliamentary election, the party expanded its majority, winning 73 seats.

In 2012, Assimi Kouanda was elected as the CDP's National Executive Secretary.

The party still had representation in parliament after the overthrow of Compaoré in October 2014, as well as following the November 2015 general elections.

The CDP held its sixth ordinary congress in Ouagadougou on 9–10 May 2015. Eddie Komboïgo, a businessman who had been a Deputy in the National Assembly prior to its 2014 dissolution, was elected as President of the CDP, while Compaoré was designated as Honorary President. On 11 July 2015, Komboïgo was designated as the CDP's candidate for the October 2015 presidential election. Komboïgo was subsequently barred from standing, and the CDP had no presidential candidate; however, it won 18 out of 127 seats in the concurrent parliamentary election. Meanwhile, party leaders were accused of involvement in the failed September 2015 coup, leading to the arrest of Komboïgo as well as a party vice-president, Léonce Koné. Together with various other opposition parties, the CDP formed the Coalition for Democracy and National Reconciliation on 16 October 2016; seeking to promote political reconciliation, it was mostly composed of forces that had backed Compaoré. The coalition stood in opposition to President Roch Marc Christian Kaboré and the ruling People's Movement for Progress (MPP), but it was distinct from the main opposition coalition, the Coalition of Democratic Forces for Real Change led by Zéphirin Diabré.

On 19 April 2017, the CDP criticized the forthcoming trial of Compaoré (in absentia) and members of his government in connection with efforts to suppress the October 2014 protests that led to the fall of the government. According to the CDP, the trial was a politically motivated "witch hunt" and "a clear violation of the rule of law".

On 29 January 2026, all parties, including this one, were dissolved through decree by the junta government in Burkina Faso.

== Electoral history ==
=== Presidential elections ===
Election	Party candidate	Votes	%	Result
1998	Blaise Compaoré	1,996,151	87.5%	Elected ✓
2005	Blaise Compaoré	1,660,148	80.35%	Elected ✓
2010	Blaise Compaoré	1,358,941	80.2%	Elected ✓
2020	Eddie Komboïgo	442,742	15.48%	Lost ✗

=== National Assembly elections ===
Election	Party leader	Votes	%	Seats	+/–	Position	Result
1997	Blaise Compaoré	1,449,082	68.6%	101 / 111	▲8	▲1st	Supermajority government
2002	Blaise Compaoré	862,119	49.52%	57 / 111	▼44	1st	Majority government
2007	Blaise Compaoré	1,373,078	58.85%	73 / 111	▲16	1st	Supermajority government
2012	Blaise Compaoré	1,467,749	48.66%	70 / 127	▼3	1st	Majority government
2015	Eddie Komboïgo	417,058	13.20%	18 / 127	▼52	▼3rd	Opposition
2020	Eddie Komboïgo	371,633	13.27%	20 / 127	▲2	▲2nd	Opposition
