= Soumane Touré =

Burkinabé politician (1948–2021)

Member of the National Assembly
- In office 5 May 2002 – June 2011

Personal details
- Born: 14 March 1948 Diébougou, French Upper Volta
- Died: 25 March 2021 (aged 73) Ouagadougou, Burkina Faso
- Party: Party of Independence, Labour and Justice
- Other political affiliations: African Independence Party; African Independence Party (Touré); Popular Front
- Occupation: Politician, trade unionist

Soumane Touré (14 March 1948 – 25 March 2021) was a Burkinabé politician and trade unionist. He was a prominent student activist during his youth and joined the communist African Independence Party (PAI). He served as the general secretary of the Burkinabé Trade Union Confederation (CSB) for many years and was a prominent leader of the Patriotic League for Development (LIPAD) mass movement. He was arrested on several occasions by different governments and even sentenced to death in 1987, only escaping execution through an intervention by then president Thomas Sankara. He was elected to the National Assembly in 2002 and ran for president in 2005.

== Early life and education ==
Touré was born on 14 March 1948 in Diébougou (Bougouriba Province, then in French Upper Volta). He attended high school at Lycée moderne in Bobo-Dioulasso, where he led a student protest movement against poor school management, poor living conditions and shortages of food for students.

After completing his high school studies, he moved to Dakar to attend university. He was active in the student movement there, particularly the Voltaic Scholarly Association (ASV). In Dakar he joined the African Independence Party (PAI). Touré recruited Valère Somé, who hailed from the same village, into PAI in Dakar.

After obtaining a law degree from the University of Dakar, Touré moved to France where he would specialize in insurance studies, becoming one of the first Voltan insurance specialists. He took part in the organization of the General Union of Voltan Students (UGEV) congress in Ouagadougou in 1971, at which he served as a rapporteur.

== Return to Upper Volta ==
Returning home to Upper Volta, Touré became a career insurance employee. He began working as a technical inspector at the Societe National d'Assurance et de Reassurance (SONAR) in 1974. On a number of occasions he was offered the post as director-general of SONAR, but Touré declined to remain active in trade union leadership. Touré took part in the founding of the Voltan Trade Union Confederation (CSV, later the Burkinabe Trade Union Confederation – CSB). Touré frequently met with the young military officer Thomas Sankara, who was emerging as a leading figure among radical military officers. African studies researcher Ernest Harsch writes that Touré was a childhood friend of Sankara, while his contemporary Brian J. Peterson writes that the contact between Sankara and Touré was mediated via Blaise Compaoré, who had befriended Touré in Yaoundé.

PAI leader Amirou Thiombiano unexpectedly died in 1975. Adama Touré, who had kinship relations with Soumane Touré, took over the party leadership and inducted Soumane Touré in the PAI Executive Committee.

== Mass leader ==
Touré emerged as a prominent mass movement leader, and was noted for being a powerful orator at rallies and meetings. He served as the general secretary of the Trade Union Federation of Banks, Insurance, Commerce and Industry (FESBACI). He became the general secretary of the CSV in 1976. Touré was a prominent figure in the Patriotic League for Development (LIPAD) protest movement during the 1978–1980 period. He was frequently arrested and often had to operate underground to avoid arrest. Touré was the chairman of the Ouagadougou section of LIPAD.

In December 1981, the CSV called a general strike against the "fascist military dictatorship" and Touré demonstratively resigned from the commission appointed by the CMPRN military junta to investigate the assets of officials. In response, the CMPRN military junta declared the CSV dissolved and ordered the arrest of Touré, who consequently went into hiding. Touré was eventually arrested during the night of 9–10 August 1982, in Léo. The trade union movement protested against his arrest. After the 7 November 1982, coup, the Popular Salvation Council (CSP) military junta released Touré from jail and legalized the CSV.

Touré organized student protests following the May 1983 detention of Sankara. Touré was subsequently arrested and jailed on 21 May 1983. Touré was thus in jail during the 4 August 1983 revolution. He was released from jail after Sankara took power.

== Revolutionary period ==
Following the victory of the 4 August 1983 revolution, LIPAS presented Touré as a candidate to serve as the general secretary of the Committees for the Defense of the Revolution (CDR), but the young captain Pierre Ouédraogo was chosen instead. In May 1984, as relations between LIPAD and the governing National Revolutionary Council (CNR) junta broke down, Touré was dismissed from public service.

Touré was arrested again in January 1985. On 10 January 1985, a Popular Revolutionary Tribunal cleared him of charges of being involved in a 298 million-CFA franc national social security fraud scheme. However, he was immediately sent back to jail on a defamation charge brought against him by the CNR, regarding statements made by him during his trial where he had accused the incumbent military junta of embezzling "billions" of CFA francs as compared with the "millions" stolen by previous governments. The CNR released Touré from jail on 2 October 1986.

In May 1987, Touré was jailed once more. On 26 May 1987, Touré had made statements condemning repression of the trade union movement and rejected government interference in the unions. On 30 May 1987, the CDR of Ouagadougou arrested Touré, accusing him of joining forces with counter-revolutionary elements. An extraordinary CDR session held 31 May – 1 June 1987, found him guilty and sentenced him to death. Compaoré convened the CNR Politburo and called for the arrest of other PAI leaders. The CDR raided trade union offices and arrested union leaders across the country. Sankara called a meeting of the CNR Central Committee, at which the Revolutionary Military Organization (OMR), the Union of Burkinabè Communists (UCB) and the Burkinabé Communist Group (GCB) spoke in favour of Touré's death penalty, while Sankara and the Union of Communist Struggles – Reconstructed (ULCR) opposed the measure. While Touré's verdict was not overturned, his execution was halted through the intervention of Sankara. According to the contemporary Burkinabé politician Valère Somé, many UCB leaders and several captains, such as GCB leader Jean-Pierre Palm, actively pushed for Touré's execution at the meeting.

== Compaoré years ==
Touré was later involved in the Popular Front, after the October 1987 coup which overthrew Sankara. Touré was again arrested in September 1989, after the CSB had protested against Popular Front interference in the trade union movement. Touré was a leading figure in the 1991 Alliance for the Respect and Defense of the Constitution (ARDC), a pro-government alliance of 27 parties.

Touré went into early retirement from his role at SONAR in 2000.

In 1999 PAI split in two, with Touré leading one of the two PAI parties and Philippe Ouédraogo leading the other PAI party. A lengthy dispute between Touré and Ouédraogo over the right to the party name "PAI" ensued. Touré's PAI won five seats in the 2002 National Assembly election. Touré himself was one of the elected parliamentarians, and he would become a member of Committee on Finance and Budget of the National Assembly. The elected PAI deputies sat in the parliamentary group of the Convention of Republican Forces, which was dominated by the governing Congress for Democracy and Progress (CDP).

In September 2005, Touré declared his candidacy for the 2005 Burkinabé presidential election. At this point PAI's alliance with the CDP was broken and the two PAI ministers had left the government. Ouédraogo lodged a complaint to the Constitutional Council over Touré's candidature, arguing that Touré's party had not been properly recognized. Touré, standing as the PAI candidate, obtained 23,266 votes (1.13%).

Touré's PAI lost its registration in June 2011, as a result of the protracted administrative-political dispute over the right to the PAI party name after the 1999 split. Touré founded the Party of Independence, Labour and Justice (PITJ) in July 2011, and served as general secretary of the party.

== Death ==
Touré died at a private clinic in central Ouagadougou on 25 March 2021. Paying condolences, President Roch Marc Christian Kaboré stated that Touré was "a patriot whose commitment and union and political struggle were in the service of his country and the Burkinabè people". The Prime Minister Christophe Joseph Marie Dabiré stated that "[a] library of our country's political history has been closed forever! ... Mr. Soumane Touré was a great fighter who was fully involved in politics and trade unionism for several decades, thus contributing to the construction and building of Burkinabe democracy." Opposition leader Eddie Komboïgo, chairman of the CDP, also paid tribute to Touré. Touré's body was taken from the morgue at the Sector 30 Hospital to his family home in Wemtenga, Ouagadougou, on 27 March 2021. He was buried in Diébougou on 28 March 2021.
