= Ecology in Thomas Sankara's policies =

Guidelines of President of Burkina Faso

Between 1983 and 1987, Thomas Sankara was at the head of the government of Burkina Faso. During this time, he put in place policies aiming at protecting the biodiversity and promoting self-sufficiency of Burkina Faso, while also advocating for a greater protection of the environment in the world. This was deeply influenced by his view of ecology as a way for Burkina Faso to achieve complete independence. His reforms created tensions among the population, and ultimately contributed to the 1987 coup d'Etat in Burkina Faso.

== Ideological background behind Thomas Sankara’s policies ==
Thomas Sankara, who came into power in 1983, was from a Marxist background. He also studied agricultural sciences at the military academy of Antsirabe (Madagascar). He mixed those two different backgrounds in his approach to agricultural and ecological policies.

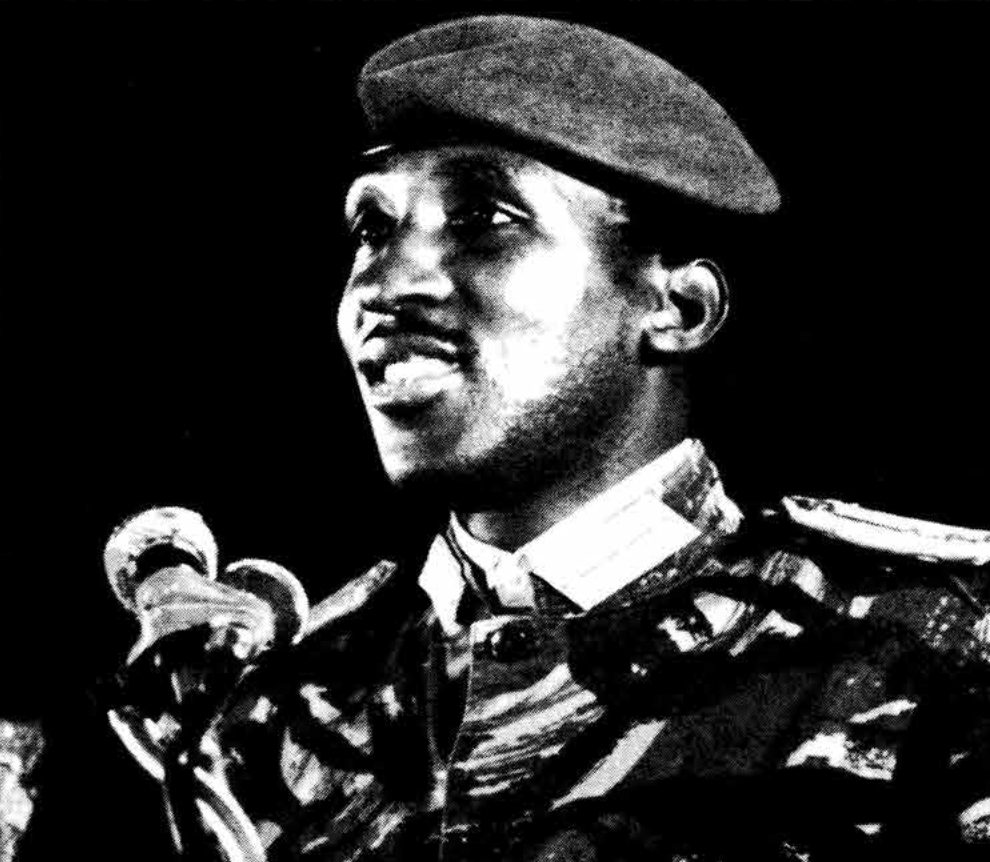
Thomas Sankara in Harlem, New York, 1984

Sankara adopted the Marxist view of sustainability: for a newly decolonized country, the struggle against colonialism and any attempt of neo-colonialism comes through a self-sufficient agriculture. Because food is one of the most important resources for a population, to have control over it is to be independent, and should therefore be a priority. That is why Sankara rejected most food aids in 1986. The same mindset led him to fight against multinationals: he believed that the pesticides they sold and the general structure of the international agriculture market alienated African countries and made them dependent on those multinationals.

Sankara’s addition to this marxist view of agriculture is to link it to ecology: he promoted a sustainable exploitation of the environment to ensure its viability. This would enable the country to stay self-sufficient and independent in the long run.

More specifically, Sankara’s ecological policies were rooted in his view of the revolution as an increase in the population’s happiness. Agroecological reforms were aimed at increasing food production to provide healthy food for the Burkinabè population.

The agenda pushed by Sankara was a project that aimed at transforming the society in its entirety, addressing large issues such as gender, education, food, health or housing. Therefore, his ecological policies are to be understood in this broader context. They all were influenced by this marxist comprehension of the world from a perspective of decolonial ecology, which links decolonization, ecology and food security.

== Policies put in place ==
=== Structure for the implementation of the policies ===
Sankara’s policies were implemented through a mixture of both bottom-up and top-down initiatives. In order for people to mobilize and to truly integrate the reforms, they needed to be included in the direction of the operations. Therefore, even though the global orientations were decided by the National Council for the Revolution (CNR), Sankara’s ecological policies relied heavily on the CDRs (Committees for the Defense of the Revolution). The CNR was the ruling organism of Burkina Faso, and is sometimes used to designate the entire regime, while CDRs were the local entities of the CNR.

At the local level, CDRs encouraged initiatives from civilians. Rural communities were encouraged to develop, among other things, water reservoirs and tree plantations. Those local initiatives were coordinated through a national campaign in 1984: the People’s Development Programme, which led to the construction of 274 water reservoirs. However, citizens were not individually involved, and the structure of the reforms quickly became solely shaped by the government. Everything was ultimately channeled by the CNR through the CDRs. Chiefs’ authority was weakened, and they were excluded from the official chain of command of the agroecological reforms.

=== Self-sufficiency and reduction of imported food ===
The first policies introduced by the Sankara regime illustrated the intersection between his decolonial and ecological convictions. His goal was to make Burkina Faso self-sufficient so that it would not depend on other countries and be truly independent. He also wanted Burkinabè people to consume fresh food rather than imported crops. The private sector was therefore excluded from the grain market, which was transferred to a government program that distributed crops locally.

Besides, in order to encourage people to produce and consume healthy food directly from Burkina Faso, Sankara banned fruit and vegetable imports. This measure aimed at developing agriculture in Burkina Faso, and providing food that had not travelled from other countries, thus impacting the planet.

In Sankara’s policies, agroecology and independence were merged: it was not only a measure of well-being for the population, but also of political survival for the country. In order to achieve self-sufficiency and to develop agriculture without relying on the multinationals he had rejected, Sankara developed a sustainable view of agriculture: he wanted to protect the soil in order to exploit it.

=== Fight against deforestation ===
Reforestation became one of the priorities of Sankara’s policies. In 1985, in a famous speech, he declared that planting trees would become mandatory for people who lived in Burkina Faso. Social aids were conditioned to the planting of a tree, while people were encouraged to plant as many trees as possible. Therefore, planting trees became a recurrent ceremony in people’s lives: after a wedding, a christening, or the visit of a personality, people would receive a tree to be planted. Sankara himself participated in this reforestation by planting trees at major events. In fifteen months, around 10 million trees are planted in Burkina Faso.

Even though this project was not accomplished while Sankara was in power, he had proposed to plant a large zone of trees throughout all the country, a vegetal barrier that could then be extended to other Sahelian countries.

=== Education on environmental issues ===
Alongside policies directly modifying the environment, Sankara advocated for a better understanding of environmental issues from a young age. While promoting schooling and education, he integrated ecology into the official programs: for instance, children in Ouagadougou had to create improved fireplaces. The latest aimed at reducing cutting of wood as well as fuel usage. This education in the schools was accompanied by programs of sensibilization to the use of gas.

Sankara was also one of the first leaders worldwide to frame ecology as a necessity for the future generations. That is why he made education one of the pillars of the transmission of the ecological policies.

This educational approach was coupled with a coercive vision: in order to fight against the “three struggles”, Sankara criminalized the abusive cutting of wood, intentional bush fires, and animals wandering.

=== International influence ===
Sankara also helped raise awareness at the institutional and international levels. He created the French Ministry for the Environment, at the head of which, loyal to his marxist views, he appointed a woman, Béatrice Damiba.

Sankara became a spokesperson for decolonial ecology: in the Paris Conference of 1986, he denounced the colonial pillage of African forests by the colonial powers, and asked for a general awareness about the direct consequences of the human actions. In order to call to leaders’ minds the gap between budgets allocated to spatial research and environmental research, he asked for 1% of the spatial budget to be distributed to environmental policies.

== Rising tensions and coup ==
Sankara radically transformed the agricultural sector through his agroecological policies, which led to rising tensions with several parts of the society. The centralization of decision-making and the impossibility of criticizing the reforms led to a growing discontent among citizens and eventually laid favorable ground for the coup of 1987. To accelerate the reforms, CDRs used coercion and intimidation, and repression increased the hostile sentiment towards the party’s excesses. Unions and chiefs, who had been deposed of their power by the CDRs, criticized the economic drawbacks of the agrarian change. They were joined by urban workers, who felt they were disadvantaged by what they saw as an excessive spending on rural areas.

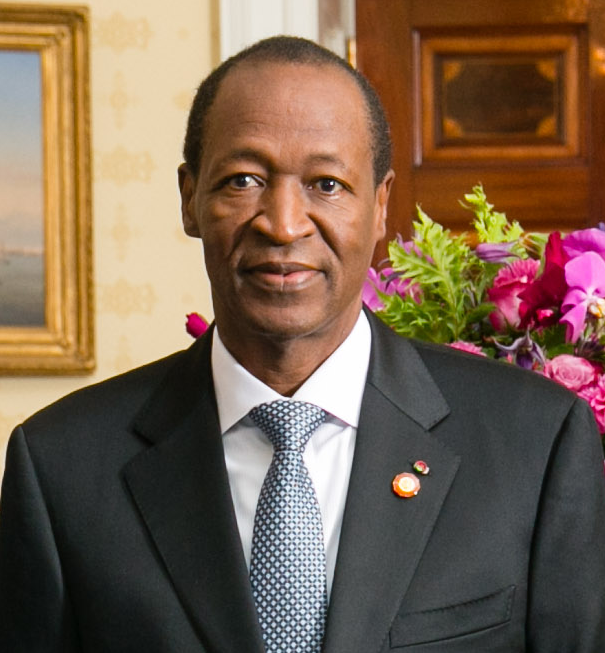
Blaise Compaoré in 2014

Ultimately, on October 15, 1987, Blaise Compaoré, a former ally of Thomas Sankara, overthrew his government. The agroecological policies were abandoned for an approach focusing on exportation and the adoption of structural adjustment policies that Sankara had previously refused. The agroecological policies launched by Sankara were not the only reason for his overthrowing, but they fostered resentment that facilitated it.

== Legacy of Thomas Sankara’s ecological policies ==
=== In the official policies ===
After Blaise Compaoré’s coup of 1987, Burkina Faso’s policies shifted to a more liberal orientation. Not only did agribusiness become the prominent model of agriculture, but genetically modified organisms, especially Bt cotton, were introduced in the country.

After two radical shifts (towards agroecology then away from it), the current Burkinabè agriculture is going under incremental changes to incorporate agroecology in a liberal agriculture. Sankara’s legacy is still carried out, even though it had been stopped during the Compaoré regime.

His radical methods were revived by the arrival of Ibrahim Traoré in power in 2022: as a young charismatic leader, Traoré is seen as a new Sankara. He uses the same narrative of complete independence: nationalization of the land, cutting ties with the French government, emphasis on food sovereignty, rejection of Western structures and loans, and promotion of local production are all themes that Sankara elaborated on. Even though Traoré does not directly claim Sankara’s legacy on environmental policies, he is using the same methods.

=== In the Burkinabè culture ===
The tradition of planting trees for any major occasion is still carried out today: in 2025, the seventh edition of National Tree Day invited Burkinabè people to plant 5 million trees in one hour. Most major events are still accompanied by the planting of a tree, symbolizing the living legacy of Sankara’s policies.

Individual initiatives are also carrying out Sankara’s legacy. This is especially the case of Blandine Sankara, the little sister of Thomas Sankara. She founded Yelemani, an organization that promotes food sovereignty and organic agriculture in Burkina Faso, and goes from school to school to educate children about ecological issues.

More generally, since the departure of Blaise Compaoré in 2014, Thomas Sankara’s figure has been more and more mobilized in the political debate, in particular among the youth. His precocity in addressing issues that are salient today (gender, environment, social struggles) makes an example of him for most of the younger generation. Rappeur Smockey, founder of Balai Citoyen, cited him as an example.

=== On the international stage ===
Map of the Great Green Wall in Sahel

Sankara’s ideas have had echoes beyond the borders of Burkina Faso. Created in 2005, the Great Green Wall project aims to strengthen the ecosystems of the Sahel region by reforesting the entire area. It is deeply influenced by the project of tree barrier against the desert launched by Sankara in Burkina Faso.
