= Chantal Compaoré =

Former first lady of Burkina Faso

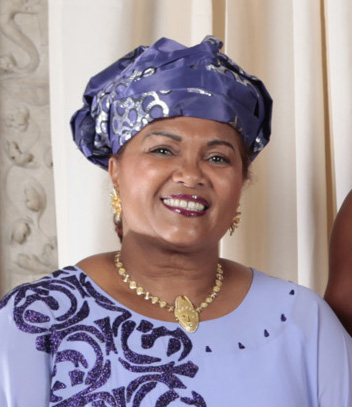

First Lady of Burkina Faso
- In role 15 October 1987 – 31 October 2014
- President: Blaise Compaoré
- Preceded by: Mariam Sankara
- Succeeded by: Marie Kafando

Personal details
- Born: 1962 (age 63–64) Dabou, Ivory Coast
- Spouse: Blaise Compaoré (m. 1985)

Chantal Compaoré (née Terrasson de Fougères; born 1962) is the Franco-Ivorian wife of former President Blaise Compaoré of Burkina Faso. Born and raised in the Dabou, Ivory Coast, after their marriage, she became the First Lady in 1987. She spent much of her time on charity work in Burkina Faso.

Her husband, who came to power in a bloody 1987 military coup, was overthrown in turn in the 2014 Burkinabé uprising. Chantal Compaoré was subsequently forced to flee to her home country, going into exile with her husband.

== Biography ==
=== Early life ===
Chantal Compaoré was born Chantal Terrasson de Fougères, in the Ivory Coast. Her parents were Simone Vicens, who had roots in French Upper Volta (current Burkina Faso) and Dr. Jean Terrasson Kourouma. He was the natural or extramarital son of French colonial administrator Jean Henri Terrasson de Fougères, who served for many years as Governor of French Sudan. Her family were closely related to that of Félix Houphouët-Boigny, the country's first President from 1960 until his death in 1993. He maintained policies of strong anti-communism and close relations with the former colonial power France, leading Ivory Coast as a single-party state. Some sources have suggested that Chantal was the daughter of Houphouët-Boigny, who was known to have fathered a child out of wedlock in 1961.

She met Captain Blaise Compaoré, at the time serving as Minister of State for Justice of Burkina Faso, on 15 January 1985, when the young military officer visited the Ivorian capital Abidjan and President Houphouët-Boigny. Compaoré had been a part of the Burkinabé government for one and a half years, since he launched a military coup against Jean-Baptiste Ouedraogo in what was then the Republic of Upper Volta on 4 August 1983 together with other members of the "Communist Officer's Group". After the coup he put his close friend Captain Thomas Sankara in the position of President. The two had previously been involved in the 1980 coup against Saye Zerbo.

Blaise and Chantal married on 29 June 1985, five months after first meeting. According to most sources, the marriage had been arranged in one way or another by President Houphouët-Boigny, who wanted an ally within the revolutionary left-wing government of Burkina Faso, with which he frequently clashed at the time. According to Dr. Valère Somé, one-time Minister of Higher Education and Research and a prominent ideologue of Sankara's "Democratic and Popular Revolution", Chantal Compaoré clashed with the President. She once publicly referred to his "pretend revolution" during a dinner party after he refused to accept champagne from her.

=== First Lady ===
On 15 October 1987, after growing tensions between the two men, Blaise Compaore orchestrated a military coup in which Thomas Sankara and twelve aides were gunned down. President Félix Houphouët-Boigny was deeply involved in the coup, and there was possible French involvement. Blaise took the position of President, making Chantal the First Lady of Burkina Faso. Her predecessor, Mariam Sankara, fled the country with her two sons. President Compaoré would soon retract most of the many reforms made by Sankara.

Not long afterwards, Désirée "Daisy" Delafosse – the widow of Adolphus Tolbert, "foster-sister" of Chantal and god-daughter of President Houphouët-Boigny – arrived in Burkina Faso. Her late husband was the son of President William R. Tolbert, Jr. of Liberia and had been murdered in 1980 by the forces of Samuel Doe, who killed the older Tolbert in a coup. Her presence in the presidential entourage, and the close connections between Houphouët-Boigny and the Compaorés, was a contributing factor in the very cold Liberian-Burkinabé relations during the following years. In addition, Burkina Faso used its military in the First Liberian Civil War, on the side of Blaise's close friend Charles Taylor.

Blaise Compaoré ultimately held the Burkinabé presidency for 27 years, gradually transitioning it from a military dictatorship to a multi-party state. It was rated as an "authoritarian regime" in 2012 by the Democracy Index, based on restricted political freedoms, political corruption, and cases of state-sponsored violence, among other aspects. Burkina Faso remained one of the poorest and most undeveloped countries in the world.

First Lady Chantal Compaoré spent much of her husband's presidency engaging in charity, domestically and abroad. For example, she founded the Burkina Association for the Protection of Children in 1989, later renamed the Suka Foundation in 1997, which works primarily with aiding children through healthcare, housing and education improvements. In 2002 her foundation and that of Chantal Biya, First Lady of Cameroon, joined in a campaign to halt the spread of HIV/AIDS.

First Lady Compaoré also travelled extensively abroad, sometimes together with the President on official diplomatic state visits, such as visiting the White House and meeting with U.S. President Barack Obama and First Lady Michelle Obama in August 2014. She also wrote extensively on human development issues, for example publishing a 2009 editorial in The Guardian, praising President Hosni Mubarak of Egypt and President Yoweri Museveni of Uganda for their opposition to female genital mutilation and calling for more work to be done against the practice in Africa.

=== Exile ===
During his presidency, Blaise Compaoré faced many challenges from an increasingly dissatisfied and tense population. During the 2011 Burkinabé protests, there were several months of army mutinies, street protests, labour strikes, arson attacks, and so on. Blaise Compaoré briefly fled the capital of Ouagadougou, taking shelter in his hometown Ziniaré; it is unknown if his wife followed him there. The protests were quelled by a combination of force, but marked a turning point in the decade-long Compoaré regime.

On 28 October 2014, after President Compaoré tried to lift the constitutional limit on his presidential terms ahead of the coming election in 2014, the 2014 Burkinabé uprising broke out. Mass protests erupted once more, partially inspired by the memory of Thomas Sankara, with the military eventually deciding to take charge of the situation. On 31 October 2014 Blaise Compaoré resigned his presidency, and he and Chantal fled the country. Initially it was reported that the former president had fled to Senegal, but that proved false. It was then reported that a heavily armed convoy believed to be carrying Compaoré was traveling towards the southern town of Pô, where he had started the 1983 military coup. However, it diverted before reaching the town, and he fled to Ivory Coast with the support of President Alassane Ouattara.

Soon after the couple's arrival, Radio France Internationale managed to arrange a first interview with Chantal Compaoré, held during a secret meeting. The now former First Lady had arrived in Yamoussoukro before her husband, and had initially waited for him at Korhogo near the Burkinabé-Ivorian border.

The couple faced an uncertain future. Many in Burkina Faso – among them the widowed Mariam Sankara, who had returned from exile in 2007, – called for Blaise to be prosecuted.

== See also ==
- History of Burkina Faso
- History of Ivory Coast
- 2014 Burkinabé uprising
