= Adama Touré =

Adama Touré may refer to:

- Adama Touré (PAI general secretary) (1936–2012), Burkinabé politician and educator
- Adama Touré (footballer) (born 1991), Malian football player
- Adama Touré (SONABEL trade unionist), Burkinabé trade unionist
