= Adama Touré (SONABEL trade unionist) =

Burkinabé trade unionist

Adama Touré was a Burkinabé trade unionist. He worked as an agent at Société Nationale d'électricité du Burkina Faso (SONABEL). As of the 1980s, he was the Secretary of the Trade Union of Technicians and Workers of Burkina (STOB, Syndicat des travailleurs et ouvriers du Burkina) and Secretary for External Relations for the Burkinabé Trade Union Confederation (CSB). He was a leader of the Patriotic League for Development (LIPAD) and a member of the Central Executive Bureau of the African Independence Party (PAI).

After the rift between LIPAD and the militaries in August 1984, Toure was dismissed from public service for 'defamation of the CNR' (National Revolutionary Council). In October 1984 Toure was arrested. He was released from detention on 3 February 1986, along with the PAI general secretary Adama Touré.

He was arrested on 1 June 1987, as the CNR was cracking down on LIPAD-PAI.

He was the younger brother of CSB leader Soumane Touré.
