= Adama Touré (PAI general secretary) =

Burkinabé politician (1936–2012)

- Born: Adama Abdoulaye Touré; 1936; Kampti, Poni Province, French West Africa
- Died: 26 October 2012 (aged 75–76)
- Other name: Lénine
- Occupation: Politician
- Political party: African Independence Party

Adama Abdoulaye Touré (1936 – 26 October 2012) was a Burkinabé politician. Touré was a radical student activist and became a leading member of the communist African Independence Party (PAI), and would become the leader of the party in Burkina Faso. He was a teacher at a military academy and played a significant role in forming the ideological outlook of military leaders who would govern the country after the 1983 revolution. He served as Minister of Information in the revolutionary government 1983–1984, but was imprisoned after the split between PAI and the military. He was known by the nickname "Lénine".

== Youth ==
Touré was born in 1936 in Kampti (today in Poni Province, then in Ivory Coast, French West Africa). He attended primary school from 1944 to 1950. He studied the Modern Colleges of Bobo-Dioulasso and Ouagadougou from 1951 to 1959, and obtained a baccalaureate degree. He was elected as the representative of the pupils at the Modern College of Bobo-Dioulasso in 1953. In 1956, he became the president of the Kampti Pupils Fraternal Union (UEFK). He would also be elected as the representative of the pupils at Modern College of Ouagadougou.

== Senegal years ==
In 1959, he enrolled in the University of Dakar. He was the chairman of the Voltan Scholarly Association (ASV) of Dakar from 1961 to 1965. He later served as secretary of the Voltan section of the General Students Union of West Africa (UGEAO) from 1962 to 1966. As an UGEAO student activist, he joined the African Independence Party (PAI) in May 1962.

He obtained a degree in history and geography, as well as a Diploma of Higher Studies on the resistance to the recruitment of Upper Voltan riflemen during World War I. He worked as a history and geography teacher at the Ecole Normale des Jeunes Filles in Thiès from 1966 to 1967.

== Return to Upper Volta ==
In 1967, he returned to Upper Volta, and began teaching at the Preparatory Military School (today the PMK military school). In 1969 he was appointed as director of the Ecole Normal des Instituteurs et Institutrices de Ouagadougou. In 1971, PAI organized an anti-imperialist protest against the visit of Ivorian president Félix Houphouët-Boigny, after which Adama was dismissed from his teaching post. Later the same year, he returned to teaching at the PMK military school (where he would remain until 1981). He would serve as studies director at PMK. His style of teaching differed greatly from the French teachers that remained at the institution; he gave lectures on the events of the French, Russian, Algerian and Vietnamese revolutions and earned the nickname 'Lénine' from the students at PMK.

== Influence on Sankara ==
His students at the PMK military school included the young cadets Thomas Sankara and Blaise Compaoré. Touré later became Sankara's political mentor; per Bruno Jaffré, "[t]he one who opened the eyes of President Thomas Sankara to the class struggle was Adama Touré, nicknamed Lenin, teacher in history and geography, studies director at Prytanée militaire de Kadiogo (PMK) during President Sankara's time at the establishment". Brian J. Peterson stated that "[i]t's difficult to overstate the importance of Adama Toure in the political education of Sankara and his peers, who were still callow youth looking for direction. During the revolution, Sankara took his distance from Toure and downplayed his former teacher's influence in a bid to consolidate power. However, those who knew Sankara well during the PMK years agree that Toure had a tremendous influence on Sankara's intellectual formation".

== PAI leader ==
An activist in the National Union of African Teachers of Upper Volta (SNEAHV) and later the Voltan Unitary Trade Union of Secondary and Higher Education Teachers (SUVESS), Touré was a co-founder of the Voltan Trade Union Confederation (CSV) in September 1974.

In 1975, the PAI leader Amirou Thiombiano unexpectedly died. Adama Touré took over the post as the Upper Voltan PAI general secretary, and inducted Philippe Ouédraogo and his relative Soumane Touré into the PAI Executive Committee. Under Adama's leadership, as the liberation wars in Guinea-Bissau, Angola and Mozambique were winding down, PAI shifted its focus to domestic politics. PAI built mass movements, with the Patriotic League for Development (LIPAD) movement bringing the influence of the underground PAI out of the shadows. He remained in the post as general secretary of PAI until 1990.

After leaving the PMK military school, he served as Director of General Secondary Teaching, later Director of General and Technical Secondary Teaching from 1981 to 1983.

== Government minister and imprisonment ==
On 24 August 1983, he was named Minister of Information, being one of five LIPAD-PAI cabinet ministers in the new revolutionary government. During May–June 1984 Touré was on a tour of Europe, during which he spoke publicly on the tensions between LIPAD and the militaries in the government.

Touré was dismissed from the government in August 1984. He was detained in October 1984. In early November 1984 Touré was transferred to a Sûreté générale police post, where he met fellow PAI prisoners Hama Arba Diallo and his name-sake Adama Touré. He was released from detention on 3 February 1986, along with Adama Touré.

== Later years ==
He worked as the History and Geography Cell at the Burkina Pedagogical Institute between 1987 and 1989. He became the founding director of Lycée Privé de la Jeunesse in 1990. Touré died during the night between 26 and 27 October 2012.

The Adama Abdoulaye Touré Foundation for Science and Education (Fondation Abdoulaye Adama Touré pour la science et l'éducation) was established in 2014, in honour of Adama Touré.
