= Tout-à-Coup Jazz =

Late-1970s Upper Voltan jazz band

Tout-à-Coup Jazz was a musical group formed in the Republic of Upper Volta (today Burkina Faso) in the 1970s, during the military rule of Colonel General Sangoulé Lamizana. In French, tout à coup is an adverb meaning "suddenly" or "out of the blue". As the name indicates, the band played jazz, and is said to have been relatively popular. The band included Captain Thomas Sankara on guitar and his close friend, Captain Blaise Compaoré, on the microphone.

Sankara, a Marxist, pan-Africanist, and war veteran, met Blaise Compaoré in 1976 when they were stationed in Morocco. Sankara was taught guitar as a child by Pascal Ouédraogo Kayouré, who called him a "disciplined student" whose real passion was music. In 2015 Abdoulaye Cisse (who noted that Sankara was a skilled musician whereas "Compaoré just sang") stated that while the band had more rehearsals than concerts, every performance was magical. In 1983, Compaoré led a military coup against Major Jean-Baptiste Ouédraogo, placing his Sankara as President of Upper Volta.

Sankara incorporated his musical experiences into the radical transformation of Voltaic society which he attempted, dubbed the "Democratic and Popular Revolution" (French: Révolution démocratique et populaire). He often entertained official guests by playing the guitar, and during a massive campaign to vaccinate rural children he played in the field. At least once during his time as president, he reunited the band with Compaoré in a surprise appearance, playing in front of an audience. Sankara also wrote an anthem for the renamed Burkina Faso, One Sole Night (French: Une Seule Nuit). Not only focusing on his own music, he sponsored domestic musicians and hosted foreign ones, among them Fela Kuti, a left-wing Nigerian musician who pioneered Afrobeat, a combination of traditional African music, funk, highlife, and jazz. Affected by Sankara's death, he wrote "Underground System" as a musical tribute to the only African leader to embrace him and his music. It was a hit when released in 1992.

On 15 October 1987, Sankara was killed in a military coup orchestrated by Blaise Compaoré, who succeeded him as President. Compaoré remained ruler of Burkina Faso for 27 years until he was forced to resign and flee the country following the 2014 Burkinabé uprising, an event largely inspired by Sankara's legacy.

== See also ==
- History of Burkina Faso
- Music of Burkina Faso
