= Thomas Sankara =

President of Burkina Faso from 1983 to 1987

Captain Thomas Sankara
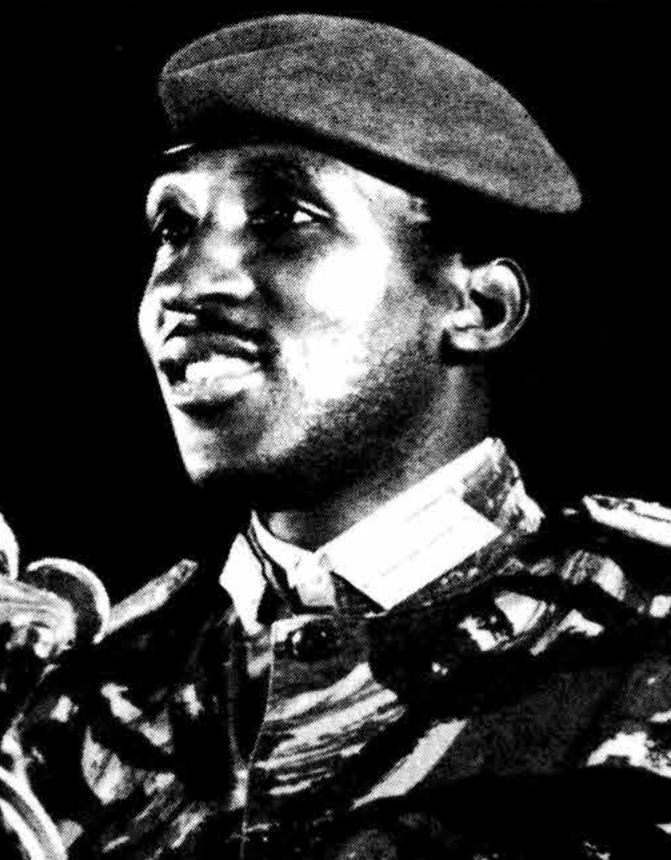
- Sankara speaking in Harlem, United States, in 1984

1st President of Burkina Faso
- In office 4 August 1983 – 15 October 1987
- Prime Minister: Vacant
- Preceded by: Jean-Baptiste Ouédraogo (as President of Upper Volta)
- Succeeded by: Blaise Compaoré

5th Prime Minister of Upper Volta
- In office 10 January 1983 – 17 May 1983
- President: Jean-Baptiste Ouédraogo
- Preceded by: Saye Zerbo
- Succeeded by: Post abolished

Secretary of State for Information
- In office 9 September 1981 – 21 April 1982

Personal details
- Born: Thomas Isidore Noël Sankara; 21 December 1949 Yako, Upper Volta, French West Africa
- Died: 15 October 1987 (aged 37) Ouagadougou, Kadiogo, Burkina Faso
- Cause of death: Assassination (gunshot wounds)
- Resting place: Thomas Sankara Mausoleum, Ouagadougou
- Spouse: Mariam Sankara
- Children: 2
- Education: Antsirabe Military Academy
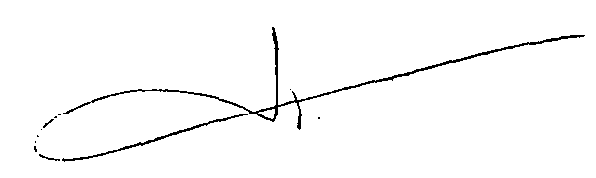
- Signature

Military service
- Allegiance: Republic of Upper Volta; Burkina Faso
- Years of service: 1966–1987
- Rank: Captain
- Battles/wars: 1982 Upper Voltan coup d'état 1983 Upper Voltan coup d'état Agacher Strip War; 1987 Burkina Faso coup d'état
- Sankara's voice Recorded 1984

Thomas Isidore Noël Sankara (Note: /toʊˈmɑː sɑːnˈkɑː.rɑː/, toh-MAH sahn-KAH-rah; French pronunciation: [tɔmɑ izidɔʁ nɔɛl sɑ̃kaʁa]) (21 December 1949 – 15 October 1987) was a Burkinabé military officer, politician, Marxist and pan-Africanist revolutionary who served as the first president of Burkina Faso from 1983 until his assassination in 1987. Sankara previously served as the fifth prime minister of Upper Volta from January to May 1983.

After Sankara was appointed Prime Minister of the Republic of Upper Volta in 1983, he disputed with the sitting government and was placed under house arrest, during which a group of revolutionaries seized power on his behalf in a popular coup later that year.

Following the coup, Sankara, then 33, became the President of the Republic of Upper Volta and launched an unprecedented series of social, ecological, and economic reforms that were part of what he referred to as the people's democratic revolution. In 1984, Sankara oversaw the renaming of the country as Burkina Faso ('land of the upright people'), and personally wrote its national anthem. His foreign policy centered on anti-imperialism and self-sufficiency, and he rejected loans and capital from such organizations as the International Monetary Fund. However, he welcomed some foreign aid in an effort to boost the domestic economy and diversify sources of assistance.

His domestic policies included famine prevention, agrarian expansion, land reform, and suspending rural poll taxes, as well as a nationwide literacy campaign and vaccination program to reduce meningitis, yellow fever and measles. Sankara's health programmes distributed millions of doses of vaccines to children across Burkina Faso. His government also focused on building schools, health centres, water reservoirs, and infrastructure projects. He combatted desertification of the Sahel by planting more than 10 million trees. Socially, his government enforced the prohibition of female circumcision, forced marriages, and polygamy. Sankara reinforced his populist image by ordering the sale of luxury vehicles and properties owned by the government in order to reduce costs, and refusing to use his office's air conditioning. He established Cuban-inspired Committees for the Defense of the Revolution purportedly to serve as a new foundation of society and promote popular mobilization. His Popular Revolutionary Tribunals prosecuted public officials charged with graft, political crimes and corruption, considering such elements of the state counter-revolutionaries. Amnesty International criticised his government for alleged human rights violations, such as arbitrary detentions of political opponents.

Sankara's revolutionary programmes and reforms for African self-reliance made him an icon to many of Africa's poverty-stricken nations, and the president remained popular with a substantial majority of his country's citizens, as well as those outside Burkina Faso. Some of his policies alienated elements of the former ruling class, including tribal leaders, and the governments of France and its ally, the Ivory Coast.

On 15 October 1987, Sankara was assassinated by troops led by Blaise Compaoré, who assumed leadership of the country shortly thereafter. Compaoré retained power until the 2014 Burkina Faso uprising. In 2021, he was formally charged by a military tribunal with the murder of Sankara and found guilty.

== Early life ==
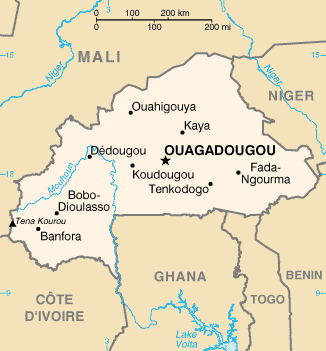
A map showing the major cities of Burkina Faso

Thomas Sankara was born Thomas Isidore Noël Sankara on 21 December 1949 in Yako, French Upper Volta, as the third of ten children to Joseph and Marguerite Sankara. His father, Joseph Sankara, a gendarme, was of Silmi–Mossi heritage, while his mother, Marguerite Kinda, was of direct Mossi descent. He spent his early years in Gaoua, a town in the humid southwest to which his father was transferred as an auxiliary gendarme. As the son of one of the few African functionaries then employed by the colonial state, he enjoyed a relatively privileged position. The family lived in a brick house with the families of other gendarmes at the top of a hill overlooking the rest of Gaoua.

Sankara attended primary school at Bobo-Dioulasso. He applied himself seriously to his schoolwork and excelled in mathematics and French. He went to church often and, impressed with his energy and eagerness to learn, some of the priests encouraged Thomas to go on to seminary school once he finished primary school. Despite initially agreeing, he instead took the exam required for entry to the sixth grade in the secular educational system and passed. Thomas's decision to continue with his education at the nearest lycée, Ouezzin Coulibaly (named after a pre-independence nationalist), proved to be a turning point. He left his father's household to attend the lycée in Bobo-Dioulasso, the country's commercial centre. There, Sankara made close friends, including Fidèle Too, whom he later named a minister in his government, and Soumane Touré, who was in a more advanced class.

His Roman Catholic parents wanted him to become a priest, but he chose to enter the military. The military was popular at the time, having just ousted Maurice Yaméogo, the first but unpopular president of the new republic.

Many young intellectuals viewed the military as a national institution that might potentially help to discipline the inefficient and corrupt bureaucracy, counterbalance the inordinate influence of traditional chiefs, and generally help modernize the country. Acceptance into the military academy was accompanied by a scholarship; Sankara could not easily afford the costs of further education otherwise. He took the entrance exam and passed.

He entered the military academy of Kadiogo in Ouagadougou with the academy's first intake of 1966 at the age of 17. While there he witnessed the first military coup d'état in Upper Volta, led by Lieutenant-Colonel Sangoulé Lamizana (3 January 1966). The trainee officers were taught by civilian professors in the social sciences. Adama Touré, who taught history and geography, was the academic director at the time and known for having progressive ideas, although he did not publicly share them.

He invited a few of his brightest and more political students, among them Sankara, to join informal discussions outside the classroom about imperialism, neocolonialism, socialism and communism, the Soviet and Chinese revolutions, the liberation movements in Africa, and similar topics. This was the first time Sankara was systematically exposed to a revolutionary perspective on Upper Volta and the world. Aside from his academic and extracurricular political activities, Sankara also pursued his passion for music, playing the guitar in a band called Tout-à-Coup Jazz.

In 1970, 20-year-old Sankara went for further military studies at the military academy of Antsirabe in Madagascar, from which he graduated as a junior officer in 1973. At the Antsirabe academy, the range of instruction went beyond standard military subjects, which allowed Sankara to study agriculture, including how to raise crop yields and better the lives of farmers. He took up these issues in his own administration and country. During that period, he read profusely on history and military strategy, thus acquiring the concepts and analytical tools that he would later use in his reinterpretation of Burkinabe political history. He was also influenced by French leftist professors in Madagascar. Their intellectual influence on him was later superseded by that of Samir Amin, whose concepts of auto-centered development and delinking from the global capitalist economy influenced him deeply (they were personal friends as well). Thomas Sankara's own speeches and works also show that his analytical strengths went beyond merely applying Cuban solutions or Amin's ideas. Beyond Marxism, he also drew from religious sources (both the Bible and the Quran were among his favourite readings). His focus on the peasantry, developed independently from both Amin and Mao Zedong, was especially important and influenced many in Burkina Faso and also later in other African countries.

== Military career ==
After his basic military training in secondary school in 1966, Sankara began his military career at the age of 19. A year later, he was sent to Madagascar for officer training at Antsirabe, where he witnessed popular uprisings in 1971 and 1972 against the government of Philibert Tsiranana. During this period, he first read the works of Karl Marx and Vladimir Lenin, which profoundly influenced his political views for the rest of his life.

Returning to Upper Volta in 1972, he fought in a border war between Upper Volta and Mali by 1974. He earned fame for his performance in the conflict, but years later would renounce the fighting as 'useless and unjust', a reflection of his growing political consciousness.

In 1976, he became commander of the Commando Training Centre in Pô. During the presidency of Colonel Saye Zerbo, a group of young officers formed a secret organization called ROC, the best-known members being Henri Zongo, Jean-Baptiste Boukary Lingani, Blaise Compaoré and Sankara.

== Government posts ==
Sankara was appointed Minister of Information in Saye Zerbo's military government in September 1981. Sankara differentiated himself from other government officials in many ways, such as biking to work every day, instead of driving in a car. While his predecessors would censor journalists and newspapers, Sankara encouraged investigative journalism and allowed the media to print whatever it found. This led to publications of government scandals by both privately owned and state-owned newspapers. He resigned on 12 April 1982 in opposition to what he saw as the regime's anti-labour drift, declaring 'Misfortune to those who gag the people!' (Malheur à ceux qui bâillonnent le peuple!).

After another coup (7 November 1982) brought to power Major-Doctor Jean-Baptiste Ouédraogo, Sankara became Prime Minister in January 1983. But he was dismissed a few months later, on 17 May. During those four months, Sankara pushed Ouédraogo's regime for more progressive reforms. Sankara was arrested after the French President's African affairs adviser, Guy Penne, met with Col. Yorian Somé. Henri Zongo and Jean-Baptiste Boukary Lingani were also placed under arrest. The decision to arrest Sankara proved to be very unpopular with the younger officers in the military regime. His imprisonment created enough momentum for his friend Blaise Compaoré to lead another coup.

== Presidency ==
A coup d'état organized by Blaise Compaoré made Sankara President on 4 August 1983 at the age of 33. The coup d'état was supported by Libya, which was at the time on the verge of war with France in Chad (see history of Chad).

Sankara identified as a revolutionary and was inspired by the examples of Cuba's Fidel Castro and Che Guevara, and Ghana's military leader Jerry Rawlings. As President, he promoted the 'Democratic and Popular Revolution' (Révolution démocratique et populaire, or RDP). The ideology of the Revolution was defined by Sankara as anti-imperialist in a speech on 2 October 1983, the Discours d'orientation politique (DOP), written by his close associate Valère Somé. His policy was oriented toward fighting corruption and promoting reforestation.

On 4 August 1984, the first anniversary of his accession, he renamed the country Burkina Faso, meaning 'the land of upright people' in Mooré and Dyula, the two major languages of the country. He also gave it a new flag, new coat of arms, and wrote a new national anthem (Ditanyè).

=== Council of the Revolution ===
When Sankara assumed power on 4 August, he named the leadership of the country the Council of the Revolution (CNR). This was a way for Sankara to signal that he was going to try for political and social change. The CNR was composed of both civilians and soldiers, all ordinary people. But the member count was secret for security reasons and known only to Sankara and others in his inner circle.

The CNR regularly met to talk about important plans and decisions for the country. They helped give advice and direction to the government's actions. They voted on suggestions and decisions from government officials; the decision-making was collective. On some occasions, they overruled even proposals favoured personally by Sankara.

=== Healthcare and public works ===
Sankara's first priorities after taking office were feeding, housing, and providing medical care to his people who desperately needed it. He launched a mass vaccination program aimed at eradicating polio, meningitis, and measles. From 1983 to 1985, two million Burkinabé were vaccinated, significantly improving public health outcomes.

Prior to Sankara's presidency, the infant mortality rate in Burkina Faso was about 20.8%. During his time in office, it fell to 14.5%. His administration was also the first African government to publicly recognize the AIDS epidemic as a major threat to Africa.

In addition to healthcare, Sankara focused on large-scale housing and infrastructure projects. He established brick factories to help build houses and reduce urban slums. This initiative provided affordable housing and created jobs, contributing to economic stability.

To combat deforestation, Sankara initiated "The People's Harvest of Forest Nurseries," supplying 7,000 village nurseries and organizing the planting of several million trees. This reforestation effort not only aimed to restore the environment but also to create sustainable agricultural practices. His administration connected all regions of the country through an extensive road and rail-building program. Over 700 km (430 mi) of rail was laid by Burkinabé people, facilitating manganese extraction in 'The Battle of the Rails,' without any foreign aid or outside money. These initiatives demonstrated his belief that African countries could achieve prosperity without foreign assistance.

Sankara also prioritized education to combat the country's 90% illiteracy rate. His administration implemented successful education programs, resulting in significant improvements in literacy. Before his assassination, teachers' strikes and the new regime's unwillingness to negotiate led to the creation of 'Revolutionary Teachers.' In 1986, nearly 2,500 teachers were fired due to a strike, prompting his government to invite anyone with a college degree to teach through the revolutionary teachers' program. Volunteers received a 10-day training course before starting to teach.

=== Trade ===
In terms of trade policy, Sankara favoured autarky, banning several items from being imported into Burkina Faso and encouraging import substitution industrialization. One example of this was cotton, where domestically produced fabric quickly came to be used exclusively. He also adopted this approach in relation to food crops, exhorting Burkinabes to consume locally grown food instead of rice and grain imported from Europe.

=== Agriculture ===
In the 1980s, more than 90% of the population were still subsistence farmers. Less than six percent of land that could be irrigated was receiving irrigation, while the rest relied on rain, which was highly unreliable and inadequate. Only 10% of the population had animals for plowing, whilst the rest relied on individual use of short hoes to plow. Few livestock herders had access to fodder; they had to roam the countryside in search of grazing land and watering spots. Because of this, hunger remained prevalent. In years of drought, the rural population was threatened by famines.

In Sankara's five-year plan, some 71% of projected investments for the productive sectors were allocated to agriculture, livestock, fishing, wildlife and forests. In three years, 25% more land was irrigated because of volunteer projects. In Sourou Valley, a dam was built within a few months, almost entirely by volunteer labour. The use of fertilizers increased by 56%. Hundreds of tractors were bought and imported for large-scale cooperative projects.

Hundreds of village cereal banks were built through collective labour organised by the CDRs to help farmers store and market their crops. In the past, farmers would have no way to store surplus grains and had to sell them to local merchants, who would sell the same crops back to the same village for twice the cost.

In August 1984, all land was nationalized. Previously, local chiefs had decided who could farm. In some areas, private land ownership had begun to arise. The total cereal production rose by 75% between 1983 and 1986. In four years, UN-analysts declared Burkinian agriculture as productive enough to be "food self-sufficient".

=== Environment ===
In the 1980s, when ecological awareness was still very low, Thomas Sankara was one of the few leaders to consider environmental protection a priority. He engaged in three major battles: against bush fires, 'which will be considered as crimes and will be punished as such'; against cattle roaming, 'which infringes on the rights of peoples because unattended animals destroy nature'; and against the chaotic cutting of firewood, 'whose profession will have to be organized and regulated'.

As part of a development program involving a large part of the population, ten million trees were planted in Burkina Faso in fifteen months during the revolution. To face the advancing desert and recurrent droughts, Thomas Sankara also proposed planting wooded strips of about fifty kilometers, crossing the country from east to west. He thought of extending this vegetation belt to other countries.

Beginning in October 1984, over the space of fifteen months, Sankara's government planted ten million trees in a campaign of reforestation. Sankara said, "In Burkina wood is our only source of energy. We have to constantly remind every individual of his duty to maintain and regenerate nature".

=== People's Revolutionary Tribunals ===
Shortly after attaining power, Sankara constructed a system of courts known as the Popular Revolutionary Tribunal. The courts were created originally to try former government officials in a straightforward way so the average Burkinabé could participate in or oversee trials of enemies of the revolution. They placed defendants on trial for corruption, tax evasion, or counter-revolutionary activity. Sentences for former government officials were light and often suspended. The tribunals have been alleged to have been only show trials, held very openly with oversight from the public.

According to the US State Department, procedures in these trials, especially legal protections for the accused, did not conform to international standards. Defendants had to prove themselves innocent of the crimes they were charged with committing and were not allowed to be represented by counsel. The courts were initially highly admired by the Burkinabé people but were eventually labeled corrupt and oppressive. So-called 'lazy workers' were tried and sentenced to work for free, or expelled from their jobs and discriminated against. Some created their own courts to settle scores and humiliate their enemies.

=== Revolutionary Defence Committees ===
The Committees for the Defense of the Revolution (Comités de Défense de la Révolution or CDRs) were formed as mass armed organizations. The CDRs were created as a counterweight to the power of the army as well as to promote political and social revolution. The idea for the Revolutionary Defence Committees was taken from Cuban leader Fidel Castro, whose Committees for the Defense of the Revolution had been created as a form of 'revolutionary vigilance'.

=== Relations with the Mossi people ===
A point of contention regarding Sankara's rule is the way he handled the Mossi ethnic group. The Mossi are the largest ethnic group in Burkina Faso, and they adhere to a strict, traditional, hierarchical social system. At the top of the hierarchy is the Morho Naba, the chief or king of the Mossi people. Sankara viewed this arrangement as an obstacle to national unity, and proceeded to demote the Mossi elite. The Morho Naba was not allowed to hold courts. Local village chiefs were stripped of their executive powers, which were given to the CDR.

=== Women's rights ===
Sankara had extensively worked for women's rights and declared "There is no true social revolution without the liberation of women".

Improving women's status in Burkinabé society was one of Sankara's explicit goals, and his government included a large number of women, an unprecedented policy priority in West Africa. His government banned female genital mutilation, forced marriages and polygamy, while appointing women to high governmental positions and encouraging them to work outside the home and stay in school even if pregnant. Sankara promoted contraception and in 1986 all restrictions on contraception were removed. He also established a Ministry of Family Development and the Union of Burkina Women.

Sankara recognized the challenges faced by African women when he gave his famous address to mark International Women's Day on 8 March 1987 in Ouagadougou. Sankara spoke to thousands of women, saying that the Burkinabé Revolution was 'establishing new social relations', which would be 'upsetting the relations of authority between men and women and forcing each to rethink the nature of both. This task is formidable but necessary'. In addition to being the first African leader to appoint women to major cabinet positions, he recruited them actively for the military.

=== Agacher Strip War ===
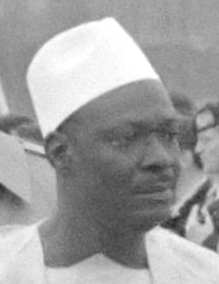
Moussa Traoré

Following the 1974 clashes between Burkina Faso and Mali over the disputed territory of the Agacher Strip, the Organisation of African Unity had created a mediation commission to resolve the disagreement and provide for an independent, neutral demarcation of the border. Both governments had declared that they would not use armed force to end the dispute.

But by 1983 the two countries disagreed about the work of the commission. Sankara personally disliked Malian President Moussa Traoré, who had taken power by deposing Modibo Keïta's left-leaning regime. On 17 September Sankara visited Mali and met with Traoré. With Algerian mediation, the two agreed to have the border dispute settled by the International Court of Justice (ICJ) and subsequently petitioned the body to resolve the issue.

In July 1985 Burkina Faso declared the Malian secretary general of the Economic Community of West Africa, Drissa Keita, a persona non grata after he criticized Sankara's regime. In September, Sankara delivered a speech in which he called for a revolution in Mali. Malian leaders were particularly sensitive to the inflammatory rhetoric, as their country was undergoing social unrest. Around the same time, Sankara and other key figures in the CNR became convinced that Traoré was harbouring opposition to the Burkinabé regime in Bamako and plotting to provoke a border war, which would be used to support a counterrevolution.

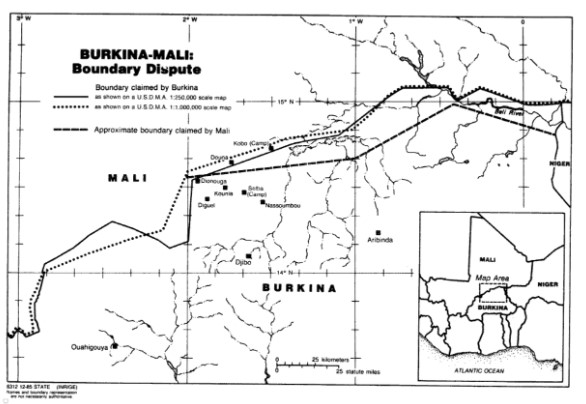
United States Department of State map showing the competing claims of Mali and Burkina Faso in the Agacher Strip

Tensions at the border began to rise on 24 November when a Burkinabé national was killed near the border in Soum Province. Malian police crossed the boundary to arrest the murderer and also detained several members of a local Committee for the Defence of the Revolution who were preparing a tribunal. Three days later, Malian police entered Kounia to 'restore order'. Burkina Faso made diplomatic representations on the incidents to Mali, but was given no formal response.

At the beginning of December, Burkina Faso informed Mali and other surrounding countries that it was conducting its decennial national census from 10 to 20 December. On 14 December, military personnel entered the Agacher to assist with the census. Mali accused the military authorities of pressuring Malian citizens in border villages to register with the census, a charge which Burkina Faso disputed. In an attempt to reduce tensions, ANAD (a West African treaty organization) dispatched a delegation to Bamako and Ouagadougou to mediate. President of Algeria Chadli Bendjedid contacted Sankara and Traoré to encourage a peaceful resolution. At the request of ANAD members, Burkina Faso announced the withdrawal of all military personnel from the disputed region.

Despite the declared withdrawal, a 'war of the communiques' ensued as Burkinabé and Malian authorities exchanged hostile messages. Feeling threatened by Sankara, Traoré began preparing Mali for hostilities with Burkina Faso. Three groupements were formed and planned to invade Burkina Faso and converge on the city of Bobo-Dioulasso. Once there, they would rally Burkinabé opposition forces to take Ouagadougou and overthrow Sankara.

Former Sankara aide Paul Michaud wrote that Sankara had intended to provoke Mali into conflict with the aim of mobilizing popular support for his regime. According to Michaud, "an official—and reliable—Malian source" had reported that mobilization documents dating to 19 December were found on the bodies of fallen Burkinabé soldiers during the ensuing war.

Sankara's efforts to provide evidence of his bona fides were systematically undermined. 'It is hard to believe that the Malian authorities are unaware that the rumors circulating are false,' says U.S. Ambassador Leonardo Neher. In contrast to Michaud's assertion, a Central Intelligence Agency (CIA) cable states, 'The war was born of Bamako's hope that the conflict would trigger a coup in Burkina Faso.'

At dawn on 25 December 1985, about 150 Malian Armed Forces tanks crossed the frontier and attacked several locations. Malian troops also attempted to envelop Bobo-Dioulasso in a pincer attack. The Burkina Faso Army struggled to repel the offensive in the face of superior Malian firepower and was overwhelmed on the northern front; Malian forces quickly secured the towns of Dionouga, Selba, Kouna, and Douna in the Agacher. The Burkinabé government in Ouagadougou received word of hostilities at about 13:00 and immediately issued mobilization orders. Various security measures were also imposed across the country, including nighttime blackouts.

Burkinabé forces regrouped in the Dionouga area to counter-attack. Captain Compaoré took command of this western front. Under his leadership, soldiers split into small groups and employed guerrilla tactics against Malian tanks.

Immediately after hostilities began, other African leaders attempted to institute a truce. On the morning of 30 December, Burkina Faso and Mali agreed to an ANAD-brokered ceasefire. By then, Mali had occupied most of the Agacher Strip. More than 100 Burkinabé and approximately 40 Malian soldiers and civilians were killed during the war. The Burkinabé towns of Ouahigouya, Djibo, and Nassambou were left badly damaged by the fighting.

At an ANAD summit in Yamoussoukro on 17 January 1987, Traoré and Sankara met and formalized an agreement to end hostilities. The ICJ later split the Agacher; Mali received the more-densely populated western portion and Burkina Faso the eastern section centred on the Béli River. Both countries indicated their satisfaction with the judgement.

Burkina Faso declared that the war was part of an 'international plot' to bring down Sankara's government. It rejected speculation that it was fought over rumoured mineral wealth in the Agacher. The country's relatively poor performance in the conflict damaged the domestic credibility of the CNR. Some Burkinabé soldiers were angered by Sankara's failure to prosecute the war more aggressively and rally a counteroffensive against Mali.

The conflict also demonstrated the country's weak international position and forced the CNR to craft a more moderate image of its policies and goals abroad. In the aftermath, the Burkinabé government made little reference to supporting revolution in other countries, and its relations with France modestly improved. At a rally held after the war, Sankara conceded that his country's military was not adequately armed and announced the commutation of sentences for numerous political prisoners.

=== Relations with other countries ===
Thomas Sankara defined his program as anti-imperialist. In this respect, France became the main target of revolutionary statements. When President François Mitterrand visited Burkina Faso in November 1986, Sankara criticized the French for having received P. W. Botha, the Prime Minister of South Africa, which still enforced apartheid; and Jonas Savimbi, the leader of UNITA, in France, referring to both men as 'covered in blood from head to toe'. In response, France reduced its economic aid to Burkina Faso by 80% between 1983 and 1985.

Guy Penne, President Mitterrand's advisor on African affairs, organized a media campaign in France to denigrate Thomas Sankara in collaboration with the DGSE. It provided the press with a series of documents on supposed atrocities intended to feed articles against him.

Sankara set up a program of cooperation with Cuba. After meeting with Fidel Castro, Sankara arranged to send young Burkinabés to Cuba in September 1986 to receive professional training and to participate in the country's development upon their return. These were volunteers recruited on the basis of a competition; priority was given to orphans and young people from rural and disadvantaged areas. Some 600 teenagers were flown to Cuba to complete their schooling and receive professional training to become doctors (particularly gynecologists), engineers, or agronomists.

Denouncing the support of the United States to Israel and South Africa, he called on African countries to boycott the 1984 Summer Olympics in Los Angeles. At the United Nations General Assembly, he denounced the invasion of Grenada by the United States. The U.S. responded by implementing trade sanctions against Burkina Faso. Also at the UN, Sankara called for an end to the veto power granted to the great powers. In the name of the 'right of peoples to sovereignty', he supported the national demands of the Western Sahara, Palestine, the Nicaraguan Sandinistas, and the South African ANC.

While he had good relations with Ghanaian leader Jerry Rawlings and Libyan leader Muammar Gaddafi, Sankara was relatively isolated in West Africa. Leaders close to France, such as Félix Houphouët-Boigny in Ivory Coast and Hassan II in Morocco, were particularly hostile to him.

=== Criticism ===
The British development organization Oxfam recorded the arrest of trade union leaders in 1987. In 1984, seven individuals associated with the previous régime in Burkina Faso were accused of treason and executed after a summary trial. Non-governmental organizations and unions were harassed or placed under the authority of the Committees for the Defense of the Revolution, branches of which were established in each workplace and which functioned as 'organs of political and social control'.

Three days after Sankara had assumed power in 1983 through the popular revolution, the National Union of African Teachers of Upper Volta (SNEAHV) called Sankara and his government fascist and called upon workers to be ready to fight for their freedom. As a result, the government ordered the arrest of four key figures of the SNEAHV; one was released shortly after. In response, the SNEAHV called for a national teachers' strike to protest the arrests. The government saw this as something that endangered the politically weak Upper Volta, which had already faced five coups since its independence. Therefore, the minister for National Education called upon directors of private schools "not to use the services of the strikers in their establishments". The call affected 1300-1500 teachers.

Popular Revolutionary Tribunals, set up by the government throughout the country, placed defendants on trial for corruption, tax evasion or 'counter-revolutionary' activity. Procedures in these trials, especially legal protections for the accused, did not conform to international standards. According to Christian Morrisson and Jean-Paul Azam of the Organisation for Economic Co-operation and Development, the 'climate of urgency and drastic action in which many punishments were carried out immediately against those who had the misfortune to be found guilty of unrevolutionary behaviour, bore some resemblance to what occurred in the worst days of the French Revolution, during the Reign of Terror. Although few people were killed, violence was widespread'.

== Death ==
On 15 October 1987, Sankara and twelve other officials were killed in a coup d'état organized by his former colleague Blaise Compaoré. When accounting for his overthrow, Compaoré stated that Sankara jeopardized foreign relations with former colonial power France and neighbouring Ivory Coast, and accused his former comrade of plotting to assassinate opponents.

Prince Johnson, a former Liberian warlord allied to Charles Taylor and killer of the Liberian president Samuel Doe whose last hours of life were filmed, told Liberia's Truth and Reconciliation Commission that it was engineered by Taylor. After the coup and although Sankara was known to be dead, some CDRs mounted an armed resistance to the army for several days.

According to Halouna Traoré, the sole survivor of Sankara's assassination, Sankara was attending a meeting with the Conseil de l'Entente. His assassins singled out Sankara and executed him. The assassins then shot at those attending the meeting, killing 12 other people. Sankara's body was riddled with bullets to the back and he was quickly buried in an unmarked grave while his widow Mariam and two children fled the country. Compaoré immediately reversed the nationalizations, overturned nearly all of Sankara's policies, rejoined the International Monetary Fund and World Bank to bring in 'desperately needed' funds to restore the 'shattered' economy and ultimately spurned most of Sankara's legacy. Compaoré's dictatorship remained in power for 27 years until it was overthrown by popular protests in 2014.

=== Trial ===
In 2017, the Burkina Faso government officially asked the French government to release military documents on the killing of Sankara after his widow accused France of masterminding his assassination. French president Emmanuel Macron promised to declassify French documents concerning Sankara's assassination.

In April 2021, 34 years after Sankara's assassination, former president Compaoré and 13 others were indicted for complicity in the murder of Sankara as well as other crimes in the coup. This development came as part of President Roch Marc Christian Kaboré's framework of 'national reconciliation'.

In October 2021, the trial against Compaoré and 13 others began in Ouagadougou, with Compaoré being tried in absentia. Ex-presidential security chief Hyacinthe Kafondo, was also tried in absentia. A week before the trial, Compaoré's lawyers stated that he would not be attending the trial, which they characterized as having defects, and also emphasized his privilege for immunity, being the former head of state. After requests made by the defence attorneys for more time to prepare their defence, the hearing was postponed until 1 March.

On 6 April 2022, Compaoré and two others were found guilty and sentenced to life in prison in absentia. Eight others were sentenced to between 3 and 20 years in prison. Three were found innocent.

== Exhumation ==
The exhumation of what are believed to be the remains of Sankara started on African Liberation Day, 25 May 2015. Permission for an exhumation was denied during the rule of his successor, Blaise Compaoré. The exhumation would allow the family to formally identify the remains, a long-standing demand of his family and supporters.

In October 2015, one of the lawyers for Sankara's widow Mariam reported that the autopsy revealed that Sankara's body was 'riddled' with 'more than a dozen' bullets.

In 2025, Sankara and those killed alongside him in the 1987 coup were reinterred in a mausoleum built on the site of the Conseil de l’Entente in Ouagadougou.

== Legacy ==
The coat of arms of Burkina Faso under Sankara from 1984 to 1987, featuring a crossed mattock and AK-47 (an allusion to the hammer and sickle) with the motto La Patrie ou la Mort, nous vaincrons ('Fatherland or death, we will win'). A mattock and AK-47 are also featured on the Coat of arms of Mozambique, while the motto below the arms is also the current motto of Cuba, although in Spanish.

Accompanying his personal charisma, Sankara had an array of original initiatives that contributed to his popularity and brought some international media attention to his government.

=== Solidarity ===
- He sold off the government fleet of Mercedes cars and made the Renault 5 (the cheapest car sold in Burkina Faso at that time) the official service car of the ministers.
- He reduced the salaries of well-off public servants (including his own) and forbade the use of government chauffeurs and first class airline tickets.
- He opposed foreign aid, saying that 'He who feeds you, controls you'.
- He spoke in forums like the Organisation of African Unity against what he described as neocolonialist penetration of Africa through Western trade and finance.
- He called for a united front of African nations to repudiate their external debt. He argued that the poor and exploited did not have an obligation to repay money to the rich and exploiting.

Thomas knew how to show his people that they could become dignified and proud through will power, courage, honesty and work. What remains above all of my husband is his integrity.

— Mariam Sankara, Thomas' widow
- In Ouagadougou, Sankara converted the army's provisioning store into a state-owned supermarket open to everyone (the first supermarket in the country).
- He forced well-off civil servants to pay one month's salary to public projects.
- He refused to use the air conditioning in his office on the grounds that such luxury was not available to anyone but a handful of Burkinabés.
- As President, he lowered his salary to $450 a month and limited his possessions to a car, four bikes, three guitars, a refrigerator, and a broken freezer.

=== Style ===
- He required public servants to wear a traditional tunic, woven from Burkinabé cotton and sewn by Burkinabé craftsmen.
- He was known for jogging unaccompanied through Ouagadougou in his track suit and posing in his tailored military fatigues, with his mother-of-pearl pistol.
- When asked why he did not want his portrait hung in public places, as was the norm for other African leaders (many of whom made use of the cult of personality), Sankara replied: "There are seven million Thomas Sankaras".
- An accomplished guitarist, he wrote the new national anthem himself.

=== Burkina Faso ===
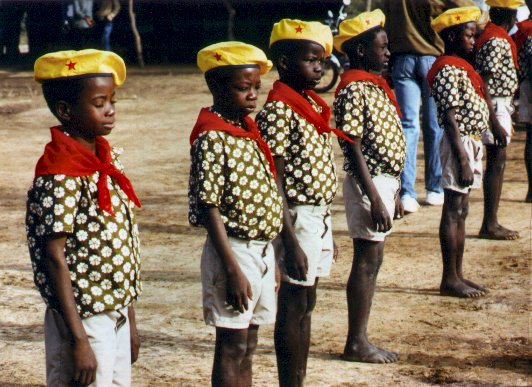
Pioneers of the Revolution

A statue of Sankara was unveiled in 2019 at the location in Ouagadougou where he was assassinated; however, due to complaints that it did not match his facial features, a new statue was unveiled a year later.

In 2023, the government of Burkina Faso formally proclaimed Sankara as a "hero of the nation".

In October 2023, on the 36th anniversary of his assassination, the government changed the name of a main road in Ouagadougou to honor Sankara. The road in question was the Boulevard Charles de Gaulle, now known as Boulevard Capitaine Thomas Isidore Noël Sankara.

=== International recognition ===
Cuba awarded Sankara with the highest honour of the state, the Order of José Martí.

Twenty years after his assassination, Sankara was commemorated on 15 October 2007 in ceremonies that took place in Burkina Faso, Mali, Senegal, Niger, Tanzania, Burundi, France, Canada and the United States.

==== Africa's Che Guevara ====
Sankara is often referred to as "Africa's Che Guevara". Sankara gave a speech marking and honouring the 20th anniversary of Che Guevara's 9 October 1967 execution, one week before his own assassination on 15 October 1987.

== List of works ==
- Thomas Sankara Speaks: The Burkina Faso Revolution, 1983–87, Pathfinder Press: 1988. ISBN 0-87348-527-0.
- We Are the Heirs of the World's Revolutions: Speeches from the Burkina Faso Revolution 1983–87, Pathfinder Press: 2007. ISBN 0-87348-989-6.
- Women's Liberation and the African Freedom Struggle, Pathfinder Press: 1990. ISBN 0-87348-585-8.

== See also ==
- Ecology in Thomas Sankara's policies

== Sources ==
- Englebert, Pierre (2018). Burkina Faso: Unsteady Statehood In West Africa. New York: Routledge. ISBN 9780429970481.
- Harsch, Ernest (2014). Thomas Sankara: An African Revolutionary (illustrated, reprint ed.). Athens: Ohio University Press. ISBN 9780821445075.
- Imperato, Pascal James (2019). Mali: A Search For Direction. New York: Routledge. ISBN 9780429718106.
- Johnson, Segun (1 July 1986). "Burkina-Mali War: Is Nigeria Still a Regional Power". India Quarterly: A Journal of International Affairs. 42 (3): 294–308. doi:10.1177/097492848604200306. S2CID 154699898.
- Kasuka, Bridgette (2012). Prominent African Leaders Since Independence. Bankole Kamara Taylor. ISBN 978-1-4700-4358-2.
- Martin, Guy (2012). African Political Thought. Springer. ISBN 978-1-137-06205-5.
- Murrey, Amber, ed. (2018). A Certain Amount of Madness: The Life, Politics and Legacies of Thomas Sankara. Afterword by Aziz Salmone Fall (first ed.). London: Pluto Press. doi:10.2307/j.ctt21kk235. ISBN 9780745337586. JSTOR j.ctt21kk235.
- Naldi, Gino J. (October 1986). "Case concerning the Frontier Dispute between Burkina Faso and Mali: Provisional Measures of Protection". The International and Comparative Law Quarterly. 35 (4): 970–975. doi:10.1093/iclqaj/35.4.970. JSTOR 759886.
- Peterson, Brian James (2021). Thomas Sankara: a revolutionary in Cold War Africa. Bloomington, Indiana: Indiana University Press. ISBN 9780253053763.
- Rupley, Lawrence; Bangali, Lamissa; Diamitani, Boureima (2013). Historical Dictionary of Burkina Faso (revised ed.). Lanham: Rowman & Littlefield. ISBN 9780810867703.
- Salliot, Emmanuel (2010), A review of past security events in the Sahel 1967–2007 (PDF), Security Implications of Climate Change in the Sahel Region, Sahel and West Africa Club Secretariat
- Sankara, Thomas (2007). Prairie, Michel (ed.). Thomas Sankara Speaks: the Burkina Faso Revolution: 1983–87. Pathfinder.
- Uwechue, Raph (1991). Africa Today (second ed.). London: Africa Books Limited. ISBN 9780903274166.

Political offices
Preceded by Jean-Baptiste Ouédraogo	President of Upper Volta (Burkina Faso); 1983–1987	Succeeded by Blaise Compaoré
