= African Independence Party (Touré) =

- Leader: Soumane Touré
- Founded: 1999
- Dissolved: September 2011
- Succeeded by: Party of Independence, Labour and Justice
- Ideology: Socialism
- Political position: Left-wing

The African Independence Party (French: Parti Africain de l’Indépendance) was a political party in Burkina Faso, led by Soumane Touré. It was formed in 1999 when Touré broke away from the original PAI.

Touré's PAI joined the government and obtained the legal recognition to the name PAI.

At the legislative elections, 5 May 2002, the party won 3.6% of the popular vote and 5 out of 111 seats.

Touré won 1.1% of the vote in the presidential elections of 2005. At the 2007 parliamentary elections, the party won 1 seat.

The party published L'Avant-Garde.

Touré's PAI lost the registration of the party name in June 2011. In September 2011 Touré founded a new party, the Party of Independence, Labour and Justice (PITJ).
