= Silmi-mossi =

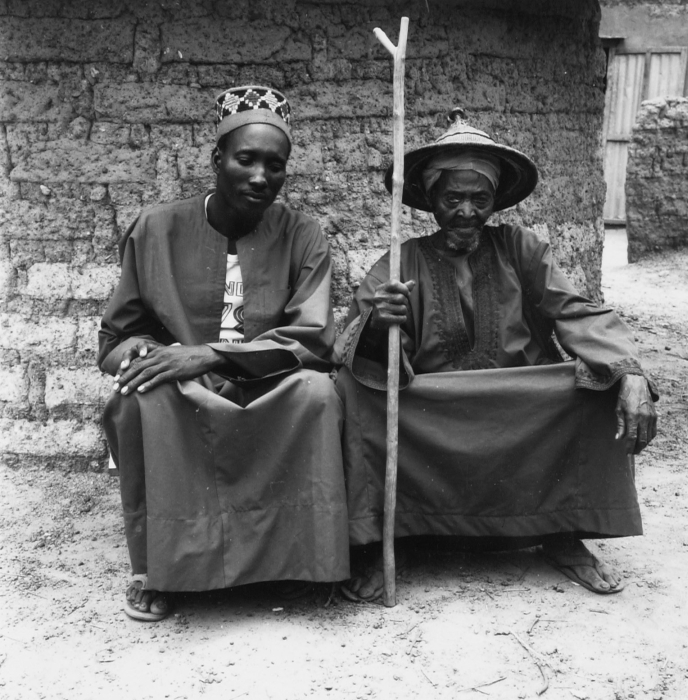

Regions with significant populations
- Yatenga (northern Burkina Faso)

Languages
- Moore, French

Religion
- Predominantly Sunni Islam, minority Christianity

Related ethnic groups
- Mossi peoples

The Silmi-mossi or Silmimoosé, Silmi-moosé, are a people of Burkina Faso of mixed Mossi and Fulani origin. They are historically based in the Yatenga in the north and speak in Moore language. They are attached to the Mossi with whom they share the same culture and constitute a Mossi sub group.

The Sankaras come from a Fulani-Mossis lineage also called the Silmimoose. Fulanis and Mossis today represent the most important cultural groups in Burkina Faso, respectively 10% and 52%, and the most mobile. The Fulanis being breeders and the Mossis farmers, their meeting was natural. "The Silmiisi met the Moose on the Moogo territory in the 15th century. The routes of their fortune have sometimes crossed on the same territory as inhabitants, through battlefields as campaign allies of a time, or as enemies in other circumstances. In any case, the needs of men through the imperatives of politics, the economy and nature have cut the spaces for farmers and the paths for breeders. On this soil plowed by peasant tools and dug by the hooves of horses and oxen, the Moose and the Silmiisi forged relationships, tied alliances, poured and shared their blood. The Silmimoose were born then, sons of history, from the need to exchange between lineages and societies. The meeting between farmers and breeders gave birth to farmers-breeders.

== Origin ==
The Silmi-Mossi are a very interesting mixed race found in the circles of Ouahigouya and Ouagadougou. Mixed races are not rare in West Africa: the Toucouleurs of Fouta-Toro, the Foulahs of Fouta-Djallon, the Ouassoulonkés, the Foulankés, the Khassonkés, are mixed races composed of fulanis and 'Negroes', fulani and Sereres (or wolofs) for the Toucouleurs, fulani and Mandés (mainly Malinkes) for the other races.

But it will be noticed that all these mixed races are located west of the Niger Loop. In the Niger loop itself, where the Voltaic (Mole-dagbon...) races are, there has been little mixing of fulanis with other ethnic groups. The Silmi-Mossi, a mixture of fulanis and Mossis, are the only mixed race known on this side and they are still very few and little known. The word Silmi-Mossi means "Fulani-Mossi" in Mossi language, from Silmiiga (pl.Silmiisi) which means fulani, foulbe; and of Moaaga (at pl. Moosé) which naturally designates the Mossi. We should therefore say exactly a Silmi-moaaga in the singular, the Silmisi-Moosé in the plural, but, by abbreviation, the Mossis say a Silmi-moaaga, Silmi-Mossi.

The 1904 Monograph says about their origin: "Next to the Foulbés we must also place the Silmi-moose came to the Yatenga 70 years ago and who come from the crossing of a fulani with a Mossi about 150 years ago [so in 1753] a Fittob of 'Bahn,' from the family of the current leader Demba Sidiki, wanted to settle in the region of Téma, today circle of Ouagadougou. His wife having died without leaving children, this Fulani obtained with a few oxen a mossi woman, daughter of the chief of Téma, from whom he had several children thus forming the strain of the Silmi-Mossis

For his part, Vadier said: "Around 1780, under the reign of the fittobé fulani chief Hamat Diam, living in Bahn, a fulani named Pabé left the Bahn region alone to graze his herd in the region of Téma (circle of Ouagadougou). He married the daughter of the chief of this province who was of the Mossi race (this woman was called Siboudou) and with a fulani woman from Ouagadougou. Pabé settled in Téma, had no children from his fulani wife but his mossi wife gave him five sons and a daughter. The sons were called Mali, Koumbasé, Garba, Faéné, Sambo, the daughter Sadia.The girl married a Mossi from Gourki, north of Téma, but had no offspring. Pabé and his sons returned to Kalsaka (Yatenga), 60 kilometers southeast of Ouahigouya where they did both livestock and crops. Pabé leaving his children in Kalsaka came to die in Bane.

Garba and his brothers, fearing that they could not be received by their father's family and having mossi blood in their veins, remained in Kalsaka where they married Mossi women. The descendants then united with Mossis, but never with Fulanis. Becoming numerous, the Silmi-Mossis had to leave Kalsaka in part. Some settled in Béma, Bérenga, Rima, Tougo, Lébenga, then extended on the circle of Ouagadougou to Téma, Yako, etc. "Ultimately, the Silmi-Mossi come from a mixture of fulani (Fittobés) and Mossis. The physiological type is rather mossi than fulani and in this mixture the Mossis seem to win.Their culture is similar to that of moaaga, and the typical chiefdom of the Moose. They speak the moore like the Mossi.

== Geographic location ==
The Silmi-Mossi occupy in the Yatenga the basin of the southern part of the White Volta, from about Tougouya to Bérenga. Once there, at the junction of the marigot de Todiam and the marigot de Niességa which together form the Volta Blanche as found in the circle of Ouagadougou, they follow, to the north, the valley of the marigot de Niességa from Rodoma and Béma to the east to Tarba and Kountighé to the west. These are the Silmi-Mossi from the regions of Tougouya, Koukabako, Kalsaka, Rodoma, Tongo and Goursi

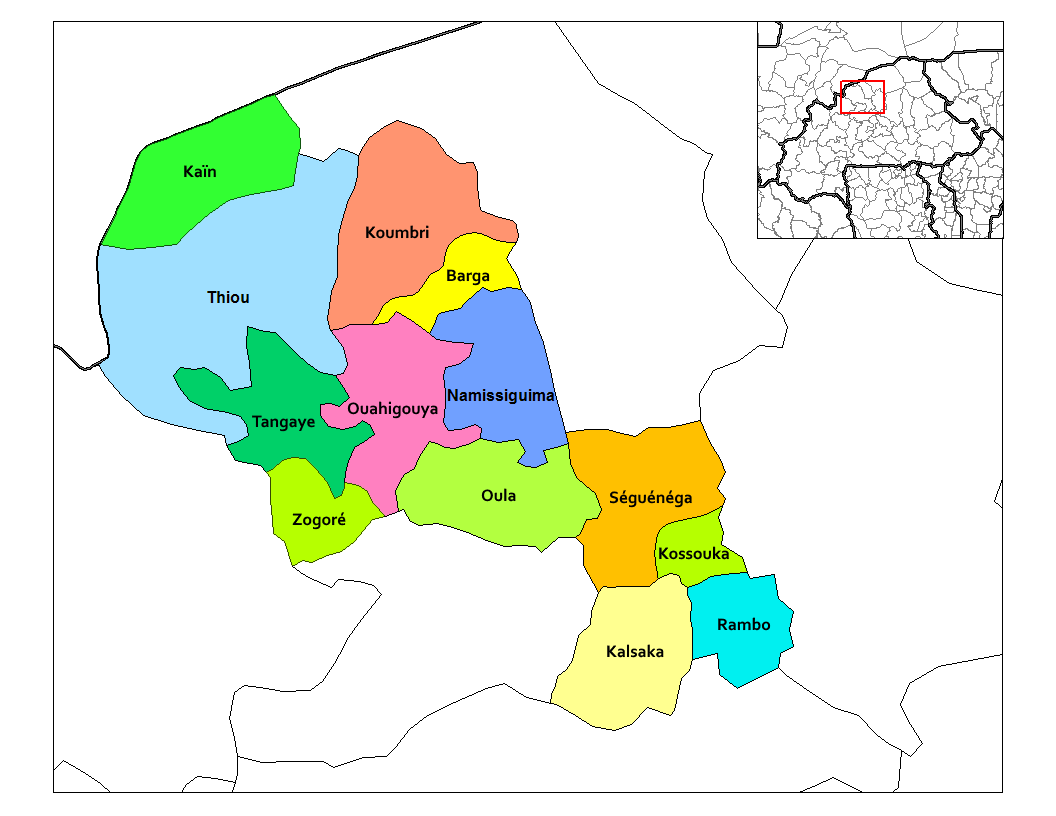
Department of Yatenga, origine of Silmimossé

In addition, some Silmi-Mossis settled further north, in the thalweg of the marigot de Todiam, among the Foulbés Torombés from Bassanga to Titao and others even grew in the north of the circle to Koùmbané, Damdollé and Pogoro.

Ultimately, the Silmi-Mossi are mainly established in the southeast of the Yatenga, without having penetrated the large cantons of the extreme southeast (Koussouka, Zitenga and Riziam).

They form 45 villages (or village districts, because they are often established in a Mossi village where they form a separate neighborhood). As there are exactly 5,627 (according to my March 1915 census), that makes 125 people per village (or neighborhood) on average. We therefore see that the Silmi-Mossi form small establishments, a trend that is even more characterized and more accentuated in the pure Peuls.

== Culture ==
The Silmi-Mossis of Yatenga are both farmers and herders.Theirs family names are Sankara, Sinaré, Zida, Bandé, Kaboré...

== Personnalies ==
- Thomas Sankara
- Bénéwendé Stanislas Sankara
- Odile Sankara
- Said Sinare
- Kassoum Sinare
- Hassan Bandé

== See also ==
- Demographics of Burkina Faso
- List of ethnic groups of Africa
- Mossi
