= Revolutionary terror =

Use of force against counter-revolutionaries

Revolutionary terror, also referred to as revolutionary terrorism or reign of terror, refers to the institutionalized application of force to counter-revolutionaries, particularly during the French Revolution from the years 1793 to 1795 (see the Reign of Terror). The term "Communist terrorism" has also been used to describe the revolutionary terror, from the Red Terror in Russia and Cultural Revolution in China to the reign of the Khmer Rouge and others. In contrast, "reactionary terror", often called White Terrors, has been used to subdue revolutions.

== Origins, evolution, and history ==
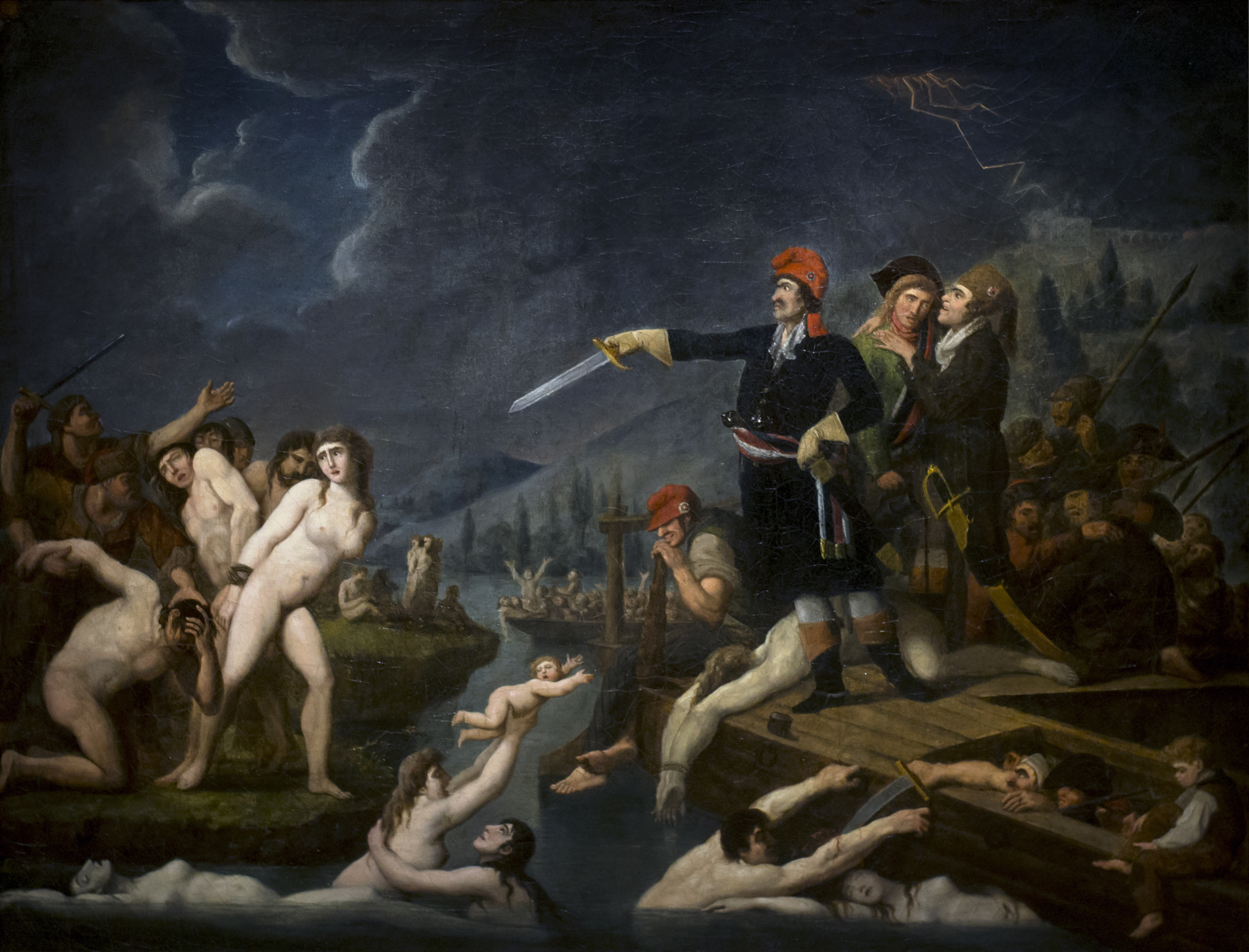
The Drownings at Nantes, anonymous period painting

German Social Democrat Karl Kautsky traces the origins of revolutionary terror to the Reign of Terror of the French Revolution. Vladimir Lenin considered the Jacobin use of terror as a needed virtue and accepted the label Jacobin for his Bolsheviks. However, this distinguished him from Karl Marx.

The deterministic view of history was used by Communist states to justify the use of terror. Terrorism came to be used by communists, both the state and dissident groups, in both revolution and in consolidation of power. The doctrines of anarchism, Marxism, Marxism–Leninism and Maoism have all spurred dissidents who have taken to terrorism. After World War I communist groups continued to use it in attempts to overthrow governments. For Mao Zedong, terrorism was an acceptable tool.

After World War II, Marxist–Leninist groups seeking independence, like nationalists, concentrated on guerrilla warfare along with terrorism. By the late 1950s and early 1960s, there was a change from wars of national liberation to contemporary terrorism. For decades, terrorist groups tended to be closely linked to communist ideology, being the predominant category of terrorists in the 1970s and 1980s, but today they are in the minority. Their decline is attributed to the end of the Cold War and the fall of the Soviet Union.

French historian Sophie Wahnich distinguishes between the revolutionary terror of the French Revolution and modern day Islamic terrorism and the September 11 attacks:

Revolutionary terror is not terrorism. To make a moral equivalence between the Revolution's year II and September 2001 is historical and philosophical nonsense[.] [...] The violence exercised on 11 September 2001 aimed neither at equality nor liberty. Nor did the preventive war announced by the president of the United States.

== Revolutionary violence in Marxism ==
In his article "The Victory of the Counter-Revolution in Vienna" in the Neue Rheinische Zeitung (No. 136, 7 November 1848), Karl Marx wrote, describing the violence that had been committed by "the bourgeoise" in the Revolutions of 1848 in the Austrian Empire:

The purposeless massacres perpetrated since the June and October events, the tedious offering of sacrifices since February and March, the very cannibalism of the counterrevolution will convince the nations that there is only one way in which the murderous death agonies of the old society and the bloody birth throes of the new society can be shortened, simplified and concentrated, and that way is revolutionary terror.

In his biography of Joseph Stalin, Edvard Radzinsky, a Russian author of popular history books, noted that Stalin wrote a nota bene—"Terror is the quickest way to new society"—beside the above passage in a book by Karl Kautsky.

The Bolsheviks engaged in a form of social determinism that was hostile to bourgeoisie and wealthier classes. Martin Latsis, one of the Soviet leaders directing the Cheka, stated his intentions for those classes who were considered reactionary and incapable of being reeducated. Latsis wrote:

We are engaged in exterminating the bourgeoisie as a class. You need not prove that this or that man acted against the interests of the Soviet power. The first thing you have to ask an arrested person is: To what class does he belong, where does he come from, what kind of education did he have, what is his occupation? These questions are to decide the fate of the accused. That is the quintessence of the Red Terror.

On the other hand, they opposed individual terror, which has been used earlier by the People's Will organization. According to Trotsky: "The damaging of machines by workers, for example, is terrorism in this strict sense of the word. The killing of an employer, a threat to set fire to a factory or a death threat to its owner, an assassination attempt, with revolver in hand, against a government minister—all these are terrorist acts in the full and authentic sense. However, anyone who has an idea of the true nature of international Social Democracy ought to know that it has always opposed this kind of terrorism and does so in the most irreconcilable way".

== France ==
The French Revolution began in 1789, but by 1793, the new government began to search for new means to defend itself. The Sans-Culottes had demanded government action against enemies and the remains of the Old Regime, spanning from the General Maximum (which guaranteed the price of staple commodities) to the execution of several dozen prisoners. The murder of the radical republican writer Jean-Paul Marat in July 1793 in his own bath intensified the situation.The Jacobin Government adopted policies of Terror in the most dire days of the civil and foreign wars against the Revolution: September, 1793. French Historian Albert Soboul writes: "On 5 September the Terror was made official policy." For the rest of that September, more laws were made that targeted counterrevolutionaries, and granted and enforced the demands of the Sans-Culottes. The next year was dominated by the hunt for and execution or imprisonment of enemies the Revolution, the Jacobins, and France. Maximilien Robespierre, the leader of the Jacobins, justified the violence by saying: “Subdue by terror the enemies of liberty, and you will be right, as founders of the Republic. The government of the revolution is liberty's despotism against tyranny. Is force made only to protect crime? And is the thunderbolt not destined to strike the heads of the proud?”

Despite the efforts to subdue the enemies of the Revolution, the situation continued to deteriorate until the Law of 22 Prairial, Year II (June 10, 1794) was enacted intensifying state-violence at home and beginning what is referred to by historians as the "Great Terror." 1,376 people were killed by July 26, 1794. However, the French victory at the Battle of Fleurus (June 1794) had all but secured the Revolution's safety from imminent foreign invasion and gave the Revolutionaries room to breathe and reassess the domestic situation. This led to the conservative backlash in late July 1794 (called Thermidor for the month it was according to the Revolutionary Calendar) and the fall of the Jacobin Government with the execution of Robespierre (July 28, 1794).

== Soviet Union ==
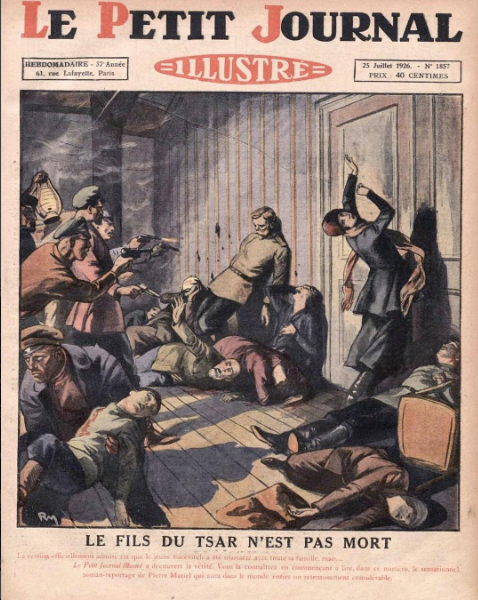
Execution of the Romanov family in 1918, Le Petit Journal

=== Red Terror ===
Lenin, Trotsky, and other leading Bolshevik ideologists promulgated mass terror as a necessary weapon during the dictatorship of proletariat and the resulting class struggle. Similarly, in his book Terrorism and Communism (1920), Trotsky emphasized that "the historical tenacity of the bourgeoisie is colossal [...] We are forced to tear off this class and chop it away. The Red Terror is a weapon used against a class that, despite being doomed to destruction, does not want to perish". Trotsky also argued that the reign of terror began with the White Terror under the White Guard forces and the Bolsheviks responded with the Red Terror.

Many later Marxists, in particular Karl Kautsky, criticized Bolshevik leaders for terrorism tactics. He stated that "among the phenomena for which Bolshevism has been responsible, Terrorism, which begins with the abolition of every form of freedom of the Press, and ends in a system of wholesale execution, is certainly the most striking and the most repellent of all". Kautsky argued that that Red Terror represented a variety of terrorism because it was indiscriminate, intended to frighten the civilian population and included taking and executing hostages.

The Red Terror (1917-1920) opposed the forces of the White Armies who wanted to reverse the Russian Revolution. It saw the encouraging of peasant seizure of land, the discovery of foreign agents, and the rooting out of old Czarist officials. Estimates of the death toll vary widely, but academic estimates range from 50,000 to 140,000.

=== Black Terror ===
The anarchist Kontrrazvedka, the intelligence section of the Revolutionary Insurgent Army of Ukraine, resorted to methods of terror as seen with the "Black Terror" campaign. Nestor Makhno, leader of the Makhnovist movement, listed 80 targets to be liquidated in Alexandrovsk, including Mensheviks, Narodniks and Right Socialist-Revolutionaries. The scale of the Black Terror was insignificant compared to the Red or White Terror with only 70 victims of the extrajudicial organs in Yekaterinoslav.

=== State terror in the Soviet Union ===
The Great Purge refers collectively to several related campaigns of political repression and persecution in the Soviet Union orchestrated by Joseph Stalin during the 1930s, which removed all of his remaining opposition from power. It involved the purge of the Communist Party of the Soviet Union and the persecution of unaffiliated persons, both occurring within a period characterized by omnipresent police surveillance, widespread suspicion of "saboteurs", imprisonment and killings. In the Western World, this was referred to as "the Great Terror".

== China ==
During the Chinese Communist Revolution, the Chinese Communist Party (CCP) had encouraged and overseen the execution and imprisonment of landlords by their former tenants in the countryside. Upon the Kuomintang's retreat to Taiwan, Mao Zedong and the other leaders of the CCP oversaw a terror in line with their Marxist–Leninist principles. According to the official statistics from the People's Daily of the CCP Central Committee in 1954, at least 1.3 million people were imprisoned in the Campaign to Suppress Counterrevolutionaries in 1950–1953, and 712 thousand people were executed. The tactics of the Terror was also used by Red Guards during the Cultural Revolution of 1966-1976. Mao encouraged this by telling his followers to "Bombard the Headquarters" to remove bureaucrats from power.

== See also ==
- Communist terrorism
- Direct action
- Left-wing terrorism
- Propaganda of the deed
- Revolutionary Tribunal (disambiguation)
