= Hymne National Voltaïque =

National anthem of Upper Volta

English: National Anthem of Upper Volta
- National anthem of Upper Volta
- Also known as: La Volta (English: The Volta)
- Lyrics: Robert Ouédraogo
- Music: Robert Ouédraogo
- Adopted: 1960
- Relinquished: 2 August 1984
- Succeeded by: "Une Seule Nuit"

Audio sample
- A digital instrumental of the Voltaïque National Anthem, "La Volta".: file; help

The Hymne National Voltaïque was the national anthem of Upper Volta from 1960 until 1984, when the country's name was changed to Burkina Faso, and the current anthem Une Seule Nuit was adopted. The song was written and composed by Robert Ouédraogo.

== Lyrics ==
=== French ===
Fière Volta de mes aieux,
Ton soleil ardent et glorieux
Te revêt d'or et de fierté
Ô Reine drapée de loyauté !

Nous te ferons et plus forte, et plus belle
À ton amour nous resterons fidèles
Et nos cœurs vibrant de fierté
Acclameront ta beauté
Vers l'horizon lève les yeux
Frémis aux accents tumultueux
De tes fiers enfants tous dressés
Promesses d'avenir caressées

Le travail de ton sol brûlant
Sans fin trempera les cœurs ardents,
Et les vertus de tes enfants
Le ceindront d'un diadème triomphant.

Que Dieu te garde en sa bonté,
Que du bonheur de ton sol aimé,
L'Amour des frères soit la clé,
Honneur, Unité et Liberté.

=== English translation ===
Proud Volta of my ancestors,
Your ardent and glorious sun
Takes you with gold and pride
O Queen draped with loyalty!

We will make you stronger and more beautiful
To your love we will remain faithful
And our hearts vibrant with pride
Will acclaim your beauty
Towards the horizon look up
Frisks with the tumultuous accents
Of your proud children all trained
Caressed promises of future

The work of your burning ground
Endless will soak the ardent hearts,
And the virtues of your children
The girdle of a triumphant diadem.

May God keep you in his goodness,
May the happiness of your beloved soil,
The love of the brethren be the key,
Honor, Unity and Freedom.
