= Revolutionary Tribunal (disambiguation) =

The Revolutionary Tribunal was established during the French Revolution for the trial of political offenders.

The term revolutionary tribunal or revolutionary court may also refer to:

- Islamic Revolutionary Court, Iran
- Popular Revolutionary Tribunal, (Burkina Faso)
- Revolutionary tribunal (Russia)
- Revolutionary tribunal (Hungary)
- Revolutionary Tribunal (Egypt)
- Revolutionary tribunal (Cuba)
