= 1987 Burkina Faso coup d'état =

Coup that brought Blaise Compaoré to power

Date	15 October 1987
Location	Ouagadougou, Burkina Faso 12°21′26″N 1°32′7″W
Result	Coup attempt succeeds.: Thomas Sankara is overthrown and murdered.; Blaise Compaoré is installed as the new President.

Belligerents
Government of Burkina Faso; CDRs	Burkina Faso Armed Forces; NPFL; Supported by: France; Mali; United States

Commanders and leaders
Thomas Sankara †; Mariam Sankara	Blaise Compaoré; Jean-Baptiste Boukary Lingani; Henri Zongo; Charles Taylor
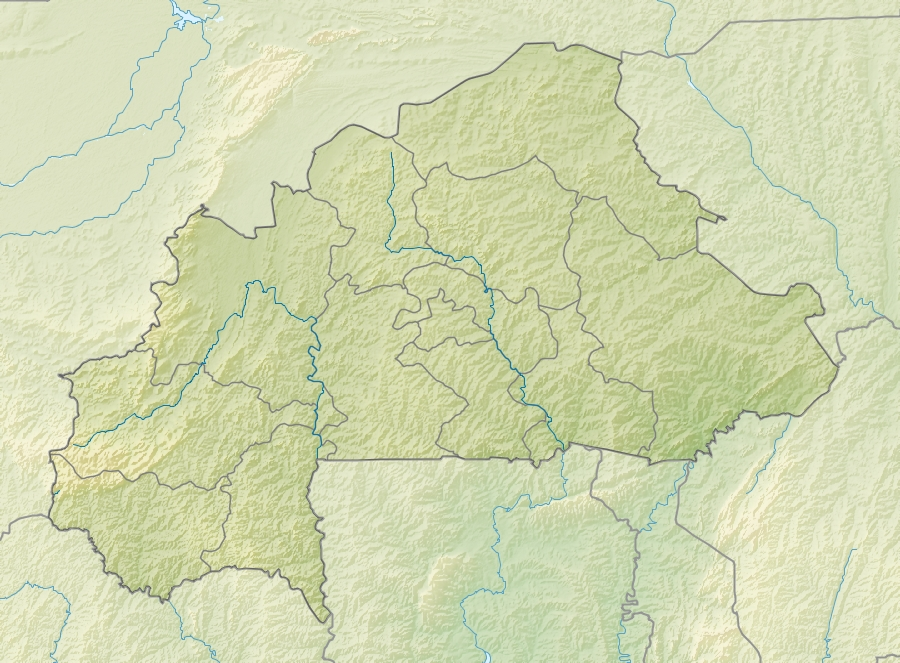
- Nexus of coup in Ouagadougou (marked green), Burkina Faso

The 1987 Burkina Faso coup d'état was a violent military coup in Burkina Faso, which took place on 15 October 1987. The coup was organized by Captain Blaise Compaoré against incumbent far-left President Captain Thomas Sankara, his former friend, bandmate, and associate during the 1983 upheaval.

Compaoré has never acknowledged that a coup had taken place and claims to be a Sankara loyalist.

== Events ==
Sankara was killed by an armed group with twelve other officials in a gun battle at the presidential palace. Immediately, Compaoré assumed the presidency; he cited deterioration in relations with neighbouring countries as one of the reasons for the coup, and stated that Sankara jeopardised foreign relations with former colonial power France and neighbouring Ivory Coast.

== Aftermath ==
Following the coup and although Sankara was known to be dead, some CDRs (formed by Sankara, inspired by the CDRs in Cuba) mounted an armed resistance to the military for several days.

Compaoré described the killing of Sankara as an "accident," but the circumstances have never been properly investigated. Sankara's body was dismembered, and he was buried in an unmarked grave. His widow Mariam and two children fled the nation.

In 1987 the government had claimed Sankara died of natural causes. But a 2015 autopsy revealed that Sankara's body was "riddled" with "more than a dozen" bullets, as reported by one of the lawyers representing Mariam Sankara.

After the coup, Compaoré introduced a policy of "rectification," immediately reversed the nationalizations, overturned nearly all of Sankara's leftist and Third Worldist policies, and rejoined the International Monetary Fund and World Bank to bring in "desperately needed" funds to restore the "shattered" economy.

Initially ruling in a triumvirate under the Popular Front with Major Jean-Baptiste Boukary Lingani and Captain Henri Zongo, in September 1989 Compaoré had these two arrested, charged with plotting to overthrow the government, summarily tried, and executed. Compaoré went on to rule the country until he was ousted in the 2014 Burkinabé uprising.

In 2025, Sankara and those killed alongside him in the 1987 coup were reinterred in a mausoleum built on the site of the Conseil de l’Entente in Ouagadougou.

== Liberian involvement ==
Prince Johnson, a Liberian warlord allied to Charles Taylor, went to Burkina Faso in 1987 to get training for his rebels. While there, he was forced to be part of the assassination of Sankara and his comrades.

After returning to Liberia, Johnson was known for supervising the assassination of president Samuel Doe on Taylor's behalf in another coup. He later told the Liberian Truth and Reconciliation Commission that the coup in Liberia was organized by Taylor, and that he had been freed from prison by the US.

== See also ==
- History of Burkina Faso
