= Mariam Sankara =

First Lady of Burkina Faso 1983–1987 (born 1953)

First Lady of Burkina Faso
- In role 4 August 1983 – 15 October 1987
- President: Thomas Sankara
- Succeeded by: Chantal Compaoré

Personal details
- Born: March 26, 1953 (age 73) French Upper Volta
- Spouse: Thomas Sankara
- Children: 2

Mariam Sankara (French pronunciation: [sɑ̃kaʁa], née Sereme, born 26 March 1953) is the widow of Thomas Sankara, the President of Burkina Faso (previously named Upper Volta) from 4 August 1983 until his assassination on 15 October 1987. During this time, she was First Lady of the country. Thomas Sankara, a Marxist and pan-Africanist army officer, became President of what was then known as the Republic of Upper Volta after a military coup in August 1983. He carried out what he proclaimed to be, the "Democratic and Popular Revolution" (French: Révolution démocratique et populaire), implementing many radical reforms. Sankara was killed in a coup in October 1987, orchestrated by his former friend and colleague Blaise Compaoré.

As a result of the coup, Mariam Sankara was forced to flee Burkina Faso along with her two children. She went into exile in France, where she would spend the next twenty years. Meanwhile, she was replaced as First Lady by Chantal Compaoré. In 1997 she filed a complaint to a Burkinabé court regarding the murder of Thomas, but it wasn't until 28 June 2012 that the Supreme Court ruled that the case could be prosecuted under local jurisprudence. With the gradual opening up of the country's military regime, Sankara was eventually able to return to her home country in 2007, to attend commemorations held in honour of the 20-year anniversary of her husband's death. Large crowds greeted her return to the capital Ouagadougou.

In late October 2014, a large-scale uprising broke out in Burkina Faso, protesting President Blaise Compaoré's attempts to prolong his 27-year rule. As a result of the protests, partially inspired by the memory of Thomas Sankara, Compaoré was forced to resign and fled to the Ivory Coast. In response to this uprising, Mariam Sankara issued a statement congratulating the Burkinabé people for their victory, and calling for Compaoré to be prosecuted for his crimes against the people. She ended the letter by stating: "Long live the Republic and long live Burkina! The motherland or death, we shall overcome."

In October 2021, the trial of the alleged perpetrators of Thomas Sankara's assassination began. Mariam Sankara was present at this trial.
