= Ditanyè =

National anthem of Burkina Faso

- National anthem of Burkina Faso
- Also known as: L'Hymne de la victoire (English: The Anthem of Victory); Une Seule Nuit (English: One Single Night)
- Lyrics: Thomas Sankara
- Music: Thomas Sankara
- Adopted: 2 August 1984
- Preceded by: Hymne National Voltaïque

Audio sample
- file; help

"Ditanyè" (usually written "Le Ditanyè"), also known as "L'Hymne de la victoire" ("The Anthem of Victory", Mossi: "Burkina Faso fãag-m-meng yɩɩlle";) or "Une Seule Nuit" ("One Single Night"), is the national anthem of Burkina Faso. Then-president Thomas Sankara, who was a jazz guitarist, wrote the lyrics. The composer of the melody is unknown, but it has also been attributed to Sankara.

It was adopted during his presidency in a decree issued on 2 August 1984, effective midnight on 4 August 1984, the first anniversary of Sankara's accession to the presidency. The decree also renamed the country from Upper Volta to its current name. The anthem replaced the "Hymne National Voltaïque", the national anthem of Upper Volta.

== Lyrics ==
The first verse and chorus are considered to be the official lyrics, and are performed at most official occasions.

French lyrics

I
Contre la férule humiliante il y a déjà mille ans,
La rapacité venue de loin les asservir il y a cent ans.
Contre la cynique malice métamorphosée
En néocolonialisme et ses petits servants locaux
Beaucoup flanchèrent et certains résistèrent.
Mais les échecs, les succès, la sueur, le sang
Ont fortifié notre peuple courageux
Et fertilisé sa lutte héroïque.

Refrain:
Et une seule nuit a rassemblée en elle l'histoire de tout un peuple.
Et une seule nuit a déclenché sa marche triomphale
Vers l'horizon du bonheur une seule nuit a réconcilié
Notre peuple avec tous les peuples du monde,
A la conquête de la liberté et du progrès
La Patrie ou la mort, nous vaincrons!

II
Nourris à la source vive de la Révolution.
Les engagés volontaires de la liberté et de la paix
Dans l'énergie nocturne et salutaire du 4 août
N'avaient pas que les armes à la main, mais aussi et surtout
La flamme au coeur pour légitimement libérer
Le Faso à jamais des fers de tous ceux qui
Çà et, là en poluaient l'âme sacrée de
L'indépendance, de la souveraineté.

Refrain

III
Et séant désormais en sa dignité recouvrée
L'amour et l'honneur en partage avec l'humanité,
Le peuple du Burkina chante un hymne à la victoire,
A la gloire du travail libérateur, émancipateur.
A bas l'exploitation de l'homme par l'homme!
Hé en avant pour le bonheur de tout homme,
Par tous les hommes aujourd'hui et demain,
Par tous les hommes ici et pour toujours!

Refrain

IV
Révolution populaire notre sève nourricière.
Maternité immortelle du progrès à visage d'homme.
Foyer éternel de démocratie consensuelle,
Où enfin l'identité nationale a droit de cité,
Où pour toujours l'injustice perd ses quartiers,
Et où, des mains des bâtisseurs d'un monde radieux
Mûrissent partout les moissons de vœux patriotiques,
Brillent les soleils infinis de joie.

Refrain

Mossi lyrics

I
Burkĩmbã pĩnd n kisga wõrbo la yãnde hal yʋʋm tusri
B kisga fãadbã sẽn yi yɩɩga hal yʋʋm koabga, n wa ne yembdo,
B tõdga sɩlem-wɛɛgã sẽn toeeme, n lebg yaoolem yembdo
B kisga sɩlem-wɛɛgã yembdooh ne a tẽng-n-tɛɛndbã fãa gilli.
Wʋsg n bas raoodo, la kẽer me sɩd zãgsame,
La pãn-kongrã, la tõogrã, la tʋʋlgã kaagre,
Zɩɩmã raagre kenga d nin-buiidã pelse
La b paasa b raoodo n leb n zẽk b burkĩndi.

Reesgo I:
La yʋng a ye tãa, a ye tãa,
Kʋmba nin-buiidã vɩɩm kibare,
La yʋng a ye tãa bal pʋgẽ waa, tɩlgre sor pakame
Tɩ b rɩk n babsd vɩ-noogo,
Yʋng a ye lagma tõnd nin-buiidã
Ne nin-buiidã sẽn be dũni wã fãa pʋgẽ
N baood tɩlgre la paoongo, ne b sũurã fãa
Kall tɩ d tõoge, ba d na n ki d tẽng yĩnga!

English translation

I
Against the humiliating bondage of a thousand years
Rapacity came from afar to subjugate them for a hundred years.
Against the cynical malice in the shape
Of neo-colonialism and its little local servants.
Many gave in and certain others resisted.
But the frustrations, the successes, the sweat, the blood
Have fortified our courageous people
And fertilised its heroic struggle.

Chorus:
And one single night has drawn together
The history of an entire people,
And one single night has launched its triumphal march.
Towards the horizon of good fortune.
One single night has brought together our people
With all the peoples of the World,
In the acquisition of liberty and progress.
Fatherland or death, we shall conquer!

II
Nourished in the lively source of the Revolution,
The volunteers for liberty and peace
With their nocturnal and beneficial energies of the 4th of August
Had not only hand arms, but also and above all
The flame in their hearts lawfully to free
Faso forever from the fetters of those who
Here and there were polluting the sacred soul of
Independence and sovereignty.

Chorus

III
And seated henceforth in rediscovered dignity,
Love and honour partnered with humanity,
The people of Burkina sing a victory hymn
To the glory of the work of liberation and emancipation.
Down with exploitation of man by man!
Forward for the good of every man
By all men of today and tomorrow,
By every man here and always!

Chorus

IV
Popular revolution our nourishing sap.
Undying motherhood of progress in the face of man.
Eternal hearth of agreed democracy,
Where at last national identity has the right of freedom.
Where injustice has lost its place forever,
And where from the hands of builders of a glorious world
Everywhere the harvests of patriotic vows ripen,
Suns of boundless joy shine.

Chorus
