= Agriculture in Burkina Faso =

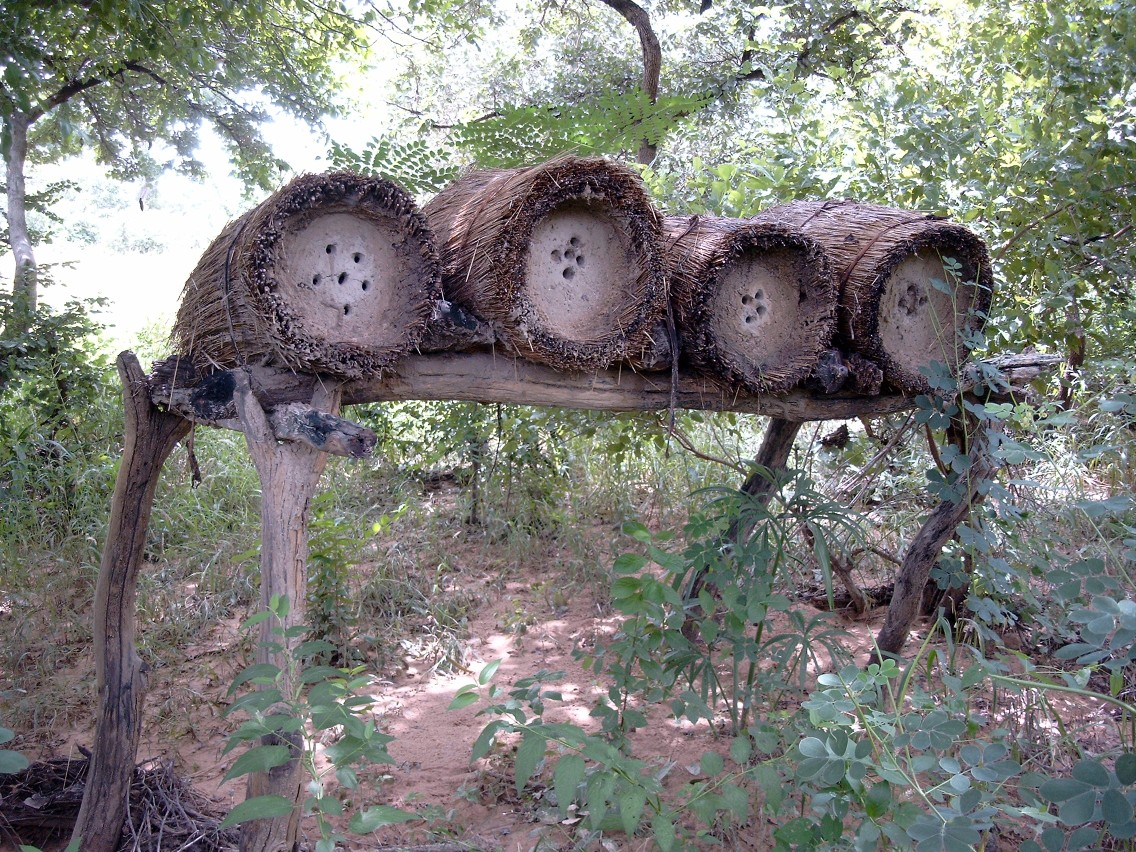
Beekeeping is part of the agricultural tradition of Burkina Faso.

Agriculture in Burkina Faso has tremendous potential.

Burkina Faso produced in 2018:

- 1.9 million tons of sorghum;
- 1.7 million tons of maize;
- 1.1 million tons of millet;
- 630 thousand tons of cowpea (3rd largest producer in the world, losing only to Niger and Nigeria);
- 490 thousand tons of sugar cane;
- 482 thousand tons of cotton;
- 329 thousand tons of peanut;
- 253 thousand tons of sesame seed (8th largest producer in the world);
- 240 thousand tons of vegetable;
- 160 thousand tons of rice;
- 103 thousand tons of cashew nuts (12th largest producer in the world);

In addition to smaller productions of other agricultural products.
