= Pierre Englebert =

American political scientist

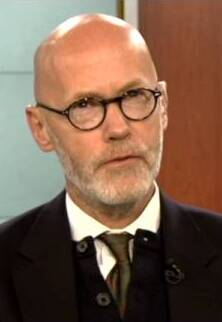
Englebert in 2016

Pierre Englebert is an American political scientist who specializes in the politics of Francophone Africa and Central Africa. He is the H. Russell Smith Professor of International Relations and Professor of Politics at Pomona College in Claremont, California. He previously worked at the World Bank in West Africa. Underlining much of Englebert's work are his arguments on how externally granted (de iure) sovereignty is used as a resource by African elites, who then redistribute state positions through patron-client relationships. This is an extension of the existing "neopatrimonialism" theory of African politics.
