= Popular Revolutionary Tribunal =

Public trials aimed at political retribution in Sunkara-era Burkina Faso

The Popular Revolutionary Tribunals (French: Tribunaux populaires de la Révolution, TPR, alternatively the People's Revolutionary Tribunals) were a system of courts, through which the workers and peasants of Burkina Faso were intended to be able to participate in and monitor the trials of criminals in the new Marxist–Leninist and pan-Africanist government of Thomas Sankara and his National Council for the Revolution. Among these were members of the previous government, corrupt officials, "lazy workers", and supposed counter-revolutionaries.

Sankara came to power in what was then the Republic of Upper Volta through a military coup in 1983, and immediately set about to transform society through what he dubbed the "Democratic and Popular Revolution" (French: Révolution démocratique et populaire). The Popular Revolutionary Tribunals, formed in October 1983, were inspired by a number of historical predecessors, among them the Revolutionary Tribunal of the French Revolution and the "revtribunals" of the October Revolution, along with their equivalents during the Cuban Revolution, as well as more directly by the contemporary people's courts established by Jerry Rawlings in Ghana. Another important tool of the Burkinabé attempt at a social revolution was the Committees for the Defense of the Revolution (French: Comités de Défense de la Révolution). The TPRs were made up of magistrates, soldiers, and members of the Committees.

The tribunals, which have been alleged to have been only show trials, were intended to be held very openly with oversight from the public. Despite this, some of the trials are said to have been held in secret. The TPRs were initially popular with the people, but became heavy-handed and inefficient. Sankara himself self-critically admitted that the tribunals often were used as occasions to settle private scores, rather than deal revolutionary justice.

Among those tried by the Popular Revolutionary Tribunals was Colonel Saye Zerbo, military ruler and President of Upper Volta between 1980 and 1982, who was sentenced to 15 years in prison in May 1984 but released already in August 1985. His conviction would later be annulled on 18 February 1997 by the supreme court of Burkina Faso.

The Popular Revolutionary Tribunals, along with the Committees for the Defense of the Revolution, were abolished in 1987 after Thomas Sankara's death at the hands of a military coup led by Blaise Compaoré, his former friend and colleague. Compaoré would go on to rule Burkina Faso for 27 years, until his overthrow during the 2014 Burkinabé uprising.

== See also ==
- History of Burkina Faso
- Law enforcement in Burkina Faso
- Revolutionary terror
- Sankarism
