= Valère Somé =

Politician

Valère Dieudonné Somé (17 October 1950 – 30 May 2017) was a politician and scholar from Burkina Faso. Somé was the leader of the Union of Communist Struggles - Reconstructed (ULC-R) during the 1980s. He was an Anthropo-Economist, and headed research at the INSS-CNRST.

== Biography ==
Entering the revolutionary process of 1983 with the support from the student movement, Somé came to play an important role in the political life of the country during the rule of the Revolutionary National Council led by Thomas Sankara. Somé and another ULC-R leader, Basile Guissou, largely functioned as the 'ideologues' of the revolutionary government.

In January 1985 ULC-R won the elections in the University of Ouagadougou Committee for the Defense of the Revolution. But another faction, the Union of Burkinabè Communists (UCB), controlled the university administration through the principal Clément Oumarou Ouedraogo. On 29 August 1986 Somé was named Minister of Higher Education and Research. As a result, from the ULC-R/UCB rivalry at the university, the university CDR committee was disbanded on 1 September 1986. Somé faced criticism from within his own organization after taking charge as Minister.

On 9 September 1987 a new government was formed, without Somé. Later the same month, Sankara gave Somé the task of drafting a programme for the unification of the different revolutionary organizations. After the overthrow and assassination of Sankara in 1987, Somé went into exile in Congo-Brazzaville for a period.

In 1989 Somé formed the Party for Social Democracy (PDS) along with other former ULC-R members who had refused to merge with the Organization for Popular Democracy - Labour Movement. In January 1995 PDS and other parties merged into the Party for Unified Social Democracy (PDSU), with Somé as its leader.

Somé completed his doctoral thesis in 1996.

On 21 May 2000, Somé's party merged into the Sankarist Pan-African Convention (CPS). Somé became general secretary of the CPS. He later founded a new party, the Convergence for Social Democracy (CDS). In October 2004 he was replaced by Djéjouma Sanon as the leader of CDS.

Somé died on 30 May 2017 in France at the age of 66.

== Bibliography ==
- Somé, Valère D. Thomas Sankara, l'espoir assassiné. Paris: l'Harmattan, 1990.
