= Amirou Thiombiano =

Upper Voltan politician

Amirou Thiombiano was an Upper Voltan politician. He was the son and heir of the traditional monarch of Gourma, youth but came to reject feudalism during his youth. As a student in Dakar he came in contact with Senegalese students belonging to the communist African Independence Party (PAI). He joined the party, and on August 13, 1963 he founded the Voltan Section of PAI. He would serve as the general secretary of the underground PAI in Upper Volta. Back in Upper Volta, Thiombiano worked as a Divisional Customs Inspector. On April 3, 1974 a Council of Ministers meeting appointed Thiombiano as the new Directors of Customs.

Thiombiano unexpectedly died in Fada N'Gourma on March 13, 1975 after falling ill. He was buried in Fada N'Gourma.
