= Committees for the Defense of the Revolution (Burkina Faso) =

System of local revolutionary cells, established in Burkina Faso by Thomas Sankara

- Comités de Défense de la Révolution

Agency overview
- Formed: 1983
- Dissolved: 1987
- Jurisdiction: Republic of Upper Volta/Burkina Faso
- Headquarters: Ouagadougou
- Employees: ▲2.900.000 (1986)

The Committees for the Defense of the Revolution (French: Comités de Défense de la Révolution, CDRs) were systems of local revolutionary cells, established in Burkina Faso by the Marxist-Leninist and pan-Africanist leader Thomas Sankara, President of the country from 1983 until his assassination in 1987. Committees were established in each workplace. They were inspired by the Committees for the Defense of the Revolution in Cuba, and functioned as "organs of political and social control."

== History ==
Two decades after decolonization from France, the Republic of Upper Volta had suffered numerous military regimes and uprisings (primarily led by the strong trade unionist movement). In 1982, Major Dr. Jean-Baptiste Ouédraogo overthrew the government of Colonel Saye Zerbo, instituting the rule of the Council of Popular Salvation (CSP). Factional infighting developed between moderates in the CSP and the radicals, led by Captain Thomas Sankara, a war veteran who was appointed prime minister in January 1983.

Sankara was arrested soon afterwards, which triggered a coup on 4 August 1983 organized by among others Captain Blaise Compaoré. Sankara was released, and made president. The National Council for the Revolution (CNR) was formed to rule the country. Within short he began implementing a radical programme of social, cultural, economic and political reform, which he dubbed the "Democratic and Popular Revolution" (French: Révolution démocratique et populaire, or RDP).

The policies enacted by Sankara included the abolition of tribal chiefs' privileges, heavy advances in women's rights, anti-HIV/AIDS efforts, anti-corruption campaigns, a foreign policy based on anti-imperialism, land redistribution from feudal landlords to the peasantry, mass vaccinations of children, a nationwide literacy campaign, the promotion of reforestation, and so on. Upper Volta was renamed Burkina Faso, to promote a new national identity. In order to achieve this radical transformation of society, he increasingly exerted government control over the nation, eventually banning trade unions and the independent press. Corrupt officials, "lazy workers" and supposed counter-revolutionaries were tried publicly in the Popular Revolutionary Tribunals (French: Tribunaux populaires de la Révolution, TPRs).

One primary tool of implementing the "Democratic and Popular Revolution" was the Committees for the Defense of the Revolution. They were formed in 1983, having been mentioned in Sankara's first speech following the coup – he called on "the Voltaic people to form Committees for the Defense of the Revolution everywhere in order to fully participate in the CNR's great patriotic struggle and to prevent our enemies here and abroad from harming our people." Sankara, heavily inspired by Che Guevara and the Cuban Revolution, modelled them after the Comités de Defensa de la Revolución of Cuba, a network of neighbourhood committees across the island. Formed by Fidel Castro in 1960, they were dubbed by Castro a "collective system of revolutionary vigilance".

The Burkinabé CDRs, however, took a wider approach – Sankara intended them to serve as a new foundation of society, a platform for popular mobilization which would revolutionize life in Burkina Faso and restructure its social space on a local level. This goal of restructuring the basic functions of society was carried out by the Committees for the Defense of the Revolution through attempting to mobilize the masses, and to carry out political education. Involving the people in governance was also portrayed as "the best way to avoid the army seizing power for itself", and as such the CDRs were endowed with administrative, economic and judicial responsibilities.

Some have viewed the Committees for the Defense of the Revolution far less benevolently, enacting thuggery rather than social revolution. It has been alleged that the CDRs were formed to intimidate and weaken the trade unions as well as other established interest groups. The Ugandan Catholic priest Emmanuel Katongole has written that the CDRs operated as "administrative tentacles and vigilante groups rather than incubators or exemplars of what a genuinely transformed new society might look like." Others have described the CDRs as slowly falling into such activities rather than being formed for them, deteriorating from popular mass organizations into gangs of armed thugs which clashed with trade unionists.

In Ghana, ruled by the Provisional National Defence Council (PNDC), the military junta led by Flight Lieutenant Jerry Rawlings, groups likewise dubbed the Committees for the Defense of the Revolution were instituted on 31 December 1984, possibly inspired by the Burkinabé variant of the name. These were intended to "act as watchdogs against corruption", and replaced the previous People's and Workers' Defence Committees. Rawlings, a close friend of Thomas Sankara, would eventually adopt conservative and right-wing policies rather than radical left-wing such.

On 15 October 1987 Sankara was killed by a group of military officers, in a coup d'état organised by his former colleague and friend, Blaise Compaoré. Despite knowledge of the revolutionary's death spreading, some CDRs mounted an armed resistance to the army for several days. Compaoré, who would go on to rule Burkina Faso for almost three decades before being ousted from power by the 2014 Burkinabé uprising (at least partially inspired by Thomas Sankara), immediately set out to reverse most of the reforms made in the name of the "Democratic and Popular Revolution". Among other changes, the Committees for the Defense of the Revolution were quickly abolished.

Laabal Brigade
- Brigade Laabal

Agency overview
- Formed: June 18, 2025
- Jurisdiction: Burkina Faso
- Headquarters: Ouagadougou

On June 18, 2025 Burkinabe President Ibrahim Traoré adopted a similar idea called The Laabal Brigade. The term "Laabal" meaning uprightness and integrity in the Fula language. The goal is to empower citizens and instill a culture of discipline, particularly in matters of urban sanitation and health, respect for public authority, Public order and tranquility, road safety, cleanliness and maintenance of collective spaces.

== See also ==
- 2014 Burkinabé uprising
- History of Burkina Faso
- Sankarism
- Mass movement
- Social revolution
- Valère Somé
