= Burkinabé Trade Union Confederation =

Trade confederation in Burkina Faso

CSB
- Trade Union Confederation of Burkina
- Confédération Syndicale Burkinabé
- Headquarters: Ouagadougou, Burkina Faso
- Location: Burkina Faso
- Key people: Jean-Mathias Liliou, secretary general
- Affiliations: ITUC

The Burkinabé Trade Union Confederation (CSB) is a trade union centre in Burkina Faso. It is affiliated with the International Trade Union Confederation.
