= List of coups and coup attempts =

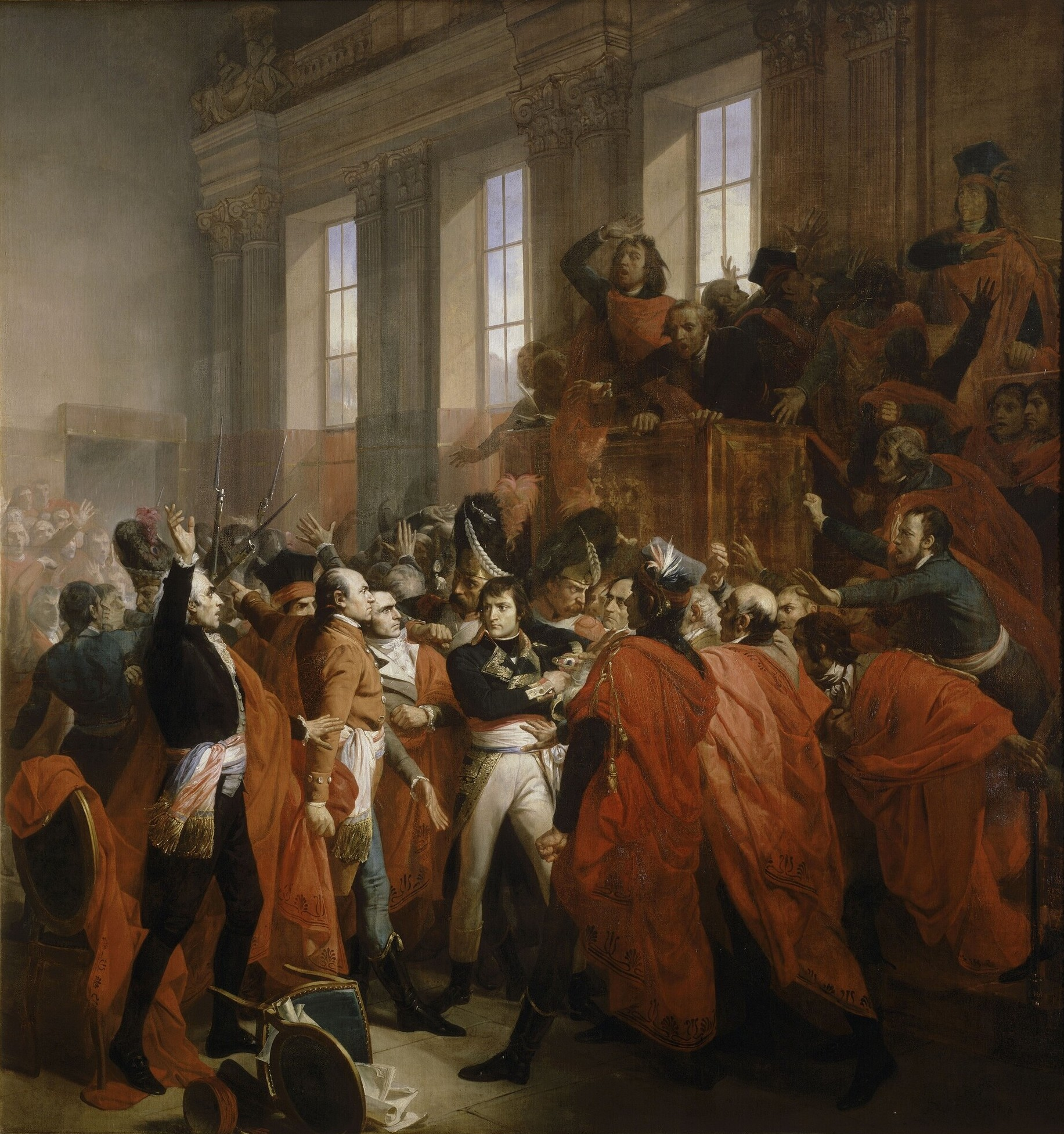
General Bonaparte during the coup d'état of 18 Brumaire in Saint-Cloud. Bonaparte at the Council of Five Hundred at Saint-Cloud by François Bouchot, 1840

A coup d'état, often abbreviated to coup, is the overthrow of a lawful government through illegal means. If force or violence are not involved, such an event is sometimes called a soft or bloodless coup. In another variation known as a self-coup, a ruler who came to power through legal means may try to stay in power through illegal means, thus preventing the next legal ruler from taking power. This is a chronological list of such coups and coup attempts, from ancient times to the present.

== BC ==
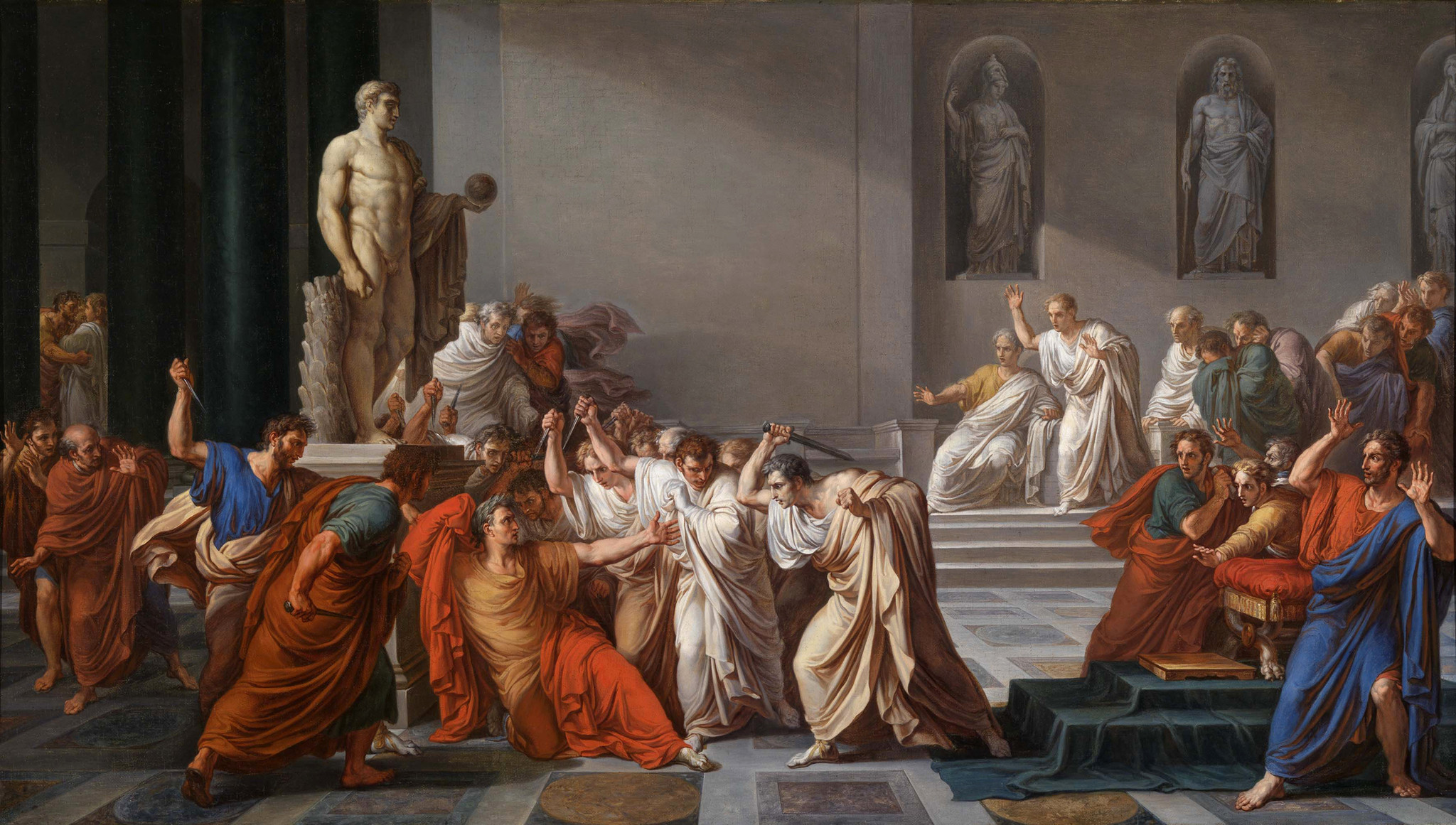
The assassination of Julius Caesar (44 BC), as depicted by Vincenzo Camuccini

- 1155, Ancient Egypt: Pharaoh Ramesses III was assassinated in a conspiracy led by Tiye, one of his secondary wives, to place her son Pentawer on the throne. The plot failed, and Ramesses IV, his son with Queen Tyti, succeeded him.
- 876, Kingdom of Israel: Zimri, a military commander of Israel, killed King Elah and became king himself. Soon after, he committed suicide to avoid being overthrown by his own commander, Omri.
- 860, Qi coup d'état of 860 BC in Qi: Duke Hu of Qi was overthrown by his half-brother Shan.
- 841, Kingdom of Israel: Jehu killed Jehoram of Israel and Ahaziah of Judah, and became king of Israel.
- 730, Kingdom of Judah: There was a failed coup attempt by Rezin of Aram-Damascus and Pekah of Israel to try to overthrow Ahaz of Judah and the House of David and to replace him with Ben Tav'el.
- 716, Lydia: King Candaules of Lydia was killed by his bodyguard, Gyges, who then assumed the throne, having conspired with Candaules's wife.
- 632, Athens: A coup attempt failed in Athens, by Cylon who attempted to establish himself as a tyrant.
- 522, Murder of the Magi in the Achaemenid Empire: Bardiya was assassinated in a conspiracy led by Otanes, leading to the accession of Darius the Great of the Achaemenid dynasty.
- 509, Rome: Members of the Tarquin dynasty led by Lucius Junius Brutus overthrew King of Rome Lucius Tarquinius Superbus and established the Roman Republic.
- 411, Athens: A coup at Athens, led by Antiphon, established a short-lived oligarchy known as The Four Hundred.
- 404, Athens: A coup at Athens, led by Critias, established the short-lived pro-Spartan oligarchy known as the Thirty Tyrants.
- 209, Xiongnu Empire: The Xiongnu Emperor Modu Chanyu overthrew his father Touman and killed his rival half-brother.
- 185, Maurya Empire: There was a coup in the Maurya Empire, which controlled much of present Indian territory, by Mauryan General Pushyamitra Shunga.
- 88, Rome: Lucius Cornelius Sulla occupied Rome and outlawed his enemy, Gaius Marius.
- 82, Rome: In Sulla's civil war, Sulla again marched on Rome, removed Gaius Marius the Younger, and proclaimed himself as Roman dictator.
- 63, Rome: In the Catiline conspiracy, Lucius Sergius Catilina plotted to overthrow the consulship of Marcus Tullius Cicero and Gaius Antonius Hybrida, but the plan was discovered.
- 49, Rome: Julius Caesar, heading part of the Roman army, illegally crossed the Rubicon and marched on Rome. After assuming control of government, he was proclaimed "dictator in perpetuity".
- 44, Rome: On the Ides of March, Julius Caesar was assassinated by members of the Roman Senate. The conspirators did not gain control of the Roman Republic, instead, power eventually passed to the Second Triumvirate of Caesar supporters.

== 1–999 ==
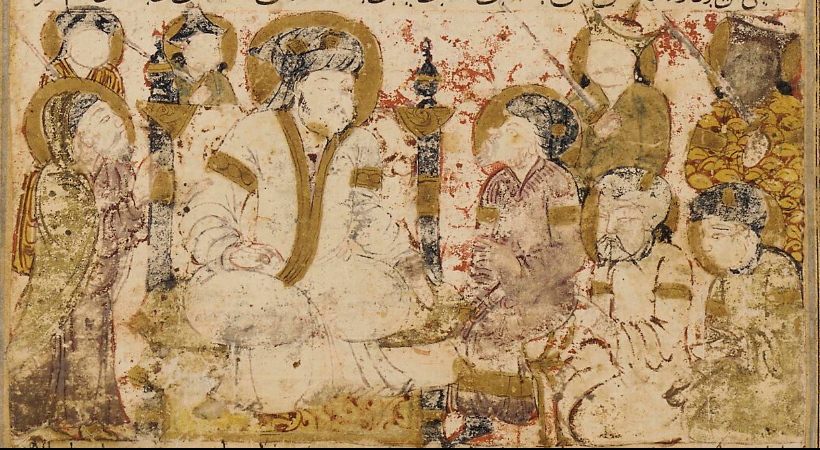
As-Saffah is proclaimed as the first Abbasid caliph, from Balami's Tarikhnama

- 41, Rome: Roman Emperor Caligula was assassinated as a result of a conspiracy by officers of the Praetorian Guard, senators, and courtiers, though the conspirators' attempt to use the opportunity to restore the Roman Republic was thwarted.
- 65, Pisonian conspiracy in Rome: Gaius Calpurnius Piso plotted to have Roman Emperor Nero assassinated, but the plan was discovered.
- 69, Rome: Following Roman Emperor Nero's death, several complots lead to the year of the Four Emperors.
- 189, Eastern Han dynasty (China): The Ten Eunuchs of Later Han dynasty were murdered by troops led by Yuan Shao and Yuan Shu; Dong Zhuo took over the government by force.
- 249, Incident at Gaoping Tombs in Cao Wei (China): Cao Shuang was captured and executed by the Sima house (Sima Yi, Sima Zhao, and Sima Shi).
- 378, Tikal: King Chak Tok Ich'aak of Tikal was assassinated in a Teotihuacan-backed coup.
- 498, Yamato Province: Ōomi Heguri no Matori usurped Yamato Japan's government upon the death of the Ōkimi (Great Chieftain, now known as Emperor) Ninken. Matori was killed by Otomo no Kanamura.
- 552, Rouran Khaganate: Bumin Qaghan overthrew the Rouran Khaganate and declared the Turkic Khaganate.
- 602, Byzantine Empire: Maurice, Emperor of the Byzantine Empire, was deposed by a conspiracy of the Balkan army, which was led by a Thracian junior officer named Flavius Phocas and Maurice's seven sons. Most of the pro-Maurice government officials and generals were executed along with him (excepting Priscus and Philippicus), and Phocas was acclaimed emperor in the church of St. John the Baptist.
- 610, Heraclian revolt in the Byzantine Empire: The same Phocas who had deposed Maurice eight years earlier was deposed by a conspiracy led by the generals Priscus, his son-in-law, and Heraclius the Elder, the governor of north Africa. The exarch's son, Heraclius the Younger, deposed Phocas with the help of his cousin Niketas.
- 626, Xuanwu Gate Incident in the Tang Empire (China): On 2 July, Prince Li Shimin and his close followers killed Crown Prince Li Jiancheng and Prince Li Yuanji before taking complete control of the Tang government from Emperor Gaozu.
- 642, Goguryeo: Yŏn Kaesomun of Goguryeo led a military coup that killed King Yeongryu and installed King Bojang as a puppet under military rule.
- 680, Visigothic Kingdom: King Wamba of the Visigoths was drugged, tonsured, and dressed in a monk's cloak, so he would be considered an ordained man and hence he could not reign.
- 717, Second Turkic Khaganate: Inel Qaghan of Second Turkic Khaganate was dethroned and later killed by Bilge Kaghan's brother Kül Tigin.
- 742, Second Turkic Khaganate: Ashina Shi usurped the Second Turkic Khaganate throne after killing three of his rivals.
- 751, Umayyad Caliphate: Abu Muslim Khorasani stormed Damascus and massacred the ruling Banu Umayyad family. As-Saffah became the first ruler of the Abbasid Caliphate.
- 767, Duchy of Rome: Amidst the political turmoil of the Frankish-Byzantine rivalry for control over the Papacy, Pope Paul I contracted a fatal illness and died on June 28. Before a successor could be chosen, Roman nobles led by Toto of Nepi launched a military coup, installing Toto's brother as Antipope Constantine II.
- 839, Silla: Chang Pogo of Silla overthrew King Minae and installed King Sinmu on the throne.

== 1000–1699 ==
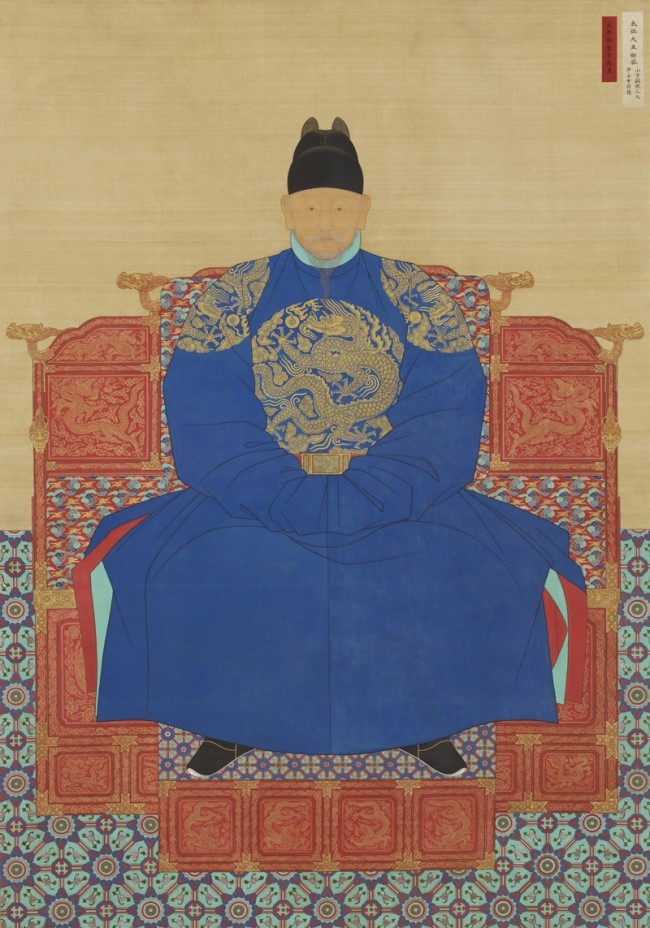
General Yi Seong-gye, later crowned Taejo of Joseon

- 1010, Goryeo: General Kang Cho of Goryeo staged a coup that overthrew King Mokjong.
- 1126, Goryeo: Yi Cha-gyŏm of Goryeo made a failed attempt to overthrow King Injong.
- 1170, Goryeo: General Chŏng Chung-bu of Goryeo led a military coup that deposed King Uijong and installed puppet king Myeongjong under military regime.
- 1197, Goryeo: Ch'oe Ch'ung-hŏn of Goryeo staged a military coup that ousted and killed military dictator Yi Ŭi-min, and deposed King Myeongjong.
- 1240, Ayyubid Sultanate of Egypt: As-Salih Ayyub overthrew his brother Al-Adil II in a palace coup, imprisoning him and seizing the throne.
- 1250, Ayyubid Sultanate of Egypt: A group of Mamluk officers, led by Baybars, rebelled against Ayyubid rule, killing Sultan Al-Muazzam Turanshah and establishing the Mamluk Sultanate.
- 1258, Goryeo: General Kim Chun of Goryeo overthrew and killed then-military dictator Ch'oe Ŭi.
- 1259, Mamluk Sultanate of Egypt: Sayf ad-Din Qutuz deposed the infant Sultan Al-Mansur Ali in a coup, establishing himself as ruler of Egypt.
- 1284, Ilkhanate: The Ilkhanate ruler Tekuder was overthrown by Arghun.
- 1290, Khalji Revolution in the Delhi Sultanate: Jalal-ud-Din Khalji led a coup that murdered the last Mamluk ruler, Qaiqabad, starting the Khalji dynasty.
- 1296, Delhi Sultanate: Alauddin Khalji usurped the Delhi throne after ordering the assassination of his uncle, Jalal-ud-Din Khalji, and deposing the rightful heir, Ruknuddin Ibrahim.
- 1320, Delhi Sultanate: On 9 July, a group of conspirators committed the regicide of Sultan Mubarak Shah, the last Khalji ruler. A conspirator named Khusrau Khan then seized the throne, but was soon overthrown by Tughlaq's revolt.
- 1327, England: Isabella of France overthrew her husband, Edward II, and became regent for their son, Edward III, with her lover and co-regent, Roger Mortimer.
- 1330, England: Edward III assumed royal power, arrested Isabella of France and executed Roger Mortimer.
- 1388, Goryeo: General Yi Sŏng-gye of Goryeo led a military coup that deposed King U, murdered General Ch'oe Yŏng, and installed puppet ruler King Chang and eventually King Gongyang. Yi later crowned himself, starting the Joseon dynasty.
- 1452, Aq Qoyunlu: Uzun Hasan seized Diyarbakir in a coup while sultan Jahangir was away on a military expedition.
- 1398, Joseon dynasty (Korea): Prince Yi Pangwŏn of Joseon led a coup that murdered Prime Minister Chŏng Tojŏn and two other princes.
- 1455, Joseon dynasty (Korea): Grand Prince Suyang of Joseon led a coup that ousted the government of Prime Minister Hwangbo In and Kim Chongsŏ, who were killed during the coup.
- 1459, Đại Việt: Prince Lê Nghi Dân led a coup that killed Emperor Lê Nhân Tông. Lê Nghi Dân later crowned himself.
- 1459, Đại Việt: Đỗ Bí and Lê Thụ led a coup that overthrew Emperor Lê Nghi Dân.
- 1506, Joseon dynasty (Korea): A coup d'état in Joseon overthrew Prince Yeonsan and placed King Jungjong on the throne.
- 1512, Ottoman Empire: Selim I rebelled against his father Bayezid II and took the throne of the Ottoman Empire.
- 1541, Peru: Juan de Rada led a coup that ousted and killed Spanish conquistador and governor of Peru, Francisco Pizarro, and installed Diego de Almagro II as governor.
- 1567, Scotland: Protestant rebels arrested Mary Queen of Scots and forced her to sign the Abdicate on 24 July 1567 in favour of the infant James VI and to appoint her illegitimate half-brother, James Stewart, 1st Earl of Moray, as regent.
- 1569, 1569 Plot in Sweden: Courtiers of the imprisoned Eric XIV attempted to free and reinstate him, deposing John III of Sweden. The plot was exposed and prevented, and the conspirators were executed.
- 1574, Mornay Plot in Sweden: A plot to depose John III of Sweden and reinstate Eric XIV was discovered in Sweden.
- 1605, Gunpowder Plot in England: On 5 November, a group of provincial English Catholics led by Guy Fawkes attempted to kill King James I and much of the Protestant aristocracy by blowing up the Houses of Parliament during the State Opening of Parliament.
- 1622, Janissaries' Revolt in the Ottoman Empire: Janissaries revolted against Osman II and imprisoned him in the Seven Towers. He was murdered shortly afterwards.
- 1623, Joseon dynasty (Korea): A coup d'état in Joseon overthrew Prince Gwanghae and placed King Injo on the throne.
- 1626, Mughal Empire: General Mahabat Khan revolted against Emperor Jahangir and kidnapped him, but the coup attempt was ultimately foiled by Nur Jahan.
- 1648, Pride's Purge in England: Members of Parliament who wished to continue political negotiations with Charles I were ejected from the House of Commons. Those remaining—known as the Rump—went on to agree that the king should be put on trial for his life.
- 1653, England: On 20 April, Oliver Cromwell and forty musketeers under the command of Charles Worsley entered the House of Commons and forcibly dissolved the Rump Parliament, leading to Cromwell becoming Lord Protector and instigating military rule.
- 1660, Denmark: Frederick III of Denmark staged a coup in Copenhagen that instituted absolute monarchy in the country.
- 1670: Magnate conspiracy
- 1687, Kolomak coup in the Cossack Hetmanate: Hetman Ivan Samoylovych was deposed and imprisoned by a successful conspiracy. The conspirators elected Ivan Mazepa as the new leader of the Cossacks.
- 1688, Glorious Revolution in the British Isles: The Catholic James II was deposed by a faction favourable to the Protestant William of Orange.
- 1689, Boston Revolt in the Dominion of New England: In an action described by some as a "putsch", the Puritan militia, assisted by a Bostonian mob, arrested the unpopular governor, Sir Edmund Andros.

== 1700–1799 ==
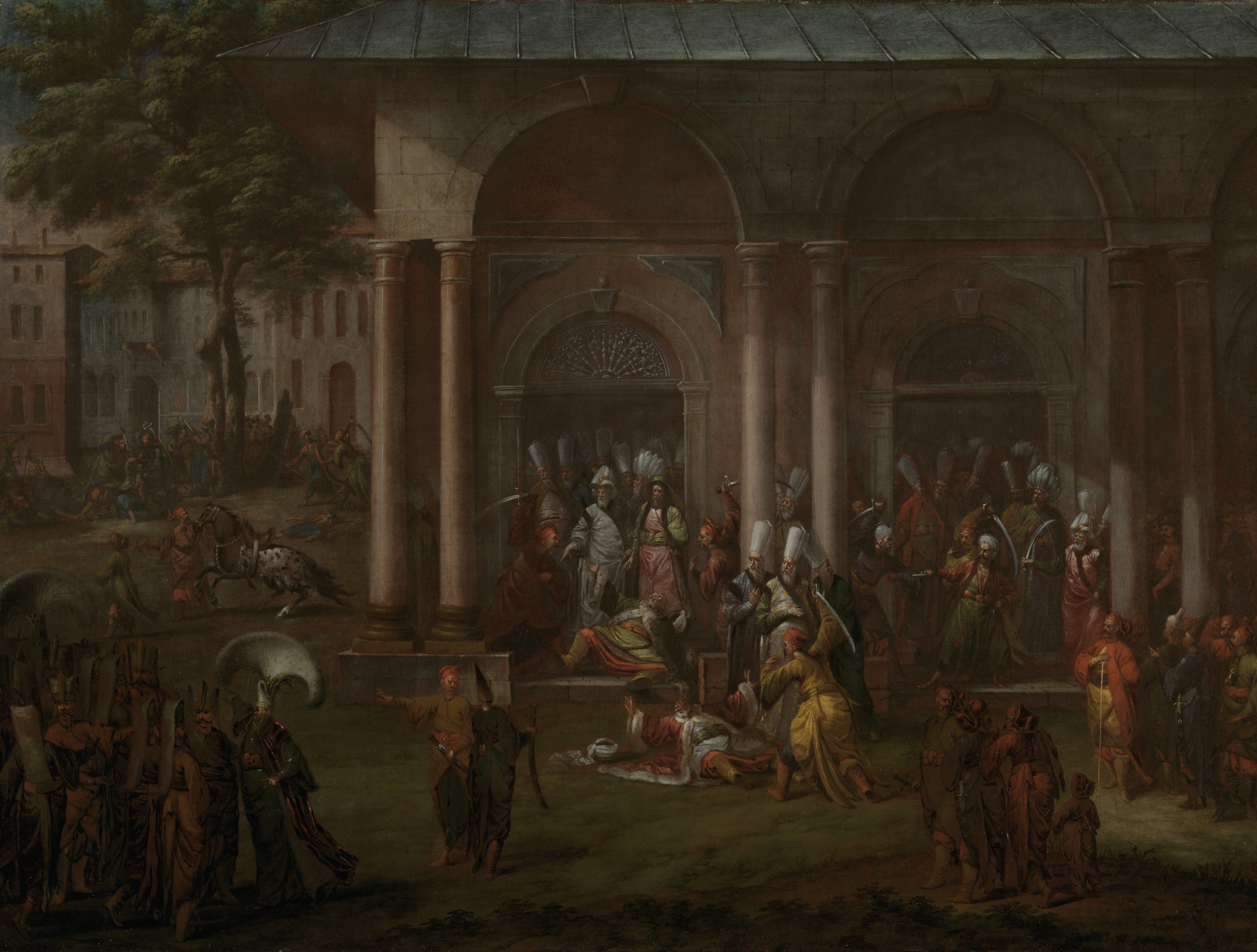
Patrona Halil rebellion; painting by Jean Baptiste Vanmour

- 1703, Ottoman Empire: A Janissary revolt began following the Treaty of Karlowitz, in which Mustafa II was deposed, which is known as Edirne event.
- 1711, 1711 Karamanli coup in the Ottoman Tripolitania
- 1719, Mughal Empire: The Sayyid brothers led a coup that deposed and executed Emperor Farrukhsiyar, placing Rafi ud-Darajat on the throne.
- 1719, Revolution of 1719 in South Carolina
- 1730, Ottoman Empire: Janissary Patrona Halil instigated an uprising which resulted in the deposition of Ahmed III and the end of the Tulip era.
- 1756, Coup of 1756 in Sweden: Louisa Ulrika of Prussia, Queen of Sweden, attempted to abolish the rule of the Riksdag of the Estates and reinstate absolute monarchy in Sweden. The plot was exposed and subdued shortly before it was intended to begin.
- 1762, Russia: A coup by Catherine the Great forced the abdication of Peter III of Russia.
- 1769, Ethiopia: Ras Mikael Sehul deposed and killed Emperor Iyoas I of Ethiopia in a demonstration of power over the Ethiopian Throne. This action ushered in the Zemene Mesafint ("Era of the Princes"), a lengthy period of civil war and chaos in Ethiopia.
- 1772, Denmark–Norway: A coup led by Juliana Maria of Brunswick-Wolfenbüttel and her son Frederick, Hereditary Prince of Denmark and Norway deposed the ruling cabinet minister Johann Friedrich Struensee.
- 1772, Revolution of 1772 in Sweden: King Gustav III performed a coup to introduce absolute monarchy against the Riksdag of the Estates, resulting in the end of the Age of Liberty and the introduction of the Swedish Constitution of 1772.
- 1774, Nana Fadnavis, along with 11 other influential Sardars of the Maratha Empire, formed the Barbhai Counsil and overthrew Peshwa Raghunath Rao, who had seized the throne after killing his own nephew, Narayanrao. After his removal, Nana Fadnavis proclaimed 40-day-old son of Narayanrao, Madhavrao II as the next Peshwa, with himself acting as regent.
- 1781: Conspiracy of the three Antonios
- 1783: Newburgh Conspiracy
- 1784, Denmark–Norway: A coup is performed by the crown prince Frederick VI of Denmark against the ruling cabinet led by Ove Høegh-Guldberg.
- 1786: Shays' Rebellion
- 1789, 1789 Conspiracy in Sweden: An attempted coup, with the purpose of deposing Gustav III of Sweden, was thwarted.
- 1791, Poland: A political coup compelled the Polish diet to adopt a new constitution.
- 1793, Armfelt Conspiracy in Sweden: A coup by Gustaf Mauritz Armfelt, in companionship with Magdalena Rudenschöld, with the intent to depose the guardian government of Gustav IV Adolf of Sweden, was exposed.
- 1794, Fall of Maximilien Robespierre (also called the Coup d'état of 9 Thermidor) in France: Members of the Committee of Public Safety arrested and executed fellow Committee member Maximilien Robespierre.
- 1797, Coup of 18 Fructidor in France: The French Directory, with the support of the military, seizes power and ends the monarchist majority in Parliament.
- 1799, Coup of 18 Brumaire in France: A bloodless coup d'état overthrew the French Directory, replacing it with the French Consulate, and brought Napoléon Bonaparte to power.
- 1799: Conspiracy of the Machetes

== 1800–1899 ==
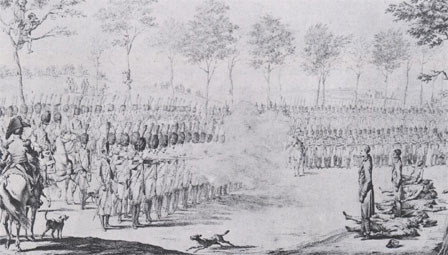
Execution of Claude François de Malet and his co-conspirators on 29 October 1812 following the Malet coup in France

=== 1800 ===
- Switzerland: During the Napoleonic era and French Revolutionary Wars, there were four coups in the Helvetic Republic between 1800 and 1802.

=== 1804 ===
- Pichegru Conspiracy in France: a failed plot against Napoleonic Consulate

=== 1807 ===
- Ottoman coups of 1807–1808
- Burr conspiracy

=== 1808 ===
- Mexico: Gabriel J. de Yermo overthrew the viceroy of New Spain José de Iturrigaray
- Rum Rebellion in New South Wales: A coup d'état by the New South Wales Corps deposed Governor William Bligh.

=== 1809 ===
- Mutiny of Álzaga in Argentina: a failed attempt by Martín de Álzaga to overthrow the viceroy of the Río de la Plata Santiago de Liniers
- Coup of 1809 in Sweden: Several army officers deposed King Gustav IV Adolf of Sweden while an army was marching on Stockholm.
- Revolution of 1809 in Iceland: Danish adventurer Jørgen Jørgensen arrested the governor of Iceland and made himself protector, declaring the country independent from Denmark. Two months later, English warship HMS Talbot arrived and restored Danish rule.

=== 1811 ===
- Figueroa mutiny
- Chile: José Miguel Carrera first coup d'état (4 September 1811). Known as the first successful coup d'état in the history of Chile.

=== 1812 ===
- Revolution of 8 October 1812 in Argentina
- Malet coup of 1812 in France: Republican General Claude François de Malet led a coup against Emperor Napoleon I.

=== 1815 ===
- France: Emperor Napoleon I staged a coup against King Louis XVIII of France, retaking his throne as Emperor of the French during the Hundred Days.
- Spain: Juan Díaz Porlier, with the support of the bourgeoisie and educated class, pronounced against King Ferdinand VII but was later betrayed.

=== 1820 ===
- Spain: A pronunciamiento by liberal Rafael del Riego forced the restoration of the Spanish Constitution of 1812, and began the Trienio Liberal.

=== 1822 ===
- Mutiny of Pío Marcha in Mexico: a popular pronunciamiento by Sergeant Pío Marcha proclaims Agustín de Iturbide as Emperor
- July 1822 Spanish coup d'état: The Royal Guard attempted an absolutist coup against King Ferdinand VII, which failed.

=== 1823 ===
- Balconcillo mutiny in Peru: The Peruvian military overthrew the Supreme Governing Junta, bringing José de la Riva Agüero to power.
- Casa Mata Plan Revolution in Mexico: Agustín de Iturbide presents his abdication and the First Mexican Empire ends as a result of a republican coup led by Antonio López de Santa Anna
- Costa Rica: Joaquín de Oreamuno overthrew Rafael Francisco Osejo and declared the joining of Costa Rica to the First Mexican Empire, but fails because of his defeat in the Battle of Ochomogo.

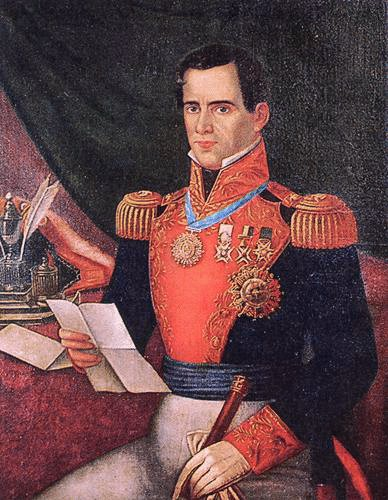
The caudillo Antonio López de Santa Anna was involved in several coups in early post-independence Mexico.

=== 1824 ===
- April Revolt in Portugal

=== 1825 ===
- Decembrist revolt in Russia: Failed coup attempt against Emperor Nicholas I by the secret Northern Society of the Decembrists during the Russian interregnum of 1825.

=== 1827 ===
- 1827 Honduran coup d'état: Dionisio de Herrera is overthrown by José Justo Milla and is imprisoned in Guatemala.
- Mexico: Vice President Nicolás Bravo rebelled against Yorkinos, but fails to overthrow the first Mexican President Guadalupe Victoria

=== 1828 ===
- Chuquisaca Mutiny in Bolivia: Military revolt in Chuquisaca wounded President Antonio José de Sucre, leading to his resignation.
- Decembrist revolution (Argentina): Unitarian Juan Lavalle deposed and executed federalist Manuel Dorrego as governor of Buenos Aires.
- Septembrine Conspiracy
- Palmero Conspiracy
- Mutiny of La Acordada in Mexico: Successful riots against the 1828 Mexican elections and its winner Manuel Gómez Pedraza, resulting in its nullification and the rise to power of Vicente Guerrero

=== 1829 ===
- Bolivia: On the eve of New Year's Day, President Pedro Blanco Soto was arrested and soon killed in a coup led by Colonel José Ballivián.
- Mexico: Anastasio Bustamante overthrew and murdered President Vicente Guerrero.

=== 1832 ===
- 1832 Georgian plot in Russian Empire
- 1832 Brazilian coup d'état attempt: a failed coup launched by Minister Diogo Feijó to suspend the Brazilian Constitution of 1824 and impose the so-called Pouso Alegre Constitution.
- Plan of Veracruz in Mexico: President Anastasio Bustamante was deposed for the first time by Antonio López de Santa Anna, and replaced by Melchor Múzquiz.

=== 1834 ===
- Plan of Cuernavaca in Mexico: With the support of the Mexican Army and clergy, President Santa Anna performs a self-coup in which he declares himself dictator, dissolves congress and ends Valentín Gómez Farías' progressive reforms. This event culminated in Mexico's transition from a federal republic to a centralist system.

=== 1836 ===
- Belenzada in Portugal

=== 1837 ===
- Revolt of the Marshals in Portugal

=== 1839 ===
- Bolivia: José Miguel de Velasco seized control of the government from Andrés de Santa Cruz during the dissolution of the Peru–Bolivian Confederation.
- Guatemala: On March 24, Rafael Carrera initiated a pronunciamiento in Mataquescuintla, in opposition to Carlos Salazar Castro's pro-Morazán regime. Carrera's forces seized the capital on April 13, restoring Mariano Rivera Paz as head of state.
- Züriputsch in Switzerland

=== 1841 ===
- Bolivia (June): Sebastián Ágreda overthrew José Miguel de Velasco, later installing the pro-Andrés de Santa Cruz politician Mariano Enrique Calvo as president.
- Bolivia (September): José Ballivián deposed Mariano Enrique Calvo and returned Andrés de Santa Cruz to power.
- Bases de Tacubaya in Mexico: President Anastasio Bustamante was deposed for the second time by Antonio López de Santa Anna.

=== 1842 ===
- Vučić's Rebellion in Serbia: Toma Vučić Perišić overthrew the Obrenović Dynasty in a coup, leading the Karađorđević dynasty to power.
- Costa Rica: Francisco Morazán, former President of the Federal Republic of Central America, invaded the Free State of Costa Rica and seized power. He was later deposed by popular uprising and executed.
- Portugal: Coup of Costa Cabral

=== 1843 ===
- 3 September 1843 Revolution in Greece
- Spain: A successful Moderate pronunciamiento of Ramón María Narváez and Francisco Serrano y Domínguez ended the Baldomero Espartero regency.

=== 1844 ===
- 1844 Haitian coup d'état: While Haitian president Charles Rivière-Hérard led a campaign against the Dominican Republic, a coup deposed him and brought General Philippe Guerrier to power.
- 1844 Dominican coup d'état: In the Dominican War of Independence, a coup was launched by revolutionary Juan Pablo Duarte to bring a new junta to power. General Pedro Santana took power in a counter-coup shortly afterwards.
- Three Hours' Revolution in Mexico: a conflict between Santa Anna's puppet ruler, Valentín Canalizo, and the Mexican Congress, headed by José Joaquín de Herrera, culminates in Canalizo's deposition by congress forces and the removal of Antonio López de Santa Anna from power.

=== 1845 ===
- Mexico: General Mariano Paredes led a coup that deposed president José Joaquín de Herrera.

=== 1846 ===
- Plan of the Ciudadela in Mexico: In a first coup during the Mexican–American War, General José Mariano Salas overthrew the Paredes government, ending the centralist system and restoring federalism.
- Emboscada in Portugal

=== 1847 ===
- Revolt of the Polkos in Mexico: In a second coup during the Mexican–American War, rebels succeed in deposing Valentín Gómez Farías.

=== 1848 ===
- Bolivia (January): Manuel Isidoro Belzu overthrew Eusebio Guilarte and installed José Miguel de Velasco Franco as president.
- Bolivia (December): Manuel Isidoro Belzu turned on Velasco and overthrew him. An attempted counter-coup by Velasco failed.

=== 1851 ===
- Portugal: Revolt of João Carlos de Saldanha (beginning of Regeneração)
- 1851 Nicaraguan coup d'état: On August 4, a military coup by José Trinidad Muñoz expels Supreme Director Laureano Pineda to Honduras. However, a Honduran-backed campaign restores Pineda to power in Nicaragua that same year.
- 1851 French coup d'état: On December 2, President Louis-Napoléon Bonaparte launches a self-coup by dissolving the Assembly and became the sole ruler of the country. In the following year, he restored the Empire by referendum.

=== 1852 ===
- Revolution of 11 September 1852 in Argentina

=== 1853 ===
- Plan de Hospicio in Mexico: Santanistas succeed in deposing Mariano Arista, culminating in the return of Antonio López de Santa Anna to power and the establishment of his last government.

=== 1854 ===
- Colombia: In the Republic of New Granada, José María Melo overthrew José María Obando in a coup that began the Colombian Civil War of 1854
- Mexico: Following the Plan of Ayutla, Benito Juárez deposed Antonio López de Santa Anna and installed Juan Álvarez as president.
- Spanish Revolution of 1854: General Leopoldo O'Donnell led a successful revolutionary coup in Madrid.
- Bolivia: A military revolt failed to overthrow Manuel Isidoro Belzu.

=== 1857 ===
- Bolivia: José María Linares overthrew Jorge Córdova and Manuel Isidoro Belzu by proxy.
- Plan of Tacubaya in Mexico: President Ignacio Comonfort performs a self-coup against Constitution of 1857, culminating in the outbreak of a civil war, the War of Reform.

=== 1861 ===
- 1861 Colombian coup d'état: Tomás Cipriano de Mosquera overthrew Julio Arboleda Pombo
- Bolivia: José María Linares was overthrown by his own ministerial cabinet, led by José María de Achá.
- Qing dynasty (China): Empress Dowager Cixi launched the Xinyou Coup in the Qing dynasty of China in response to the death of Xianfeng Emperor.

=== 1864 ===
- Bolivia: Mariano Melgarejo rose up against José María de Achá and defeated his forces and those of Manuel Isidoro Belzu, who was also attempting to return to power. Melgarejo declared himself President.

=== 1866 ===
- Monstrous coalition in Romania: Prince Alexandru Ioan Cuza was forced to abdicate by a political and military coalition.

=== 1867 ===
- Haiti: General Sylvain Salnave, opponent of the deposed Fabre Geffrard, seizes power and proclaims himself "Protector of the Republic" after pressure from a mutiny of his adherents.
- 1867 Colombian coup d'état: Santos Acosta overthrew Tomás Cipriano de Mosquera
- Japan: Compelled by the Satchō Alliance, the Tokugawa shogunate returned political power to Emperor Meiji.

=== 1868 ===
- Glorious Revolution in Spain: A pronunciamiento of Juan Bautista Topete in Cádiz deposed Queen Isabella II.

=== 1870 ===
- 1870 Costa Rican coup d'état: Bruno Carranza came to power in Costa Rica after deposing President Jesús Jiménez Zamora. He resigned three months later.
- Republic of Ploiești in Romania: a republican coup led by Colonel Alexandru Candiano-Popescu failed to overthrow monarch Carol I of Romania.

=== 1871 ===
- October 1871 Mexican coup attempt: An attempted coup is crushed by Benito Juárez
- 1871 Liberian coup d'état
- Bolivia: Agustín Morales led a popular revolt against Mariano Melgarejo.

=== 1872 ===
- A Pavorosa in Portugal: a planned putsch by the Count of Peniche Caetano Gaspar de Almeida e Noronha is detected by the Portuguese authorities led by Fontes Pereira de Melo
- Gutiérrez Brothers' rebellion in Peru

=== 1874 ===
- Spain (January): After Emilio Castelar lost a vote of confidence and a new government was to be instituted, Manuel Pavía y Rodríguez de Alburquerque ordered Congress to evacuate and formed a new government, giving power to Francisco Serrano.
- Spain (December): Arsenio Martínez Campos overthrew the First Spanish Republic and installed Alfonso XII as king.

=== 1876 ===
- 1876 Ottoman coup d'état
- Costa Rica: Aniceto Esquivel Sáenz was deposed in a coup d'état led by Vicente Herrera Zeledón.
- Mexico: Following the Plan of Tuxtepec, Porfirio Díaz overthrew Sebastián Lerdo de Tejada and installed himself as president.
- Bolivia: A military coup led by Hilarión Daza overthrew the president Tomás Frías Ametller and installed Hilarión Daza as president, leading to the War of the Pacific.

=== 1879 ===
- Bolivia: Hilarión Daza was deposed while fighting in the War of the Pacific.

=== 1884 ===
- Gapsin Coup in Korea: The Japanese-supported Gaehwa Party attempts to overthrow the Joseon government, but is suppressed.

=== 1885 ===
- 1885 Nepal coup d'état

=== 1886 ===
- 1886 Bulgarian coup d'état

=== 1889 ===
- Proclamation of the Republic in Brazil: A military coup led by Marshal Deodoro da Fonseca deposed the Brazilian Emperor, Dom Pedro II, proclaimed the Republic, and installed a provisional government.

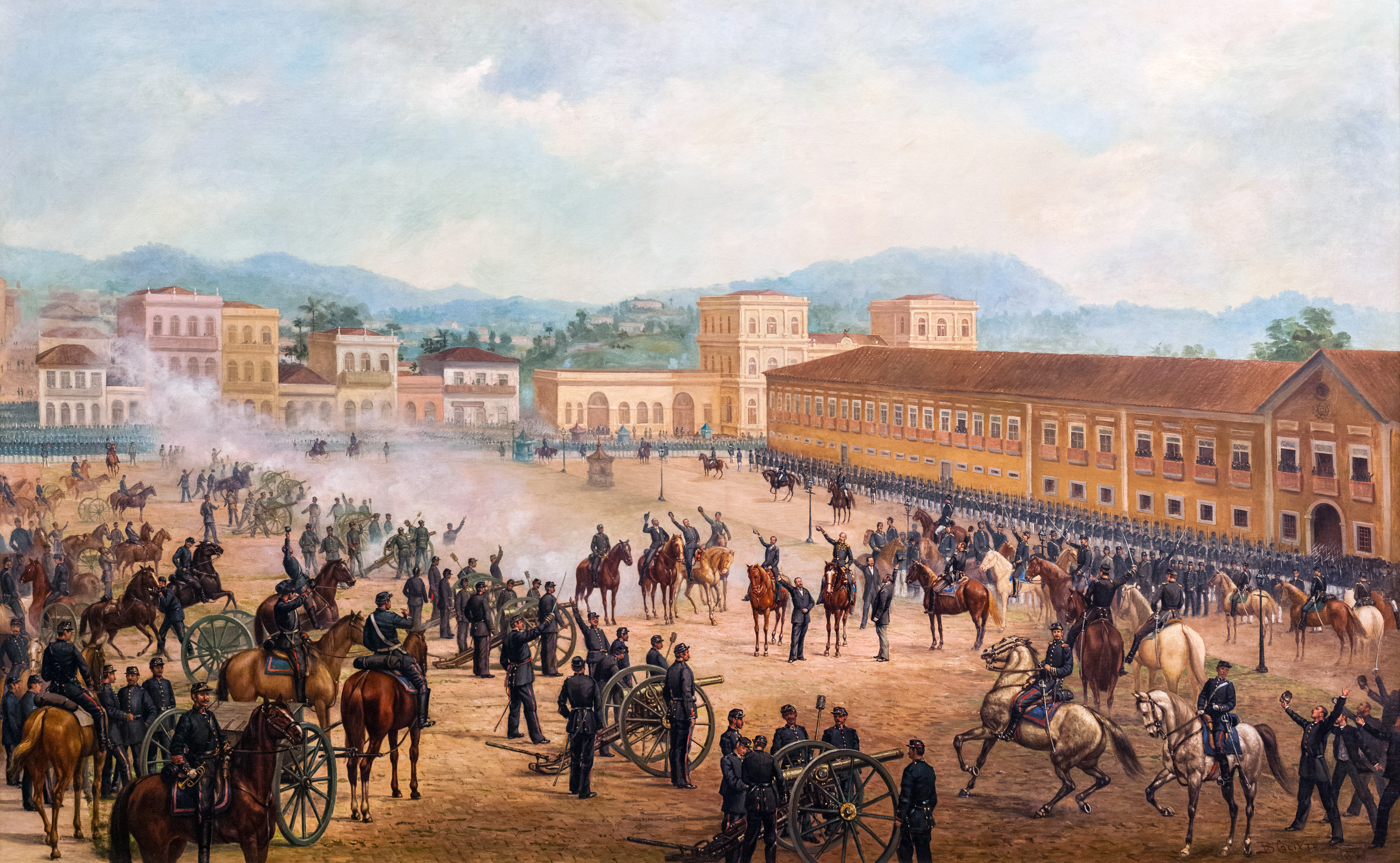
The Empire of Brazil ended in a coup d'état which formed a republic.

=== 1891 ===
- Chile: President José Manuel Balmaceda breaks the constitutional order, carrying out a self-coup and ruling without obstacles] Outbreak of the Chilean Civil War of 1891
- Brazil: President Marshal Deodoro da Fonseca dissolved the National Congress, but soon after resigned after the Navy rebellion.

=== 1893 ===
- Overthrow of the Hawaiian Kingdom: Sanford Dole and American plantation owners overthrew the independent Kingdom of Hawaiʻi led by Queen Liliʻuokalani

=== 1895 ===
- 1895 Wilcox rebellion in the Republic of Hawaii: Robert W. Wilcox unsuccessfully launched a counter-coup in an attempt to restore the Hawaiian Monarchy.
- Bahrain: Shubar al-Sitri launched an unsuccessful coup to depose the Bahraini monarchy.

=== 1896 ===
- Rucunshu Coup in Rwanda kingdom: a bloody royal coup deposes Mibambwe IV Rutarindwa and replaces him with Yuhi IV

=== 1898 ===
- Wilmington massacre (also known as the Wilmington coup) in the United States: White supremacists in Wilmington, North Carolina overthrew the biracial Fusionist government.
- Qing dynasty (China): Empress Dowager Cixi launched the Wuxu Coup in response to the Hundred Days' Reform.

=== 1899 ===
- Bolivia: José Manuel Pando defeated Severo Fernández, bringing an end to the Federal War.
- Venezuela: Cipriano Castro's army overthrew the government of Ignacio Andrade.

== 1900–1919 ==
=== 1900 ===
- 1900 Colombian coup d'état

=== 1901 ===
- 1901 Nepal coup d'état: Chandra Shumsher Rana staged a coup that overthrew Dev Shumsher Rana, establishing himself as Prime Minister of Nepal.

=== 1902 ===
- 1902 Paraguayan coup d'état: Caballerista coup led by Juan Antonio Escurra overthrew Emilio Aceval, who is replaced by interim president Andrés Héctor Carvallo.
- 1902 Dominican coup d'état: Vice President Horacio Vásquez overthrew President Juan Isidro Jimenes.

=== 1903 ===
- May Coup in Serbia: The Black Hand group of military officers, led by Colonel Dragutin Dimitrijević, killed Alexander I of Serbia in coup d'état named Majski Prevrat (May Overthrow).
- March 1903 Dominican coup d'état: Horacio Vásquez is overthrown by Alejandro Woss y Gil.
- November 1903 Dominican coup d'état: Carlos Morales Languasco overthrew President Alejandro Woss y Gil.

=== 1904 ===
- 1904 Honduran coup d'état: On February 8, Manuel Bonilla, with the support of the American mercenary Lee Christmas, carries out a self-coup against the National Congress of Honduras.
- Brazil: A failed military coup was led by Lauro Sodré after a week of civil disorder during the Vaccine Revolt.

=== 1905 ===
- 1905 Dominican self-coup attempt: On 24 December, Carlos Morales Languasco plans a self-coup, but only a fraction of Dominican forces had arrived following his order. The plot is discovered by the President's opponents, which leads to Languasco's resignation.

=== 1906 ===
- 1906 Ecuadorian coup d'état: Under the pretext of saving the Ecuadorian Liberal Revolution, Eloy Alfaro launches a coup against Lizardo García.

=== 1907 ===
- June 1907 coup in Russia
- Hafidiya

=== 1908 ===
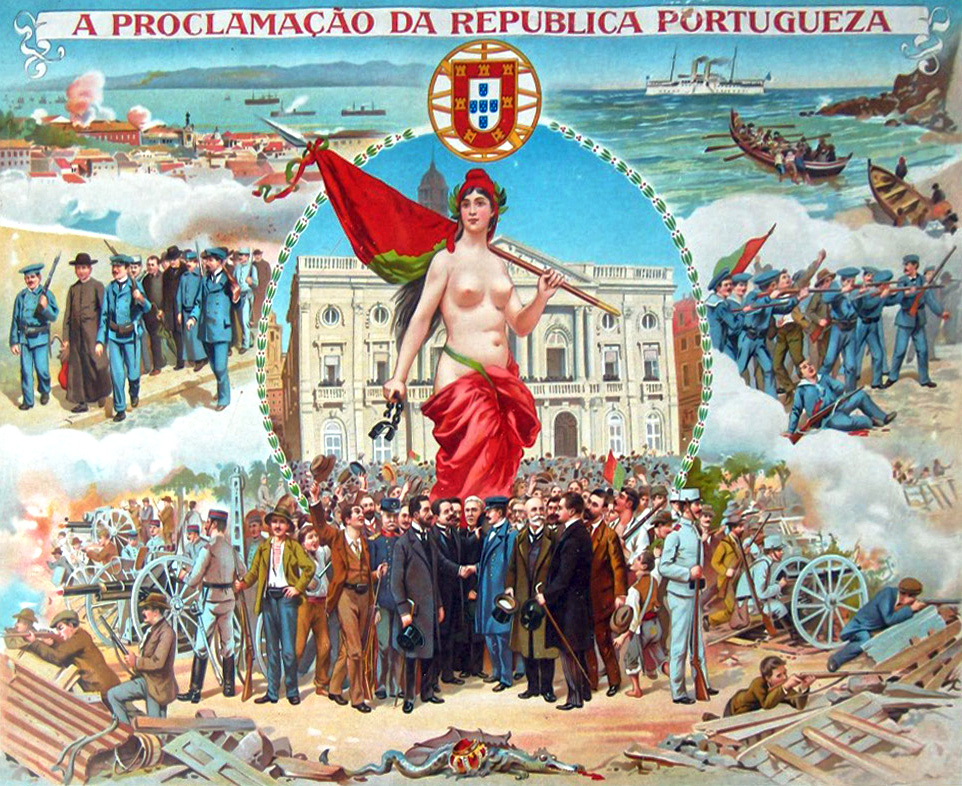
The 5 October 1910 revolution which established a Republic in Portugal

- 1908 Venezuelan coup d'état: Juan Vicente Gómez took office as President of Venezuela after Cipriano Castro left for Europe to receive medical treatment.
- 1908 Paraguayan coup d'état: General Albino Jara overthrew Benigno Ferreira.
- 1908 bombardment of the Majlis in Iran: Persian Cossack forces, commanded by Vladimir Liakhov and the other Russian officers, bombarded and by that suppressed the Iranian parliament. Liakhov was subsequently made Military Governor of Tehran by the Shah of Persia, Mohammad Ali Shah Qajar.
- Young Turk Revolution in the Ottoman Empire: The Committee of Union and Progress, a Young Turks organization, rebelled against the absolute rule of Sultan Abdul Hamid II which resulted in the restoration of the Ottoman constitution of 1876 and marked the beginning of the Second Constitutional Era and multi-party politics in the Ottoman Empire.

=== 1909 ===
- Goudi coup in Greece: A secret society of military officers called the Military League issued a pronunciamiento, resulting in the replacement of Prime Minister Dimitrios Rallis government and various reforms.
- 31 March Incident in the Ottoman Empire: Shortly after the Young Turk Revolution, members of the military convened on Sultan Ahmet Square to demand reestablishment of Sharia. After a brief period of rival groups claiming to represent the legitimate government, the uprising was suppressed and the former government was ultimately restored.
- 1909 Peruvian coup attempt

=== 1910 ===
- 5 October 1910 revolution in Portugal: A republican coup d'état deposed King Manuel II of Portugal and established the Portuguese First Republic.

=== 1911 ===
- 1911 Ecuadorian coup d'état: Emilio Estrada Carmona overthrew Eloy Alfaro.

=== 1912 ===
- 1912 Ottoman coup d'état: Members of the Savior Officers, a pro-Freedom and Accord Party clique, issued a memorandum to the Grand Vizier Mehmed Said Pasha to resign and dissolve parliament, which was overwhelmingly dominated by the CUP following the rigged 1912 election known as the "election of clubs". The Savior Officers got their wish, resulting in Ahmed Muhtar Pasha's Great Cabinet.

=== 1913 ===
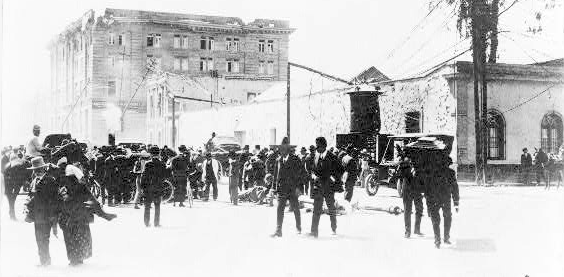
Citizens throng around The Citadel (La ciudadela) building during La decena tragica in 1913

- 1913 Ottoman coup d'état: Led by Talaat and Enver Pasha, the Committee of Union and Progress overthrew the Freedom and Accord Party coalition and introduced a military dictatorship, led by the Three Pashas.
- Mexico: During the Ten Tragic Days, General Victoriano Huerta overthrew and murdered president Francisco Madero.
- United Kingdom: During the suffragette bombing and arson campaign, a plot to kidnap Home Secretary Reginald McKenna was revealed and discussed in the House of Commons and in the press. It was revealed that suffragettes were planning to kidnap one or more cabinet ministers and subjecting them to force-feeding, until they conceded women's suffrage. After the publicization of the plans, the plans were aborted.
- United Kingdom: During the suffragette bombing and arson campaign, Special Branch detectives discovered that the WSPU had plans to create a suffragette "army" known as the "People's Training Corps" and informally as "Mrs Pankhurst's Army". The army was intended to proceed in force to Downing Street to imprison ministers until they conceded women's suffrage. After the discovery of the plans, they were aborted.

=== 1914 ===
- 1914 Peruvian coup d'état: Óscar R. Benavides overthrew Guillermo Billinghurst.

=== 1915 ===
- China: Yuan Shikai launched a self-coup by proclaiming himself emperor of the Chinese Empire.

=== 1916 ===
- Ethiopia: While touring the city of Harar, Lij Iyasu was deposed by a cabal of aristocrats in favor of his aunt Zewditu. Forces loyal to him were defeated at Segale, and Lij Iyasu wandered northwestern Ethiopia with a small band of loyal followers until captured five years later.

=== 1917 ===
- 1917 Costa Rican coup d'état: President Alfredo González Flores was overthrown in a coup d'état led by General Federico Tinoco Granados, who established a repressive military dictatorship.
- Manchu Restoration in China: Zhang Xun launched a coup in an attempt to restore the Qing monarchy. It was quickly reversed by Republican troops.
- Kornilov affair in Russia: An attempted coup by Commander-in-Chief Lavr Kornilov was defeated by the Russian Provisional Government.

=== 1918 ===
- 1918 Ukrainian coup d'état: Lieutenant general Pavlo Skoropadskyi overthrew the government of the Ukrainian People's Republic with support from the Imperial German Army. Skoropadskyi was declared Hetman (monarch) of all Ukraine.
- Russia (August): In a first coup in Arkhangelsk, Captain Georgi Chaplin deposes the Bolshevik local government and establishes the Supreme Administration of the Northern Region.
- Russia (September): In a second coup in Arkhangelsk, Captain Georgi Chaplin expels the Popular Socialists' government to the Solovetsky Islands, but his attempted coup fails.
- Coup in Khiva: the monarch of the Khanate of Khiva, Isfandiyar Khan, is executed in a coup by the commander Junayd Khan
- Ukrainian coup in Bukovina: On November 6, Ukrainian revolutionaries seize power in the Duchy of Bukovina and declare loyalty to the West Ukrainian People's Republic, but are soon defeated by an intervention from the Kingdom of Romania.
- November 1918 Liechtenstein putsch
- Omsk Coup in Russia: Alexander Kolchak overthrew the Provisional All-Russian Government and took control of the newly formed Russian State, establishing a military dictatorship.
- Luxembourg rebellions

=== 1919 ===
- 1919 Polish coup attempt in Lithuania: The Polish right-wing unsuccessfully tried to overthrow the left-wing government.
- Spartacist uprising in Germany: The German Communist Party unsuccessfully attempted to overthrow the government.
- István Friedrich overthrew the Hungarian People's Republic led by Gyula Peidl, in Romanian-occupied Budapest.
- Polonsky conspiracy in Ukraine: Failed plot by Ukrainian Bolsheviks to seize power in the Makhnovshchina region and kill Nestor Makhno.
- 1919 Peruvian coup d'état: On July 4, the military staged a coup to secure the inauguration of Augusto B. Leguía, the winner of the 1919 election. The coup began the Oncenio, a personalist dictatorship led by Leguía.

== 1920–1929 ==
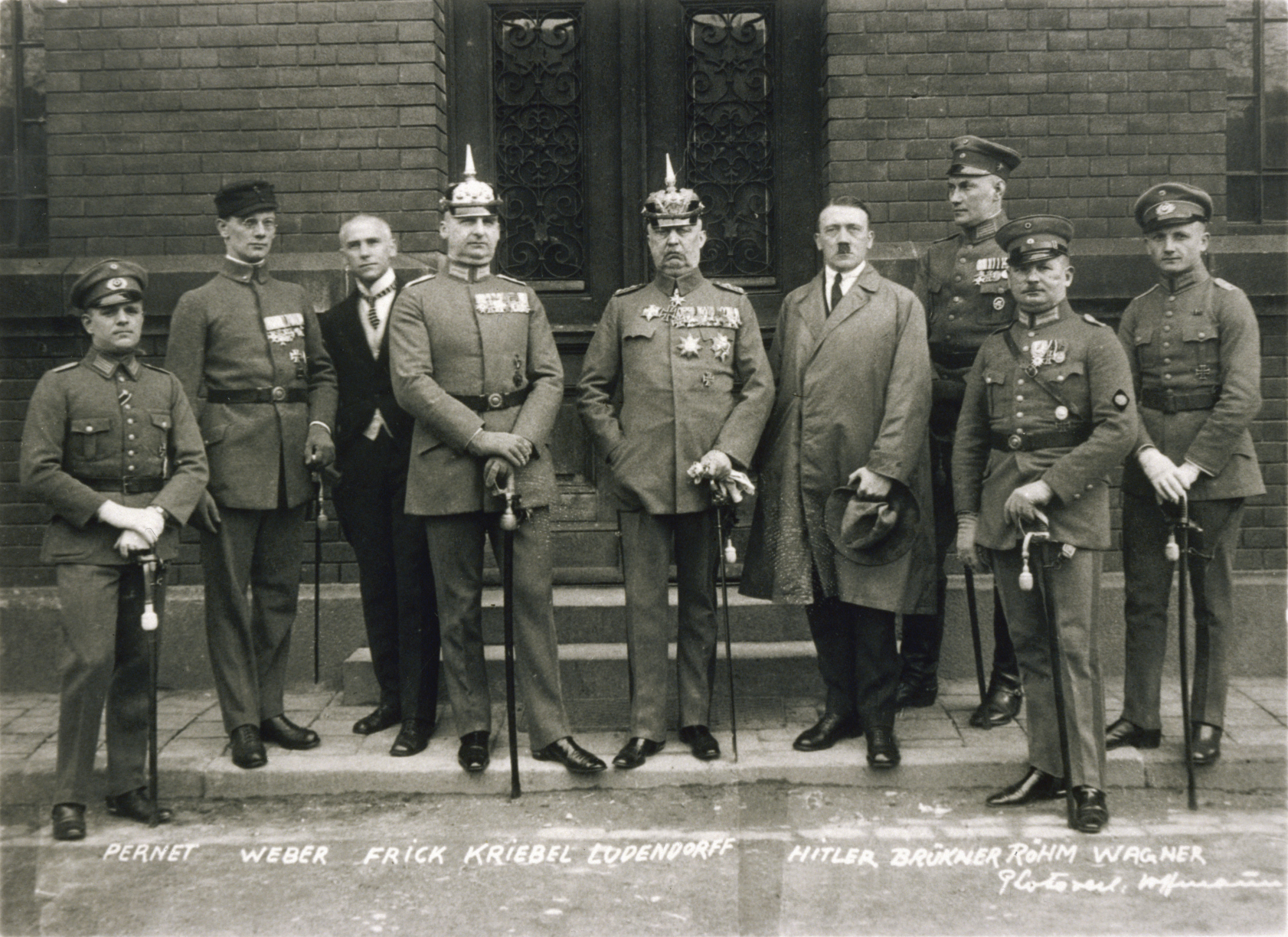
Defendants in the Beer Hall Putsch trial. Ludendorff is fifth from the left, with Hitler to the right. Ernst Röhm is to the right and in front of Hitler. Note that only two of the defendants, Hitler and Frick, were dressed in civilian clothing.

=== 1920 ===
- Kapp Putsch in Germany: The Marinebrigade Ehrhardt failed to overthrow the Weimar Republic.
- 1920 Georgian coup attempt in the Democratic Republic of Georgia: The Bolsheviks failed to overthrow the Democratic Republic of Georgia with the help of the Soviet Russian Red Army.
- 1920 Bolivian coup d'état: 21 years of continuous single-party democratic rule ended when Bautista Saavedra overthrew José Gutiérrez Guerra.
- Plan of Agua Prieta in Mexico: General Álvaro Obregón, backed by labor unions and Zapatistas, ousted President Venustiano Carranza.

=== 1921 ===
- Persia: Colonel Reza Khan, with Zia'eddin Tabatabaee, launched a coup against Ahmad Shah Qajar.
- Charles IV attempts to retake the throne in Hungary: The former King Charles I of Austria, who had also reigned as Charles IV of Hungary, returned twice to try, unsuccessfully, to retake his throne from Regent Miklós Horthy.

=== 1922 ===
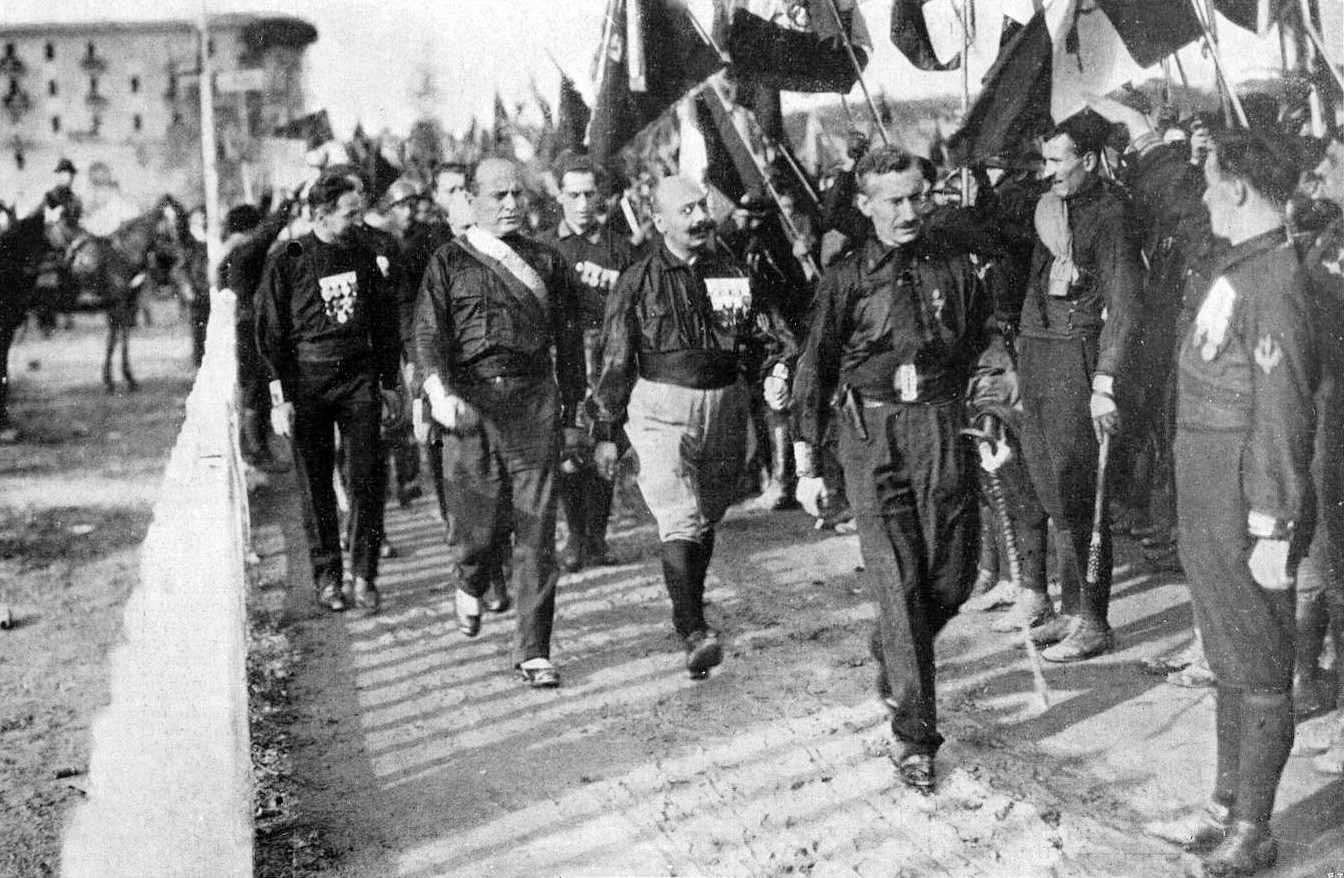
Benito Mussolini and Fascist Blackshirts during the March on Rome in 1922. Mussolini stayed out of most of the march.

- Greece: Following the defeat in the Asia Minor Campaign, Venizelist army officers, chief amongst them Nikolaos Plastiras and Stylianos Gonatas, led the Greek Army in revolt against the royal government and forced the renewed abdication of King Constantine I of Greece.
- Albania: A failed coup d'état attempt was led by Bajram Curri, Elez Isufi, Hamit Toptani and Halit Lleshi.
- Copacabana Fort revolt in Brazil: a failed tenentist movement against the government of Epitácio Pessoa and the election of Artur Bernardes
- March on Rome in Italy: Between 27 and 29 October, the March on Rome by the Blackshirts led to the installation of Benito Mussolini of the National Fascist Party as prime minister of the Kingdom of Italy, supported by King Victor Emmanuel III. After the election of 1924 and the assassination of Giacomo Matteotti, Mussolini established a dictatorship on 3 January 1925.

=== 1923 ===
- 1923 Spanish coup d'état: Miguel Primo de Rivera installed a dictatorship without overthrowing King Alfonso XIII.
- 1923 Bulgarian coup d'état: The military, under the control of General Ivan Valkov, overthrew the Bulgarian Agrarian National Union government of Aleksandar Stamboliyski and installed one headed by Aleksandar Tsankov.
  - September uprising (14–29 September 1923). The September Uprising (Bulgarian: Септемврийско въстание, Septemvriysko vastanie) was an armed insurgency staged in September 1923 by the Bulgarian Communist Party (BCP) under Comintern pressure and attempted to overthrow Alexander Tsankov's government that had come to power with the coup d'état of 9 June. Besides its communist base, the uprising was also supported by agrarians and anarchists. The uprising's goal was the "establishment of a government of workers and peasants" in Bulgaria.
- Beer Hall Putsch in Germany: A failed coup was attempted by Nazi Party leader Adolf Hitler against the leaders of the Weimar Republic. The Nazis were repelled by police, and Hitler was later charged with treason.
- Leonardopoulos–Gargalidis coup attempt in Greece: Pro-royalist military officers attempted to stage a coup, and successfully took control of much of the Greek mainland. However, the government rallied its forces, and leaders Georgios Leonardopoulos and Panagiotis Gargalidis were ultimately surrounded and forced to surrender.

=== 1924 ===
- Brazil: São Paulo Revolt of 1924
- Chile: President Arturo Alessandri resigned and fled after the army, led by Luis Altamirano, headed a coup.
- 1924 Estonian coup attempt: Communists attempted a coup against the government, but their multiple attacks were repelled. Multiple organizers were executed; some escaped to the Soviet Union, but were later executed during the Great Purge.
- June Revolution in Albania: A coup d'état overthrew the pro-Ahmet Zogu government and established a leftist government led by Fan Noli. On 24 December of that year, Zogu returned to power, and Noli and his government fled from the country.
- Beijing Coup in China: On 23 October, Warlord Feng Yuxiang seized Beijing from President Cao Kun at a crucial moment during the Second Zhili–Fengtian War.

=== 1925 ===
- 1925 Chilean coup d'état: General Carlos Ibáñez del Campo and Colonel Marmaduke Grove deposed military ruler Luis Altamirano. They later allowed former president Arturo Alessandri to return to Chile.
- Greece: General Theodoros Pangalos seized power in a coup.

=== 1926 ===
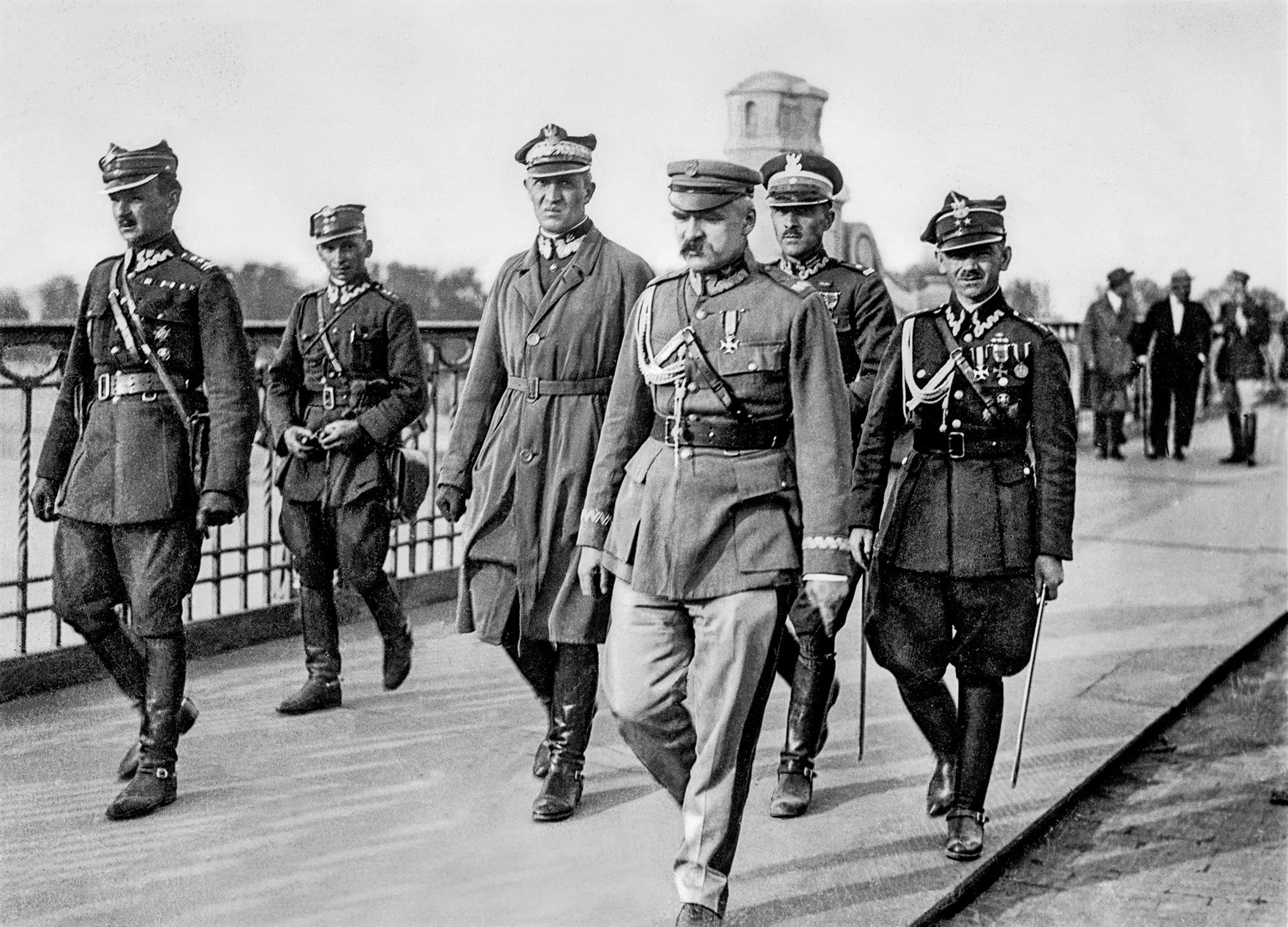
Józef Piłsudski and other leaders of the May Coup (1926) on Poniatowski Bridge in Warsaw

- Nicaragua: Emiliano Chamorro overthrows Carlos José Solórzano, starting the Constitutionalist War.
- May Coup in Poland: Marshal Józef Piłsudski overthrew the democratically elected government of President Stanisław Wojciechowski and Prime Minister Wincenty Witos. A new government was installed, headed by Kazimierz Bartel.
- 28 May 1926 coup d'état in Portugal: Nationalist military forces overthrew the unstable First Portuguese Republic and instituted a new regime, the National Dictatorship.
- 1926 Lithuanian coup d'état: A military-organized coup resulted in the replacement of the democratically elected government with a conservative authoritarian government led by Antanas Smetona.
- Greece: The dictatorship of General Theodoros Pangalos was overthrown by General Georgios Kondylis.
- failed coup was attempted: A failed coup against the dictatorship of Miguel Primo de Rivera.

=== 1928 ===
- Ethiopia: Balcha Safo attempted a coup against regent Ras Tafari Makonnen (who would later become Emperor Haile Selassie I); the uprising never amounted to more than a show of force and was put down decisively by Kassa Haile Darge. Balcha Safo surrendered and was imprisoned.
- Ethiopian coup d'état of 1928: Supporters of Empress Zewditu attempted to eliminate the heir apparent and Crown Prince Tafari Makonnen; the coup d'état ended in failure.

=== 1929 ===
- 1929 Spanish coup d'état: a failed coup against the dictatorship of Primo de Rivera
- 1929 Tuvan coup d'état in the Tuvan People's Republic: Five Tuvan youths supported by the Soviet Union successfully overthrew the government, and one of them, Salchak Toka, became supreme ruler.

== 1930–1939 ==
=== 1930 ===
- Gugsa Wale's rebellion in Ethiopia: An uprising by Ras Gugsa Welle against King Tafari Makonnen (later Emperor Haile Selassie I) was put down decisively at the Battle of Anchem by the Minister of War, Ras Mulugeta Yeggazu.
- Dominican Republic: Rafael Leónidas Trujillo declared martial law, deposing Horacio Vásquez after a devastating hurricane.
- Romania: With support of the National Peasants' Party, Carol II of Romania removes his young son Michael I in a coup, being proclaimed king.
- Bolivia: General Carlos Blanco Galindo overthrew the ministerial cabinet, which had been operating as the executive power since the resignation of Hernando Siles Reyes the month prior.
- 1930 Peruvian coup d'état: Luis Miguel Sánchez Cerro overthrew Augusto B. Leguía.
- 1930 Argentine coup d'état: General José Félix Uriburu overthrew President Hipólito Yrigoyen.
- Revolution of 1930 in Brazil: An armed revolution culminated in a coup d'état which ousted President Washington Luís and established the Brazilian military junta of 1930.
- Guatemala: Manuel María Orellana Contreras overthrows Baudilio Palma

=== 1931 ===
- 1931 Panamanian coup d'état: On January 2, members of Acción Comunal led a coup that overthrew President Florencio Harmodio Arosemena.
- March Incident in Japan: The radical, ultranationalist Sakurakai secret society attempted to start large-scale riots in Tokyo, which instigators hoped would lead to martial law and then a coup d'état by the Imperial Japanese Army. Two attempts to start riots failed, and the leaders of the plot were arrested.
- October incident in Japan: The Sakurakai again plotted a coup, this time to be instigated by assassinations of key statesmen and officials. The plot was foiled by some of the plotters abandoning the effort, and leaks that reached the War Minister.
- 1931 Salvadoran coup d'état: On 2 December, Arturo Araujo was overthrown by Maximiliano Hernández Martínez.

=== 1932 ===
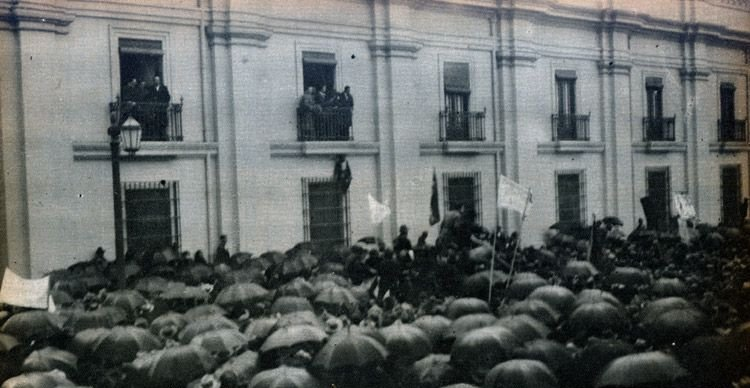
March in support of the proclamation of the Socialist Republic of Chile, in front of La Moneda Palace (12 June 1932)

- Preußenschlag in the Free State of Prussia in Germany: Chancellor Franz von Papen successfully took over the Free State of Prussia, the largest constituent state of the Weimar Republic, by using an emergency decree issued by President Paul von Hindenburg.
- Mäntsälä Rebellion in Finland: An attempted coup by the Lapua Movement failed. According to some contemporaries, if the coup had been successful, then Vihtori Kosola, the leader of the movement, would have become a fascist dictator.
- May 15 Incident in Japan: Reactionary elements of the Imperial Japanese Navy assassinated Prime Minister Inukai Tsuyoshi, but the coup was otherwise unsuccessful.
- Siamese coup d'état of 1932: A bloodless transition occurred, marking the change from the absolute monarchy of Siam to a constitutional monarchy, the introduction of democracy and the first constitution of Thailand, and the creation of the National Assembly of Thailand.
- Chile: A coup headed by the military deposed President Juan Esteban Montero and created the Socialist Republic of Chile. After three months, other army officers headed a counter-coup and ended the regime, and the new provisional president, Abraham Oyanedel, restored democracy.
- Sanjurjada in Spain: general José Sanjurjo and others failed to overthrow Manuel Azaña, president of the Second Spanish Republic, on August 10, 1932.
- 1932 Colonial Building riot in St. John's, Newfoundland: On 5 April 1932, prompted by the Great Depression and corruption in the Squires administration, a peaceful protest degenerated into riots and violence. The riots led to the fall of the Squires government and the defeat of Squires's Liberal Party.

=== 1933 ===
- Uruguay: President Gabriel Terra dissolved Parliament and headed a coup.
- Sergeants' Revolt in Cuba: Fulgencio Batista ousted Carlos Manuel de Céspedes y Quesada.
- Business Plot (also called the Wall Street Putsch or the White House Putsch) in the United States: Retired Marine Corps Major General Smedley Butler asserted that wealthy businessmen were plotting to create a fascist veterans' organization with Butler as its leader and use it in a coup d'état to overthrow Roosevelt. While historians have questioned whether or not a coup was actually close to execution, most agree that some sort of "wild scheme" was contemplated and discussed.
- 1933 Siamese coup d'état: Colonel Phot Phahonyothin led a peaceful coup against Premier Phraya Manopakorn Nititada

=== 1934 ===
- 1934 Estonian coup d'état: Konstantin Päts carried out a self-coup on 12 March.
- 1934 Latvian coup d'état: Kārlis Ulmanis carried out a self-coup against the parliamentary system.
- 1934 Bulgarian coup d'état: The Zveno military organization and the Military Union, with the aid of the Bulgarian Army, overthrew the government of the wide Popular Bloc coalition and replaced it with one under Kimon Georgiev.
- 1934 Lithuanian coup attempt: Supporters of former Prime Minister Augustinas Voldemaras attempted to overthrow the government of President Antanas Smetona.
- July Putsch in Austria: On 25–30 July, Austrian Nazis, attempted a coup against the Austrofascist regime. Although they succeeded in resulting in the assassinating chancellor Engelbert Dollfuss, Kurt Schuschnigg succeeded him and the Austrofascist regime remained in power.
- 1934 Cuban coups d'état: A coup on 15 January overthrew provisional president Ramón Grau. A second coup three days later overthrew his replacement, Carlos Hevia, and installed Carlos Mendieta as president.
- 1934 Bolivian coup d'état: Generals deposed President Daniel Salamanca Urey amidst the Chaco War.

=== 1935 ===
- Greek coup attempt of 1935: A Venizelist coup attempt, headed by Nikolaos Plastiras against the People's Party government of Panagis Tsaldaris, failed.
- Mexico: In an internal coup, Lázaro Cárdenas deported and exiled President Plutarco Elías Calles, effectively ending Calles' control over the Mexican government.
- Greece: General Georgios Kondylis deposed the sitting government and dissolved the Republic, restoring the Greek monarchy.

=== 1936 ===
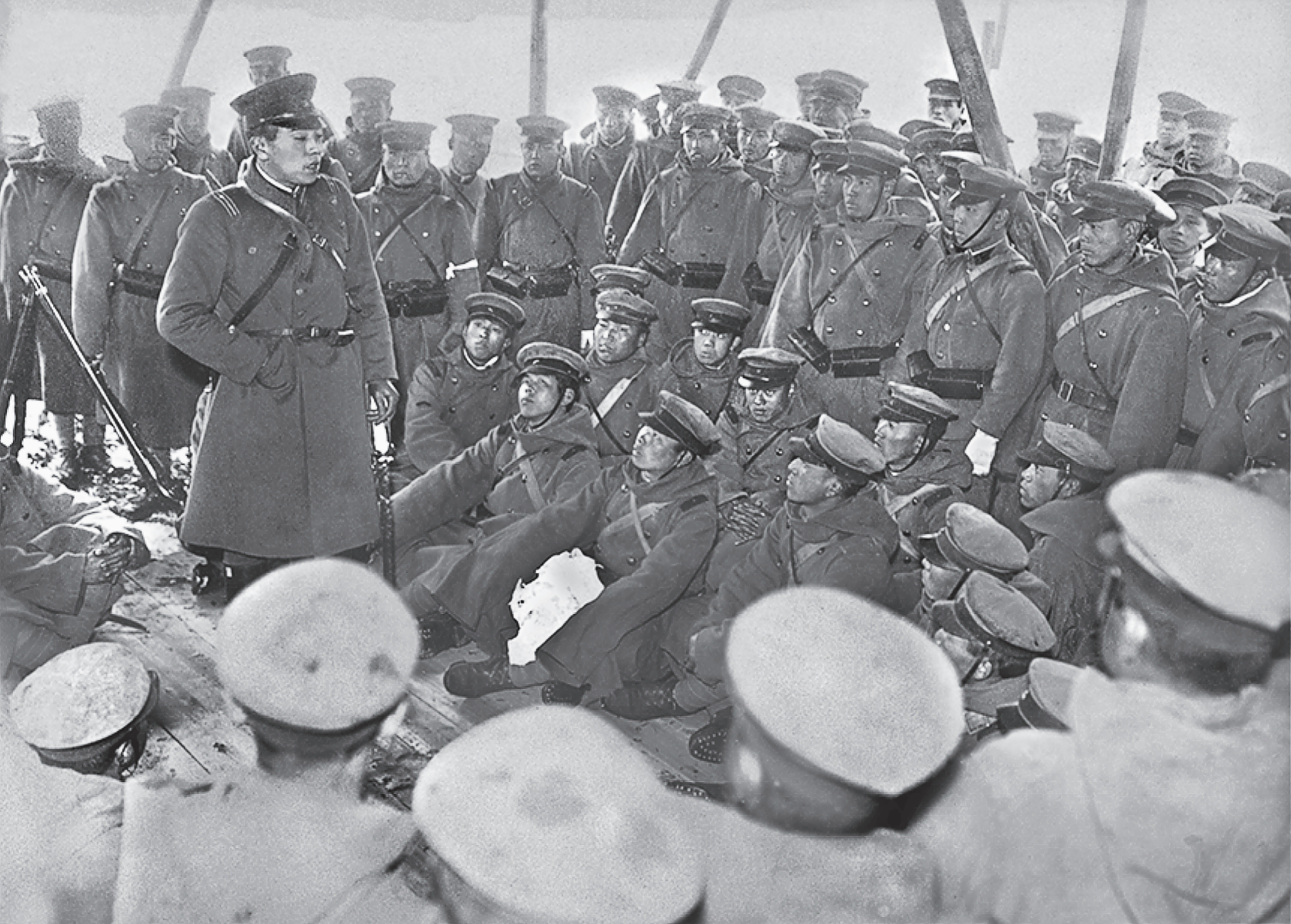
1st Lt. Nibu Masatada and his rebel troops in the 26 February Incident of 1936

- Xi'an Incident in China: General Chiang Kai-shek was kidnapped by his deputy Zhang Xueliang, who demanded that Chiang stop fighting the Chinese Communists and instead agree to a united resistance against the Japanese. His wife's and her brother's subsequent negotiation with Zhang ensured Chiang's release two weeks later.
- 1936 Bolivian coup d'état: Germán Busch overthrew José Luis Tejada Sorzano and handed the presidency to David Toro.
- 1936 Nicaraguan coup d'état: a coup by National Guard director Anastasio Somoza García forces the resignation of president Juan Bautista Sacasa, beginning the Somoza family's 43-year rule.
- Spanish coup of July 1936: Nationalists seized control of parts of Spain, commencing the Spanish Civil War. Later, General Francisco Franco assumed control of the country as dictator.
- February 26 Incident in Japan: A coup attempt by junior military officers failed in installing a militarist government.
- Greece: A coup of Ioannis Metaxas on 4 August established the 4th of August Regime.
- Kingdom of Iraq: A 30 October coup by Bakr Sidqi and Hikmat Sulayman deposed Prime Minister Yasin al-Hashimi.

=== 1937 ===
- France: A Cagoulard plot to install a pro-Nazi government was foiled by police.
- Bolivia: Dissatisfied with the speed of new reforms, Germán Busch led a popular movement which secured the resignation of David Toro.
- 1937 Brazilian coup d'état: President Getúlio Vargas, governing democratically since 1934, launched a self-coup and became the Dictator of the Estado Novo ("New State").

=== 1938 ===
- Romanian coup d'état of February 10, 1938: King Carol II of Romania launched a self-coup, which abolished parliamentary democracy in favor of a royal dictatorship.
- Brazil: Vargas forces detected the attempted Integralist coup, leading to a shootout with insurgents at the Guanabara Palace.
- Oster conspiracy, a plot to overthrow Hitler in the event of war with Czechoslovakia.

=== 1939 ===
- Casado's coup in Spain: A coup by military officers and members of the Spanish Socialist Workers' Party in the Republican zone of Spain resulted in the formation of the National Defence Council as a step towards a negotiated peace with the Nationalists. The negotiations eventually failed, but the coup signaled the end of the Spanish Civil War.
- 1939 Liechtenstein putsch

== 1940–1949 ==
=== 1940 ===
- La Camperada in Bolivia (also known as the Chapaco Putsch): On March 26, a group of Tarija's officers under the leadership of Antenor Ichazo rebelled against the Quintanilla government and President-elect Enrique Peñaranda.
- Norway: The fascist politician Vidkun Quisling attempted to overthrow the government in response to the German invasion of Denmark and Norway.
- Occupation of the Baltic states in Estonia, Latvia, and Lithuania: Several Soviet-organised coups occurred during the Soviet takeover of the Baltic states.
- Mexico: Juan Andreu Almazán attempted a coup to prevent the inauguration of president-elect Manuel Ávila Camacho.

=== 1941 ===
- 1941 Panamanian coup d'état: In a first coup, Arnulfo Arias was deposed and replaced by Ricardo Adolfo de la Guardia.
- Legionnaires' Rebellion in Romania: Iron Guard paramilitaries (also known as Legionnaires) unsuccessfully attempted to overthrow dictator Ion Antonescu.
- 1941 Iraqi coup d'état: Pro-German Rashid Ali Al-Gaylani and the Golden Square overthrew the regime of the Pro-British Regent 'Abd al-Ilah, leading to the Anglo-Iraqi War.
- Yugoslav coup d'état: Pro-British King Peter II and his supporters staged a coup in the Kingdom of Yugoslavia to replace pro-German Regent Prince Paul, leading to the Axis invasion of Yugoslavia.

=== 1942 ===
- Coup attempt in French Algeria: French Resistance fighters staged a coup in Algiers in the night before Operation Torch.

=== 1943 ===
- 1943 Argentine coup d'état: Arturo Rawson overthrew Ramón Castillo.
- Fall of the Fascist regime in Italy: A coup on 24–25 July culminated with a vote of no confidence against Fascist dictator Benito Mussolini, ending 21 years of Fascist rule. He was replaced by Marshal Pietro Badoglio.
- Bolivia: Left-wing military officers and opposition militants of the Revolutionary Nationalist Movement under Gualberto Villarroel overthrew Enrique Peñaranda.

=== 1944 ===
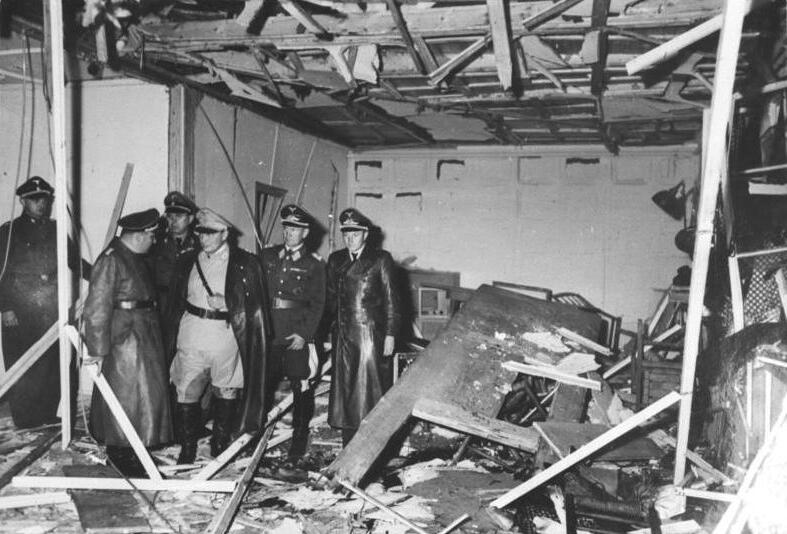
The conference room where Adolf Hitler survived the 20 July plot of 1944 after the explosion

- Palm Sunday Coup in El Salvador: On 2 April, the army attempted to oust President Maximiliano Hernández Martínez.
- 20 July plot in Germany: Part of Operation Valkyrie, the German resistance and German Reserve Army attempted to kill Adolf Hitler and seize control of the Third Reich in order to negotiate peace with the Allies. The coup failed after it was found Hitler did not die in the bomb blast, and the Reserve Army began to refuse to take orders from the German resistance. 5,000 conspirators were given show trials and summarily executed.
- King Michael's Coup in Romania: On 23 August, pro-German dictator Ion Antonescu was overthrown and King Michael I of Romania switched the nation from the Axis side of the war to join the Allies.
- 1944 Bulgarian coup d'état: The government of pro-German Prime Minister Konstantin Muraviev was overthrown, and Kimon Georgiev of the Fatherland Front switched the nation from the Axis side of the war to join the Allies.
- Lorković–Vokić plot: planned coup by members of the Croat Government and the Croatian Peasants Party to overthrow the Ustashe, and then establish a pro-Allied Government.
- Operation Panzerfaust in Hungary: Nazi Germany forcefully replaced the royalist government of Regent Miklós Horthy with the pro-Nazi Government of National Unity, led by Ferenc Szálasi.
- El Salvador: On 20 October, Andrés Ignacio Menéndez was overthrown by Osmín Aguirre y Salinas.

=== 1945 ===
- Kyūjō incident in Japan: Attempt by elements of the Ministry of War to prevent Japan's surrender.
- Japanese coup d'état in French Indochina
- 1945 Brazilian coup d'état: Getúlio Vargas's government ended in a coup led by general Mourão, one of his former supporters.
- 1945 Venezuelan coup d'état: Isaías Medina Angarita was overthrown in a coup, and Rómulo Betancourt was appointed to lead a civilian–military junta.

=== 1946 ===
- Overthrow of Gualberto Villarroel in Bolivia: An enraged mob stormed the Palacio Quemado and lynched President Gualberto Villarroel.
- 3 July Affair in Indonesia

=== 1947 ===
- 3 March affair in Indonesia
- 1947 Thai coup d'état: A coup against Thawan Thamrongnawasawat resulted in the return of Plaek Phibunsongkhram.
- Hungary: The democratically elected Prime Minister Ferenc Nagy stepped down in the face of blackmail from the Hungarian Communist Party, and was replaced by Lajos Dinnyés.
- 1947 Nicaraguan coup d'état: In a second coup, Anastasio Somoza García and National Guard deposes Leonardo Argüello Barreto.
- Romanian coup d'état of December 30th, 1947: King Michael I of Romania was forced to abdicate and leave the country at the hands of the Romanian Communist Party.

=== 1948 ===
- 1948 Czechoslovak coup d'état: The Communist Party of Czechoslovakia, backed by the Soviets, asserted control over the government of Czechoslovakia, beginning four decades of communist rule.
- 1948 Venezuelan coup d'état: The democratically elected government of Rómulo Gallegos was overthrown, and a military junta was installed with Carlos Delgado Chalbaud as its leader.
- 1948 Peruvian coup d'état: General Manuel A. Odría led a military coup that overthrew José Luis Bustamante y Rivero, initiating an authoritarian rule ("Ochenio de Odría") that lasted until 1956.
- Al-Waziri coup in the Mutawakkilite Kingdom of Yemen: Imam Yahya Muhammad Hamid ed-Din was killed and the rival Sayyid family, the Alwazirs, seized power for several weeks.
- El Salvador: On 14 December, Salvador Castaneda Castro was overthrown in a coup led by many younger military officers.

=== 1949 ===
- Palace Rebellion in Thailand: A coup attempt by loyalists of Pridi Banomyong against Plaek Phibunsongkhram failed.
- 1949 Panamanian coup d'état: President Daniel Chanis Pinzón resigned after pressure from Panama's police chief, José Antonio Remón.
- March 1949 Syrian coup d'état: A bloodless military coup by U.S.-backed general Husni al-Za'im overthrew elected President Shukri al-Quwatli, allowing passage of the Trans-Arabian Pipeline. al-Za'im became President of Syria, and Muhsin al-Barazi became prime minister.
- August 1949 Syrian coup d'état: In August, Sami al-Hinnawi, along with several other officers of the Syrian Social Nationalist Party, executed al-Za'im and al-Barazi, and installed Hashim al-Atassi as president.
- December 1949 Syrian coup d'état: In December, Adib Shishakli led a military coup. He kept al-Atassi as president, but arrested Sami al-Hinnawi to end Hashemite influence in Syria.

== 1950–1959 ==
=== 1950 ===
- APRA coup d'état in Indonesia

=== 1951 ===
- 1951 Panamanian coup d'état: In a second coup, Arnulfo Arias was overthrown following a popular uprising supported by the National Guard.
- Manhattan Rebellion in Thailand: A coup attempt by officers of the Royal Thai Navy against the government of Prime Minister Plaek Phibunsongkhram failed on 29–30 June.
- Silent Coup (also called the Radio Coup) in Thailand: The Army-led National Military Council announced the dissolution of parliament, reinstatement of the 1932 constitution, and formation of a provisional government on 29 November.
- Rawalpindi conspiracy in Pakistan: An unsuccessful coup attempt, planned by Major-General Akbar Khan of the Pakistani army against the government of Liaquat Ali Khan.
- Argentina: A military coup attempt against Juan Perón was unsuccessful.
- Bolivia: President Mamerto Urriolagoitía enacted a self-coup, known as the Mamertazo, and resigned in favor of General Hugo Ballivián in order to prevent elected reformist Víctor Paz Estenssoro from taking office.

=== 1952 ===
- Bolivian National Revolution: General Hugo Ballivián was overthrown by Hernán Siles Zuazo, who then ceded command to Víctor Paz Estenssoro. Paz had won the 1951 election, but was prevented from assuming office by a self-coup.
- Egyptian revolution of 1952: A group of army officers led by Mohammed Naguib and Gamal Abdel Nasser overthrew King Farouk and the Muhammad Ali dynasty.
- 1952 Cuban coup d'état: Fulgencio Batista led a bloodless coup to topple the democratically elected government.

=== 1953 ===
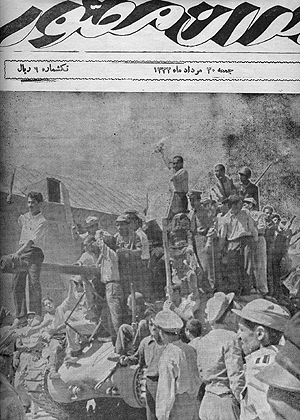
Events of the 1953 Iranian coup d'état

- 1953 Iranian coup d'état: A coup, jointly led by the United States and United Kingdom and codenamed Operation Ajax, overthrew Prime Minister Mohammed Mosaddeq.
- 1953 Pakistani constitutional coup: Governor-General Malik Ghulam Muhammad, supported by Field Marshal Ayub Khan, dismissed the prime minister and dissolved the Constituent Assembly.
- 1953 Colombian coup d'état: A coup led by army general Gustavo Rojas Pinilla ousted President Laureano Gómez from the power.

=== 1954 ===
- 1954 Guatemalan coup d'état: The democratically elected government of Colonel Jacobo Arbenz Guzmán was ousted by Colonel Carlos Castillo Armas in an operation organized by the American Central Intelligence Agency and codenamed Operation PBSuccess.
- 1954 Paraguayan coup d'état: A military coup brings Alfredo Stroessner to power.
- Coup d'état of Yanaon: A coup d'état led by Dadala Raphael Ramanayya overthrew French rule in Yanaon, a French colony in India.

=== 1955 ===
TV Senado video on Lott's countercoup (English subtitles)

- Brazil: A counter-coup led by marshal Henrique Teixeira Lott overthrew the government of Carlos Luz and prevented a coup against the elected president Juscelino Kubitschek.
- Revolución Libertadora in Argentina: A military coup overthrew President Juan Perón.
- Yemen: An attempted coup was led by Colonel Ahmad Yahya al-Thulaya, but ended in failure.

=== 1956 ===
- Cuba: A military coup attempt, led by Colonel Ramón Barquín against President Fulgencio Batista, was unsuccessful.
- 1956 Honduran coup d'état: A military coup led by military junta successfully ousted Julio Lozano Díaz from power.

=== 1957 ===
- 1957 Colombian coup d'état: The military supported strikes and student riots, and deposed Gustavo Rojas Pinilla, giving power to the Colombian Military Junta and chairman Gabriel París Gordillo.
- Fatti di Rovereta in San Marino: A quasi-coup led to the coexistence of two governments for a month.
- 1957 coup in Thailand: A coup by members of the Royal Thai Army, under the command of Field Marshal Sarit Thanarat, resulted in the ouster and exile of Plaek Phibunsongkhram.
- Anti-Party Group coup attempt in the Soviet Union: A group of leaders within the Communist Party of the Soviet Union, who would later be dubbed the "Anti-Party Group" by Premier Nikita Khrushchev, unsuccessfully attempted to depose Khrushchev as General Secretary of the Party.
- Overthrow of provisional president Daniel Fignolé in Haiti.
- 1957 Sudanese coup attempt: occurred after one year of independence in 1956, a group of army officers and students from the Sudanese Military College led by Abdel Rahman Ismail Kabeida, led a coup attempted against Prime Minister Abdallah Khalil and the Sovereignty Council.
- Guatemala: A military coup overthrew Luis Arturo González López, and installed a three-man junta headed by Óscar Mendoza Azurdia.
- 1957 alleged Jordanian military coup attempt

=== 1958 ===
- 1958 Venezuelan coup d'état: After three weeks of protests, the Venezuelan military removed Marcos Pérez Jiménez and installed Wolfgang Larrazábal, commander of the Venezuelan Navy.
- 1958 Pakistani military coup: Army Chief and Defence Minister General Ayub Khan led a military coup to overthrow the government of Iskander Mirza.
- 14 July Revolution in Iraq: The Hashemite monarchy was overthrown and the Iraqi Republic was established, with Abd al-Karim Qasim as prime minister.
- May 1958 crisis in France: General Jacques Massu took over Algiers and threatened to invade Paris unless Charles de Gaulle became head of state.
- July 1958 Haitian coup attempt: An attempted against François Duvalier was led by Alix Pasquet.
- 1958 Sudanese coup d'état: A bloodless self-coup on 17 November 1958 orchestrated by Prime Minister Abdallah Khalil and Lieutenant General Ibrahim Abboud.

=== 1959 ===
- 1959 Mosul uprising in Iraq: A coup attempt by Arab nationalists against Prime Minister Abd al-Karim Qasim failed.
- Aragarças Revolt in Brazil: Air Force military hijacked a civilian airplane and attempted a coup against Juscelino Kubitschek.
- Cuban Revolution: A successful coup against Fulgencio Batista, led by Fidel Castro, established a communist-ruled Cuba.
- 1959 Laotian coup: Phoumi Nosavan took control of Laos in a bloodless coup.
- 1959 Sudanese coup attempt: was on 9 November 1959 where a group of military officers attempted a coup to overthrow Lieutenant General Ibrahim Abboud. The coup attempt failed and conspirators were court martialed and the leaders were hanged.
- Bangkok Plot: an attempt to overthrow Norodom Sihanouk of Cambodia.

== 1960–1969 ==
=== 1960 ===
- 1960 Turkish coup d'état: A coup against the Democrat Party government resulted in the institution of the Turkish Constitution of 1961.
- First Mobutu coup in the Democratic Republic of the Congo: A bloodless coup launched by Joseph-Désiré Mobutu replaced both President Joseph Kasa-Vubu and Prime Minister Patrice Lumumba with a College of Commissionaires-General, consisting of a panel of university graduates led by Justin Marie Bomboko.
- 1960 Ethiopian coup attempt: A group failed to overthrow Emperor Haile Selassie during a state visit.
- 1960 Laotian coups: Phoumi Nosavan, who came to power after a coup the previous year, was overthrown in August 1960 by his former ally Kong Le. A three-way conflict ensued, and an attempt by Kouprasith Abhay to seize power from Kong Le failed. Following the Battle of Vientiane, Phoumi Nosavan regained power.
- 1960 Salvadoran coup d'état: On 26 October, José María Lemus was overthrown by the Junta of Government.
- 1960 Nepal coup d'état in Nepal: On 15 December, King Mahendra of Nepal dismissed the cabinet of B. P. Koirala and imprisoned him.
- 1960 South Vietnamese coup attempt

=== 1961 ===
- 1961 Salvadoran coup d'état: On 25 January, the Civic-Military Directory overthrew the Junta of Government.
- Coup of Gitarama in Rwanda
- May 16 coup in South Korea: Park Chung Hee led a coup, ending the Second Republic of South Korea and establishing the Supreme Council for National Reconstruction.
- Sanmu incident in Japan: Right-wing extremists from the Japan Self-Defense Forces attempted a coup, but were foiled by the National Police Agency.
- Algiers putsch of 1961 in France: In the midst of the Algerian War, four retired Army generals failed to overthrow president Charles de Gaulle, who himself came to power through the May 1958 crisis.
- 1961 revolt in Somalia: A group of military officers failed in an attempt to dismantle the union of the two states of Somaliland and Somalia.
- 1961 Lebanese coup attempt: A group of Syrian Social Nationalist Party loyalists led an attempted coup against President Fouad Chehab.
- 1961 Syrian coup d'état: A group of separatists launched military coup that led to separation of Syria from the United Arab Republic (Egypt).

=== 1962 ===
- 1962 Ceylonese coup attempt: Christian officers failed to overthrow the government of Prime Minister Sirimavo Bandaranaike.
- 1962 Turkish coup attempt: Staff Colonel Talât Aydemir, the Commander of the Turkish Military Academy, and his associates attempted a coup against Prime Minister İsmet İnönü.
- 1962 Burmese coup d'état: A coup led by General Ne Win overthrew the constitutionally elected government of Prime Minister U Nu.
- 1962 Peruvian coup d'état: Ricardo Pérez Godoy overthrew Manuel Prado Ugarteche.
- Coup of 29 March 1962 in Argentina: President Arturo Frondizi was overthrown by the military while abroad, and José María Guido became president.
- 26 September Revolution in North Yemen: A military coup overthrew Imam Muhammad al-Badr, resulting in the abolition of the Yemeni monarchy and the formation of the Yemen Arab Republic. The coup started the North Yemen Civil War.
- Coup d'état of South Kasai in the Democratic Republic of the Congo: During the Congo Crisis, a pro-Léopoldville coup ended Albert Kalonji's secessionist rule in South Kasai.
- 1962 Syrian coup attempt: Tensions between Nazim al-Qudsi and Abdul Karim al-Nahlawi led to a failed coup attempt by the latter.
- 1962 Senegalese coup attempt

=== 1963 ===
- 1963 Guatemalan coup d'état: Miguel Ydígoras Fuentes was overthrown by the military. Enrique Peralta Azurdia took power and established the Institutional Democratic Party until elections took place in 1966.
- 1963 Dominican coup d'état: The military overthrew President Juan Bosch in September 1963, only seven months into his term as the country's first democratically elected president. Bosch was replaced by a junta until it was overthrown in 1965.
- 1963 Turkish coup attempt: A military coup attempt failed.
- 1963 South Vietnamese coup: A group of officers in the Army of the Republic of Vietnam, supported by the United States, deposed President Ngô Đình Diệm and the Personalist Labor Revolutionary Party.
- 1963 Ecuadorian coup d'état: A military junta deposed Carlos Julio Arosemena Monroy.
- 1963 Togolese coup d'état: Coup leaders including Emmanuel Bodjollé, Étienne Eyadéma (later Gnassingbé Eyadéma), and Kléber Dadjo took over government buildings, arrested most of the cabinet, and assassinated Togo's first president, Sylvanus Olympio, outside the American embassy in Lomé. Nicolas Grunitzky and Antoine Meatchi, both exiled political opponents of Olympio, formed a new government.
- 1963 Dahomeyan coup d'état: Christophe Soglo took control of the Republic of Dahomey (later Benin).
- Ramadan Revolution (also known as the 8 February Revolution) in Iraq: The Ba'ath Party's Iraqi wing overthrew Prime Minister Abd al-Karim Qasim.
- 1963 Syrian coup d'état (also known as the 8 March Revolution): The military committee of the Syrian Regional Branch of the Ba'ath Party seized power, overthrowing President Nazim al-Qudsi and beginning Ba'athist rule in Syria.
- 1963 Honduran coup d'état: The military overthrew the democratic government ten days before a scheduled election. Oswaldo López Arellano took power from Ramón Villeda Morales, preventing the likely succession of Modesto Rodas Alvarado.
- November 1963 Iraqi coup d'état: Pro-Nasserist officers within the Ba'ath Party led a successful coup.

=== 1964 ===
- Piano Solo in Italy: A plot for a coup was created in 1964 at the request of president Antonio Segni.
- Zanzibar Revolution: Revolutionaries overthrow Sultan Jamshid bin Abdullah, ending the Sultanate of Zanzibar and establishing the People's Republic of Zanzibar and Pemba.
- 1964 Brazilian coup d'état: Humberto Castelo Branco was installed as president after a military coup overthrew João Goulart.
- January 1964 South Vietnamese coup: A military coup overthrew Dương Văn Minh's military junta.
- September 1964 South Vietnamese coup attempt
- December 1964 South Vietnamese coup
- 1964 Bolivian coup d'état: Vice President René Barrientos and General Alfredo Ovando Candía overthrew President Víctor Paz Estenssoro.
- 1964 Gabonese coup d'état: Military officers overthrew President Léon M'ba and established a provisional government with Jean-Hilaire Aubame as president. The provisional government was toppled shortly afterwards with the help of France, and M'ba was reinstated.
- 1964 Laotian coups: Policemen of the Directorate of National Coordination overthrew the Royal Lao Government in April, but the coup was overturned five days later by U.S. Ambassador Leonard Unger. In August, a second coup was attempted when Defense Minister Phoumi Nosavan tried to take over Vientiane with a training battalion; this was quickly quashed by the Royal Laotian Army.

=== 1965 ===
- 1965 Bulgarian coup attempt: A conspiracy by officials in the Bulgarian Communist Party and officers in the Bulgarian People's Army to overthrow Todor Zhivkov was uncovered, and foiled before the coup could be carried out.
- 1965 Algerian coup d'état: Defense Minister Colonel Houari Boumedienne took power.
- Indonesia: Members of the Indonesian National Armed Forces calling themselves the 30 September Movement began a coup attempt and assassinated six Indonesian Army generals. The coup failed, and was blamed on the Communist Party of Indonesia, which led to a mass purge of actual and suspected members of the party and sympathizers. While who is behind the initial coup is still being debated, Major General Suharto took advantage of the chaos to exile First President Sukarno and install a dictatorship that lasted until 1998.
- Second Mobutu coup in the Democratic Republic of the Congo: Joseph-Desire Mobutu seized power in a bloodless coup after Parliament twice refused to confirm Évariste Kimba as prime minister.
- 1965 Burundian coup attempt: A group of Hutu officers from the Burundian military wounded the Prime Minister, but ultimately failed to overthrow the government.
- Saint-Sylvestre coup d'état in the Central African Republic: Army leader Jean-Bédel Bokassa and his officers staged a coup against the government of President David Dacko.
- 1965 Laotian coups: Two simultaneous and independent January coups failed. One was led by General Phoumi Nosavan, who had participated in four prior coup attempts against the Royal Lao Government; the other was led by Colonel Bounleuth Saycocie.
- 1965 South Vietnamese coup

=== 1966 ===
- 1966 Ghanaian coup d'état: The Ghana Armed Forces, led by Colonel Emmanuel Kwasi Kotoka, overthrew Kwame Nkrumah while he was abroad. The National Liberation Council was formed, and Lieutenant General Joseph Arthur Ankrah was installed as chairman.
- 1966 Upper Voltan coup d'état: On 3 January, Sangoulé Lamizana overthrew Maurice Yaméogo.
- 1966 Syrian coup d'état: The ruling National Command of the Ba'ath Party were removed from power by a union of the party's Military Committee and the Regional Command, under the leadership of Salah Jadid.
- 1966 Nigerian coup d'état: In January, mutinous soldiers led by Chukwuma Kaduna Nzeogwu and Emmanuel Ifeajuna killed 22 people including the Prime Minister and many senior politicians and Army officers. The General Officer Commanding the Army, Johnson Aguiyi-Ironsi, was compelled to take control of the government.
- 1966 Dhabyani coup d'état: Shakhbut bin Sultan Al Nahyan was deposed in a bloodless coup and replaced by his brother, Zayed bin Sultan Al Nahyan.
- July 1966 Burundian coup d'état
- November 1966 Burundian coup d'état
- 1966 Nigerian counter-coup: In a reaction to the January coup, Johnson Aguiyi-Ironsi was assassinated, and conspirators appointed Yakubu Gowon as head of state.
- Argentine Revolution: President Arturo Illia was overthrown by military forces supporting the leadership of General Juan Carlos Onganía, who became de facto president.
- 1966 alleged Ceylonese coup attempt (also known as the Bathroom coup): 31 suspects, including the commander of the army, were arrested for allegedly plotting to overthrow the government of Dudley Senanayake. They were later unanimously acquitted.
- 1966 Laotian coup d'état: General Thao Ma, who wished to reserve the Royal Lao Air Force for strictly military use, was forced into exile by fellow generals angling to use the transports for smuggling opium and gold.
- 1966 Republic of the Congo coup attempt
- Saudi Arabia: A coup attempt against King Faisal failed.

=== 1967 ===
- The January Storm in China: During the Cultural Revolution, A group of Maoist rebels overthrew the Shanghai Municipal Committee and established a commune. The commune eventually collapsed due to lack of external support.
- Operation Guitar Boy in Ghana: A coup attempt led by a group of junior officers of the Ghana Armed Forces resulted in the assassination of Lieutenant General Emmanuel Kwasi Kotoka, Chief of the Defence Staff. However, the coup itself was unsuccessful.
- 1967 Greek coup d'état: A group of colonels overthrew the caretaker government a month before scheduled elections which Georgios Papandreou's Centre Union was favoured to win.
- 1967 Togolese coup d'état: In a bloodless coup, Gnassingbé Eyadéma overthrew Nicolas Grunitzky and began a 38-year rule.
- 1967 Sierra Leonean coups d'état: On 21 March, Brigadier David Lansana led a bloodless military coup against Prime Minister Siaka Stevens, who had taken office hours earlier after a closely contested election. Lansana declared himself interim leader, placing Stevens under house arrest and later releasing him, at which point Stevens went into exile. On 23 March, Brigadier Andrew Juxon-Smith led a group of military officers to seize control of the government, arrest Lansana, and suspend the constitution. They established the National Reformation Council and made Juxon-Smith the chairman.
- Biafra: Army colonel Victor Banjo plotted a coup against President Odumegwu Ojukwu. The coup plot was uncovered by an informant, and Banjo and two other conspirators were executed on 22 September.
- 1967 North Yemen coup d'état: In November, a coup led to the removal of Abdullah al-Sallal.
- Transition to the New Order in Indonesia: Suharto overthrew Sukarno in a long and gradual military coup process, beginning the New Order and Suharto's 31-year presidency.
- Kapsan faction incident: Pak Kum-chol failed to overthrow Kim Il Sung.

=== 1968 ===
- 1968 Panamanian coup d'état: In a third coup, Arnulfo Arias was ousted by the military. The coup began a 21-year military rule.
- 17 July Revolution in Iraq: A bloodless coup led by Ahmed Hassan al-Bakr, Abd ar-Razzaq an-Naif, and Abd ar-Rahman al-Dawud ousted President Abdul Rahman Arif and Prime Minister Tahir Yahya and brought the Iraqi Regional Branch of the Ba'ath Party to power.
- 1968 Peruvian coup d'état: General Juan Velasco Alvarado led a coup against President Fernando Belaúnde, who established the Revolutionary Government of the Armed Forces of Peru.
- Sergeants' Coup in Sierra Leone: A military coup against Brigadier Andrew Juxon-Smith by Brigadier John Amadu Bangura restored Siaka Stevens as prime minister.
- 1968 Malian coup d'état: Lieutenant Moussa Traoré led a bloodless military coup against President Modibo Keïta.
- 1968 Republic of the Congo coup d'état

=== 1969 ===
- 1969 Libyan coup d'état (also known as the al-Fateh Revolution or the 1 September Revolution): Muammar al-Gaddafi led a group of military officers to overthrow the monarchy of King Idris, resulting in the abolition of the Libyan monarchy and establishment of the Libyan Arab Republic.
- 1969 Sudanese coup d'état: Colonel Gaafar Nimeiry led a military coup to overthrow the government of President Ismail al-Azhari.
- Brazilian military junta of 1969: Pedro Aleixo, the legal vice president of Brazil, was replaced by a military junta after Artur da Costa e Silva suffered a stroke.
- 1969 Saudi Arabian coup attempt: A failed coup d'état, planned by numerous high-ranking members of the Royal Saudi Air Force, resulted in King Faisal ordering the arrest of hundreds of military officers.
- 1969 Bolivian coup d'état: General Alfredo Ovando Candía overthrew President Luis Adolfo Siles Salinas.
- 1969 Somali coup d'état: Military officers led by Siad Barre overthrew President Sheikh Mukhtar Mohamed Hussein and Prime Minister Muhammad Haji Ibrahim Egal, leading to Barre's 21-year-long military rule and the imposition of an authoritarian government.
- 1969 Libyan coup attempt
- 1969 Panamanian coup attempt (also known as Loyalty Day): On December 16, a group of loyalists officers, including Manuel Noriega, warned General Omar Torrijos of a coup plot during his Mexico trip, securing his return to power in Panama.

== 1970–1979 ==
=== 1970 ===
- Black Prince conspiracy in Libya
- Corrective Revolution in Syria: Hafez al-Assad overthrew the government of Salah Jadid in a bloodless coup.
- Bolivia: A junta of commanders of the army enact a coup, but the highly polarized military forces were split. President Alfredo Ovando Candía sought asylum in a foreign embassy, believing all hope was lost, but leftist military forces reasserted control under the leadership of General Juan José Torres. Embarrassed by his quick abandonment of the fight and exhausted by a grueling 13 months in office, Ovando agreed to leave the presidency in Torres's hands.
- 1970 Haitian coup attempt: An attempted against François Duvalier was led by Octave Cayard.
- 1970 Omani coup d'état: Qaboos bin Said, with the support of the British, ousted his father Said bin Taimur in a bloodless coup during the Dhofar Rebellion.
- Golpe Borghese (Borghese Coup) in Italy: A coup plot in Italy by neo-fascist groups failed to materialize.
- Mishima Incident in Japan: After barricading the headquarters of the Eastern Command of the Japan Self-Defense Forces and tying the commandant to a chair, Yukio Mishima, the leader of the Tatenokai, delivered a speech to soldiers gathered outside, intending to inspire a coup. After this failed, Mishima committed seppuku.
- 1970 Cambodian coup d'état: Chief of State Norodom Sihanouk was ousted in a military coup, and Prime Minister Lon Nol took power.
- Chile: With the United States Central Intelligence Agency strongly invested in Salvador Allende not coming to power in the 1970 Chilean presidential election, the CIA discussed several possible coup options.

=== 1971 ===
- 1971 Turkish military memorandum: The Chief of the General Staff of the Turkish Armed Forces delivered a memorandum demanding the formation of a "strong and credible government, which will neutralise the current anarchical situation".
- 1971 Ugandan coup d'état: A military coup led by General Idi Amin overthrew the government of President Milton Obote while he was abroad, and installed Amin as dictator.
- Thailand: Prime Minister Thanom Kittikachorn launched a self-coup against his own government, dissolving parliament and appointing himself Chairman of the National Executive Council.
- 1971 Sudanese coup d'état: Major Hashem al Atta leads a short-lived coup against President Jaafar Nimeiry. Several days later, Nimeiry loyalists enacted a counter-coup, toppling Atta's government and executing him.
- Project 571 in China: An alleged coup plot was developed against Mao Zedong by the supporters of Lin Biao, then vice-chairman of the Chinese Communist Party. Any attempts that may have been made at the coup ultimately failed.
- 1971 Moroccan coup attempt: A coup attempt was organized by General Mohamed Medbouh and Colonel M'hamed Ababou and carried out by cadets during a diplomatic function at King Hassan II's summer palace in Rabat. The King and important guests were detained, and plotters took control of Rabat's radio station to say that the king had been killed and a republic had been founded. Royalist troops regained the palace and ended the coup attempt.
- 1971 Bolivian coup d'état: General Hugo Banzer overthrew President Juan José Torres and established a military dictatorship.
- 1971 Pakistan Military Officer's Revolt: Overthrow of Yahya Khan by officers

=== 1972 ===
- Ghana: Colonel Ignatius Kutu Acheampong led a coup to overthrow the democratically elected government of the Progress Party and its leader Kofi Abrefa Busia on 13 January.
- 1972 Ecuadorian coup d'état
- 1972 Sharjawi coup d'état attempt: Saqr bin Sultan Al Qasimi led a coup that killed Khalid bin Muhammad Al Qasimi, but failed to seize power in the Emirate of Sharjah.
- Martial law declared in the Philippines: President Ferdinand Marcos declared martial law in a self-coup, beginning 14 years of authoritarian rule.
- October Yusin (or October Restoration) in South Korea: President Park Chung Hee assumed dictatorial powers in a self-coup on 17 October.
- 1972 Dahomeyan coup d'état: Major Mathieu Kérékou led a coup that overthrew the Dahomeyan Presidential Council.
- 1972 Honduran coup d'état: On 4 December, General Oswaldo López Arellano led the Armed Forces of Honduras to oust President Ramón Ernesto Cruz Uclés after only 18 months in power.
- 1972 Moroccan coup attempt

=== 1973 ===
- El Tanquetazo in Chile: Lieutenant Colonel Roberto Souper launched a failed coup against President Salvador Allende.
- 1973 Afghan coup d'état: Former Prime Minister Mohammed Daoud Khan overthrew King Mohammed Zahir Shah and established a Republic.
- 1973 Pakistan coup attempt: Fifty-nine military officers were arrested after allegedly plotting to overthrow the government of Zulfikar Ali Bhutto.
- 1973 Rwandan coup d'état: Army Chief of Staff Juvénal Habyarimana overthrew President Gregoire Kayibanda in a military coup.
- 1973 Chilean coup d'état: On 11 September, General Augusto Pinochet, with support from the CIA, led a group of military officers to seize power from democratically elected President Salvador Allende, and installed a junta headed by Pinochet.
- 1973 Uruguayan coup d'état: President Juan María Bordaberry, with the assistance of a junta of military generals, dissolved Parliament in a self-coup.
- Greece: On 25 November, Army hardliners led by Brigadier Dimitrios Ioannidis overthrew the hitherto leader of the junta, President Georgios Papadopoulos.
- 1973 Laotian coup attempt: Exiled General Thao Ma took over a Laotian airfield and led air strikes on the office and home of General Kouprasith Abhay in an attempt to stave off a communist coalition government. Royalist forces retook the airfield, and shot down and executed Thao Ma when he returned after the bombings, which had failed to kill Kouprasith.
- Moulay Bouazza plot

=== 1974 ===
- 1974 Upper Voltan coup d'état: In a self-coup, President Sangoulé Lamizana dismissed the prime minister Gérard Kango Ouédraogo and dissolved the National Assembly.
- Carnation Revolution in Portugal: A coup organized by the Armed Forces Movement ended the dictatorship of Marcello Caetano.
- 1974 Cypriot coup d'état: Members of the Cypriot National Guard overthrew President Makarios III and triggered an invasion by Turkey.
- Arube uprising in Uganda: A coup attempt against Idi Amin was led by Brigadier Charles Arube.
- 1974 North Yemen coup d'état (also known as the June 13 Corrective Movement): A bloodless coup deposed Abdul Rahman al-Eryani, and brought Ibrahim al-Hamdi to power.
- 1974 Ethiopian coup d'état: The Derg, a communist junta led by General Aman Andom and Mengistu Haile Mariam, enacted a coup and overthrew Haile Selassie.
- Bolivia: Hugo Banzer solidifies his regime with a self-coup formulated in Supreme Decree 11947. A military-only government and ban on political activities are declared.
- 1974 Nigerien coup d'etat: Seyni Kountché overthrows Hamani Diori.

=== 1975 ===
- Comoros: Mercenary Bob Denard, on orders from Jacques Foccart, overthrew President Ahmed Abdallah.
- 1975 Nigerian coup d'état: A faction of junior military officers overthrew Yakubu Gowon and appointed Brigadier Murtala Muhammed as head of state.
- Pyjamas coup in Greece: A failed conspiracy by far-right military officers to re-establish the Greek junta. The term "pyjamas coup" was coined by then-Defense Minister Evangelos Averoff.
- 1975 Ecuadorian coup attempt
- 1975 Indian Emergency: Self-coup by Prime Minister Indira Gandhi.
- 15 August 1975 Bangladesh coup d'état: Army officers killed Sheikh Mujibur Rahman, and Khondaker Mostaq Ahmad announced the formation of a new government with himself as leader.
- 3 November 1975 Bangladesh coup d'état: General Khaled Mosharraf led a military coup to overthrown Khondaker Mostaq Ahmed, who had come to power in a coup months earlier.
- 7 November 1975 Bangladesh coup d'état: Left wing army personnel killed General Khaled Mosharraf and paved the way for Ziaur Rahman to take power. Rahman would go on to survive as many as 21 assassination and coup attempts until his 1981 assassination.
- 1975 Chadian coup d'état: Members of the military overthrew and killed President François Tombalbaye and replaced him with Noël Milarew Odingar.
- 1975 Australian constitutional crisis (also known as "the Dismissal"): A constitutional crisis occurred. It has been referred to by some, including author John Pilger, as a "soft coup" due to allegations of involvement by British and American intelligence agencies in the removal of then-Prime Minister Gough Whitlam.
- 1975 Sudanese coup attempt: Led by army officers linked to the Sudanese Communist Party. The coup was quickly crushed by Vice President Mohamed al-Baghir Ahmed. The coup leader, Brigadier Hassan Hussein Osman, was court martialed and executed.
- Coup of 25 November 1975 in Portugal: A coup attempt led by far-left military units failed. The current Portuguese Constitution was approved and came into force five months later.

=== 1976 ===
- Ecuador: A bloodless military coup removed Guillermo Rodríguez from power.
- 1976 Central African Republic coup attempt: On 3 February, coup plotters orchestrated an assassination attempt on Jean-Bédel Bokassa at Bangui airport by throwing a grenade in his direction, but the plan failed when the grenade did not detonate.
- 1976 Nigerian coup attempt: Military officers led by Lieutenant Colonel Buka Suka Dimka assassinated General Murtala Muhammed, but failed to enact a coup.
- Al-Ahdab coup in Lebanon (also known as the Television coup): On 11 March, Brigadier General Aziz Al-Ahdab staged an abortive coup, which he announced via Beirut's TV station, and which demanded the resignation of President Suleiman Frangieh.
- 1976 Argentine coup d'état: A military coup overthrew Isabel Perón and led to the National Reorganization Process.
- China: A bloodless coup overthrew the Gang of Four, which had been led by Chairman Mao Zedong's widow, Jiang Qing.
- Coup in Thailand: A military coup on the evening of the 6 October 1976 massacre installed an ultra-right government with Thanin Kraivichien as prime minister.
- 1976 Sudanese coup attempt: Fighting between followers of Sadiq al-Mahdi, armed and trained by Libya, against President Gaafar al-Nimeiry's government in Khartoum.
- 1976 Burundian coup d'état

=== 1977 ===
- 1977 Pakistani military coup: Chief of Army Staff General Muhammad Zia-ul-Haq led a coup to overthrow the government of Prime Minister Zulfikar Ali Bhutto.
- 1977 Seychelles coup d'état: Supporters of the United Seychelles party overthrew President James Mancham and installed France-Albert René as president.
- March 1977 Thai coup attempt: A group of Royal Thai Army officers failed to overthrow Prime Minister Thanin Kraivichien.
- October 1977 Thai coup d'état: General Kriangsak Chamanan led a bloodless military coup against Prime Minister Thanin Kraivichien.
- 1977 Sudan Juba coup attempt: An unsuccessful coup, led by 12 Air Force members who had previously been members of Anyanya.
- Operation Mafuta Mingi in Uganda: A coup attempt against Idi Amin was led by Uganda Liberation Movement.
- 1977 Angolan coup attempt

=== 1978 ===
- 1978 Comorian coup d'état
- 1978 North Yemeni coup attempt: A coup attempt against President Ali Abdullah Saleh failed.
- Saur Revolution (also known as the April Revolution) in Afghanistan: The Soviet-backed People's Democratic Party of Afghanistan overthrew and killed President Mohammed Daoud Khan, and Nur Muhammad Taraki took power.
- 1978 Somali coup attempt: A group of military officials failed to overthrow President Siad Barre. Most of the plotters, including coup leader Colonel Mohamed Osman Irro, were summarily executed. However, some prominent officials, including Abdullahi Yusuf Ahmed, survived and formed the first resistance group against Barre known as the Somali Salvation Democratic Front.
- 1978 Mauritanian coup d'état: Chief of Army Staff Colonel Mustafa Ould Salek led a bloodless military coup that ousted long-time President Moktar Ould Daddah.
- Operation Galaxia in Spain: A plot to stop the Spanish transition to democracy was planned for 17 November. However, some officers present at the planning informed their superiors, and the plan was thwarted.
- Bolivia: After the annulment of a fraudulent election in which term-limited Hugo Banzer ensured the win of his surrogate, Juan Pereda, then denounced Pereda and blamed him for the rigged election, Pereda launched a coup and was sworn in as president. Pereda himself was overthrown several months later by David Padilla, who briefly served as president until new elections could be held.

=== 1979 ===
- Iranian Revolution: Shah Mohammad Reza Pahlavi and the Pahlavi dynasty were overthrown, and Ayatollah Ruhollah Khomeini took power.
- Coup d'état of December Twelfth in South Korea: Major General Chun Doo-hwan led a coup against Choi Kyu-hah, and early the next year installed himself as president.
- Bolivia: Alberto Natusch enacted a coup against the interim government of Wálter Guevara, but resigned after just sixteen days. As a face-saving measure, Natusch secured an agreement that Guevara wouldn't return as president, and Lidia Gueiler became interim president.
- 1979 Mauritanian coup d'état: The bloodless military coup was led by Colonel Ahmed Ould Bouceif and Colonel Mohamed Khouna Ould Haidalla, who seized effective power from the President, Colonel Mustafa Ould Salek.
- June 4th revolution in Ghana: Jerry John Rawlings and others led a military uprising that removed leader Fred Akuffo from power, following an unsuccessful attempt the month before.
- 1979 Equatorial Guinea coup d'état: Deputy defense minister Teodoro Obiang Nguema Mbasogo overthrew his uncle, Francisco Macías Nguema, and established the Supreme Military Council.
- Operation Barracuda and the overthrow of the Central African Empire: A French-led coup overthrew Emperor Jean-Bédel Bokassa on 20 September, ending the Central African Empire and restoring the Central African Republic with David Dacko as president.
- 1979 Salvadoran coup d'état: Military officers overthrew President Carlos Humberto Romero and established the Revolutionary Government Junta of El Salvador.
- Operation Storm-333: Babrak Karmal overthrows Hafizullah Amin and established a pro-Soviet, Parcham-dominated government.

== 1980–1989 ==
=== 1980 ===
- 1980 Pakistan coup attempt
- Coup d'état of May Seventeenth in South Korea: On 17 May, General Chun Doo-hwan forced the Cabinet to extend martial law to the whole nation, which had previously not applied to Jeju Province. On 18 May, citizens of Gwangju rose up against Chun's dictatorship and took control of the city. In the course of the uprising, citizens took up arms to defend themselves, but were ultimately crushed by the army. On 20 May 1980, Chun and Roh Tae-woo ordered the National Assembly to be dissolved by deploying troops in the chamber.
- 1980 Mauritanian coup d'état: Colonel Mohamed Khouna Ould Haidalla led a bloodless military coup that ousted President Mohamed Mahmoud Ould Louly.
- 1980 Bolivian coup d'état: General Luis García Meza enacted a violent military coup against his cousin, President Lidia Gueiler, who subsequently fled the country. The coup began the rule of the first Junta of Commanders of the Armed Forces.
- 1980 Turkish coup d'état: The National Security Council, headed by Chief of the General Staff Kenan Evren, declared a coup d'état on state TV. The Council then extended martial law throughout the country, abolished the Parliament and the government, suspended the Constitution, and banned all political parties and trade unions.
- 1980 Liberian coup d'état: A military coup led by Master Sergeant Samuel Doe overthrew the government led by President William Tolbert, ending 102 years of continuous rule by the True Whig Party.
- 1980 Guinea-Bissau coup d'état: Prime Minister and commander of the armed forces, João Bernardo Vieira, overthrew the government.
- 1980 Surinamese coup d'état (also known as the Sergeants' Coup): A group of military officers, led by Dési Bouterse, overthrew the government of Prime Minister Henck Arron. The coup began a military dictatorship that lasted until 1991.
- 1980 Upper Voltan coup d'état: Colonel Saye Zerbo led a military coup and overthrew President Sangoulé Lamizana.
- Nojeh coup plot in Iran: A plot by military officers to overthrow the newly established Islamic Republic and its government of Abolhassan Banisadr and Ruhollah Khomeini was largely thwarted by the arrest of hundreds of officers at Nojeh Air Base.
- Operation Quartz

=== 1981 ===
- 1981 Spanish coup attempt (also known as 23-F or the Tejerazo): Lieutenant-Colonel Antonio Tejero attempted a coup in which members of the military entered the Congress of Deputies during the vote to elect a President of the Government. The officers held the parliamentarians and ministers hostage for 18 hours, but surrendered the next morning without killing anyone.
- 1981 Gambian coup attempt: Members of the Gambia Socialist Revolutionary Party and disaffected staff of the Gambia Field Force led a failed coup against President Dawda Jawara, who was in the United Kingdom. The attempt was quashed by the Senegalese armed forces.
- Assassination of Ziaur Rahman in Bangladesh: A faction of officers of the Bangladesh Army assassinated President Ziaur Rahman, who had survived many prior assassination attempts. The army suppressed the coup, and Vice President Abdus Sattar became acting president.
- Suriname: Wilfred Hawker led an attempted coup against the government of Dési Bouterse, who had come to power in a coup the previous year. The coup failed, and Hawker was imprisoned and later executed.
- 1981 Central African Republic coup d'état: General André Kolingba overthrew President David Dacko, who was out of the country, in a bloodless coup.
- 1981 Ghanaian coup d'état: On 31 December, Flight Lieutenant Jerry Rawlings overthrew Hilla Limann and the People's National Party, and established the Provisional National Defence Council.
- 1981 Seychelles coup attempt (also known as the Seychelles affair or Operation Angela): A South African-orchestrated coup attempt failed to overthrow the government of Prime Minister France-Albert René and install the previous president James Mancham to power.
- Institution of martial law in Poland: General Wojciech Jaruzelski formed the Military Council of National Salvation and announced the institution of martial law.
- 1981 Bahraini coup attempt
- On December 11, 1981: the Argentine military overthrew Roberto Eduardo Viola, with Leopoldo Galtieri being appointed president one week later.

=== 1982 ===
- 1982 Guatemalan coup d'état: A group of military officers overthrew Fernando Romeo Lucas García, bringing Efraín Ríos Montt to power.
- 1982 Bangladeshi coup d'état: General Hussain Muhammad Ershad led a military coup to depose the civilian government, led by President Abdus Sattar, and install Ershad into power.
- 1982 Central African Republic coup attempt
- 1982 Kenyan coup attempt: An attempted military coup failed to overthrow the government of President Daniel arap Moi.
- Rambocus coup attempt in Suriname: Surendre Rambocus and Wilfred Hawker attempted a coup against the government of Dési Bouterse. The attempt failed, and the plotters were arrested and later executed.
- 1982 Upper Voltan coup d'état: Colonel Gabriel Yoryan Somé led a military coup to overthrow the regime of Colonel Saye Zerbo, installing Jean-Baptiste Ouédraogo as president.

=== 1983 ===
- 1983 Guatemalan coup d'état: A palace coup deposed Efraín Ríos Montt and brought Óscar Humberto Mejía Víctores to power.
- 1983 Upper Voltan coup attempt: A few months after the Somé-led coup deposed Zerbo, several army officers decided to kill members of the Council of Popular Salvation and restore Zerbo to power. The plotters were arrested before they were able to do so.
- 1983 Upper Voltan coup d'état: On 3 August, Captain Blaise Compaoré deposed President Jean-Baptiste Ouédraogo and installed Thomas Sankara as president.
- 1983 Nigerian coup d'état: Members of the military led a coup, ousting the democratically elected government of President Shehu Shagari. They installed Major General Muhammadu Buhari as leader of the Supreme Military Council, the country's new ruling body.
- Grenada: In a military coup, Deputy Prime Minister Maurice Bishop was placed under house arrest. Bishop, who enjoyed popularity among the Grenadian population, was freed by supporters, and Bishop and some of his co-conspirators were executed. After the execution, the People's Revolutionary Army (PRA) formed a military Marxist government with General Hudson Austin as chairman. The United States invaded Grenada shortly after.

=== 1984 ===
- 1984 Pakistan coup attempt
- 1984 Syrian coup attempt
- 1984 Cameroonian coup attempt: Some members of the Presidential Guard failed to overthrow President Paul Biya.
- 1984 Mauritanian coup d'état: Colonel Maaouya Ould Sid'Ahmed Taya rose to power after a bloodless coup that overthrew President Mohamed Khouna Ould Haidalla.
- 1984 Guinean coup d'état: Colonel Lansana Conté deposed Louis Lansana Beavogui and took power.
- 1984 Bolivian coup attempt: During an ultimately unsuccessful coup attempt, the military arrested President Hernán Siles Zuazo for ten hours.
- Romania: A tentative coup d'état planned in October failed when the military unit assigned to carry out the plan was sent to harvest maize instead.

=== 1985 ===
- 1985 Ugandan coup d'état: Brigadier Bazilio Olara-Okello and General Tito Okello led a coup against President Milton Obote. They briefly ruled the country via a military council, but after a few months of near chaos, Yoweri Museveni and the National Resistance Army took control.
- 1985 Nigerian coup d'état: Chief of Army Staff General Ibrahim Babangida led a military coup which replaced Major General Muhammadu Buhari, and replaced the Supreme Military Council with the Armed Forces Ruling Council.
- 1985 Sudanese coup d'état: Defense Minister and Armed Forces Commander-in-Chief, Field Marshal Abdel Rahman Swar al-Dahab, led a coup against the government of President Jaafar Nimeiry.

=== 1986 ===
- January 1986 Lebanese Forces coup
- Ugandan Bush War: After the decisive Battle of Kampala, Museveni was sworn as president.
- Anti-Duvalier protest movement: The Duvalier regime in Haiti collapsed, Henri Namphy took power as president.
- Philippines: A coup attempt led by Juan Ponce Enrile and Gregorio Honasan failed when President Ferdinand Marcos learned of it and arrested the leaders. However, it was one of the events that led to the People Power Revolution, which did eventually result in Marcos' fall from power.
- 1986 Lesotho coup d'état: General Justin Lekhanya led a coup that overthrew the long-time rule of Prime Minister Leabua Jonathan.
- 1986 Philippine coup attempts: Two attempted coups failed.

=== 1987 ===
- The Carapintada uprising in Argentina: Lieutenant Colonel Aldo Rico and Carapintada followers took up arms to make demands of the Argentine government. However, the public was sensitive to any military demands following decades of coups, and rallied around Alfonsin.
- 1987 Philippine coup attempts: Four attempted coups failed.
- 1987 Fijian coups d'état: Lieutenant Colonel Sitiveni Rabuka overthrew the government of Prime Minister Timoci Bavadra. After temporarily handing power to a council of ministers, in September that year, Rabuka seized control of the country again, deposed Queen Elizabeth II as head of state, and declared a republic.
- 1987 Burkina Faso coup d'état: On 15 October, President Thomas Sankara was assassinated in a coup, and coup leader Captain Blaise Compaoré was installed as president.
- 1987 Sharjawi coup attempt
- 1987 Tunisian coup d'état: Prime Minister Zine El Abidine Ben Ali overthrew President Habib Bourguiba.
- 1987 Burundian coup d'état
- 1987 Transkei coup d'état
- Sierra Leone: On 23 March, police reported that a group of conspirators, including Vice President Francis Minah, was plotting to assassinate President Joseph Saidu Momoh and stage a coup after they raided a house in Freetown and discovered a cache of weapons, including rocket launchers. Minah and seventeen other alleged conspirators were convicted of treason and sentenced to death.

=== 1988 ===
- SLORC coup in Burma: Following the 8888 Uprising, the State Law and Order Restoration Council (SLORC) enacted a bloody military coup and imposed martial law.
- Argentina: Aldo Rico, who had been imprisoned following a 1987 coup attempt, escaped prison and began a new attempt to overthrow President Raúl Alfonsín. Rico surrendered after a brief combat with the army.
- Argentina: Colonel Mohamed Alí Seineldín, backed by the Carapintadas, launched a coup attempt against President Alfonsin, but he and the other conspirators were jailed.
- 1988 Guatemalan coup attempt: On May 11, a faction of the army attempted a coup against President Vinicio Cerezo, but was unsuccessful.
- June 1988 Haitian coup d'état: Henri Namphy overthrew President Leslie Manigat and declared himself president.
- September 1988 Haitian coup d'état: Prosper Avril overthrew President Namphy, who had come to power in a coup only months earlier.
- 1988 Panamanian coup attempt: A coup was attempted against Manuel Noriega, but was suppressed.
- 1988 São Tomé and Príncipe coup attempt
- 1988 Maldives coup attempt: A group of Maldivians, assisted by mercenaries, gained control of the capital and major government buildings, but the coup ultimately failed after intervention by Indian armed forces.

=== 1989 ===
- 1989 Philippine coup attempt: Members of the Armed Forces of the Philippines belonging to the Reform the Armed Forces Movement (RAM) and soldiers loyal to former President Ferdinand Marcos nearly seized the presidential palace, but were defeated.
- 1989 Burkina Faso coup attempt: A coup was allegedly attempted by Jean-Baptiste Boukary Lingani, Henri Zongo, and others against President Blaise Compaoré. After the plot was discovered, alleged conspirators were arrested and summarily executed.
- 1989 Guatemalan coup attempt: A group of retired military officers attempted another coup against President Vinicio Cerezo, but was suppressed.
- 1989 Ethiopian coup attempt: While President Mengistu Haile Mariam was on a four-day state visit to East Germany, senior military officials attempted a coup and the Minister of Defense, Haile Giyorgis Habte Mariam, was killed. Mengistu quickly returned, and nine generals, including the air force commander and the army chief of staff, died as the coup was crushed.
- 1989 Paraguayan coup d'état (also known as La Noche de la Candelaria): General Andrés Rodríguez led a bloody coup against the regime of long-time leader Alfredo Stroessner.
- 1989 Sudanese coup d'état: Omar al-Bashir led a military coup on 30 June against the democratically elected government of Prime Minister Sadiq al-Mahdi and President Ahmed al-Mirghani.
- 1989 Panamanian coup attempt: Major Moisés Giroldi led a failed coup attempt, supported by a group of officers who had returned from a United Nations peacekeeping mission in Namibia. Although the plotters succeeded in capturing Panamanian dictator Manuel Noriega, the coup was quickly suppressed. Giroldi and nine others were executed, and another participant in the coup attempt died in prison after being tortured.

== 1990–1999 ==
=== 1990 ===
- 1990 Nigerian coup attempt: Major Gideon Orkar attempted to overthrow the government of General Ibrahim Babangida. Though successful in seizing military posts, a radio station, and the presidential residence, Orkar and others involved in the coup were captured by government troops, convicted of treason, and later executed.
- 1990 Sudanese coup attempt: A bloodless coup attempt against the RCCNS, the ruling military junta led by Lieutenant General Omar al-Bashir.
- 1990 Afghan coup attempt: General Shahnawaz Tanai attempted to overthrow President Mohammad Najibullah of the Republic of Afghanistan. The coup attempt failed and Tanai was forced to flee to Pakistan.
- 1990 Zambian coup attempt: Lieutenant Mwamba Luchembe rebelled against president Kenneth Kaunda, but failed to enact a coup.
- Jamaat al Muslimeen coup attempt in Trinidad and Tobago: Jamaat al Muslimeen, a radical Islamist group, held hostages (including Prime Minister A. N. R. Robinson and other government officials) at the Red House and at the headquarters of the state-owned Trinidad and Tobago Television (TTT). On 1 August, the insurgents surrendered.
- Argentina: Mohamed Alí Seineldín and other Carapintadas made a second attempt at overthrowing the government, now led by President Carlos Menem. The coup failed, and Seineldín was sentenced to life imprisonment, which he served until his 2003 pardon.
- 1990 Chadian coup d'état: The Patriotic Salvation Movement (MPS), a Libyan–backed rebel group under the leadership of General Idriss Déby, entered the capital N'Djamena unopposed. After three months of provisional government, the MPS approved a national charter in 1991, with Déby as president.
- 1990 Panamanian coup attempt: Colonel Eduardo Herrera Hassan, a former officer in the Panama Defense Forces, led a police rebellion against Guillermo Endara. Herrera's coup attempt was suppressed with U.S. support.
- 1990 Surinamese coup d'état (also known as the Telephone Coup): Acting commander-in-chief of the Suriname National Army (SNL), Police Chief Ivan Graanoogst, dismissed President Ramsewak Shankar by telephone on 24 December. On 27 December, the government was dismissed, the National Assembly was dissolved, and Johan Kraag was appointed as president on 29 December. On 31 December, Dési Bouterse was reappointed as commander-in-chief of the SNL.
- 1990 Venda coup d'état
- 1990 Ciskei coup d'état

=== 1991 ===
- 1991 Soviet coup attempt (also known as the August Coup): Communist leaders failed to take control of the country from Mikhail Gorbachev, who was Soviet President and General Secretary of the party.
- 1991 Haitian coup d'état: The Armed Forces of Haiti deposed President Jean-Bertrand Aristide. Superior Court justice Joseph Nérette was installed as provisional president.
- 1991 Thai coup d'état: The National Peace Keeping Council, a military junta, overthrew the elected civilian government of Chatichai Choonhavan in 1991.
- 1991–92 Georgian coup d'état (also known as the Tbilisi War or the Putsch of 1991–92): A military coup removed President Zviad Gamsakhurdia from office.
- 1991 Malian coup d'état: A military coup overthrew Moussa Traoré, who had been dictator for over two decades.
- 1991 Lesotho coup d'état: Elias Phisoana Ramaema overthrows Justin Lekhanya and restores Moshoeshoe II as king.
- Somalia: Guerrilla forces, including the Somali Salvation Democratic Front in the northeast, the Somali National Movement in the northwest, and the United Somali Congress in the south, performed a successful coup against the Siad Barre government. Mohamed Farrah Aidid, the general most responsible for the coup, declared himself president.

=== 1992 ===
- 1992 Algerian coup d'état: A military coup canceled elections and forced President Chadli Bendjedid to resign.
- 1992 Peruvian coup d'état: In a self-coup, President Alberto Fujimori dissolved the Peruvian congress and judiciary and assumed full legislative and judicial powers.
- 1992 Peruvian coup attempt: General Jaime Salinas Sedó led a group of military officers in attempting to overthrow President Fujimori, but was unsuccessful.
- 1992 Venezuelan coup d'état attempts: There were two unsuccessful coup attempts against Carlos Andrés Pérez, in February and November; the first led by Hugo Chávez.
- 1992 Sierra Leonean coup d'état: A group of young military officers, led by Captain Valentine Strasser, took control of the government. They deposed President Joseph Saidu Momoh and Strasser took control of the government.
- 1992 Sudanese coup attempt was led by Colonel Ahmed Khaled who was a sympathiser of the Sudanese Ba'ath Party.
- Rahmon Nabiyev was forced to resign from the government militia on 7 September, with Emomali Rahmon assuming internal power in November.

=== 1993 ===
- 1993 Guatemalan constitutional crisis: President Jorge Serrano Elías launched a self-coup, illegally suspending the constitution and dissolving Congress and the Supreme Court. Facing protests and international pressure, Serrano resigned the presidency and fled the country. He was briefly replaced by Vice President Gustavo Adolfo Espina Salguero, but after Espina was found by the Supreme Court to have been involved in the coup, Congress replaced him with Ramiro de León Carpio.
- 1993 Russian constitutional crisis (also known as the 1993 October Coup, Black October, the Shooting of the White House or Ukase 1400): President Boris Yeltsin launched a self-coup, illegally dissolving the Russian parliament.
- 1993 Azerbaijani coup d'état: Militia led by military commander Surat Huseynov overthrew President Abulfaz Elchibey and brought Heydar Aliyev to power.
- 1993 Burundian coup attempt: Officers of the Tutsi-dominated army launched a coup attempt against Hutu President Melchior Ndadaye. The attempt, although initially successful and even resulting in Ndadaye's death, collapsed in the wake of widespread ethnic violence across the country.
- 1993 Libyan coup attempt
- 1993 Nigerian coup d'état

=== 1994 ===
- 1994 Bophuthatswana crisis: Lucas Mangope was overthrown by the South African Defence Force (SADF).
- 1994 Gambian coup d'état: A group of soldiers led by Lieutenant Yahya Jammeh seized power in a bloodless coup, ousting Dawda Jawara, who had been President of the Gambia since its independence in 1965.
- 1994 Lesotho coup d'état
- 1994 Liberian coup attempt

=== 1995 ===
- 1995 Azerbaijani coup attempt (also known as the Turkish coup in Baku): members of the Azerbaijani military, led by Colonel Rovshan Javadov, aimed to take control from president Heydar Aliyev and reinstall former president Abulfaz Elchibey. The coup was foiled when the Turkish President Süleyman Demirel became aware of elements in Turkey supporting the plot, and called Aliyev to warn him. On 17 March, units of the Azerbaijani Armed Forces surrounded the insurgents' camp and assaulted it, killing Colonel Javadov.
- 1995 Qatari coup d'état: Crown Prince Hamad bin Khalifa Al Thani who, with the support of the ruling Al Thani family, took control of the country while his father, Emir Khalifa bin Hamad Al Thani, was away.
- 1995 Pakistani coup attempt: A failed coup plot to overthrow Benazir Bhutto.
- 1995 São Tomé and Príncipe coup attempt

=== 1996 ===
- 1996 Qatari coup attempt: Many members of the Al Thani family who were still allies of Khalifa bin Hamad Al Thani, who had been deposed in a coup the prior year, organized a coup to overthrow Hamad bin Khalifa Al Thani. However, the coup was discovered and thwarted.
- 1996 Burundian coup d'état: In the midst of the Burundi Civil War, former president Pierre Buyoya deposed President Sylvestre Ntibantunganya.
- 1996 Iraqi coup attempt: A coup attempt against President Saddam Hussein failed.
- 1996 Nigerien coup d'etat: Ibrahim Baré Maïnassara overthrows Mahamane Ousmane.
- 1996 Guinean coup attempt
- 1996 Paraguayan coup attempt
- 1996 Bangladeshi coup attempt

=== 1997 ===
- 1997 Turkish military memorandum (also known as the Post-modern coup): Military decisions issued in a National Security Council meeting have been described as a coup. Although the parliament was not dissolved, the military pressure resulted in the resignation of Prime Minister Necmettin Erbakan.
- First Congo War: Mobutu Sese Seko was overthrown by the rebel leader Laurent Kabila and the collapse of Zaire which marked the end of the Mobutu regime after 32 years of dictatorship, renaming the country as the Democratic Republic of the Congo.
- 1997 Cambodian coup d'état: Co-premier Hun Sen ousted the other co-premier, Norodom Ranariddh.
- On 16 October 1997 Cobra militia supported by tanks and a force of 1,000 Angolan troops cemented their control of Brazzaville, Republic of the Congo, having ousted Pascal Lissouba. Denis Sassou Nguesso assumed power on the following day, declaring himself president.
- 1997 Zambian coup attempt: Captain Steven Lungu rebelled against the Zambian president Frederick Chiluba, but failed to enact a coup.

=== 1998 ===
- May 1998 riots of Indonesia: Mass violence, demonstrations, and civil unrest, triggered by economic problems including food shortages and mass unemployment, eventually led to the resignation of President Suharto and the fall of the New Order.
- 1998 Guinea-Bissau coup attempt
- 1998 Albanian coup attempt

=== 1999 ===
- 1999 Tashkent bombings: In addition to terrorist attacks in different parts of the Uzbek capital, there was an attempt to assassinate Islam Karimov and an explosion at the Cabinet of Ministers building before the government meeting. Some, including in the government, called it an attempted coup by Islamist forces.
- 1999 Nigerien coup d'état: Ibrahim Baré Maïnassara was assassinated by Daouda Malam Wanké during the coup.
- 1999 Comorian coup d'état: Colonel Azali Assoumani led a military coup that ousted Interim president Tadjidine Ben Said Massounde.
- 1999 Pakistani coup d'état: In a bloodless coup, military staff under Chairman of the Joint Chiefs of Staff Committee General Pervez Musharraf seized control of the civilian government of Prime Minister Nawaz Sharif on 12 October. Musharraf declared a state of emergency and imposed martial law. Sharif was arrested and later exiled.
- 1999 Ivorian coup d'état: A group of soldiers led by Tuo Fozié rebelled on 23 December, overthrowing President Henri Konan Bédié.
- 1999: miners from Valea Jiului, led by Miron Cozma and supported by Corneliu Vadim Tudor's Greater Romania Party, unsuccessfully attempted to overthrow the CDR-led government

== 2000–2009 ==
=== 2000 ===
- 2000 Ecuadorian coup d'état: President Jamil Mahuad was deposed and replaced by Vice President Gustavo Noboa.
- 2000 Fijian coup d'état: A civilian coup by hardline i-Taukei nationalists against the elected government of Prime Minister Mahendra Chaudhry occurred on 19 May. President Kamisese Mara attempted to assert executive authority on 27 May, but gave his resignation, possibly forced, on 29 May. An interim government headed by Commodore Frank Bainimarama was set up, and handed power over to an interim administration headed by Josefa Iloilo, as president, on 13 July.
- 2000 Solomon Islands coup d'état: Rebel Malaita Eagle Forces led a coup against Prime Minister Bartholomew Ulufa'alu. Ulufa'alua was forced to resign, and was replaced by Manasseh Sogavare.
- 2000 Paraguayan coup attempt
- 2000 Cambodian coup d'état attempt

=== 2001 ===
- 2001 Ivorian coup attempt
- 2001 Burundian coup attempt: A group of junior army officers attempted a coup against President Pierre Buyoya, who was out of the country. The conspirators briefly occupied a state-run radio station before being removed by forces loyal to the president.
- 2001 Central African Republic coup attempt: Commandos of the Central African Armed Forces attempted to overthrow President Ange-Félix Patassé. The coup failed, though violence continued in the capital for several days after.
- 2001 Haitian coup attempt

=== 2002 ===
- 2002 Central African Republic coup attempt: Bozize loyalists militia attacked Bangui on 25 October 2002 to remove Ange-Félix Patassé from power. The battle lasted for six days and the government forces, with the support from Libya and Movement for the Liberation of the Congo, managed to thwart the coup attempt.
- 2002 Ivorian coup attempt: A coup may have been attempted on 19 September, the first night of the First Ivorian Civil War. Former president Robert Guéï was killed; the government claimed it had happened as he attempted to lead a coup, but it was widely claimed that Guéï and 15 others had been murdered in his home and his body moved.
- 2002 Venezuelan coup attempt: President Hugo Chávez was ousted from office for 47 hours before being restored to power with the help of popular support (mostly labor unions) and members of the military.
- A failed plot led by white supremacists linked to Boeremag to overthrow the African National Congress government of South Africa. The conspiracy included an assassination attempt on former president Nelson Mandela and bomb attacks.

=== 2003 ===
- 2003 Central African Republic coup d'état: President Ange-Félix Patassé was overthrown while out of the country, when the forces of General François Bozizé took over.
- 2003 Mauritanian coup attempt: Former Major Saleh Ould Hanenna led a rebel section of the Army to attempt a coup against President Maaouya Ould Sid'Ahmed Taya. The soldiers were defeated by troops loyal to the President.
- 2003 São Tomé and Príncipe coup attempt: Major Fernando Pereira launched a coup against the government of President Fradique de Menezes. After a week with the Army in power, conspirators relinquished control following negotiations with the government.
- Oakwood mutiny in the Philippines: A group of military defectors who came to be known as the Magdalo forcibly occupied the Oakwood Premier apartments and demanded the resignation of President Gloria Macapagal Arroyo and other officials. They relinquished the apartments about 20 hours later after negotiations.
- 2003 Guinea-Bissau coup d'état: General Veríssimo Correia Seabra led a bloodless military coup against President Kumba Ialá.
- 2003 Burkina Faso coup attempt: A plot to overthrow President Blaise Compaoré was discovered and thwarted.
- Sledgehammer (coup plan) an alleged Turkish secularist military coup plan dating back to 2003, in response to the Justice and Development Party (AKP) gaining office.

=== 2004 ===
- 2004 Haitian coup d'état: President Jean-Bertrand Aristide was ousted during his second term, and an interim government led by Prime Minister Gérard Latortue and President Boniface Alexandre was installed.
- 2004 Chadian coup attempt: A coup attempt against President Idriss Déby was suppressed after a brief exchange of fire.
- 2004 Democratic Republic of the Congo coup attempt: A plot to overthrow Joseph Kabila orchestrated by Eric Lenge was foiled.
- 2004 Equatorial Guinea coup attempt (also known as the Wonga Coup): A plot was developed to replace President Teodoro Obiang Nguema Mbasogo with exiled opposition politician, Severo Moto Nsá. However, the mercenaries who had been hired by mostly British financiers were arrested in Zimbabwe before they could carry out the plot.
- Sarıkız, Ayışığı, Yakamoz and Eldiven were the names of alleged Turkish military coup plans in 2004.
- 2004 Sudanese coup attempt was a coup d'état attempt in March 2004 against president Omar al-Bashir and his cabinet, orchestrated by opposition leaders and Hassan Al-Turabi.

=== 2005 ===
- Peru coup attempt next to civil uprising known as the Andahuaylas uprising, directed by Antauro Humala in the city of Andahuaylas
- Ecuador civil coup d'état of 2005. It resulted in the premature end of President Lucio Edwin Gutiérrez Borbúa's term
- 2005 Togolese coup d'état legalized by parliamentary vote but unrecognized by international community.
- The Andijan massacre was referred to by Uzbek officials as an attempted coup.
- 2005 Nepal coup d'état: King Gyanendra of Nepal overthrows the government in a self-coup, making him the head of government. The government is reestablished 24 April 2006 after a massive democracy movement.
- 2005 Mauritanian coup d'état: A military coup in Mauritania overthrows President Maaouya Ould Sid'Ahmed Taya. A group of officers headed by Colonel Ely Ould Mohamed Vall form the Military Council for Justice and Democracy (CMJD) to act as the interim government.

=== 2006 ===
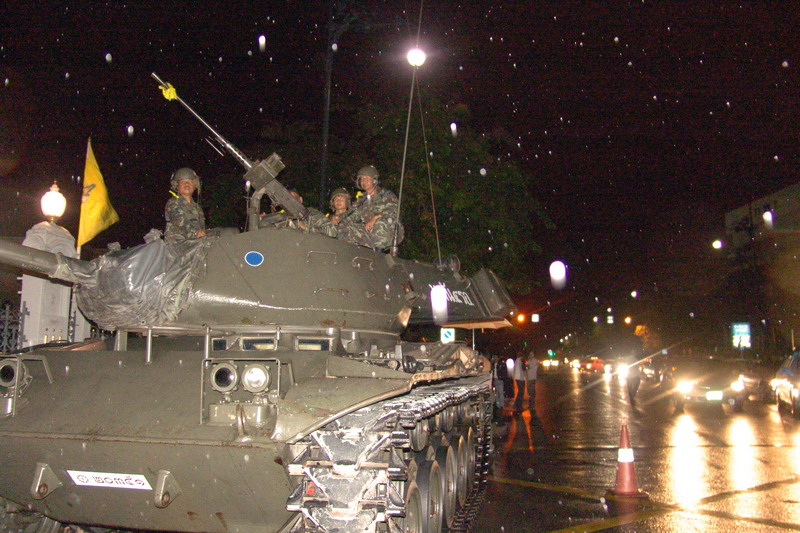
Tanks in Bangkok's street in 2006

- Oplan HACKLE: The Armed Forces of the Philippines allegedly attempted a military coup targeting President Gloria Macapagal Arroyo, which led to a state of emergency in the country.
- 2006 Chadian coup attempt: The United Front for Democratic Change allegedly attempts to instigate a military coup to overthrow President Idriss Déby.
- 2006 Thai coup d'état: The Royal Thai Army orchestrates a coup that overthrows Prime Minister Thaksin Shinawatra while he is out of the country.
- 2006 Malagasy coup d'état attempt: The Malagasy Popular Armed Forces allegedly attempt a coup against President Marc Ravalomanana.
- 2006 Fijian coup d'état: The Republic of Fiji Military Forces overthrow President Josefa Iloilo and Prime Minister Laisenia Qarase in a bloodless coup.
- The military of Côte d'Ivoire claims to foil a coup attempt targeting President Laurent Gbagbo.
- 2006 Malagasy coup attempt: A coup attempt led by General Andrianafidisoa against President Marc Ravalomanana

=== 2007 ===
- 2007 Laotian coup d'état conspiracy allegation: An alleged coup attempt by General Vang Pao and others in the United States to overthrow the government is foiled.
- 2007 Zimbabwean alleged coup attempt: An alleged coup attempt led by retired officers to overthrow the government is foiled.
- Manila Peninsula rebellion in the Philippines: Rebel forces led by opposition politician Senator Antonio Trillanes from the Magdalo Group, storm the Peninsula hotel in an attempted coup.

=== 2008 ===
- East Timorese President José Ramos-Horta is shot and injured in what Prime Minister Xanana Gusmão describes as an attempted coup.
- 2008 Mauritanian coup d'état: A military coup took place involving the seizure and the capture of President Sidi Ould Cheikh Abdallahi, Prime Minister Yahya Ould Ahmed El Waghef, and the Interior Minister after the sacking of several military officials. The coup was led by general Mohamed Ould Abdel Aziz and general Mohamed Ould Ghazouani.
- 2008 Guinean coup d'état: A military coup after the death of President Lansana Conté.
- 2008 Sudanese coup attempt: An attack by Justice and Equality Movement (JEM) rebels on Omar al-Bashir's government around the capital Khartoum.

=== 2009 ===
- 2009 Malagasy political crisis: The army seized one of the presidential palaces on 16 March 2009, at which president Marc Ravalomanana was not present. The proposal offered by the president for a referendum to solve the crisis was rejected. On 17 March, Ravalomanana resigned under pressure from the military.
- 2009 Georgian mutiny: An alleged abortive mutiny by a Georgian Army tank battalion based in Mukhrovani village with a goal of removing President Mikheil Saakashvili from power.
- 2009 Honduran coup d'état: The army seized one of the presidential palaces, kidnapped president Manuel Zelaya Rosales due to his endeavor for an unconstitutional reelection and extradited him from the country.
- On 24 April 2009, the Ethiopian government claimed, through the Ethiopian News Agency, that it had foiled a coup attempt led by members of Ginbot 7 to overthrow the government. Ginbot 7 described the allegation that it had attempted a coup as a "baseless accusation" that fitted a pattern of distraction and scapegoating by the government.

== 2010–2019 ==
=== 2010 ===
- 2010 Nigerien coup d'état by Salou Djibo against President Mamadou Tandja.
- 2010 Guinea-Bissau military unrest
- 2010 Ecuadorian crisis
- 2010 Madagascar coup attempt

=== 2011 ===
- Tunisian revolution: A series of street demonstrations that led to the ousting of longtime dictator Zine El Abidine Ben Ali.
- 2011 Egyptian coup d'état: Following mass protests and an army's communiqué, Hosni Mubarak resigned. According to the Egyptian Constitution of 1971, speaker of the People's Assembly Ahmad Fathi Sorour should have succeeded him, but Muhammad Hussein Tantawy took power instead.
- United Arab Emirates: Amid the Arab Spring, forces loyal to President Khalifa bin Zayed Al Nahyan foiled a coup plot led by Prince Hamdan Al Nahyan, which allegedly sought to transition the UAE from an autocratic system to a constitutional monarchy.
- 2011 Bahraini uprising
- 2011 Democratic Republic of the Congo coup attempt
- 2011 Bangladesh coup attempt
- 2011 Nigerien coup attempt: A group of Dissenting factions of the armed forces launched failed attempt to overthrow Mahamadou Issoufou from the presidency.
- Coup d'état in Libya in 2011: On September 20, Gaddafi government was overthrown following the fall of Tripoli to anti-Gaddafi forces during the Libyan civil war (2011).
- 2011 Guinea-Bissau coup attempt

=== 2012 ===
- 2012 Papua New Guinea Defence Force mutiny
- 2012 Malian coup d'état led by Captain Amadou Sanogo against President Amadou Toumani Touré.
- 2012 Malawian constitutional crisis
- 2012 Guinea-Bissau coup d'état by Army Vice Chief of Staff General Mamadu Ture Kuruma against Acting President Raimundo Pereira and ex-Prime Minister and presidential candidate Carlos Gomes Júnior.
- 2012 Malian counter-coup attempt by Amadou Toumani Touré's loyalists against Acting President Dioncounda Traoré and acting prime minister Cheick Modibo Diarra.
- 2012 Ivorian coup attempt: Pro-Laurent Gbagbo military officers failed to oust Alassane Ouattara.
- 2012 Syrian coup attempt: Syrian opposition fails to overthrow President Bashar al-Assad.
- 2012 Sudanese coup attempt: An attempt president Omar al-Bashir, resulting in 13 arrests.

=== 2013 ===
- The Eritrean opposition claimed that there was an attempted coup on 21 January 2013.
- 2013 Beninese coup d'état attempt led by Col. Pamphile Zomahoun against President Boni Yayi.
- The UAE Government tried 94 people linked to Al Islah for an alleged coup plot.
- On 24 March 2013 Séléka rebels overthrew the government of the Central African Republic.
- 2013 Syrian coup attempt: Rebels failed to overthrow President Bashar al-Assad.
- 17 April 2013: An attempted coup in Libya against Prime Minister Ali Zeidan by Muammar Gaddafi loyalists.
- 2013 Comorian coup attempt against President Ikililou Dhoinine.
- 2013 Chadian coup attempt on 1 May 2013 against President Idriss Déby.
- 2013 Egyptian coup d'état led by General Abdul Fatah al-Sisi ousted president Mohamed Morsi.
- 2013 Libyan coup attempt led by Abdel Moneim Aboul Fotouh against Prime Minister Ali Zeidan.
- 2013 DR Congo coup d'état attempt

=== 2014 ===
- Two attempted coups in Libya, one on February and another in May by the Libyan Republican Alliance led by Maj. Gen. Khalifa Haftar against Prime Minister Ali Zeidan in the first coup and Prime Minister Abdullah al-Thani in the second.
- Abkhazian Revolution
- An attempted coup in Lesotho against Prime Minister Tom Thabane by Lieutenant General Kennedy Tlai Kamoli and Deputy Prime Minister Mothetjoa Metsing.
- 2014 Thai coup d'état: The Royal Thai Armed Forces led by General Prayut Chan-o-cha overthrew the Yingluck cabinet, establishing a military junta on 22 May 2014.
- 2014 Burkina Faso uprising: Lt. Colonel Yacouba Isaac Zida overthrew president Blaise Compaoré and briefly served as head of state before selecting Michel Kafando as the new president. Days later, Kafando appointed Zida as acting prime minister.
- 2014 Gambian coup attempt was launched against President Yahya Jammeh by former head of the presidential guards Lamin Sanneh.
- Houthi takeover in Yemen (also known as the September 21 Revolution or the 2014–15 Yemeni coup d'état): During the Yemeni civil war, the Houthis launched a coup against President Abdrabbuh Mansur Hadi. The Houthis seized control of Sanaa, while Hadi relocated the capital to Aden.

=== 2015 ===
- 2015 Burundian coup attempt by General Godefroid Niyombare against President Pierre Nkurunziza.
- 2015 Burkina Faso coup attempt against President Michel Kafando by General Gilbert Diendéré.
- 26 September – 3 October 2015: Failed attempt by Haroun Gaye and Eugene Ngaïkosset to overthrow president of the Central African Republic Catherine Samba-Panza.
- 2015 Tajikistan coup d'état attempt.
- Angolan coup attempt.

=== 2016 ===
- 2016 Turkish coup attempt: An attempted coup failed against President Recep Tayyip Erdoğan.
- Filipino coup plot in 2016
- 2016 Burkina Faso coup attempt: Blaise Compaore loyalists and former presidential guards failed to overthrow President Roch Marc Christian Kaboré.
- 2016 Libyan coup d'état attempt: An attempted coup against prime minister-designate Fayez al-Sarraj led by Khalifa al-Ghawil.
- Montenegrin coup plot: Attempted coup by Main Intelligence Directorate agents and pro-Russian organisations from Serbia and Montenegro against the government of Milo Đukanović on the day of the parliamentary election.

=== 2017 ===
- 2016–2017 Gambian constitutional crisis
- A coup d'état plot was foiled in Austria in April. The leader Monika Unger and others were arrested after they tried to organise an army-led coup.
- On 21 June 2017, Prince Mohammed bin Salman ousted and succeeded Saudi Crown Prince and de facto leader Muhammad bin Nayef in what was described as a "palace coup".
- 2017 Luhansk coup
- 2017 Zimbabwean coup d'état: In the early hours of 15 November, an army spokesman announced the military takeover of government. This was after the army had seized control of the state run television broadcasting station. During the night before they had stormed president Robert Mugabe's private residence and him under house arrest. The military police also captured and detained some cabinet ministers whom they labelled criminals around Mugabe. It succeeded with Mugabe's resignation on 21 November.
- 2017 Equatorial Guinea coup attempt.

=== 2018 ===
- 2018 Yemeni coup d'état

=== 2019 ===
- 2019 Gabonese coup attempt: On 7 January, members of the Armed Forces of Gabon announced a coup, claiming to have ousted President Ali Bongo Ondimba. The government later declared that it had reasserted control.
- 2019 Islamic State Coup d'état attempt: On February 8, an Islamic State faction attempted to kill Abu Bakr al-Baghdadi.
- 2019 Sudanese coup d'état: On 11 April 201the Sudanese Armed Forces overthrew Sudanese President Omar al-Bashir after popular protests.
- On April 2, president Abdelaziz Bouteflika resigned under pressure from the military, following the 2019–2021 Algerian protests.
- 2019 Venezuelan uprising attempt
- 2019 Bolivian political crisis
- Amhara Region coup attempt: Factions of the security forces of Amhara Region, Ethiopia, attempted a coup against the regional government after a series of assassinations.
- On September 20, three people were arrested for taking part in a coup plot in Ghana.

== 2020–present ==
=== 2020 ===
- On 7 March, the Saudi Arabian government arrested Princes Ahmed bin Abdulaziz, Muhammad bin Nayef, Nayef bin Ahmed, Nawwaf bin Nayef and Muhammad bin Saad for allegedly planning a coup attempt.
- Operation Gideon (2020): Attempt by Venezuelan dissidents with aid from American mercenaries to overthrow Nicolás Maduro.
- 2020 Malian coup d'état: Mutinying soldiers within the Malian Army attacked the capital and the nearby army base. The soldiers arrested both the democratically elected President Ibrahim Boubacar Keïta and Prime Minister Boubou Cissé after months of anti-government protests. Keïta resigned and dissolved both the government and parliament. A military junta was soon after installed under Colonel Assimi Goita.
- The Federal Bureau of Investigation announced the arrests of 13 men suspected of orchestrating a domestic terror plot to kidnap American politician Gretchen Whitmer, the Governor of Michigan, and otherwise using violence to overthrow the state government.
- On 20 October, a senior army officer in Sudan announced that some retired members of the Popular Defence Forces and officers under leader Brigadier General Mohammed Ibrahim Abdul-Jalil had foiled a coup plot. The government has not confirmed this claim.

=== 2020–2021 ===
- 2020–21 Central African Republic coup attempt: In December 2020 major rebel groups in Central African Republic led by former president François Bozizé formed the Coalition of Patriots for Change trying to overthrow the government. Rebel groups attacked Bangui on 13 January but were repulsed by government forces.
- January 6 United States Capitol attack and other attempts to overturn the 2020 United States presidential election: Joe Biden was elected as president in November 2020, defeating the incumbent, Donald Trump. Trump and numerous other Republicans repeatedly made false claims that widespread electoral fraud had occurred and that only he had legitimately won the election. (Note: Attributed to multiple references:) Although most resulting lawsuits were either dismissed or ruled against by numerous courts, (Note: Attributed to multiple references:) Trump nonetheless conspired with his campaign team to submit documents in several states (all of which Biden had won) that falsely claimed to be legitimate electoral votes for President Trump and Vice President Mike Pence. (Note: Attributed to multiple references:) After the submission of these documents, the Trump campaign intended that the presiding officer of the United States Senate, either President of the Senate Pence or President pro tempore Chuck Grassley, would claim the unilateral power to reject electors during the January 6, 2021 vote counting session; the presiding officer would reject all electors from the several states for which the Trump campaign had submitted false documents, leaving 232 votes for Trump and 222 votes for Biden, thereby overturning the election results in Trump's favor. (Note: Attributed to multiple references:) This plan failed after Pence refused to cooperate with it. (Note: Attributed to multiple references:) Trump nevertheless urged his supporters on January 6 to march to the Capitol while the joint session of Congress was assembled there to count electoral votes and formalize Biden's victory, whereupon hundreds of people stormed the building and interrupted the count. After the Capitol was cleared, Congress officially counted the election results, with Pence, in his role as president of the Senate, announcing Biden and Harris as the winners. On January 7, Trump acknowledged the incoming administration without mentioning Biden's name. Biden was inaugurated as the 46th president of the United States on January 20, 2021. On January 20, 2025, the first day of his second presidency, Trump granted blanket clemency to all Capitol attack defendants.
- 2021 Myanmar coup d'état: On 1 February, State Counsellor Aung San Suu Kyi and President Win Myint were arrested by the military, which announced that power had been handed to Min Aung Hlaing, the commander-in-chief of the armed forces. The military announced on state TV that they would be in control of the country for one year.
- 2021 Armenian coup attempt: On 25 February, Armenian Armed Forces chief of staff Onik Gasparyan called on Prime Minister Nikol Pashinyan to resign due to his handling of the 2020 Nagorno-Karabakh war and after the dismissal of the first deputy-head of army.
- 2021 Nigerien coup attempt: On 31 March, elements within the military attempted a coup. After gunfire at the presidential palace, the Presidential Guard fended off the attack and many of its alleged perpetrators were later detained.
- 2021 arrests in Jordan: On 3 April, authorities arrested top officials and members of the royal family, including former Crown Prince Hamzah bin Hussein, for involvement in an attempted coup.
- 2021 Northern Chad offensive
- 2021 Malian coup d'état: On 24 May, the president, prime minister, and defense minister were detained by the military.
- Coup attempt in Tajikistan in 2021.
- 2021 Tunisian self-coup: Kais Saied launches a self-coup and overthrows the Assembly of the Representatives of the People.
- 2021 Afghan coup d'état: On 15 August, the Taliban captured the capital Kabul, and overthrew the Islamic Republic of Afghanistan under President Ashraf Ghani.
- 2021 Guinean coup d'état: On 5 September, military forces led by Mamady Doumbouya, invaded the presidential palace and arrested president Alpha Conde.
- September 2021 Sudanese coup attempt: On 21 September, officials and troops loyal to ousted leader Omar al-Bashir attempted a coup against the Sovereignty Council of Sudan.
- October–November 2021 Sudanese coup d'état: On 25 October, the military launched a successful coup against the government. Prime minister Abdalla Hamdok was arrested, the government was dissolved and a state of emergency was declared by Abdel Fattah al-Burhan. Hamdok was later reinstated in November but resigned in 2022 amid continuing protests.
- French security agencies shut down an alleged coup plan led by Rémy Daillet-Wiedemann.
- 2021 Ukrainian coup attempt allegations: In November 2021, top government officials outlined allegations of a plot to overthrow the government which was to take place in early December. The coup plot was allegedly orchestrated by Russia. Some months later, Russia launched an invasion of Ukraine, with the toppling of the Ukrainian government being one of its objectives.

=== 2022 ===
- 2022 Kazakh unrest
- January 2022 Burkina Faso coup d'état: In late January, the military staged a coup against Roch Marc Christian Kaboré.
- 2022 Guinea-Bissau coup attempt: A coup d'état was attempted on 1 February. President Umaro Sissoco Embalo said that "many" members of the security forces had been killed in a "failed attack against democracy".
- 2022 Democratic Republic of the Congo coup d'état allegations
- 2022 Ukrainian coup d'état attempt: The Russian Federal Security Service and recruited ATO veterans were set to take control of various Ukrainian cities, install pro-Russian leaders in them and transfer those cities to the Russian army during the Russian invasion of Ukraine. However, as plans for coup were discovered by Ukrainian authorities, people who were set to participate in it were detained by the SBU.
- 2022 Malian coup d'état attempt.
- September 2022 Burkina Faso coup d'état: Removed Interim President Paul-Henri Sandaogo Damiba over his alleged inability to deal with the country's Islamist insurgency. Damiba had come to power in a coup d'état eight months earlier. Captain Ibrahim Traoré took over as interim leader.
- 2022 Brazilian coup plot
- 2022 São Tomé and Príncipe coup attempt: An attempted coup was reported to have taken place overnight on 24–25 November.
- 2022 German coup d'état plot: On 7 December, 25 members of a suspected far-right terrorist group were arrested for allegedly planning a coup. The group, called Patriotic Union (German: Patriotische Union), which was led by a Council (German: Rat), was a part of the German far-right extremist Reichsbürger movement. The group aimed to re-establish a monarchist government in Germany in the tradition of the German Reich, with the government being similar to the German Empire. The group allegedly wanted to provoke chaos and a civil war so that it could take power.
- 2022 Peruvian self-coup attempt: On 7 December, the left-wing President Pedro Castillo attempted to dissolve Congress in the face of imminent impeachment proceedings by the legislative body, which would have been the third impeachment attempt against him in less than two years. Due to broadly interpreted wording in the Constitution of Peru, Congress can impeach the president for "moral incapacity", among other causes, while the president can legally dissolve congress only if two cabinets have been denied a vote of confidence.
- Coup attempt in Kazakhstan in 2022.
- 2022 Gambian coup attempt

=== 2023 ===
- 8 January Brasília attacks: Supporters of former president Jair Bolsonaro storm the National Congress of Brazil, Supreme Federal Court and Palácio do Planalto in Brasília, in an effort to overturn the result of the 2022 Brazilian general election and claim for a military coup against President Luiz Inácio Lula da Silva.
- 2023 Moldovan coup attempt allegations: Plans were unveiled by president Maia Sandu that showed Russian efforts to overthrow the Government of Moldova.
- Attempted coup in Sudan in 2023: Clashes broke out between the paramilitary Rapid Support Forces, and the Sudanese Armed Forces. The fighting began with attacks by the Rapid Support Forces on key government sites, and both forces dispute control between the Presidential Palace, Khartoum International Airport, the Army chief's official residence, and several different military bases located around the country.
- On 6 May, 30 people were arrested in Kyrgyzstan for an attempted coup.
- 2023 Azerbaijan coup plot.
- Wagner Group rebellion
- 2023 Nigerien coup d'état: On 26 July, President Mohamed Bazoum was overthrown in a coup plot led by Niger Air Force Colonel-Major Amadou Abdramane. The reasoning for the coup announced by Abdramane was dissatisfaction was "due to the deteriorating security situation and bad governance." The coup would lead to the 2023 Nigerien crisis.
- 2023 Sierra Leone coup plot: Police arrested 19 people, including fourteen serving personnel of the Republic of Sierra Leone Armed Forces, two officers of the Sierra Leone Police and one retired chief superintendent of police who were allegedly planning a coup between August 7 and 10. In addition, five military officers and three police officers have a search and capture warrant.
- 2023 Gabonese coup d'état: Following the 2023 Gabonese general election, and president Ali Bongo Ondimba's declaration of victory, soldiers from the presidential guard announced the cancellation of the election and the "dissolution of the regime".
- 2023 Burkina Faso coup attempt: An attempted overthrow of the ruling junta by members of the military failed.
- 2023 Guinea-Bissau coup attempt: An attempt by the National Guard to overthrow Umaro Sissoco Embaló.
- 2023 Sierra Leone coup attempt: An attempt by an unknown group to overthrow Julius Maada Bio fails.

=== 2024 ===
- A coup attempt took place in Burkina Faso on January 14.
- Oyo State coup attempt in Nigeria
- 2024 Democratic Republic of the Congo coup attempt: The military arrested perpetrators after a failed coup attempt in Gombe, Kinshasa on May 19.
- 2024 Bolivian coup attempt: On 26 June, general Juan José Zúñiga led a failed coup attempt in the capital La Paz, at one point entering the Palacio Quemado, the former presidential palace.
- 2024 Ukrainian coup attempt allegations
- Kyrgyz security services arrested five on charges of organising a coup attempt on July 5.
- July Uprising: On 5 August, Prime Minister Sheikh Hasina was overthrown by the military of Bangladesh.
- 2024 Bangladeshi judicial coup allegations: Following the resignation of Prime Minister Sheikh Hasina in the aftermath of the July revolution, Certain Supreme Court judges were alleged to have called a full court to invalidate the newly formed Interim government of Muhammad Yunus.
- 2024 Serbian coup attempt allegations
- On September 26, 2024, 3 people arrested on charges of organising a coup in Benin.
- Thirty people are arrested while seven are accused of organizing a coup in Kyrgyzstan on November 19.
- 2024 Armenian coup attempt allegations
- 2024 Tigray coup d'état in Ethiopia: Interim Regional Administration of Tigray president Getachew Reda was overthrown by the Tigray People's Liberation Front.
- German police arrested 8 people for planning a coup to take over Saxony.
- 2024 South Korean martial law crisis: President Yoon Suk Yeol attempted a self-coup by declaring martial law. It ultimately failed when 190 MPs were able to bypass a military blockade and voted to overturn the martial law declaration. The attempt resulted in Yoon's impeachment, removal, arrest and eventual life imprisonment.
- 2024–2025 Romanian election annulment protests: Invalidation by the Constitutional Court due to alleged "Russian interference" and disqualification of the Winning Candidate for the Re-run of the Election, has been called a "Judicial coup" by many in the country.
- Fall of the Assad regime: On 8 December 2024, the Assad regime collapsed during a major offensive by opposition forces.

=== 2025 ===
- 2025 Azerbaijani coup plot
- 2025 N'Djamena attack in Chad: An armed commando unit attacked the presidential palace in the capital N'Djamena, killing at least 18 of its 24 members on January 9.
- 2025 Georgia coup allegations
- 2025 Slovakia coup allegations
- The actions of the Department of Government Efficiency, in the United States, led by Elon Musk, have been described as a "takeover", "freeze", or "coup" by members of the Democratic Party and media. (Note: Attributed to multiple references:)
- 2025 Romanian coup d'état attempt allegations
- 2025 Kyrgyz coup attempt
- 2025 Burkina Faso coup attempt
- Six neo-Nazis belonging to the Lusitanian Armillary Movement were arrested after planning an attack on the Assembly of the Republic of Portugal on June 17.
- 2025 Armenian coup attempt allegations
- 2025 Colombian coup attempt
- 2025 Malian coup attempt
- 2025 Nigeria coup attempt
- 2025 Georgian uprising attempt
- 2025 Malagasy coup d'état: CAPSAT, a unit of the Madagascar Armed Forces, joined anti-government protesters before announcing control of the entire military, resulting in Andry Rajoelina fleeing the country and being overthrown.
- 2025 Guinea-Bissau coup d'état: On 26 November, a coup d'état was carried out by the army chief of staff and military officers, arresting president Umaro Sissoco Embaló. The military declared "total control" over the country and established the High Military Command for the Restoration of Order. The coup occurred days after the 2025 Guinea-Bissau general election held on 23 November, in which Embaló was running for reelection.
- 2025 Beninese coup attempt

=== 2026 ===
- 2026 Burkina Faso coup attempt
- 2026 Mali offensives
- 2026 Nigerien coup attempt
- 2026 Polish coup d'état allegations: On 30–31 October Prime Minister Donald Tusk ordered the removal of judges from the Constitutional Tribunal appointed by the previously ruling Law and Justice party, which sparked a major constitutional crisis.

== See also ==
- Coup d'état
- List of coups and coup attempts by country
- List of coups and coup attempts since 2010
- List of invasions
- List of revolutions and rebellions – chronological listing
- Soft coup
