= List of coups and coup attempts by country =

List of coups and coup attempts

This is a list of coups d'état and coup attempts by country, listed in chronological order. According to a report in the Journal of Peace Research, a coup is the illegal overthrow of a government (as opposed to legal coercion). Scholars generally consider a coup successful when the usurpers are able to maintain control of the government for at least seven days.

== Afghanistan ==
1. February 20, 1919: Nasrullah Khan overthrew Habibullah Khan.
2. February 28, 1919: Amanullah Khan overthrew Nasrullah Khan.
3. January 17, 1929: Habibullāh Kalakāni overthrew Inayatullah Khan.
4. October 16, 1929: Mohammad Nadir Shah overthew Habibullāh Kalakāni.
5. July 17, 1973: Mohammed Daoud Khan overthrew Mohammad Zahir Shah.
6. December 9, 1976: Qiyam-i Islami (Islamic Uprising) attempted and failed to overthrow Mohammad Daoud Khan.
7. April 30, 1978: Abdul Qadir overthrew Mohammed Daoud Khan.
8. September 16, 1979: Hafizullah Amin overthrew Nur Muhammad Taraki.
9. December 27, 1979: Babrak Karmal overthrew Hafizullah Amin.
10. March 6, 1990: Shahnawaz Tanai attempted and failed to overthrow Mohammad Najibullah.
11. April 2002: failed coup by members of hardline Islamist Gulbuddin Hekmatyar's Hezbi Islami against Afghan Interim Administration leader Hamid Karzai, which included killing former king Mohammed Zahir Shah on his planned return to Afghanistan.

== Albania ==
1. 1914: The Peasant Revolt in Albania, also known as the Islamic Revolt or Muslim Uprising in Albania, was an uprising of peasants from central Albania, mostly Muslims, against the regime of Wilhelm, Prince of Albania in 1914. It was one of the reasons for the prince's withdrawal from the country, which marked the fall of the Principality of Albania. The uprising was led by Muslim leaders Haxhi Qamili, Arif Hiqmeti, Musa Qazimi, and Mustafa Ndroqi.
2. June–December 1924: The June Revolution (Albanian: Kryengritja e Qershorit or Lëvizja e Qershorit), also known as the Antibourgeois Democratic Revolution (Albanian: Revolucioni Demokrat Antiborgjez), was a peasant insurgency backed by the parliamentary opposition to the Zogu government, following the 1923 Albanian parliamentary election. Fan Noli became the Prime Minister of Albania.
3. September 14, 1998: The funeral of Azem Hajdari, a Member of Parliament, turned violent as the office of the Albanian prime minister Fatos Nano was attacked, obliging Nano to hastily flee and step down shortly after. His party remained in power.

== Algeria ==
1. July 3, 1962: Houari Boumédiène and Ahmed Ben Bella overthrew Benyoucef Benkhedda.
2. June 19, 1965: Houari Boumédiène overthrew Ahmed Ben Bella.
3. December 14–16, 1967: Colonel Tahar Zbiri failed to overthrow Houari Boumédiène.
4. January 11, 1992: Khaled Nezzar overthrew Chadli Bendjedid.
5. On April 2, 2019, the president Abdelaziz Bouteflika resigned under pressure from the military, following the 2019–2021 Algerian protests

== Angola ==
1. May 27, 1977: The Minister of Interior Nito Alves failed to overthrow Agostinho Neto.

== Argentina ==
1. September 6, 1930: General José Félix Uriburu and the Nacionalistas overthrew President Hipólito Yrigoyen and suspended the 1853 Constitution.
2. December 18, 1932: failed military uprising against Agustín Pedro Justo by Atilio Cattáneo and the Radical Civic Union.
3. June 4, 1943: the military overthrew president Ramón Castillo.
4. September 28, 1951: failed military revolt against President Juan Perón by Benjamín Menéndez.
5. September 16–23, 1955: the military, led by General Eduardo Lonardi, overthrew president Juan Perón.
6. June 6, 1956: failed military uprising, led by General Juan José Valle, against de facto President Pedro Eugenio Aramburu.
7. June 19, 1959: failed military uprising against Arturo Frondizi by Arturo Ossorio Arana.
8. November 30, 1960: failed military uprising against Arturo Frondizi by Miguel Ángel Iñíguez.
9. March 29, 1962: the military, led by General Raúl Poggi, overthrew President Arturo Frondizi.
10. 21 September 1962 – 5 April 1963: a revolt by Anti Peronist elements of the Argentine Navy after the government decided to allow Peronist candidates to run for political office.
11. June 28, 1966: a military uprising led by General Juan Carlos Onganía overthrew president Arturo Umberto Illia.
12. December 18–22, 1975: failed military uprising against Isabel Perón by Jesús Orlando Cappellini.
13. March 24, 1976: Jorge Videla overthrew Isabel Perón and established the National Reorganization Process.
14. December 11, 1981: the military overthrew Roberto Viola, with Leopoldo Galtieri being appointed president of Argentina one week later.

== Armenia ==
1. May 10–14, 1920: Uprising by Pro-Bolshevik forces in Yerevan.
2. February 25, 2021: the Armenian military called for Prime Minister Nikol Pashinyan to resign, similar to the 1997 Turkish military memorandum
3. September 2023: The Armenian government announced it had foiled a coup plot by a militia.
4. September 18, 2024: Several people were arrested for taking part in a plot to install a pro-Russian government.
5. June 25, 2025: 15 people were arrested on charges of planning a coup to overthrow Prime Minister Nikol Pashinyan.

== Australia ==
=== Pre-federation ===
1. January 26, 1808: the New South Wales Corps overthrew William Bligh, Governor of New South Wales, and installed Major George Johnston as acting lieutenant-governor.

=== Federation ===
1. November 11, 1975: Opposition leader Malcolm Fraser and Governor-General John Kerr committed a 'soft coup' when Kerr dismissed Prime Minister Gough Whitlam and replaced him with Fraser.

== Austria ==
1. 1931: Attempted coup by members of the Heimwehr paramilitary group, led by Walter Pfrimer.
2. March 15, 1933: Self-coup by Chancellor Engelbert Dollfuss, which effectively ended democracy and the First Republic.
3. July 25, 1934: the Austrian Nazi Party and the Austrian SS attempted to overthrow the Fatherland Front government in the Federal State of Austria, resulting in the assassination of Chancellor Engelbert Dollfuss and his succession by Kurt Schuschnigg.
4. April 2017: Austrian police arrested members of the far right for plotting a coup.

== Azerbaijan ==
1. June 9, 1993: Heydar Aliyev overthrew Abulfaz Elchibey during the First Nagorno-Karabakh War
2. March 13, 1995: Colonel Rovshan Javadov and his unit of OPON troops failed to seize power from President Heydar Aliyev and reinstate his predecessor Abulfaz Elchibey after Turkish president Süleyman Demirel warned Aliyev.
3. May 16, 2023: Alleged Iran-backed coup plot.
4. 2025 Azerbaijani coup plot

== Bahrain ==
1. 1895: attempted coup by Shubar al-Sitri.
2. December 16, 1981: Seventy-three members of the Islamic Front for the Liberation of Bahrain were arrested by the Bahraini government for attempting to orchestrate a coup. The coup was allegedly assisted by Iran, although the Iranian government denied this claim.

== Bangladesh ==
1. August 15, 1975: Khondaker Mostaq Ahmad overthrew the BaKSAL government of Sheikh Mujibur Rahman.
2. November 3, 1975: Khaled Mosharraf overthrew the government set up by the August coup.
3. November 7, 1975: Soldiers from the Bangladesh Army overthrew and killed Khaled Mosharraf just a few days after he took power.
4. May 30, 1981: Soldiers led by Major General Mohammad Abdul Monjur assassinated President Ziaur Rahman. They failed to seize power and were rounded up.
5. March 24, 1982: Hussain Muhammad Ershad overthrew President Abdus Sattar.
6. May 1996: Abu Saleh Mohammad Nasim attempted and failed to overthrow Abdur Rahman Biswas.
7. January 11, 2007: General Moeen U Ahmed pressured President Iajuddin Ahmed into declaring a state of emergency, postponing elections, and appointing a new Chief Advisor to head the caretaker government.
8. December 2011: Rebel army officers attempted and failed to overthrow Sheikh Hasina.
9. July Uprising: On 5 August, Prime Minister Sheikh Hasina was overthrown by the military of Bangladesh.

== Belgium ==
=== Austrian Netherlands ===
1. June 18, 1789: The Austrian Imperial Army occupied the Great Market of Brussels, dissolved the States of Brabant and Council of Brabant, and tried to arrest all its members.

=== United Belgian States ===
1. March 1790: Statist coup was carried out against the Vonckists.

=== Kingdom of Belgium ===
1. February 2, 1831: The Orangist movement launched an unsuccessful coup in Belgium.

== Benin ==
=== Kingdom of Dahomey ===
1. 1818: A coup, supported by the slave trader Francisco Félix de Souza, overthrew King Adandozan and enthroned Ghezo.

=== Republic of Dahomey ===
1. October 28, 1963: Christophe Soglo overthrew Hubert Maga and the Dahomeyan Unity Party.
2. November 27, 1965: Christophe Soglo overthrew Sourou-Migan Apithy.
3. December 16, 1967: Maurice Kouandété overthrew Christophe Soglo.
4. December 10, 1969: Maurice Kouandété overthrew Emile Derlin Zinsou.
5. October 26, 1972: Mathieu Kérékou overthrew Justin Ahomadégbé-Tomêtin.

=== People's Republic of Benin ===
1. January 17, 1977: French-led mercenaries attempted to overthrow Mathieu Kérékou and the People's Revolutionary Party of Benin government.

=== Republic of Benin ===
1. March 4, 2013: Failed coup attempt by Colonel Pamphile Zomahoun against President Thomas Boni Yayi.
2. September 26, 2024: 3 people arrested on charges of organising a coup.
3. December 7, 2025: members of the Beninese Armed Forces attempted to overthrow President Patrice Talon

== Bolivia ==
1. April 18, 1828: Military revolt. Antonio José de Sucre was wounded in the arm and resigned.
2. December 31, 1828 to January 1, 1829: President Pedro Blanco Soto was deposed and killed in a coup led by José Ballivián.
3. January 22, 1839: José Miguel de Velasco overthrew Andrés de Santa Cruz.
4. June 10, 1841: Sebastián Ágreda overthrew José Miguel de Velasco.
5. September 22, 1841: José Ballivián overthrew Mariano Enrique Calvo.
6. January 2, 1848: Manuel Isidoro Belzu overthrew Eusebio Guilarte and installed José Miguel de Velasco as president.
7. December 6, 1848: Manuel Isidoro Belzu overthrew José Miguel de Velasco; failed counter-coup by Velasco.
8. 1854: Failed military revolt, with notable participant Mariano Melgarejo, against Manuel Isidoro Belzu.
9. September 9, 1857: José María Linares overthrew Jorge Córdova.
10. January 14, 1861: José María de Achá, Ruperto Fernández, and Manuel Antonio Sánchez overthrew José María Linares.
11. December 28, 1864: Mariano Melgarejo overthrew José María de Achá.
12. January 15, 1871: Agustín Morales overthrew Mariano Melgarejo.
13. May 4, 1876: Hilarión Daza overthrew Tomás Frías.
14. December 28, 1879: Hilarión Daza was declared deposed and, in his absence, Narciso Campero was proclaimed president on January 19, 1880.
15. April 12, 1899: José Manuel Pando overthrew Severo Fernández.
16. August 12, 1920: Bautista Saavedra overthrew José Gutiérrez.
17. June 28, 1930: Carlos Blanco Galindo overthrew Hernando Siles Reyes' ministerial cabinet.
18. November 27, 1934: Military revolt. Germán Busch, under the orders of David Toro and Enrique Peñaranda, overthrew Daniel Salamanca Urey and installed Vice President José Luis Tejada Sorzano as president.
19. May 17, 1936: Germán Busch overthrew José Luis Tejada Sorzano and installed David Toro as president.
20. July 13, 1937: Germán Busch overthrew David Toro.
21. December 20, 1943: Gualberto Villarroel overthrew Enrique Peñaranda.
22. July 21, 1946: An enraged mob lynched Gualberto Villarroel. Néstor Guillén, and then Tomás Monje, were installed as interim presidents.
23. May 16, 1951: Mamerto Urriolagoitía enacted a self-coup and installed General Hugo Ballivián as president to stop President-elect Víctor Paz Estenssoro from taking office.
24. April 11, 1952: Hernán Siles Zuazo overthrew Hugo Ballivián and installed Víctor Paz Estenssoro as president.
25. November 5, 1964: René Barrientos and Alfredo Ovando Candía overthrew Víctor Paz Estenssoro.
26. September 26, 1969: Alfredo Ovando Candía overthrew Luis Adolfo Siles Salinas.
27. October 6, 1970: Military revolt. Three armed forces chiefs overthrew Alfredo Ovando Candía but ruled for less than a day before Ovando loyalists under Juan José Torres took back control. Ovando agreed to entrust the presidency to Torres.
28. August 21, 1971: Hugo Banzer overthrew Juan José Torres.
29. November 7, 1974: Failed military revolt. Hugo Banzer banned all political activity and ruled solely with military support.
30. July 21, 1978: Juan Pereda overthrew the transitional military junta.
31. November 24, 1978: David Padilla overthrew Juan Pereda.
32. November 1, 1979: Alberto Natusch overthrew Wálter Guevara.
33. July 17, 1980: Luis García Meza overthrew Lidia Gueiler Tejada.
34. June 30, 1984: Failed military coup attempt arrests Hernán Siles Zuazo for ten hours.
35. 2019 Bolivian political crisis
36. June 26, 2024: Attempted coup by former General Juan José Zúñiga against Luis Arce.

== Brazil ==
TV Senado video on Lott's 1955 countercoup (eng. subs).

1. July 30, 1832: a failed coup by Diogo Feijó.
2. November 15, 1889: Deodoro da Fonseca and the Imperial Brazilian Army overthrew Pedro II of Brazil and the Empire of Brazil and established the First Brazilian Republic.
3. November 3, 1891: Deodoro da Fonseca dissolved the National Congress during the Encilhamento crisis.
4. November 23, 1891: Floriano Peixoto took power without calling for new elections, in violation of the Constitution.
5. November 15, 1904: Attempted military coup during the Vaccine Revolt.
6. December 1915: a coup plot against Venceslau Brás.
7. July 5, 1922: a failed military coup to prevent the inauguration of Artur Bernardes.
8. November 3, 1930: Getúlio Vargas overthrew Washington Luís and prevented the inauguration of Júlio Prestes.
9. November 10, 1937: Getúlio Vargas dissolved the National Congress, installing the Estado Novo dictatorship.
10. October 29, 1945: A military coup d'état deposed Getúlio Vargas, installing the Second Brazilian Republic.
11. August 24, 1954: Possible coup d'état was averted after Getúlio Vargas committed suicide.
12. November 11, 1955: A coup d'état to prevent Juscelino Kubitschek from assuming the presidency failed after general Henrique Lott carried out a countercoup.
13. February 10, 1956: The Brazilian Air Force revolted against Juscelino Kubitschek in the Revolta de Jacareacanga.
14. December 2, 1959: Air Force military hijacked a civilian airplane and attempted a coup against Juscelino Kubitschek, in the Aragarças Revolt.
15. August 25 to September 7, 1961: Military tried to prevent João Goulart from being sworn into the presidency after Jânio Quadros resigned. After a civilian campaign and support from legalist members of the military, a coup was averted when a parliamentary regime was adopted, curbing presidential powers (later reverted).
16. September 12, 1963: Displeased lower-ranking military personnel rebelled in Brasília after the Supreme Federal Court reaffirmed their ineligibility for legislative posts, in the Sergeants' Revolt.
17. March 31, 1964: Humberto de Alencar Castelo Branco overthrew João Goulart, establishing the 21-year-long dictatorship.
18. August 31, 1969: The military prevented Pedro Aleixo, civilian vice-president and legal successor according to the military dictatorship's recently enacted constitution, from assuming power after Costa e Silva suffered a stroke.
19. December 2022: 2022 Brazilian Coup plot.
20. January 8, 2023: Supporters of former president Jair Bolsonaro stormed the National Congress, Supreme Federal Court and Planalto Palace in Brasília, in an effort to overturn the result of the 2022 Brazilian general election and called for a military coup against President Luiz Inácio Lula da Silva. See also: Planning for a coup d'état after the 2022 Brazilian presidential elections.

== Bulgaria ==
1. April 27, 1881: This was a self-coup by Knyaz Alexander of Battenberg, who dismissed the government of Petko Karavelov and suspended the Tarnovo Constitution.
2. August 9, 1886: An attempted dethroning of Knyaz Alexander of Battenberg.
3. June 9, 1923: The Military Union overthrew Aleksandar Stamboliyski and installed coup leader Aleksandar Tsankov in power.
4. May 19, 1934: Zveno, led by Kimon Georgiev with the help of the Military Union, overthrew the coalition government led by the Democratic Party.
5. September 9, 1944: Zveno and the Fatherland Front, led by Kimon Georgiev, overthrew Konstantin Muraviev after the Soviet invasion of Bulgaria.
6. April 1965: A plot within the Bulgarian Communist Party to overthrow Todor Zhivkov and establish an anti-Soviet Communist government was foiled.
7. November 10, 1989: Todor Zhivkov was ousted in a palace coup within the Bulgarian Communist Party.

== Burkina Faso ==
=== Upper Volta ===
1. January 3, 1966: Lieutenant Colonel Sangoulé Lamizana overthrew President Maurice Yaméogo.
2. February 8, 1974: A self-coup, orchestrated by President General Sangoulé Lamizana (in office since the 1966 coup), against the RDA-led government of Prime Minister Gérard Kango Ouédraogo.
3. November 25, 1980: Colonel Saye Zerbo overthrew President Sangoulé Lamizana.
4. November 7, 1982: Major Jean-Baptiste Ouédraogo overthrew President Saye Zerbo.
5. February 28, 1983: Failed coup attempt against President Jean-Baptiste Ouédraogo.
6. August 4, 1983: Captain Blaise Compaoré overthrew President Jean-Baptiste Ouédraogo, replacing him with Captain Thomas Sankara.

=== Burkina Faso ===
1. October 15, 1987: Blaise Compaoré overthrew Thomas Sankara.
2. September 18, 1989: Alleged failed coup attempt by senior officers against President Blaise Compaoré.
3. October 2003: The attempted coup was carried out against long-time strongman President Blaise Compaoré and his CDP regime, and resulted in the imprisonment of several members of the military and political dissidents.
4. October 30, 2014: Lt. Colonel Yacouba Isaac Zida overthrew current president Blaise Compaoré and briefly served as head of state before selecting Michel Kafando as the new president. Days later, Kafando appointed Zida as acting prime minister.
5. September 17, 2015: The presidential guard headed by Gilbert Diendéré overthrew interim president Michel Kafando one month before elections. However, the coup collapsed one week later and Kafando was reinstalled.
6. October 8, 2016: Blaise Compaoré loyalists and former presidential guards failed to overthrow President Roch Marc Christian Kaboré.
7. January 23, 2022: President Roch Marc Christian Kaboré was reported to have been detained by the soldiers at the military camp in the capital. On January 24, the military announced on television that Kaboré had been deposed from his position as president. After the announcement, the military declared that the parliament, government and constitution had been dissolved.
8. September 30, 2022: The coup removed interim president Paul-Henri Sandaogo Damiba over his alleged inability to deal with the country's Islamist insurgency. Captain Ibrahim Traoré took over as interim leader.
9. September 26, 2023: failed coup attempt against President Ibrahim Traore.
10. January 14, 2024: attempted coup crushed by military.
11. April 16, 2025: attempt to overthrow Ibrahim Traoré foiled after plotters were arrested.
12. January 7 2026: Burkina Faso announced that an attempted assassination of Ibrahim Traoré was thwarted. According to DW Africa, this is the fifth coup attempt in Burkina Faso since 2023.

== Burundi ==
1. October 18–19, 1965: Failed coup against Mwambutsa IV of Burundi.
2. July 8, 1966: Ntare V overthrew Mwambutsa IV.
3. November 28, 1966: Michel Micombero overthrew Ntare V.
4. November 10, 1976: Jean-Baptiste Bagaza overthrew Michel Micombero.
5. September 3, 1987: Pierre Buyoya overthrew Jean-Baptiste Bagaza.
6. October 21 to November 1993: Failed coup that led to the assassination of Melchior Ndadaye.
7. July 25, 1996: Pierre Buyoya overthrew Sylvestre Ntibantunganya.
8. April 18, 2001: Failed coup against Pierre Buyoya.
9. May 13–15, 2015: Failed coup d'état led by General Godefroid Niyombare against President Pierre Nkurunziza.

== Cambodia ==
1. 1959: Coup plot by right wing politicians with support from Thailand and South Vietnam.
2. March 18, 1970: Lon Nol overthrew Norodom Sihanouk.
3. July 2, 1994: Attempted coup by Norodom Chakrapong and General Sin Song.
4. July 5, 1997: Hun Sen overthrew Norodom Ranariddh.
5. November 20, 2000: Attempted coup against Prime Minister Hun Sen.

== Cameroon ==
1. April 6, 1984: Presidential palace guards failed to overthrow president Paul Biya.

== Central African Republic ==
1. January 1, 1966: Jean-Bédel Bokassa overthrew David Dacko.
2. 1974: General Martin Lingoupou attempted to overthrow Jean-Bédel Bokassa.
3. 1975: There was an attempt to overthrow Jean-Bédel Bokassa.
4. 1976: Groups of soldiers try to overthrow Jean-Bédel Bokassa.
5. September 21, 1979: David Dacko overthrew Jean-Bédel Bokassa with French military support.
6. September 1, 1981: André Kolingba overthrew David Dacko.
7. 1982: Ange-Félix Patassé, François Bozizé, and Alphonse Mbaïkoua, attempted to overthrow André Kolingba.
8. 1996: Soldiers attempted to overthrow Patassé.
9. May 27–28, 2001: There was a failed coup attempt against Ange-Félix Patassé.
10. October 25–31, 2002: François Bozizé attempted to overthrow Patassé.
11. March 15, 2003: François Bozizé overthrew Ange-Félix Patassé.
12. March 24, 2013: Michel Djotodia overthrew François Bozizé.
13. September 26 to October 3, 2015: Failed attempt by Haroun Gaye and Eugene Ngaïkosset to overthrow Catherine Samba-Panza.
14. January 13, 2021: A coup attempt by rebel groups, led by former president François Bozizé, against Faustin-Archange Touadéra fails.

== Chad ==
1. April 13, 1975: Noël Milarew Odingar overthrew François Tombalbaye.
2. June 7, 1982: Hissène Habré overthrew Goukouni Oueddei.
3. December 1, 1990: Idriss Déby overthrew Hissène Habré.
4. May 16, 2004: Failed coup against President Idriss Déby.
5. March 14, 2006: Failed coup against President Idriss Déby.
6. May 1, 2013: Failed coup against Idriss Déby.
7. 2021 Northern Chad offensive
8. January 9, 2025: Failed coup against Mahamat Idriss Déby.

== Chile ==
1. 1781: A failed attempt to declare Chile an independent republic.
2. September 18, 1810: A successful coup in favor of home rule in Chile.
3. April 1, 1811: A failed attempt to restore royal power in Chile.
4. September 4, 1811: A successful coup in favor of José Miguel Carrera.
5. 1827: A failed attempt to destroy the opposition to the federalist system.
6. June 1828: San Fernando mutiny, led by Pedro Urriola, José Antonio Vidaurre, and the Maipo Battalion.
7. 1829: An armed conflict between conservatives and liberals over the constitutional regime.
8. 1831: Arauco rebellion led by Pedro Barnechea and Captain Uriarte.
9. 1832: Rebellion of Cazadores de Quechereguas Regiment, under Captain Eusebio Ruiz.
10. 1833: Arteaga Conspiracy led by General Zenteno and Coronel Picarte.
11. 1833: Cotapos revolution, led by José Antonio Pérez de Cotapos.
12. 1836: An invasion of Chiloé Island and failed attempt to depose the government.
13. 1837: A failed attempt to depose the government that resulted in the death of Diego Portales.
14. 1851: An armed rebellion by liberals against the conservative President Manuel Montt.
15. 1859: A rekindling of the armed rebellion by liberals against the conservative President Manuel Montt that began in 1851.
16. 1891: An armed conflict between forces supporting National Congress and forces supporting President José Manuel Balmaceda.
17. 1891–94: Several Balmacedist plots, planned by Hernán Abos-Padilla, Nicanor Donoso, Diego Bahamondes, Luis Leclerc, Herminio Euth, José Domingo Briceño, Edmundo Pinto, Manuel and Emilio Rodríguez, Virgilio Talquino, and Anselmo Blanlot against the new government.
18. 1912: A failed plot against President Ramón Barros Luco. In September, Gonzalo Bulnes the appointed leader of the plot, desisted.
19. 1919: A failed plot by Generals Guillermo Armstrong and Manuel Moore against President Juan Luis Sanfuentes.
20. September 5, 1924: A successful coup against President Arturo Alessandri.
21. January 23, 1925: A successful coup in which Carlos Ibáñez del Campo and Marmaduke Grove overthrew Luis Altamirano to return President Arturo Alessandri to office.
22. September 21, 1930: A failed attempt against President Carlos Ibáñez del Campo by Marmaduke Grove.
23. July 26, 1931: Successful rebellion against Carlos Ibáñez del Campo.
24. September 1931: A rebellion in the Chilean Navy against Vice-president Manuel Trucco that ended with the fleet being bombed from the air.
25. December 25, 1931: A failed Communist putsch against President Juan Esteban Montero.
26. June 4, 1932: A successful coup that resulted in the instauration of the Socialist Republic of Chile, in which Carlos Dávila overthrew Juan Esteban Montero.
27. September 27, 1932: A successful coup of General Pedro Vignola that resulted in the resignation of President Bartolomé Blanche and a return to civilian rule.
28. 1933: A failed plot against President Arturo Alessandri. Commander-in-Chief of the army, Pedro Vignola, called "to resist the Milicia Republicana by any means."
29. 1935: Humberto Videla's plot, failed rebellion of NCOs.
30. 1936: plot against Alessandri by René Silva Espejo and Alejandro Lagos.
31. September 5, 1938: A failed National Socialist attempt in favor of Carlos Ibáñez del Campo that resulted in the murder of 59 young party members.
32. August 25, 1939: A failed attempt by Ariosto Herrera against President Pedro Aguirre Cerda.
33. 1948: A failed plot against President Gabriel González Videla.
34. 1954: A failed plot to allow President Carlos Ibáñez del Campo to assume dictatorial powers.
35. June 29, 1973: A failed coup against President Salvador Allende.
36. September 11, 1973: A successful coup against President Salvador Allende (resulting in his suicide), in favor of Augusto Pinochet.

== China ==
=== Imperial China ===
1. February 2, 249: Sima Yi initiated a coup against the Cao Wei regent Cao Shuang.
2. July 2, 626: During the Xuanwu Gate Incident, Prince Li Shimin and his close followers killed Crown Prince Li Jiancheng and Prince Li Yuanji before taking complete control of the Tang government from Emperor Gaozu.
3. February 960 – Coup at Chen Bridge: during the Later Zhou dynasty, one of its distinguished military generals, Zhao Kuangyin, staged a coup d'état, forcing the last ruler of the dynasty, Emperor Gong, to abdicate the throne in his favor. Thus the general Zhao Kuangyin became Emperor Taizu who founded the Song Dynasty, reigning from 960 until his death in 976.
4. September 4, 1323: Coup d'état at Nanpo against Gegeen Khan (alias Emperor Yingzong of Yuan, or Shidibala).
5. 1856 – The Taiping rebellion: East King Yang Xiuqing attempts to take control of the Taiping Heavenly Kingdom from Heavenly King Hong Xiuquan, but he and his followers are killed.
6. 1861: With the help of Prince Gong, Empress Dowager Cixi ousted eight regents (led by Sushun) whom the Xianfeng Emperor had appointed on his deathbed to rule for the child Tongzhi Emperor.
7. September 21, 1898 – Wuxu Coup: In response to the Hundred Days' Reform, Empress Dowager Cixi took power from the Guangxu Emperor.
8. February 12, 1912: Qing general Yuan Shikai, by agreement with Sun Yat-sen and his Provisional Government, forced Emperor Puyi to abdicate and established the Beiyang government, ending the Qing Dynasty.

=== Republic of China ===
1. Late 1913 to January 1914: Yuan Shikai crackdown on the Chinese National Assembly.
2. December 12, 1915: Yuan Shikai launches a self-coup by establishing the Empire of China, with himself as the Emperor of China.
3. June 14, 1917: Qing-loyalist general Zhang Xun overthrew Chinese president Li Yuanhong and later proclaim the restoration of the Qing Empire with Puyi as emperor.
4. July 12, 1917: Brief restoration attempt was crushed by troops loyal to warlord Duan Qirui.
5. July 19, 1920: Cao Kun and Zhang Zuolin overthrew Duan Qirui.
6. January 25, 1922: Wu Peifu overthrew Liang Shiyi causing the First Zhili-Fengtian War.
7. October 23, 1924: Feng Yuxiang overthrew Cao Kun.
8. April 18, 1926: Zhang Xueliang and Wu Peifu captured the capital, Beijing, and then sacked the city, leading to the collapse of the Beiyang government and the near destruction of Guominjun faction.
9. April 12, 1927: Chiang Kai-shek orders a purge of communists in his Kuomintang party to ensure right-wing dominance in the party.
10. June 2, 1928: Yan Xishan (allied with Chiang Kai-shek) overthrew Zhang Zuolin.
11. April 1930: Yan Xishan expelled Chiang Kai-shek's supporters from Beijing, starting the Central Plains War.
12. December 12, 1936 to December 25, 1936: Zhang Xueliang kidnapped Chiang Kai-shek to force him to establish a united Anti-Japanese front with the Communist Party against the Japanese occupation of Manchuria.

=== People's Republic of China ===
1. 1967: During the Cultural Revolution, a group of Maoist rebels overthrew the Shanghai Municipal Committee and established a commune. The commune eventually collapsed due to lack of external support.
2. 1971: A failed coup plot to overthrow Mao Zedong.
3. October 6, 1976: the Gang of Four, who allegedly tried to take over the government after the death of chairman Mao Zedong in September, are arrested.

== Colombia ==
=== Gran Colombia ===
1. August 27, 1828: After the failure of the Convention of Ocaña, Simón Bolívar performs a self-coup by declaring a dictatorship under the title of "President-Liberator."
2. September 25, 1828: A failed conspiracy that attempted to assassinate Simón Bolívar.
3. September 4, 1830: Rafael Urdaneta overthrew Joaquín Mosquera.

=== Modern State ===
1. April 17, 1854: José María Melo overthrew José María Obando.
2. July 18, 1861: Tomás Cipriano de Mosquera overthrew Julio Arboleda Pombo.
3. May 23, 1867: Santos Acosta overthrew Tomás Cipriano de Mosquera.
4. July 31, 1900: Vice President José Manuel Marroquín overthrew Manuel Antonio Sanclemente.
5. July 4, 1909: A coup attempt against Jorge Holguín by supporters of Ramón González Valencia.
6. July 10, 1944: coup attempt against Alfonso López Pumarejo by some soldiers.
7. June 13, 1953: Gustavo Rojas Pinilla overthrew Laureano Gómez.
8. May 10, 1957: Gustavo Rojas Pinilla was overthrown by the Colombian Military Junta.
9. May 2, 1958: The Colombian junta foiled a coup attempt led by Hernando Forero Gómez, with reported intentions to disrupt the 1958 election and restore Gustavo Rojas Pinilla to power.

== Comoros ==
1. August 3, 1975: Said Mohamed Jaffar and Bob Denard overthrew Ahmed Abdallah.
2. May 23, 1978: Ahmed Abdallah and Bob Denard overthrew Ali Soilih.
3. November 26, 1989: Said Mohamed Djohar and Bob Denard overthrew Ahmed Abdallah.
4. September 28, 1995: Bob Denard overthrew Said Mohamed Djohar for seven days.
5. April 30, 1999: Azali Assoumani overthrew Tadjidine Ben Said Massounde.
6. April 20, 2013: A failed coup against President Ikililou Dhoinine.

== Congo, Democratic Republic of the ==
1. September 14, 1960: Joseph-Désiré Mobutu (later Mobutu Sese Seko) overthrew Patrice Lumumba.
2. November 25, 1965: Joseph-Désiré Mobutu (later Mobutu Sese Seko) overthrew Joseph Kasa-Vubu.
3. May 16, 1997: Laurent-Désiré Kabila overthrew Mobutu Sese Seko, leading to the First Congo War.
4. March 28, 2004: Former members of the elite unit of ex-dictator Mobutu Sese Seko's protection group attempted to overthrow the government through attacks in Kinshasa, but failed.
5. June 11, 2004: Eric Lenge planned to overthrow Joseph Kabila but was foiled.
6. February 27, 2011: Coup attempt against Joseph Kabila.
7. December 30, 2013: attempted coup by followers of Paul Joseph Mukungubila.
8. February 8, 2022: An alleged coup to overthrow Félix Tshisekedi.
9. May 19, 2024: members of the New Zaire Movement attempted to overthrow Félix Tshisekedi.

== Congo, Republic of the ==
1. August 15, 1963: Alphonse Massamba-Débat overthrew Fulbert Youlou.
2. June 27-July 1966: Marien Ngouabi attempted to overthrow Alphonse Massamba-Debat.
3. September 4, 1968: Marien Ngouabi overthrew Alphonse Massamba-Débat.
4. 1972: attempted coup against Marien Ngouabi.
5. February 8, 1979: Denis Sassou Nguesso overthrew Joachim Yhombi-Opango.
6. 1987: attempted coup against Denis Sassou Nguesso.
7. October 25, 1997: Denis Sassou Nguesso overthrew Pascal Lissouba.

== Costa Rica ==
1. March 29, 1823: Joaquín de Oreamuno overthrew Rafael Francisco Osejo.
2. April 27, 1870: Bruno Carranza overthrew Jesús Jiménez Zamora.
3. July 30, 1876: Vicente Herrera Zeledón overthrew Aniceto Esquivel Sáenz.
4. January 27, 1917: Federico Tinoco Granados overthrew Alfredo González Flores.
5. April 24, 1948: José Figueres Ferrer overthrew Teodoro Picado Michalski.
6. April 3, 1949: Public Security Minister Edgar Cardona Quirós led a failed attempt to overthrow José Figueres Ferrer.
7. January 1955: Failed attempt to overthrow José Figueres Ferrer.

== Cuba ==
1. September 3, 1933: Fulgencio Batista ousted Carlos Manuel de Céspedes y Quesada.
2. March 10, 1952: Batista overthrew Carlos Prío Socarrás.
3. 1956: Coup attempt against Batista by Colonel Ramon M. Barquin
4. January 1, 1959: Fidel Castro and his communist revolutionaries overthrew the Fulgencio Batista government.
5. April 17–20, 1961: A collaborative coup/invasion attempt by Cuban opposition and the United States fails to topple Fidel Castro.

== Curaçao ==
1. December 1, 1796: Johann Lauffer overthrew Jan Jacob Beaujon as governor.

== Cyprus ==
1. 1972–1973: Three bishops of the Greek Orthodox Church attempted to overthrow Archbishop Makarios III as President of Cyprus.
2. July 15, 1974: Nikos Sampson, with support from EOKA B and the National Guard, overthrew Makarios III.

== Czechia ==
=== Kingdom of Bohemia ===
1. 6 September 1427 [cs]: a coalition of moderate Hussites and Catholic nobles attempted to overthrow the radical Hussite faction in Prague.

=== Czechoslovakia ===
1. 1926–28 Gajda Affair: Rumored coup plots by Radola Gajda and the Czechoslovak Army against President Tomáš Garrigue Masaryk's government.
2. 21–22 January 1933 Židenický puč.: coup attempt by members of the National Fascist Community in Brno.
3. 1938: Failed coup by Konrad Henlein.
4. February 25, 1948: the Communist Party of Czechoslovakia under Klement Gottwald eliminates all liberal constituents from power.
5. May 17, 1949: Failed coup by Květoslav Prokeš.

== Denmark ==
1. 1660: Frederick III of Denmark declared a state of emergency after the Dano-Swedish War to establish an absolute hereditary monarchy .
2. 1772: Juliana Maria of Brunswick-Wolfenbüttel, her advisor Ove Høegh-Guldberg, and her son Hereditary Prince Frederick threw a palace coup against Queen Caroline Matilda of Great Britain and her lover Johann Friedrich Struensee, who had come to dominate the Danish court due to the mental illness of King Christian VII.
3. 1784: Crown Prince Frederick of Denmark overthrew Juliana Maria's clique. The Crown Prince became regent.

== Dominica ==
1. April 27, 1981: Failed coup attempt by American and Canadian Neo-Nazi white supremacist and Ku Klux Klan leaders James Alexander McQuirter and Don Black to overthrow Prime Minister Eugenia Charles and restore Prime Minister Patrick John.
2. 1981: attempted coup by head of the Dominica Defence Force Frederick Newton against Eugenia Charles. Newton was sentenced to death and executed in 1986.

== Dominican Republic ==
1. May 29, 1849: Pedro Santana overthrew Manuel Jimenes.
2. August 4, 1865: José María Cabral overthrew Pedro Antonio Pimentel.
3. October 5, 1876: Ignacio María González overthrew Ulises Francisco Espaillat.
4. 1878: Buenaventura Báez was overthrown.
5. December 6, 1879: Gregorio Luperón overthrew Cesáreo Guillermo.
6. May 2, 1902: Horacio Vásquez overthrew Juan Isidro Jimenes.
7. March 23, 1903: Alejandro Woss y Gil overthrew Horacio Vásquez.
8. November 24, 1903: Carlos Morales Languasco overthrew Alejandro Woss y Gil.
9. March 3, 1930: Rafael Trujillo and Rafael Estrella Ureña overthrew Horacio Vásquez.
10. September 25, 1963: Elías Wessin y Wessin overthrew Juan Bosch, leading to the Dominican Civil War.

== Ecuador ==
1. 1925: Coup by Luis Telmo Paz y Miño.
2. 1935: Coup by Federico Páez.
3. 1963: Coup by Ramón Castro Jijón.
4. 1972: Coup by Guillermo Rodríguez.
5. 1975: failed attempt by General Raúl González Alvear.
6. 2000: Coup by Lucio Gutiérrez.
7. 2010: Coup by the National Police of Ecuador.

== Egypt ==
=== Ancient Egypt ===
1. 1155 BC: Tiye, a Queen consort of Egypt, overthrew and killed Pharaoh Ramesses III in a royal plot, but failed to change the line of succession.

=== Ayyubid Sultanate ===
1. 1240: As-Salih Ayyub overthrew Al-Adil II.
2. May 2, 1250: Baybars, with the support of Mamluk officers, overthrew and killed Sultan Al-Muazzam Turanshah. The fallen Ayyubid dynasty was replaced by the Mamluk dynasty.

=== Mamluk Sultanate ===
1. November 1259: Sayf ad-Din Qutuz overthrew the infant Sultan Al-Mansur Ali.

=== Modern Egypt ===
1. 1879: The Nationalist Revolution marked the beginning of the British Occupation of Egypt.
2. 1919: Attempt to stop the British Occupation of Egypt. The Kingdom of Egypt was established and recognised as an independent state.
3. 1952: Mohamed Naguib and the Free Officers Movement overthrew Farouk of Egypt, ending the Kingdom of Egypt.
4. February 27, 1954: Gamal Abdel Nasser overthrew Mohamed Naguib.
5. December 1957: Prince Muhammad Abdel Moneim attempted to overthrow Nasser and restore the monarchy.
6. June 1981: attempted military coup against Anwar Sadat.
7. 2011: Hosni Mubarak was overthrown.
8. 2013: Mohamed Morsi was overthrown by General Abdel Fattah El Sisi.

== El Salvador ==
1. December 6, 1927: An attempted military coup, financed by the Meléndez–Quiñónez dynasty leaders Jorge Meléndez and Alfonso Quiñónez Molina, failed to overthrow Pío Romero Bosque.
2. December 2, 1931 by Maximiliano Hernández Martínez.
3. April 2, 1944: Failed military coup attempt.
4. October 20, 1944: Coup by Osmín Aguirre y Salinas.
5. December 14, 1948: Coup by Manuel de Jesús Córdova.
6. October 26, 1960: A bloodless coup overthrew President José María Lemus.
7. January 25, 1961: A coup overthrew the junta established just a few months before.
8. March 25–26, 1972: Failed military coup attempt.
9. October 15, 1979: A coup d'état brought the Revolutionary Government Junta of El Salvador to power.

== England ==
1. 1553: Lord Dudley attempted to install his daughter-in-law Lady Jane Grey on the throne.
2. 1569: Rising of the North.
3. 1571: Ridolfi plot.
4. 1583: Throckmorton Plot.
5. 1586: Babington Plot.
6. 1603: Alleged Spanish-funded plot by courtiers led by Henry Brooke, 11th Baron Cobham to overthrow King James I and replace him with his cousin Lady Arbella Stuart.
7. November 5, 1605: Failed plot by a group of provincial English Catholics, including Guy Fawkes, who attempted to kill King James I and much of the Protestant aristocracy by blowing up the Houses of Parliament during the State Opening of Parliament.
8. 1641: Alleged and real Royalist plans by King Charles I to suppress the English Parliament before the First English Civil War; exposed by Parliamentarians such as John Pym.
9. 1648: Parliamentarian troops under Colonel Thomas Pride purge the Long Parliament of those opposed to trying King Charles I for treason after the English Civil War, turning it into the republican Rump Parliament and leading directly to the abolition of the monarchy.
10. April 20, 1653: Oliver Cromwell, with 40 musketeers under the command of Charles Worsley, entered the House of Commons and forcibly dissolved the Rump Parliament, leading to Cromwell becoming Lord Protector and instigating military rule.
11. 1654: Abortive Royalist conspiracy to assassinate Lord Protector Oliver Cromwell.
12. 1688–1689: William III of Orange invades England at the invitation of the country's powerful Protestants, deposing the Catholic James II of England.

== Equatorial Guinea ==
1. August 3, 1979: Teodoro Obiang Nguema Mbasogo overthrew Francisco Macías Nguema.
2. March 7, 2004: A coup attempt is stopped before the plotters can arrive in country.
3. December 24, 2017: Attempted coup by foreign mercenaries.

== Eritrea ==
1. January 21, 2013: An attempted coup against Isaias Afwerki failed.

== Estonia ==
1. December 1, 1924: failed Communist coup attempt.
2. March 12, 1934: Konstantin Päts conducted a self-coup and established authoritarian rule.
3. June 21, 1940: Soviet forces invaded Estonia and overthrew Jüri Uluots, replacing him with Johannes Vares.

== Ethiopia ==
1. 1910: Ras Tessema Nadew and Fitawrawi Habte Giyorgis overthrew Empress Taytu, regent of the incapacitated Emperor Menelik II of Ethiopia.
2. 1916: A group of aristocrats, including Fitawrawi Habte Giyorgis and Ras Tafari Makonnen, overthrow Emperor Iyasu V.
3. September 1928: Supporters of Empress Zewditu and Gugsa Wale attempted to remove Tafari Makonnen from the line of succession.
4. December 13, 1960: A group failed to overthrow Emperor Haile Selassie during a state visit.
5. September 12, 1974: Aman Mikael Andom overthrew Emperor Haile Selassie I, establishing the Derg.
6. November 17, 1974: Tafari Benti overthrew Aman Mikael Andom.
7. February 3, 1977: Mengistu Haile Mariam overthrew Tafari Benti.
8. May 16, 1989: A failed coup attempt to overthrow Mengistu Haile Mariam.
9. June 22, 2019: Failed coup against the regional government in the Amhara Region resulted in the death of several prominent Ethiopian civil and military officials.
10. October 7, 2024: Interim Regional Administration of Tigray president Getachew Reda was overthrown by the Tigray People's Liberation Front.

== Fiji ==
1. May 14, 1987: Sitiveni Rabuka overthrew Prime Minister Timoci Bavadra.
2. September 28, 1987: Sitiveni Rabuka overthrew Governor General Ratu Sir Penaia Ganilau and Queen Elizabeth II. Fiji is proclaimed a republic.
3. May 19, 2000: George Speight overthrew Mahendra Chaudhry.
4. December 5, 2006: Frank Bainimarama overthrew Laisenia Qarase.

== Finland ==
1. January 27, 1918: The radical left-wing Labour Movement failed to overthrow the Finnish Senate.
2. February 27 to March 6, 1932: The radical nationalist Lapua Movement failed to overthrow the Finnish government.

== France ==
=== Ancien Régime ===
1. 1560: an attempt to gain control of King Francis II, and remove the Guise family.
2. 1567: A failed plot by Louis, Prince of Condé to kidnap King Charles IX, caused the Second French War of Religion.
3. 1718: a plot to depose Philippe d'Orleans as regent and replace him with Philip V of Spain.

=== Revolutionary France and First Republic ===
1. August 10, 1792: The Paris Commune rallied Republican fédérés and National Guard troops to storm the Tuileries Palace, effectively deposing the French monarchy and imprisoning King Louis XVI.
2. May 31 to June 2, 1793: Montagnard-aligned sans-culottes arrested all leading Girondin ministers and deputies and executed them.
3. July 26–28, 1794: A conspiracy of anti-Robespierrist Montagnards formed an alliance to have de facto dictator Robespierre and his associates arrested and executed; they escaped but were arrested again and executed.
4. April 1, 1795: Unarmed citizens occupied the National Convention, but were driven out by the National Guard without bloodshed.
5. October 5, 1795: A royalist attempt to seize power in Paris during the Vendée rebellion was crushed by the French Revolutionary Army under the command of Napoleon Bonaparte.
6. May 1796: A radical attempt to overthrow the Directory led by Gracchus Babeuf failed.
7. September 4, 1797: The French Directory, with the support of the military, deposed the royalists.
8. May 11, 1798: The French Directory dismissed 106 Jacobin deputies from the Council of Five Hundred.
9. June 18, 1799: The Councils obtained the removal of three out of the five members of the French Directory through military pressure, leaving Emmanuel Joseph Sieyès as the dominant member of the French government.
10. November 9, 1799: Napoleon Bonaparte overthrew the French Directory and installed the French Consulate.
11. 10 October 1800: alleged plot to overthrow Napoleon.
12. February 1804: A foiled royalist plot to overthrow the Napoleonic Consulate.

=== First Empire ===
1. October 23, 1812: General Claude François de Malet failed to remove Napoleon from power while he was away on the Russian Campaign.

=== Bourbon Restoration ===
1. 1822: plot by Bonapartist officers in La Rochelle to overthrow the Bourbons.

=== July Monarchy ===
1. October 30, 1836: failed mutiny in Strasbourg led by Louis-Napoléon Bonaparte.
2. August 1840: failed uprising in Boulogne-sur-Mer led by Louis-Napoléon Bonaparte.

=== Second Republic ===
1. December 2, 1851: Louis-Napoléon Bonaparte, then president of France, dissolved the National Assembly and became the sole ruler of the country. In the following year, he restored the French Empire after a referendum.

=== Third Republic ===
1. February 23, 1899: Paul Déroulède attempted to overthrow the French Third Republic.

=== Fourth Republic ===
1. May 13, 1958: A partial coup d'état led by Pierre Lagaillarde, after which Charles de Gaulle was brought back to power and established the French Fifth Republic.

=== Fifth Republic ===
1. April 21–26, 1961: A failed coup d'état against President Charles de Gaulle intended to prevent a withdrawal from French Algeria
2. 2021: French security agencies shut down an alleged coup plan led by conspiracy theorist Rémy Daillet-Wiedemann.

== Gabon ==
1. February 17–18, 1964: A group of Gabonese officers overthrew President Léon M'ba.
2. January 7, 2019: Gabonese soldiers seized the national radio in an attempted coup against Ali Bongo.
3. August 30, 2023: Gabonese officers overthrew President Ali Bongo after his recent victory on the 2023 Gabonese general election.

== The Gambia ==
1. July 30 to August 4, 1981: attempted coup by Gambia Socialist Revolutionary party was foiled after Senegal intervened.
2. July 22, 1994: Yahya Jammeh overthrew Dawda Jawara.
3. March 22, 2006: attempted coup by colonel Ndure Cham against Yahya Jammeh.
4. 2009: coup plot against Yahya Jammeh foiled.
5. December 30, 2014: a failed coup against Yahya Jammeh, led by former head of the presidential guards Lamin Sanneh.
6. December 20, 2022: A few soldiers allegedly tried to overthrow the government of President Adama Barrow.

== Georgia ==
1. 1832: A plot by Georgian nobles to assassinate members of the Russian local administration of Georgia within the Russian Empire and restore political independence under the Bagrationi dynasty failed.
2. May 3, 1920: A Bolshevik coup against the Democratic Republic of Georgia failed.
3. December 22, 1991 to January 6, 1992: Warlords Tengiz Kitovani and Jaba Ioseliani overthrew President Zviad Gamsakhurdia.
4. 1998 Georgian attempted mutiny against President Eduard Shevardnadze.
5. 2009 Georgian mutiny against President Mikheil Saakashvili.

== Germany ==
=== Weimar Republic ===
1. January 1919: The Spartacus League attempted to overthrow the Social Democratic-dominated Council of People's Deputies, but was suppressed by the Reichswehr and the Freikorps.
2. March 1920: Various Freikorps led by Wolfgang Kapp and Walther von Lüttwitz attempted to overthrow the Weimar Republic. They seized control of Berlin but were suppressed with a general strike.
3. 1 October 1923: a failed attempt by the Black Reichswehr to overthrow the Weimar Republic.
4. November 8, 1923: A failed attempt by Nazi Party leader Adolf Hitler with Erich Ludendorff to seize control of Bavaria and overthrow Gustav Ritter von Kahr's state government in Munich was suppressed by the Reichswehr and the police.
5. 5 August 1931: the Boxheim Documents, plans for a Nazi seizure of power were drawn up by NSDAP member Werner Best. Plan abandoned after documents handed to Frankfurt police in November 1931.
6. 20 July 1932: President Paul von Hindenburg dissolved the government of the Free State of Prussia, handing control over it to Franz von Papen.

=== Third Reich ===
1. March 23, 1933: By the Enabling Act of 1933, the Chancellor Adolf Hitler assumed full powers in a self-coup.
2. 1938: Oster conspiracy: Plan by Hans Oster and other high-ranking members of the Wehrmacht to overthrow the Nazi dictatorship and crown Prince William of Prussia as Emperor of a revived Hohenzollern Dynasty if Germany went to war with Czechoslovakia over the Sudetenland was never carried out due to the Munich Agreement.
3. July 20, 1944: Members of the German resistance within the Wehrmacht led by Claus von Stauffenberg attempted to assassinate Adolf Hitler and seize control from the Nazi Party. They detonated a time bomb in a briefcase at the Wolf's Lair, Hitler's eastern headquarters in Rastenburg, East Prussia, but narrowly failed to kill Hitler.

=== Federal Republic ===
1. December 7, 2022: Police arrested 25 people for allegedly planning a coup. Part of the alleged plot included storming the Bundestag, the German parliament building.
2. November 5, 2024: Police arrested 8 people for planning a coup to take over the state of Saxony.

== Ghana ==
1. February 24, 1966: Joseph Arthur Ankrah overthrew Kwame Nkrumah.
2. April 17, 1967: Failed military coup.
3. January 13, 1972: Ignatius Kutu Acheampong overthrew Kofi Abrefa Busia.
4. July 5, 1978: Fred Akuffo overthrew Ignatius Kutu Acheampong.
5. June 4, 1979: Jerry John Rawlings overthrew Fred Akuffo.
6. December 31, 1981: Jerry John Rawlings overthrew Hilla Limann.
7. September 20, 2019: 3 arrested for taking part in a coup plot.

== Greece ==
=== 1st Hellenic Republic ===
1. 1831: A naval mutiny organized by Andreas Miaoulis against the government of Ioannis Kapodistrias led to the burning of the fleet on August 13 in the port of Poros.
2. 1831: After the assassination of Kapodistrias, a revolt against his brother Augustinos forced the Senate to take refuge in Astros.

=== Kingdom of Greece ===
1. September 3, 1843: King Otto was forced to grant Greece its first Constitution.
2. October 23, 1862: A coup led to the departure of King Otto and his queen in the first step towards the 1862 Greek head of state referendum, which resulted in Prince William of Denmark becoming George I, the King of the Hellenes.
3. August 15, 1909: The Goudi coup was staged against the government of Dimitrios Rallis, which brought Eleftherios Venizelos to the Greek political scene.
4. August 17, 1916: The National Defence coup d'état of Venizelos supporters in Thessaloniki led to the establishment of the Provisional Government of National Defence.
5. September 11, 1922: A coup led by Colonels Nikolaos Plastiras and Stylianos Gonatas and Commander Dimitrios Phokas, culminated in the abdication of King Constantine I.
6. October 11, 1923: Leonardopoulos–Gargalidis coup d'état attempt led by royalist officers.

=== Second Hellenic Republic ===
1. June 25, 1925: A coup d'état brought General Theodoros Pangalos to power.
2. August 22, 1926: General Georgios Kondylis overthrew General Pangalos.
3. March 6, 1933: Republican General Nikolaos Plastiras led an attempted coup.
4. March 1, 1935: General Plastiras and Venizelos attempted a coup d'état.
5. October 10, 1935: A coup, led by General Kondylis, signalled the end of the Second Hellenic Republic and led to the restoration of King George II to the throne, according to a referendum.

=== Kingdom of Greece ===
1. August 4, 1936: General Ioannis Metaxas established the 4th of August Regime.
2. July 28, 1938: A coup d'état attempt rebellion in Crete against the 4 August Regime.
3. May 31, 1951: Attempted coup d'état of a group of right-wing officers named Sacred Link of Greek Officers (IDEA).
4. April 21, 1967: A coup d'état, performed by a group of right-wing army officers led by Brigadier General Stylianos Pattakos and Colonels Georgios Papadopoulos and Nikolaos Makarezos, established the Regime of the Colonels.
5. December 13, 1967: Greek counter-coup attempt led by King Constantine II against the Regime of the Colonels. The failure of the counter-coup forced the King to leave Greece definitively.
6. May 23, 1973: The Velos mutiny against the Regime of the Colonels. The crew of the destroyer HNS Velos (D-16), under the command of Nikolaos Pappas, demanded political asylum in Italy, while the rest of the mutiny in Greek territory was suppressed.

=== Third Hellenic Republic ===
1. November 25, 1973: The aftermath of the Athens Polytechnic uprising. The coup resulted in the removal of Colonel Papadopoulos by hardliners loyal to General Dimitrios Ioannidis.
2. February 24, 1975: A coup attempt by certain officers to overthrow the government of Konstantinos Karamanlis.

== Grenada ==
1. March 13, 1979: Maurice Bishop overthrew Eric Gairy.
2. October 14, 1983: Bernard Coard overthrew Maurice Bishop.
3. October 19, 1983: Hudson Austin overthrew Bernard Coard.

== Guam ==
1. 1898: José Sisto overthrew Francisco Portusach Martínez as Governor of Guam after Martinez received the position following the American capture of Guam during the Spanish–American War.
2. 1898: Venancio Roberto and several islanders overthrew José Sisto, who was eventually reappointed to his old position by the U.S. federal government.

== Guatemala ==
1. March 24 to April 13, 1839: An anti-Morazán pronunciamiento by Rafael Carrera overthrew Carlos Salazar Castro and reinstated his predecessor, Mariano Rivera Paz.
2. December 5, 1921: José María Orellana overthrew Carlos Herrera.
3. December 16, 1930: Manuel María Orellana overthrew Baudilio Palma.
4. June 27, 1954: Carlos Castillo Armas overthrew Jacobo Árbenz Guzmán's Revolutionary Action Party government; assisted by the CIA in Operation PBSUCCESS.
5. October 1957: Guatemalan military ousts Luis Arturo González López in a coup, and installs a three-man junta headed by Óscar Mendoza Azurdia.
6. March 30–31, 1963: Enrique Peralta Azurdia overthrew Miguel Ydígoras Fuentes.
7. March 23, 1982: Efraín Ríos Montt overthrew Fernando Romeo Lucas García.
8. August 8, 1983: Guatemalan military ousts Efraín Ríos Montt. He was replaced by Oscar Mejia Victores.
9. May 11, 1988: A first coup attempt against Guatemalan president Vinicio Cerezo took place.
10. May 9, 1989: A second coup attempt against Guatemalan president Vinicio Cerezo took place.
11. May 25 to June 5, 1993: An attempted self-coup by President Jorge Serrano sparked a constitutional crisis.

== Guinea ==
1. April 3, 1984: Lansana Conté overthrew Louis Lansana Beavogui.
2. February 2–3, 1996: attempted coup by army dissidents to remove Lansana Conté.
3. December 24, 2008: Moussa Dadis Camara overthrew Aboubacar Somparé in what became known as the Christmas Coup.
4. September 5, 2021: Mamady Doumbouya overthrew Alpha Condé.

== Guinea-Bissau ==
1. November 14, 1980: João Bernardo Vieira overthrew Luís Cabral.
2. 1982: Failed attempt by army minister Paulo Correia to overthrow Vieira.
3. 1983: Failed attempt by Joao de Silva to overthrow Vieira.
4. 1984: Accused attempt by Prime Minister Victor Saúde Maria to overthrow Vieira.
5. 1985: Failed attempt by Vice-President Paulo Correia to overthrow Vieira
6. June 7, 1998: An attempted coup d'état against the government of President Vieira was led by Brigadier General Ansumane Mané
7. May 7, 1999: Ansumane Mané overthrew Vieira.
8. September 14, 2003: Veríssimo Correia Seabra overthrew Kumba Ialá.
9. 2008: Assassination of Vieira and army chief Tagme Na Waie
10. December 27, 2011: Attempted coup.
11. April 12, 2012: Mutinous troops overthrew the interim government.
12. February 1, 2022: An attempt to overthrow the government failed.
13. November 30, 2023: An attempted coup was led by army officers against President Umaro Sissoco Embaló.
14. October 31, 2025: a group of officers were arrested for allegedly planning a coup.
15. 26 November 2025: President Umaro Sissoco Embaló was arrested as part of a coup d'état carried out by the army chief of staff, who established the High Military Command for the Restoration of Order. The coup occurred days after the 2025 Guinea-Bissau general election held on 23 November, in which Embaló was running for reelection.

== Haiti ==
1. October 17, 1806: Henri Christophe and Alexandre Pétion overthrew Emperor Jacques I.
2. February 13, 1843: Charles Rivière-Hérard overthrew Jean-Pierre Boyer.
3. May 3, 1844: Philippe Guerrier overthrew Charles Rivière-Hérard.
4. 1840s: Rivierists' conspiracy, failed attempts by supporters of Charles Rivière-Hérard to restore him to power.
5. March 1, 1846: Jean-Baptiste Riché overthrew Jean-Louis Pierrot.
6. January 15, 1859: Fabre Geffrard overthrew Emperor Faustin I.
7. 1859–1867: In his eight-year presidency, Fabre Geffrard survived a series of coup attempts.
8. August 26, 1867: Sylvain Salnave overthrew Fabre Geffrard.
9. December 27, 1869: Jean-Nicolas Nissage Saget overthrew Sylvain Salnave.
10. April 16, 1876: Pierre Théoma Boisrond-Canal overthrew Michel Domingue.
11. March 14–17, 1878: Louis Tanis failed to overthrow the Boisrond-Canal government.
12. October 2–3, 1879: Lysius Salomon overthrew Joseph Lamothe.
13. October 19, 1888: François Denys Légitime overthrew Lysius Salomon.
14. October 17, 1889: Florvil Hyppolite overthrew François Denys Légitime.
15. December 21, 1902: Pierre Nord Alexis overthrew Pierre Théoma Boisrond-Canal.
16. December 2, 1908: François C. Antoine Simon overthrew Pierre Nord Alexis.
17. August 3, 1911: Cincinnatus Leconte overthrew Antoine Simon.
18. January 27, 1914: Oreste Zamor, along his brother Charles Zamor, overthrew Michel Oreste.
19. October 29, 1914: Joseph Davilmar Théodore overthrew Oreste Zamor.
20. February 25, 1915: Vilbrun Guillaume Sam overthrew Joseph Davilmar Théodore.
21. July 28, 1915: The Mulatto uprising overthrew and killed Vilbrun Guillaume Sam.
22. December 12, 1937: A failed plot to topple Sténio Vincent and install Démosthènes Pétrus Calixte as president.
23. January 11, 1946: The military junta overthrew Élie Lescot.
24. May 10, 1950: Paul Eugène Magloire led a coup against Dumarsais Estimé.
25. April 2, 1957: Léon Cantave overthrew Franck Sylvain.
26. June 14, 1957: Antonio Thrasybule Kébreau overthrew Daniel Fignolé.
27. July 28–29, 1958: A coup attempt led by Alix Pasquet against François Duvalier failed.
28. April 24, 1970: A coup attempt led by Octave Cayard against François Duvalier failed.
29. February 6, 1986: Jean-Claude Duvalier went into exile. He was replaced by the National Governing Council.
30. June 20, 1988: Henri Namphy overthrew Leslie Manigat.
31. September 17, 1988: Prosper Avril overthrew Henri Namphy.
32. April 1–2, 1989: A coup attempt against Prosper Avril failed.
33. January 6–7, 1991: A coup attempt against Ertha Pascal-Trouillot by Roger Lafontant failed.
34. September 30, 1991: Raoul Cédras overthrew Jean-Bertrand Aristide.
35. December 17, 2001: A coup attempt against Jean-Bertrand Aristide by ex-soldiers failed.
36. February 5–29, 2004: President Aristide was ousted during his second term.

== Hawaii ==
1. June 30, 1887: A group of militiamen and Reform Party politicians forced King Kalākaua to dissolve the Walter M. Gibson-led government and to sign a constitution that would strip the monarchy of most of its power and instead give power to an American-European-Native Hawaiian coalition government.
2. October 1887 to January 1888: Then-Princess Liliʻuokalani, Robert William Wilcox, Charles Burnett Wilson, and as many as 300 Royal Guard conspirators had plotted to overthrow Kalākaua and replace him with Lili'uokalani as Queen in the face of the 1887 Constitution. The plot was foiled around 48 hours before the rebellion would have begun. It was the first royalist coup attempt involving Wilcox.
3. July 30, 1889: An armed coup attempt led by Robert William Wilcox attempted to reinstate the 1864 Constitution, thus returning powers to King Kalākaua after the Hawaiian monarchy had been made a largely ceremonial one by the 1887 Constitution. The attempt failed and ended with 7-8 rebel deaths and 70 arrests (including Wilcox). It was Wilcox's second attempt (and the first to result in an active armed rebellion) to return power to the monarchy.
4. March 1892: A third coup plot by Robert William Wilcox was cancelled after Charles Wilson put the kingdom on high alert, and was officially foiled by a raid in May.
5. January 17, 1893: A coup d'état against Queen Liliʻuokalani on the island of Oahu by subjects of the Hawaiian Kingdom, United States citizens, and foreign residents residing in Honolulu. A majority of the insurgents were foreigners. They prevailed upon American minister John L. Stevens to call in the U.S. Marines to protect United States' interests, an action that effectively buttressed the rebellion. The revolutionaries established the Republic of Hawaii, but their ultimate goal was the annexation of the islands to the United States, which occurred in 1898.
6. January 6–9, 1895: Following the overthrow of the monarchy, Robert William Wilcox led a fourth and final coup attempt and second armed rebellion in an attempt to reinstate Queen Lili'uokalani. After three battles at Diamond Head, Mōʻiliʻili and Mānoa, the coup had officially failed, and Wilcox, Lili'uokalani and several other royalists were formally charged, although many were pardoned by President Sanford B. Dole.

== Honduras ==
1. May 10, 1827: José Justo Milla overthrew Dionisio de Herrera.
2. February 8, 1904: A self-coup was conducted by President Manuel Bonilla, supported by the mercenary leader Lee Christmas, leading to the closure of Honduras National Congress.
3. October 1940: A coup attempt against Tiburcio Carías Andino was led by General Salvador Cisneros and Liberal Party members.
4. November 21, 1943: A plot coordinated by anti-Carías dissidents, including military officers and members of the Liberal and National parties, failed to overthrow Tiburcio Carías Andino.
5. October 21, 1956: A military junta toppled President Julio Lozano Díaz.
6. July 12, 1959: A coup attempt against Ramón Villeda Morales was led by Armando Velásquez Cerrato.
7. October 3, 1963: Oswaldo López Arellano led his first military coup, ousting Ramón Villeda Morales.
8. December 4, 1972: Oswaldo López Arellano led his second military coup, ousting Ramón Ernesto Cruz.
9. April 22, 1975: Oswaldo López Arellano was overthrown by the Honduran military. He was replaced by Juan Alberto Melgar Castro.
10. August 7–8, 1978: Juan Alberto Melgar Castro was overthrown by the Honduran military. He was replaced by a military junta led by Policarpo Paz García and two other officers.
11. June 28, 2009: Manuel Zelaya was overthrown by the Honduran military.

== Hungary ==
1. 1670: An attempt by Hungarian and Croat nobles to overthrow the Habsburgs.
2. March 21–22, 1919: Establishment of the Hungarian Soviet Republic with Mihály Károlyi removed as head of state.
3. August 7, 1919: István Friedrich overthrew the MSZDP government of Gyula Peidl.
4. March 26, 1921: deposed king Charles arrived from abroad to re-assume the throne; the ruling regent Miklós Horthy convinced him to backtrack.
5. October 20, 1921: deposed king Charles again arrived in the country to re-assume the throne. Following skirmishes with some 20 soldiers killed, he resigned and withdrew abroad.
6. May 1, 1936: attempt by Hungarian Nazi Party leader Zoltán Böszörmény to seize power.
7. October 15–16, 1944: Ferenc Szálasi and the Arrow Cross Party, supported by the Wehrmacht and the Waffen-SS, overthrew Regent Miklós Horthy to prevent him from signing an armistice with the Allied Powers.
8. May 28–31, 1947: Mátyás Rákosi and the Hungarian Communist Party overthrew Ferenc Nagy's government by arresting members of the National Assembly.
9. November 4, 1956: the Soviet Army invaded Hungary and overthrew Imre Nagy, replacing him with János Kádár.

== Iceland ==
1. June 25, 1809: The crew of a British trade vessel arrest and overthrow the governor of Iceland after being banned from conducting trade on the island. The Danish adventurer Jørgen Jørgensen declared himself "Protector and Supreme commander of Iceland", stating his intentions of creating an independent republic ruled by Iceland's Althing. The coup was overturned two months later by the commander of a British warship.

== India ==
=== Maurya Empire ===
1. 185 BC: Pushyamitra Shunga overthrew and killed Emperor Brihadratha Maurya. The fallen Mauryan dynasty was replaced by the Shunga dynasty.

=== Shunga Empire ===
1. 73 BC: Vasudeva Kanva overthrew and killed Emperor Devabhuti. The fallen Shunga dynasty was replaced by the Kanva dynasty.

=== Delhi Sultanate ===
1. June 13, 1290: Jalal-ud-Din Khalji overthrew the Mamluks in favor of the Khaljis.
2. July 19, 1296: Jalal-ud-Din Khalji was deposed and killed by assassins sent by his nephew Alauddin Khalji, who usurps the throne in opposition to the rightful heir Ruknuddin Ibrahim.
3. July 9, 1320: A group of conspirators, including Khusrau Khan, committed the regicide of Sultan Mubarak Shah I and deposed the Khaljis.

=== Mughal Empire ===
1. 1626: A coup attempt led by Mahabat Khan against Emperor Jahangir fails.
2. February 28, 1719: The Sayyid brothers overthrew and killed Emperor Farrukhsiyar. He was replaced by Rafi ud-Darajat.

== Indonesia ==
1. July 3, 1946: Prime Minister Sutan Sjahrir was kidnapped by factions within the military opposing the Republic's negotiations with the Dutch during the Indonesian National Revolution. It ended with the release of Sjahrir and a re-structure of both the Republican government and the army.
2. March 3, 1947: An attempted coup against the Indonesian republican administration in West Sumatra during the Indonesian National Revolution by Islamic militias. The coup failed and its leaders were arrested
3. January 22–23, 1950: A coup d'état by Raymond Westerling's Legion of the Just Ruler (APRA) to capture Bandung and Jakarta, with the aim to overthrow Sukarno's unitary Republic of Indonesia. Westerling's forces succeeded in capturing Bandung in the early hours of January 23, 1950.
4. July 5, 1959: The Presidential Decree of 5 July 1959 was issued by President Sukarno in the face of the inability of the Constitutional Assembly of Indonesia to achieve the two-thirds majority to reimpose the 1945 Constitution. Army chief of staff Abdul Haris Nasution concluded that this would be the only way to bring about the reintroduction of a constitution that paved the way for the military to play a greater role in the running of the state, ushering in the period known as the "guided democracy" (1959–1966).
5. September 30, 1965: A failed coup attempt was blamed on the Communist Party of Indonesia.
6. March 11, 1966: General Suharto seized power and slowly overthrew President Sukarno until 1967 (see Transition to the New Order).
7. May 22, 1998: In the aftermath of the fall of Suharto, his son-in-law, Prabowo Subianto, amassed troop movements in Jakarta after issuing demands against then President Habibie. The attempt failed and Prabowo imposed a self-exile to Jordan.

== Iran ==
=== Achaemenid Empire ===
1. 552 BC: Persian Revolt: Cyrus the Great led the Persis to declare independence from and then conquer the Median Empire, establishing the Achaemenid Empire.
2. 522 BC: Darius I revolted against Bardiya.
3. 338 BC: Artaxerxes III and his family were assassinated by Bagoas. Artaxerxes IV became the new King of Kings.
4. 336 BC: Bagoas killed Artaxerxes IV by poison. Darius III ascended to the throne.

=== Sassanid Empire ===
1. 309: The nobles assassinated Adur Narseh. His infant brother, Shapur II, became the new King of Kings.
2. 420: The nobles assassinated and deposed Yazdegerd I.
3. 488: Sukhra deposed Balash in favor of the shah's nephew, Kavad I.
4. 496: The nobles deposed Kavad I and installed Jamasp as the new shah of shahs of Iran and Aniran.
5. 590: Coup d'état carried out by Vistahm and Vinduyih against Hormizd IV, in favor of his son, Khosrow II.
6. 590: General Bahram Chobin revolted against the Sassanian government and captured Ctesiphon. Khosrow II fled to Constantinople.
7. 628: Kavad II overthrew his father, Khosrow II.
8. April 27, 629: King Ardashir III was executed in the Siege of Ctesiphon by the military commander Shahrbaraz.
9. 631: Rostam Farrokhzad captured Ctesiphon, killed Azarmidokht, and installed Boran as the queen of queens of Iran and Aniran.

=== Safavid Empire ===
1. 1732: Nader Shah overthrew Tahmasp II.
2. 1733: Governor of the Kuhgiluyeh's rebelled against the Safavid Empire.
3. 1736: Abbas III, the nominal ruler of Iran, was deposed by Nader Shah. This marked the official end of the Safavid dynasty of Iran.

=== Afsharid dynasty ===
1. 1744: Beylerbey of Fars province's rebelled against Nader Shah.
2. 1747: Nader Shah was assassinated in support of Adel Shah.
3. 1748: Ebrahim Afshar defeated and blinded Adel Shah, declaring himself Shah in opposition to Shakrokh Shah.
4. 1748: Ebrahim Afshar was assassinated on Shahrukh Afshar's orders.

=== Qajar Dynasty ===
1. 1798: Agha Mohammad Khan Qajar was assassinated in support of Sadiq Khan Shaqaqi.
2. 1908: The Majlis were bombarded by Vladimir Liakhov in support of Mohammad Ali Shah Qajar.

=== Pahlavi Iran ===
1. 1921: Coup d'état was led by Reza Khan Mirpanj (later Reza Shah Pahlavi) and Zia ol Din Tabatabaee during the reign of Ahmad Shah Qajar.
2. 1953: Coup d'état was carried out against Prime Minister Mohammed Mossadegh in support of Mohammad Reza Pahlavi; sponsored by the CIA and MI6.

=== Islamic Republic of Iran ===
1. 1980: A coup d'état by a group of Iranian Armed Forces officers against the newly established Islamic regime failed.

== Iraq ==
1. October 20, 1936: Bakr Sidqi overthrew Yasin al-Hashimi.
2. April 1, 1941: Rashid Ali al-Gaylani overthrew 'Abd al-Ilah with the support of the Axis Powers, leading to the Anglo-Iraqi War.
3. July 14, 1958: Abdul-Karim Qassim overthrew King Faisal II, ending the Hashemite monarchy in Iraq.
4. March 8, 1959: Abd al-Wahab al-Shawaf attempted to overthrow premier Abdul-Karim Qassim, with support from the United Arab Republic.
5. February 8, 1963: Abdul Salam Arif and Ahmed Hassan al-Bakr overthrew Abdul-Karim Qassim.
6. July 3, 1963: failed uprising by the Iraqi Communist Party and elements of the Iraqi Army to overthrow the government.
7. November 11, 1963: Pro-Nasserist officers of the Iraqi Armed Forces ousted the Ba'ath Party from government.
8. June 29, 1966: Arif Abd ar-Razzaq attempted to overthrow Abdul Rahman Arif.
9. July 17, 1968: Ahmed Hassan al-Bakr overthrew Abdul Rahman Arif, establishing the Ba'athist dictatorship.
10. 6 January 1990: attempt to overthrow Saddam Hussein.
11. June 1996: A failed US-backed coup to overthrow Saddam Hussein.

== Italy ==
1. October 28–31, 1922: Fascist coup d'état in which Benito Mussolini and his National Fascist Party's Blackshirt militias attempted to overthrow Prime Minister Luigi Facta with an insurrection in Rome; it was successful when King Victor Emmanuel III refused to allow Facta to declare a state of martial law.
2. July 24, 1943: Coup to remove Fascist dictator Benito Mussolini as Prime Minister of the Kingdom of Italy and replace him with Marshal Pietro Badoglio. Count Dino Grandi and the Grand Council of Fascism voted overwhelmingly to ask King Victor Emmanuel III to resume his full constitutional powers and, on the following day, the king summoned Mussolini to his palace and dismissed him
3. 1964: Alleged coup attempted by military groups.
4. December 7–8, 1970: Coup attempt by neo-fascist groups led by Junio Valerio Borghese, a former Italian Royal Navy commander of World War II, failed after the CIA and NATO refused to support it.
5. 1974: A planned coup by former Partisan Edgardo Sogno.

== Ivory Coast ==
1. December 24, 1999: Robert Guéï overthrew Henri Konan Bédie.
2. 7–8 January 2001: attempted military coup against Laurent Gbagbo.
3. September 19, 2002: failed coup to remove Laurent Gbagbo from power. the attempt resulted in civil war.
4. June 12, 2012: attempt to overthrow Alassane Ouattara and reinstate Laurent Gbagbo as Ivorian President.

== Japan ==
1. Lunar August, 456 AD: Historical texts state that Mayuwa no Ōkimi (ja:眉輪王) assassinated reigning Ōkimi Emperor Ankō (安康天皇) over the alleged killing of his father. According to the Nihon Shoki, the influential Ōomi Katsuragi no Tsubura was also killed by arson, whereas the Kojiki says he killed himself. This potentially could have been a coup attempt because the two most senior statesmen were targeted and eliminated, nevertheless there is no indication that the plotter wanted to assume the throne, instead Emperor Yuryaku ascended three months later.
2. 479 AD: An attempt by Prince Hoshikawa to gain the throne failed.
3. 498 AD: Ōomi Heguri no Matori takes over Yamato Japan's government in a briefly successful coup upon the death of Emperor Ninken, before being defeated and killed by Otomo no Kanamura, who raised Emperor Buretsu to the throne.

Over a century later, in 632 A.D. the title Ōkimi was posthumously reassigned to the term Tenno. This term is currently equated with Emperor.

1. 645 AD: Soga no Iruka was assassinated in a successful coup, with one of the coup plotters becoming the next Emperor (Taika Reform).
2. 764 AD: A coup, led by Fujiwara no Nakamaro, to overthrow Retired Empress Kōken and the monk Dōkyō failed.
3. 1156: Emperor Go-Shirakawa defeated his rival Jōkō Emperor Sutoku.
4. 1160: The Minamoto clan took up arms against the Taira clan. The Taira clan emerged victorious.
5. 1184: Amidst the Genpei War, Kiso Yoshinaka ambushed Hōjūjidono, confining Emperor Go-Toba and Cloistered Emperor Go-Shirakawa.
6. 1551: Sue Takafusa (later known as Sue Harukata) launched a rebellion against Ōuchi Yoshitaka, hegemon daimyō of western Japan, leading the latter to commit seppuku.
7. 1864–65: The Mito Rebellion of Takeda Kōunsai was a rebellion in the Mito Domain in support of the sonnō jōi policy.
8. 1866–68: A Samurai uprising led to the overthrow of the Tokugawa shogunate and the establishment of a "modern" parliamentary, Western-style system under the Meiji era.
9. March 1931: An aborted coup by the Sakurakai to overthrow Prime Minister Hamaguchi Osachi and form a new government was led by Army Minister Kazushige Ugaki.
10. October 21, 1931: An aborted coup by the Sakurakai.
11. May 15, 1932: A failed coup by members of the Imperial Japanese Navy resulted in the assassination of Prime Minister Inukai Tsuyoshi.
12. November 1934: A coup by members of the Imperial Japanese Army failed to achieve a Shōwa Restoration.
13. February 26, 1936: A failed coup was led by the Imperial Way Faction in the Imperial Japanese Army against Prime Minister Keisuke Okada's government.
14. August 14–15, 1945: A coup against Emperor Hirohito by members of the Ministry of the Army and the Imperial Guard opposed to surrendering to the Allied Powers at the end of World War II failed after they were unable to convince the Imperial Japanese Army General Staff and the Eastern District Army to join.
15. August 24, 1945: A failed coup by dissidents opposed to surrender was led by Isao Okazaki in Matsue.
16. July 1952: Coup plot by Takushiro Hattori and elements of the National Safety Agency to assassinate Prime Minister Shigeru Yoshida and replace him with Ichirō Hatoyama. Coup aborted.
17. December 12, 1961: A coup attempt by retired right wing members of the Imperial Japanese Army was aborted through a police raid.
18. November 25, 1970: A coup by author Yukio Mishima, who attempted to convince the Japan Self-Defense Forces to overturn the 1947 Constitution, was aborted.

== Jordan ==
1. April 13, 1957: confrontation between royalists and Arab Nationalist units in the Jordanian Army, allegedly part of a coup attempt.
2. 1958: Attempted coup against King Hussein by Pan-Arabist officers.
3. 1970: A Palestine Liberation Organization coup attempt against King Hussein failed. King Hussein retaliated with Black September conflict, driving the PLO to Lebanon.
4. 2021: A coup attempt by Prince Hamzah bin Hussein to overthrow his half-brother, King Abdullah II, failed.

== Kenya ==
1. August 1, 1982: An attempted coup was led by Kenya Air Force personnel to overthrow the Daniel arap Moi government. They captured Eastleigh Air Base and parts of Nairobi before collapsing.

== Korea, North ==
1. 1956: attempt to remove Kim Il-Sung by pro-Chinese and pro-Soviet factions of the Korean Workers Party.
2. ca. 1967: Attempt by faction of former anti-Japanese guerrillas was led by Pak Kum-chol to overthrow Kim Il-sung to end the cult of personality, and introduce economic reforms. This led to a crackdown and purges in the Korean Workers' Party, as well as the implementation of the Ten Principles for the Establishment of a Monolithic Ideological System.
3. April 25, 1992: Attempt by a group of North Korean students planned to use a tank loaded with a live shell during a military parade to fire it on the tribune as the vehicle passed the reviewing stand to kill North Korean leader Kim Il Sung and his son Kim Jong Il, as well as members of the country's top leadership.

== Korea, South ==
1. May 16, 1961: Park Chung Hee overthrew the Second Republic of Korea led by Yun Po-sun and replaced it with the Supreme Council for National Reconstruction.
2. October 17, 1972: President Park Chung Hee led a coup to restore total presidential authority after his party underperformed in elections, creating the Fourth Republic of Korea.
3. December 12, 1979: Major General Chun Doo-hwan of the Defense Security Command arrested Republic of Korea Army Chief of Staff Jeong Seung-hwa and his allies, creating the Fifth Republic of Korea.
4. May 17, 1980: General Chun Doo-Hwan extended martial law, banned political activities, and forced universities to close.
5. December 3, 2024: President Yoon Suk Yeol enacts martial law, attempting self-coup to suppress all political activities including that of the National Assembly along with a ban on strike action and the media. The attempt was unsuccessful with the National Assembly convening despite it and voting unanimously to lift the declaration.

== Kuwait ==
1. May 17, 1896: Mubarak Al-Sabah killed Sheikh Muhammad Al-Sabah and seized the throne.
2. February 15, 2024: Emir Mishal Al-Ahmad Al-Jaber Al-Sabah suspended the National Assembly.
3. May 10, 2024: Following the opposition gaining a majority in the 2024 Kuwaiti general election, Emir Mishal dissolved the National Assembly for the second time and partially suspended the Constitution.

== Kyrgyzstan ==
1. May 6, 2023: Kyrgyz authorities arrested 30 people on charges of plotting a coup against President Sadyr Japarov.
2. July 2024: Kyrgyz intelligence services foiled a planned coup.
3. November 13, 2024: Seven people arrested on charges of organising a coup.
4. May 12, 2026: Former security chief Kamchybek Tashiev and seven others are arrested on charges of planning a coup.

== Laos ==
1. December 25, 1959: A coup by Captain Kong Le established General Phoumi Nosavan's leadership.
2. August 9, 1960: Captain Kong Le overthrew General Phoumi.
3. December 16, 1960: General Phoumi won the counter-coup in the Battle of Vientiane.
4. April 18, 1964: Police General Siho Lamphouthacoul seized power for five days.
5. August 4, 1964: General Phoumi's attempted coup failed.
6. January 31, 1965: Colonel Bounleut Saycocie and General Phoumi's independent attempts both failed.
7. 1966: General Thao Ma's coup by air strike failed.
8. 1973: A second attempt by General Thao Ma's coup via air strike failed.
9. 2007: General Vang Pao's coup failed.

== Latvia ==
1. April 16, 1919: A coup in Liepaja against the Latvian Provisional Government by the Germans.
2. May 15, 1934: Kārlis Ulmanis dissolved the Saeima (Latvia's parliament) and established a dictatorship.

== Lebanon ==
1. December 31, 1961: A failed coup attempt was conducted by the Syrian Socialist Nationalist Party.
2. March 11, 1976: A failed coup attempt against president Suleiman Frangieh was led by Abdel Aziz al-Ahdab.

== Lesotho ==
1. January 30, 1970: A self-coup was conducted by Prime Minister Leabua Jonathan.
2. January 20, 1986: Justin Lekhanya overthrew Leabua Jonathan.
3. November 12, 1990: Justin Lekhanya overthrew King Moshoeshoe II of Lesotho.
4. April 30, 1991: Elias Phisoana Ramaema overthrew Justin Lekhanya.
5. August 17, 1994: self-coup by King Letsie III.
6. August 30, 2014: A failed coup attempt.

== Liberia ==
1. October 26, 1871: President Edward James Roye was deposed by the people of Monrovia.
2. April 12, 1980: Master Sergeant Samuel Doe overthrew President William Tolbert
3. 1985: attempted coup by General Thomas Quiwonkpa against Samuel Doe.
4. September 9, 1990: Prince Johnson overthrew President Samuel Doe.
5. September 15, 1994: attempted coup by dissident faction within the Liberian military.

== Libya ==
1. September 1, 1969: Muammar Gaddafi and the Free Officers Movement overthrow King Idris of Libya. The coup resulted in the abolition of the Senussi monarchy and the establishment of a republic under the rule of the Revolutionary Command Council (RCC).
2. December 7, 1969: An attempted coup by defense minister Moussa Ahmed and interior minister Adam al-Hawaz failed to overthrow Muammar Gaddafi.
3. 1970: Counter-coup plots involving Abdullah al-Abid al-Senussi and Ahmed al-Senussi, two distant cousins of King Idris, were foiled by Gaddafi's RCC regime.
4. August 13, 1975: An attempted coup by Bashir Saghir Hawadi and Umar Muhayshi failed to oust Muammar Gaddafi.
5. May 8, 1984: An attempted coup launched by the National Front for the Salvation of Libya failed to overthrow the Gaddafi regime.
6. October 22, 1993: A failed coup against Muammar Gaddafi was led by Warfalla officers.
7. April 17, 2013: A first coup attempt against Libyan prime minister Ali Zeidan was led by Gaddafi loyalists.
8. October 10, 2013: A second coup attempt against prime minister Ali Zeidan was led by Abdel-Moneim al-Hour.
9. April and October 2014: Coup against Prime Minister Ali Zeidan (the first coup) and against Prime Minister Abdullah al-Thani (the second coup) by Major General Khalifa Haftar failed.
10. October 14, 2016: A failed coup against Prime Minister Fayez al-Sarraj was led by former prime minister Khalifa al-Ghawil.

== Liechtenstein ==
1. November 7, 1918: Wilhelm Beck, Fritz Walser, and Martin Ritter overthrew the government of Leopold Freiherr von Imhof and installed the Provisional Executive Committee.
2. March 24, 1939: Liechtenstein Nazi Movement launched an unsuccessful coup to provoke a possible annexation by Germany.

== Lithuania ==
There are estimated to be over 10 unsuccessful coups during the period of 1919–1940 in Lithuania.

1. August to September 1919: A failed attempt by Polish Chief of State Józef Piłsudski to overthrow the existing Lithuanian government of Prime Minister Mykolas Sleževičius, and install a pro-Polish cabinet that would agree to a union with Poland.
2. December 17, 1926: President Kazys Grinius was overthrown and Antanas Smetona became the head of state.
3. September 9, 1927: An attempt to overthrow the Lithuanian Nationalist Union and to re-establish the previous government failed.
4. June 6–7, 1934: A failed coup d'état was led by the fascist Iron Wolf.

== Luxembourg ==
1. November 1918 to January 1919: A series of riots and mutinies failed to overthrow the Luxembourg government due to lack of support.

== Madagascar ==
=== Kingdom of Madagascar (Imerina) ===
1. May 12, 1863: Prime Minister Rainivoninahitriniony successfully deposed king Radama II, who was (supposedly) killed and succeeded by his wife, Queen Rasoherina.
2. March 27, 1868: An attempted coup to reinstate Rainivoninahitriniony as prime minister failed.

=== Republic of Madagascar ===
1. October 11, 1972: Gabriel Ramanantsoa overthrew Philibert Tsiranana.
2. February 5, 1975: Richard Ratsimandrava overthrew Gabriel Ramanantsoa.
3. November 18, 2006: An alleged coup attempt took place when retired army General Andrianafidisoa, also known as Fidy (and a previous Director General of OMNIS), declared military rule.
4. March 17, 2009: Andry Rajoelina overthrew Marc Ravalomanana.
5. October 12–14, 2025: CAPSAT, a unit of the Madagascar Armed Forces, joined anti-government protesters before announcing control of the entire military, resulting in Andry Rajoelina fleeing the country and being overthrown.

== Malaysia ==
1. 2020–2022 Malaysian political crisis

== Maldives ==
1. 1980: Former president Ibrahim Nasir, along with his brother in law Ahmed Naseem, the health minister Mohammed Mustafa Hussain and a leading businessman Khua Mohammed Yusuf, allegedly hired a group of nine former members of Britain's elite Special Air Service commandos and sent them to assassinate President Maumoon Abdul Gayoom. The mercenaries used Sri Lanka as their base and carried out several reconnaissance trips. They were also provided arms to carry out their mission and promised an inducement of $60,000 each. The attempt was called off by the SAS members because they started having second thoughts.
2. 1988: Abdullah Luthufi, assisted by PLOTE, staged a coup to overthrow the government of Maumoon Abdul Gayoom. They seized control of the capital Malé until the Indian Navy retook the city from the rebels.

== Mali ==
1. November 19, 1968: Moussa Traoré overthrew Modibo Keïta.
2. March 26, 1991: Amadou Toumani Touré overthrew Moussa Traoré.
3. March 22, 2012: The military overthrew Amadou Toumani Touré.
4. April 30 to May 1, 2012: attempted counter coup against Amadou Toumani Tourre
5. August 18, 2020: The military overthrew Ibrahim Boubacar Keïta.
6. 2021: The military overthrew Bah N'daw.
7. May 17, 2022: Malian Military Junta claimed to have stopped a coup attempt led by an "unnamed NATO country."
8. August 11, 2025: dozens of soldiers, including General Abass Dembélé and General Nema Sagara, as well as a French national, were arrested on charges of planning to overthrow the Malian military Junta.

== Mauritania ==
1. July 10, 1978: Mustafa Ould Salek overthrew Moktar Ould Daddah.
2. April 6, 1979: Ahmed Ould Bouceif and Mohamed Khouna Ould Haidalla overthrew Mustafa Ould Salek.
3. January 4, 1980: Mohamed Khouna Ould Haidalla overthrew Mohamed Mahmoud Ould Louly.
4. 16 March 1981: attempt by Alliance For a Democratic Mauritania to overthrow Mohamed Khouna Ould Haidalla.
5. December 12, 1984: Maaouya Ould Sid'Ahmed Taya overthrew Mohamed Khouna Ould Haidalla.
6. 8–9 June 2003: coup attempt by Saleh Ould Hanenna against Maaouya Ould Sid'Ahmed Taya.
7. August 3, 2005: Ely Ould Mohamed Vall overthrew Maaouya Ould Sid'Ahmed Taya.
8. August 6, 2008: Mohamed Ould Abdel Aziz overthrew Sidi Ould Cheikh Abdallahi.

== Mexico ==
=== Prior to independence ===
1. 1799: Criollo civil servants plotted to overthrow the Spanish Empire and establish an independent republic; regarded as a precursor to the War of Mexican Independence.
2. 1808: Gabriel J. de Yermo overthrew the viceroy of New Spain, José de Iturrigaray.

=== Mexican Empire ===
1. May 18, 1822: Regent Agustín de Iturbide performed a self-coup with army support, proclaiming himself emperor. The Congress, upon which this proclamation was imposed, was dissolved after a few months.
2. 1823: Antonio López de Santa Anna launched a republican rebellion, culminating in the abdication of Agustín I and the end of the First Mexican Empire.

=== Mexican Republic ===
1. December 1827: A coup attempt by Vice President Nicolás Bravo against Guadalupe Victoria failed.
2. 1828: Vicente Guerrero led a successful coup against President-elect Manuel Gómez Pedraza.
3. December 1829: Vice President Anastasio Bustamante overthrew Vicente Guerrero.
4. 1832: Santa Anna's led his first coup against Anastasio Bustamante.
5. 1834: Antonio López de Santa Anna led a self-coup by dissolving the Congress. He removed his vice president, Valentín Gómez Farías.
6. 1841: Santa Anna's led his second coup against Anastasio Bustamante.
7. December 6, 1844: Congressional forces overthrew Valentín Canalizo and Antonio López de Santa Anna, handing the presidency over to José Joaquín de Herrera.
8. December 30, 1845: Mariano Paredes overthrew José Joaquín de Herrera.
9. August 4, 1846: José Mariano Salas overthrew Vice President Nicolás Bravo and the absent President Mariano Paredes.
10. March 1847: Antonio López de Santa Anna overthrew Valentín Gómez Farías.
11. 1852–1853: Santanistas launched a rebellion that overthrew Mariano Arista.
12. 1854–1855: Juan Álvarez overthrew Antonio López de Santa Anna.
13. December 17, 1857: Ignacio Comonfort conducts a self-coup by nullifying the 1857 Constitution.
14. October 19, 1871: A coup attempt against Benito Juárez fails.
15. 1876: Porfirio Díaz overthrew Sebastián Lerdo de Tejada.

=== Revolutionary period ===
1. 1911: Francisco I. Madero led a coup against Porfirio Díaz (and Francisco León de la Barra).
2. February 19, 1913: Victoriano Huerta overthrew Francisco I. Madero.
3. May 21, 1920: Sonoran generals Álvaro Obregón, Plutarco Elías Calles, and Adolfo de la Huerta launched a rebellion that culminated in the overthrow and death of Venustiano Carranza.
4. 1929: A coup attempt by José Gonzalo Escobar against Emilio Portes Gil and Plutarco Elías Calles failed.
5. 1938: A coup attempt by Saturnino Cedillo against Lázaro Cárdenas failed.
6. 1940: Juan Andreu Almazán attempted a coup to prevent the inauguration of president-elect Manuel Ávila Camacho.

== Moldova ==
1. February 13, 2023: allegations of a Russia-backed coup attempt.

== Montenegro ==
1. October 16, 2016: There was an attempted coup by opposition and Russian agents against the government of Milo Đukanović on the day of the 2016 Montenegrin parliamentary election.

== Morocco ==
1. 1907–1908: Sultan Abdelaziz was deposed by his brother Abd al-Hafid.
2. July 10, 1971: A coup attempt by M'hamed Ababou and Mohamed Medbouh against Hassan II of Morocco failed.
3. August 16, 1972: A coup attempt by Mohamed Oufkir against Hassan II of Morocco failed.
4. 1973: Coup attempt by the National Union of Popular Forces.

== Myanmar ==
1. 1837: King Bagyidaw was deposed by a coup led by his brother Tharrawaddy Min.
2. 1853: King Pagan Min was deposed by a coup led by his brother Mindon Min.
3. September 1958: A split within the AFPFL threatened to provoke a coup from field officers. On September 26, U Nu invited the military to form a caretaker government. U Nu resigned on October 28 and Ne Win's Caretaker Government swore in on October 29.
4. March 1, 1962: Ne Win overthrew U Nu, replacing the parliamentary rule with the Revolutionary Council.
5. September 18, 1988: Saw Maung overthrew Maung Maung Kha, dissolving and replacing the socialist regime with the State Law and Order Restoration Council.
6. February 1, 2021: Min Aung Hlaing overthrew Aung San Suu Kyi and a state of emergency was declared by acting president Myint Swe The State Administration Council was founded on February 2.

== Nepal ==
1. 1559: Drabya Shah killed the Khadka, Raja by his own hand with a sword and began the rule of his dynasty under Shahas.
2. October 31, 1846: A political massacre organized by Jung Bahadur Rana reduced the Shah Monarch to a figurehead and made the office of prime minister and other powers hereditary to Ranas.
3. 1882: Chautariya Colonel Ambar Bikram Shah and his Gorkhali aide attempted to assassinate Ranodip Singh Kunwar. They failed and were killed in Teku by the Ranas.
4. November 2, 1885: Ranodip Singh Kunwar was assassinated by Bir Shumsher Jung Bahadur Rana.
5. June 27, 1901: Chandra Shumsher Jung Bahadur Rana overthrew Dev Shumsher Jung Bahadur Rana.
6. December 15, 1960: King Mahendra dismissed parliament, arrested Prime Minister BP Koirala, and outlawed political parties.
7. February 1, 2005: King Gyanendra dismissed parliament and declared a state of emergency, assuming direct rule.

== Netherlands ==
=== Habsburg Netherlands ===
1. July 24, 1577: The capture of the Namur citadel by Don Juan of Austria has been considered a coup against the States-General of the Netherlands.
2. October 28, 1577: A coup was led by radical Calvinists Jan van Hembyse and François van Ryhove against the stadtholder of Flanders, Philippe III de Croÿ (Duke of Aarschot). They founded the Calvinist Republic of Ghent.
3. September 7, 1578: A coup d'état was led by Johann VI, Count of Nassau-Dillenburg against the Hof van Gelre en Zutphen.
4. January 23, 1579: A coup d'état was led by Johann VI, Count of Nassau-Dillenburg and four Gueldrian noblemen against the Hof van Gelre en Zutphen.

=== Dutch Republic ===
1. August 1618: Coup d'état was led by Maurice, Prince of Orange.
2. July–August 1650: Attack on Amsterdam and imprisonment of rival regent was led by William II, Prince of Orange.
3. August 20, 1672: An Orangist coup was carried out against the Loevestein government.

=== Batavian Republic ===
1. January 22, 1798: Uitvoerend Bewind led a coup against the National Assembly of the Batavian Republic.
2. June 12, 1798: Herman Willem Daendels led a coup against Pieter Vreede.
3. September 19, 1801: Napoleon Bonaparte led a coup against Uitvoerend Bewind.

=== Kingdom of the Netherlands ===
1. November 27, 1856: William III of the Netherlands, the reigning Grand Duke of Luxembourg, undertook a reactionary revision of the Luxembourg constitution.
2. November 9–14, 1918: A failed coup attempt was led by Troelstra against the Dutch government.
3. 1947: Former Prime Minister Pieter Sjoerds Gerbrandy organised a coup plot to prevent the implementation of the Linggadjati Agreement. the coup plot collapsed after intelligence services were alerted.

== Nicaragua ==
1. August 4, 1851: General Commander José Trinidad Muñoz led a coup against Supreme Director Laureano Pineda.
2. 1856: A coup was led by William Walker.
3. 1925–1926: Emiliano Chamorro Vargas led a successful coup against Carlos José Solórzano, sometimes known as El Lomazo. This coup led to the Constitutionalist War.
4. June 6, 1936: Anastasio Somoza Garcia orchestrated a first coup, in which he ousted his uncle, President Juan Bautista Sacasa.
5. May 26, 1947: Anastasio Somoza García orchestrated a second coup, in which he overthrew Leonardo Argüello Barreto.

== Niger ==
1. April 15, 1974: Seyni Kountché overthrew Hamani Diori.
2. January 27, 1996: Ibrahim Baré Maïnassara overthrew Mahamane Ousmane.
3. April 9, 1999: Daouda Malam Wanké overthrew Ibrahim Baré Maïnassara.
4. February 18, 2010: Salou Djibo overthrew Mamadou Tandja.
5. July 12–13, 2011: A coup attempt against Mahamadou Issoufou failed.
6. March 31, 2021: An attempt by Captain Sani Saley Gourouza to overthrow Mahamadou Issoufou failed.
7. July 26, 2023: Mohamed Bazoum is detained and a military junta installed.
8. August 29, 2026: A coup attempt by a dissident faction of the Niger Armed Forces to overthrow Abdourahamane Tiani failed.

== Nigeria ==
1. January 15–16, 1966: Chukwuma Nzeogwu overthrew Abubakar Tafawa Balewa.
2. July 29, 1966: Yakubu Gowon overthrew Johnson Aguiyi-Ironsi.
3. July 29, 1975: Murtala Muhammed overthrew Yakubu Gowon.
4. February 13, 1976: Bukar Suwa Dimka led a failed coup that resulted in the death of the head of state Murtala Muhammed.
5. 1981/1982: Between March 1981 and early 1982, businessman Alhaji Zanna B. U. Mandara tried to recruit Army personnel particularly of the Brigade of Guards in an attempt to overthrow the democratic government of Shehu Shagari.
6. December 31, 1983: Muhammadu Buhari overthrew Shehu Shagari.
7. August 27, 1985: Ibrahim Babangida overthrew Muhammadu Buhari.
8. December 1985: Major-General Mamman Jiya Vatsa and others arrested over conspiracy to overthrow Ibrahim Babangida.
9. 1987: Sometime in 1987, Major Akinloye Akinyemi was arrested and tried by a tribunal headed by Brigadier O. D. Diya for attempted coup plotting.
10. April 22, 1990: Gideon Orkar failed to topple president Ibrahim Babangida.
11. November 17, 1993: Sani Abacha overthrew Ernest Shonekan.
12. March 1995: Serving Army officers including Colonel R. Bello-Fadile and Brigadier L. Gwadabe were arrested alongside retired Army officers including Olusegun Obasanjo and Shehu Musa Yar'Adua for conspiracy to overthrow Sani Abacha. The plot was said to involve civilians such as Beko Ransome-Kuti, Chris Anyanwu and Kunle Ajibade.
13. December 1997: Oladipo Diya, Musa Bamaiyi, Abdulkareem Adisa and others were arrested on charges of treason, conspiracy to commit treason and concealment of the fact of treason for a plot to overthrow Sani Abacha.
14. April 2004: Hamza Al-Mustapha and others arrested over conspiracy to overthrow the government of Olusegun Obasanjo.
15. April 13, 2024: Yoruba separatists attempt a coup in the Oyo State.
16. October 2025: sixteen army officers arrested on charges of organising a coup.

== Norway ==
1. 1537: King Christian III overthrew Regent Olav Engelbrektsson and the Rigsraad, leading to the Norwegian Reformation, and forcibly implemented a hereditary monarchy.
2. April 9, 1940: Vidkun Quisling announced a fascist government by radio broadcast in an attempt to overthrow the legally elected Labour government of Johan Nygaardsvold while Nazi Germany invaded the country. His coup was rejected as illegitimate by King Haakon VII and Quisling would hold little power during the Nazi occupation.

== Oman ==
1. July 23, 1970: Qaboos bin Said overthrew his father Said bin Taimur during the Dhofar Rebellion.

== Panama ==
1. January 2, 1931: Members of Acción Comunal launched a successful coup against Florencio Harmodio Arosemena.
2. October 9, 1941: A successful coup removed Arnulfo Arias from presidency and replaced him with Ricardo de la Guardia.
3. November 20, 1949: Police Chief José Antonio Remón pressured the resignation of President Daniel Chanis Pinzón.
4. May 9, 1951: A popular uprising, supported by the National Guard, overthrew Arnulfo Arias.
5. April 1959: With the help of Cuban mercenaries, diplomat Roberto Arias and ballerina Margot Fonteyn plotted to spark a coup or revolution against President Ernesto de la Guardia.
6. October 11, 1968: Boris Martínez and Omar Torrijos lead a military coup that ousts Arnulfo Arias.
7. December 16, 1969: A group of military officers, loyal to Omar Torrijos, foiled a coup attempt.
8. March 16, 1988: A first coup attempt against Manuel Noriega was led by Leonidas Macias.
9. October 3, 1989: A second coup attempt against Manuel Noriega was led by Moisés Giroldi.
10. December 5, 1990: A coup attempt against Guillermo Endara was led by Eduardo Herrera Hassan.

== Pakistan ==
1. March 9, 1951: Major General Akbar Khan led a coup against the Muslim League government of Prime Minister Liaquat Ali Khan in protest of the government's acceptance of a ceasefire in the First Indo-Pakistani War. This was the first attempted military coup in Pakistan's history.
2. 1953: A constitutional coup was launched by Malik Ghulam Muhammad.
3. October 27, 1958: Field Marshal Ayub Khan overthrew Iskander Mirza in response to his suspension of the Constitution and declaration of martial law.
4. March 25, 1969: A coup was by General Yahya Khan. Ayub Khan resigned.
5. 1973: A coup to overthrow Zulfikar Ali Bhutto failed.
6. July 4, 1977: General Muhammad Zia-ul-Haq and the Pakistan National Alliance overthrew Zulfikar Ali Bhutto after a contested general election.
7. March 1980: The first coup attempt to overthrow Muhammad Zia-ul-Haq failed.
8. 1984: The second coup attempt to overthrow Muhammad Zia-ul-Haq failed.
9. 1995: A group of Pakistan Armed Forces officers, led by Zahirul Islam Abbasi, plotted to overthrow the Pakistan People's Party government of Benazir Bhutto.
10. October 12, 1999: General Pervez Musharraf overthrew the PML-N government Prime Minister Nawaz Sharif and suspended the writ of the Constitution due to Sharif's intent to relieve him as Chairman Joint Chiefs of Staff Committee.

== Papua New Guinea ==
1. March 16, 1990: Coup attempt by police commissioner Paul Tohian against Prime Minister Rabbie Namaliu was caused by the situation in Bougainville and Tohian being drunk.
2. January 26, 2012: A coup attempt was led by retired colonel Yaura Sasa against disputed Prime Minister Peter O'Neill. This coup occurred amid the Papuan constitutional crisis.

== Paraguay ==
1. September 4, 1880: Bernardino Caballero was appointed as interim president by Congress after the death of President Cándido Bareiro and the forced resignation by a coup of Vice president Adolfo Saguier.
2. June 9, 1894: Juan Bautista Egusquiza overthrew Juan Gualberto González. Congress appointed Marcos Morínigo as interim president.
3. January 9, 1902: Bernardino Caballero overthrew Emilio Aceval. Congress appointed Andrés Héctor Carvallo as interim president.
4. December 19, 1904: Juan Antonio Escurra was deposed. Congress appointed Juan Bautista Gaona as interim president.
5. December 9, 1905: Juan Bautista Gaona was deposed. Congress appointed Cecilio Báez as interim president.
6. July 4, 1908: Benigno Ferreira was deposed.
7. January 17, 1911: Albino Jara overthrew Manuel Gondra.
8. January 14, 1912: Marcos Caballero Codas, Mario Uscher, and Alfredo Aponte overthrew Liberato Marcial Rojas.
9. February 28, 1912: Liberato Marcial Rojas was deposed. Congress appointed Pedro Pablo Peña as interim president by Congress.
10. March 22, 1912: Pedro Pablo Peña was deposed. Congress appointed Emiliano González Navero as interim president.
11. February 17, 1936: Rafael Franco overthrew Eusebio Ayala.
12. August 13, 1937: Félix Paiva overthrew Rafael Franco.
13. February 18, 1940: José Félix Estigarribia conducts a self-coup.
14. June 3, 1948: Higinio Morínigo was deposed. Congress appointed Juan Manuel Frutos as interim president.
15. October 25, 1948: Alfredo Stroessner attempted to depose Juan Natalicio González.
16. January 30, 1949: Juan Natalicio González was deposed. Congress appointed Raimundo Rolón appointed as interim president.
17. February 26, 1949: Felipe Molas López overthrew Raimundo Rolón.
18. September 11, 1949: Felipe Molas López was deposed. Congress appointed Federico Chaves as interim president.
19. May 4, 1954: Alfredo Stroessner overthrew Federico Chaves. Congress appointed Tomás Romero Pereira as interim president.
20. February 3, 1989: Andrés Rodríguez and the Paraguayan Army overthrew Alfredo Stroessner.
21. April 22–25, 1996: General Lino Oviedo attempted to depose Juan Carlos Wasmosy.
22. May 18–19, 2000: An attempted coup against Luis González Macchi failed.

== Peru ==
1. February 27, 1823: José de la Riva Agüero led a coup against the Supreme Governing Junta of Peru.
2. June 7, 1829: Agustín Gamarra led a coup against José de la Mar.
3. February 23, 1835: Felipe Santiago Salaverry led a coup against Luis José de Orbegoso.
4. August 16, 1842: Juan Crisóstomo Torrico led a coup against Manuel Menéndez.
5. November 25, 1865: Mariano Ignacio Prado led a coup against Pedro Diez Canseco.
6. July 22, 1872: Tomás Gutiérrez led a coup against José Balta.
7. December 23, 1879: Nicolás de Piérola led a coup against Mariano Ignacio Prado.
8. May 29, 1909: Carlos de Piérola led a coup against Augusto B. Leguía.
9. February 4, 1914: Óscar R. Benavides led a coup against Guillermo Billinghurst.
10. July 4, 1919: Augusto B. Leguía led a coup against José Pardo y Barreda.
11. August 22, 1930: Luis Miguel Sánchez Cerro led a coup against Augusto B. Leguía y Salcedo.
12. October 29, 1948: Manuel A. Odría led a coup against José Luis Bustamante y Rivero.
13. July 18, 1962: Ricardo Pérez Godoy led a coup against Manuel Prado Ugarteche.
14. October 3, 1968: Juan Velasco Alvarado led a coup against Fernando Belaúnde.
15. August 29, 1975: Francisco Morales Bermúdez led a coup against Juan Velasco Alvarado.
16. April 5, 1992: Alberto Fujimori conducts a self-coup.
17. November 13, 1992: Jaime Salinas Sedó led a coup against Alberto Fujimori.
18. October 29, 2000: Ollanta Humala led a coup against Alberto Fujimori.
19. January 1, 2005: A coup attempt led by Antauro Humala against Alejandro Toledo fails.
20. December 7, 2022: Pedro Castillo attempts a self-coup.

== Philippines ==
The following list includes plots that did aim to overthrow the national government.

=== Prior to Independence ===
1. 1587–1588: The failed Tondo Conspiracy was crushed by the Spanish colonial government.
2. October 11, 1719: Successful overthrow and assassination of Governor-General Fernando Manuel de Bustillo Bustamante y Rueda by supporters of Manila Archbishop Francisco de la Cuesta.
3. June 1, 1823: A failed revolt by Andrés Novales and Creole members of the Spanish Army was crushed by the Spanish colonial government.
4. 1828: The failed Palmero Conspiracy was thwarted by the Spanish colonial government.
5. January 20, 1872: The failed Cavite mutiny was crushed by the Spanish colonial government.
6. December 5, 1896: The failed Manila mutiny, crushed by the Spanish colonial government.

=== Marcos Era ===
1. May 21, 1967: A failed overthrow by Lapiang Malaya of the Third Philippine Republic was led by President Ferdinand Marcos. It ended with government forces killing and arresting the participants.
2. September 21, 1972: Ferdinand Marcos declares martial law in a self-coup.
3. February 22–25, 1986: The People Power Revolution, a civilian-backed military coup led by Juan Ponce Enrile and Fidel V. Ramos overthrew Marcos as president.

=== Fifth Republic ===
1. July 6–8, 1986: A failed coup attempt, by former senator and vice presidential candidate Arturo Tolentino together with 490 armed soldiers and 15,000 civilians loyal to former president Ferdinand Marcos, was crushed by the government.
2. November 11, 1986: A failed coup attempt, led by Juan Ponce Enrile, ended with the removal of Enrile and re-organization of Corazon Aquino's cabinet.
3. January 27–29, 1987: A failed coup attempt, led by Colonel Oscar Canlas, ended with one rebel soldier killed, and 35 others injured.
4. April 18, 1987: A failed coup attempt ended with one rebel soldier killed.
5. July 13, 1987: An alleged coup attempt ended with four officers being sued in military court.
6. August 28–29, 1987: A failed coup attempt, led by Colonel Gregorio Honasan, was crushed by the government.
7. December 1–9, 1989: A failed coup attempt, led by Colonel Gregorio Honasan together with soldiers loyal to former president Marcos, was crushed by the government.
8. January 17–20, 2001: A four-day political protest, held in EDSA, peacefully overthrew the government of President Joseph Estrada
9. April 25 to May 1, 2001: A seven-day counter-protest was held. also in EDSA, in a failed attempt to bring Joseph Estrada back to power.
10. July 27, 2003: A failed coup attempt saw the surrender of mutinous soldiers after taking over the Oakwood condominiums in the Makati Central Business District.
11. February 24, 2006: A state of emergency was declared to forestall alleged coup against the government

Alleged plots that were not attempted:

1. 2018–2021: Allegations of ouster plot against President Rodrigo Duterte were first publicized by the military. The allegations mainly implicated the opposition figures and the critics of the Duterte administration of involvement in the plot.

Attempts to wrest control of a chamber of Congress are plots, not coups, because the do not the definition of "removal of an existing government from power" because the head of state and government are not at stake (The Philippines uses the presidential system of government with separation of powers). There had been several instances of this, the latest of which were in 2020 in the House of Representatives and in 2018 in the Senate. One example was in March to April 1952 when the Senate presidency changed three times.

== Poland ==
1. 1919: National Democratic attempt was led by Marian Januszajtis-Żegota and Prince Eustachy Sapieha to overthrow Jędrzej Moraczewski and Józef Piłsudski's left-wing government.
2. May 1926: Józef Piłsudski overthrew the Chjeno-Piast government of President Stanisław Wojciechowski and Prime Minister Wincenty Witos, appointing Kazimierz Bartel as the new prime minister and beginning the Sanation regime.
3. December 13, 1981: General Wojciech Jaruzelski declared martial law and banned the Solidarity union, forming the Military Council of National Salvation.
4. 2026 Polish coup d'état allegations: On 30-31 October Prime Minister Donald Tusk ordered the removal of judges from the Constitutional Tribunal appointed by the previously ruling Law and Justice party, which sparked a major constitutional crisis.

== Portugal ==
1. 1820: This political revolution began with a military insurrection in the city of Porto that quickly and peacefully spread to the rest of the country. The Revolution resulted in the return in 1821 of the Portuguese court from Brazil, where it had fled during the Peninsular War, and initiated a constitutional period in which the 1822 Constitution was ratified and implemented.
2. April 1824: Absolutist revolt that took place in the United Kingdom of Portugal, Brazil and the Algarves.
3. November 1836: Queen Maria II of Portugal and her husband Ferdinand II attempted a coup to remove the liberal government established by the September Revolution and reinstate the Constitutional Charter of 1826.
4. 1837: An unsuccessful Chartist military coup against the Setembrist government of António Dias de Oliveira led by marshals João Carlos de Saldanha and Terceira.
5. 1842: Coup of Costa Cabral.
6. October 6, 1846: A palace coup by which queen Maria II deposed the government presided over by Pedro de Sousa Holstein, 1st Duke of Palmela, that had been installed on May 20 that year as a result of the Revolution of Maria da Fonte.
7. 1846–1847: The Patuleia occurred after the Revolution of Maria da Fonte. It was caused by the nomination, as a result of the palace coup of October 6, 1846, known as the "Emboscada," to set up a clearly Cartista government presided over by marshal João Oliveira e Daun, Duque de Saldanha.
8. 1851: Revolt of João Carlos de Saldanha (beginning of Regeneração).
9. July 22, 1872: A coup by Caetano Gaspar de Almeida e Noronha against Fontes Pereira de Melo failed.
10. January 31, 1891: republican uprising in response to the 1890 British Ultimatum.
11. January 28, 1908: attempted coup by republicans.
12. October 5, 1910: A republican coup d'état deposed King Manuel II of Portugal and established the First Portuguese Republic.
13. May 14, 1915: An uprising overthrew Joaquim Pimenta de Castro's government.
14. December 1917: A coup d'état led to Sidónio Pais' dictatorship.
15. October 1921: A coup led António Granjo's government to resign, but President António José de Almeida resisted appointing the rebels' government.
16. April 18, 1925: The military failed to carry out a coup.
17. July 19, 1925: A Revolt against José Mendes Cabeçadas failed.
18. May 28, 1926: General Manuel Gomes da Costa and the Portuguese Armed Forces overthrew the First Portuguese Republic, establishing the Ditadura Nacional.
19. February 3, 1927: A failed coup attempt was led by Mendes dos Reis, Agatão Lança, Câmara Lente, and Filipe Mendes.
20. Jul 20, 1928: A failed coup attempt was led by Liga de Paris and Major Sarmento Beires.
21. August 26, 1931: A failed coup attempt was led by Hélder Ribeiro, Utra Machado, Jaime Batista, Dias Antunes, and Sarmento Beires.
22. April 8, 1961: Failed coup attempt led by Minister of Defense Júlio Botelho Moniz.
23. March 16, 1974: Failed coup attempt involving Captain Otelo Saraiva de Carvalho, who would later go on to lead the Carnation Revolution
24. April 25, 1974: The Armed Forces Movement overthrew the Estado Novo dictatorship de facto led by António de Oliveira Salazar's successor Marcelo Caetano, establishing the National Salvation Junta and founding the Carnation Revolution.
25. March 11, 1975: A coup attempt by right-wing military units fostered by former president António de Spínola failed, leading contrariwise to a leftward turn of the Carnation Revolution (Processo Revolucionário em Curso. PREC, Ongoing Revolutionary Process) and the Hot Summer of 1975. Elections to the Constituent Assembly take place the following month.
26. November 25, 1975: A coup attempt led by far-left military units failed, putting an end to PREC. The current Constitution of Portugal was approved and came into force five months later.

== Qatar ==
1. February 22, 1972: Heir-apparent Khalifa bin Hamad Al Thani deposed Emir Ahmad bin Ali Al Thani.
2. June 27, 1995: Heir-apparent Hamad bin Khalifa Al Thani deposed Emir Khalifa bin Hamad Al Thani.
3. February 14, 1996: Hamad bin Jassim bin Hamad Al Thani attempted and failed to depose Emir Hamad bin Khalifa Al Thani.

== Romania ==
1. 1866: The "monstrous coalition" of Liberals and Conservatives conducted a coup against Prince Alexandru Ioan Cuza.
2. 1938: King Carol II of Romania led a coup against Corneliu Zelea Codreanu and the Iron Guard.
3. 1940: Horia Sima and Ion Antonescu overthrew Carol II of Romania and created the National Legionary State.
4. 1941: The Iron Guard unsuccessfully revolted against Ion Antonescu, leading to the suppression of the Iron Guard and a major pogrom in Bucharest.
5. 1944: King Michael I of Romania and Constantin Sănătescu removed Ion Antonescu's government from power due to the Soviet invasion of Romania.
6. 1947: Prime Minister Petru Groza forced King Michael I to abdicate, forming the Socialist Republic of Romania.
7. 1984: Coup attempt against Nicolae Ceaușescu was led by the army.
8. 1989: Ion Iliescu and his National Salvation Front overthrew Nicolae Ceaușescu alongside civil unrest and a series of uprisings, ending the Romanian Communist Party's rule;
9. 1999: miners from Valea Jiului, led by Miron Cozma and supported by Corneliu Vadim Tudor's Greater Romania Party, unsuccessfully attempted to overthrow the CDR-led government.
10. December 2024: far-right presidential candidate Calin Georgescu attempted to stage a coup after the first round of the presidential election, which he won (allegedly following Russian interference), was annulled. Horatiu Potra, a former militia chief in the Democratic Republic of Congo, and 20 other people were also charged as co-conspirators.

== Russia ==
=== Russian Empire ===
1. 1741: Elizabeth Petrovna overthrew her infant cousin Ivan VI of Russia and his mother Anna Leopoldovna.
2. 1762: A coup by Catherine the Great forced the abdication of Peter III of Russia.
3. December 1825: The Decembrist revolt attempted to depose Tsar Nicholas I of Russia in favor of his brother, Grand Duke Konstantin by military coup.
4. June 1907: A self-coup was carried out by Russian prime minister Pyotr Stolypin, with the dissolution of the Second Duma.
5. March 15, 1917: Tsar Nicholas II of Russia was forced to abdicate in favour of the Russian Provisional Government, ending the Romanov dynasty.

=== Revolutionary Russia ===
1. September 1917: Lavr Kornilov attempted to march into Petrograd, overthrow the Provisional Government, dissolve the Petrograd Soviet and possibly establish a military dictatorship after being appointed Commander-in-Chief of the Russian Army by Alexander Kerensky. The coup failed because of a lack of support and mass resistance, but it eroded the Provisional Government's legitimacy and revived the Bolsheviks. It also resulted in the provisional government formally abolishing the Russian monarchy and proclaiming the Russian Republic.
2. November 7, 1917: The Bolshevik faction of the Russian Social Democratic Labor Party, led by Vladimir Lenin, overthrew the Russian Provisional Government and formed the Russian Soviet Federative Socialist Republic, leading to the Russian Civil War and the formation of the Soviet Union.
3. 1918: An attempt by Sidney Reilly to remove the Bolsheviks from power failed.
4. August 2, 1918: Captain Georgi Chaplin deposed the Bolshevik government of Arkhangelsk, establishing the Supreme Administration of the Northern Region, led by Nikolai Tchaikovsky.
5. September 6, 1918: Captain Georgi Chaplin attempted a second coup in Arkhangelsk, dispatching the Popular Socialists' Cabinet to the Solovetsky Islands, but his coup failed because of a lack of support and mass resistance.
6. November 18, 1918: Admiral Alexander Kolchak deposed the Omsk Directory, then headed by Nikolai Avksentiev, and proclaimed himself Supreme Ruler of Russia.
7. May 26, 1921: White army coup established the Provisional Priamurye Government.

=== Soviet Union ===
1. June 1957: The "Anti-Party Group" unsuccessfully attempted to remove Nikita Khrushchev from power.
2. October 13, 1964: Nikita Khrushchev was forced to resign, handing power to Leonid Brezhnev.
3. August 19–21, 1991: A group of CPSU hardliners formed the State Committee on the State of Emergency attempted to overthrow President Mikhail Gorbachev to reverse his reforms. The coup was suppressed by RSFSR President Boris Yeltsin, weakening the Communist Party's authority and accelerating the dissolution of the Soviet Union.

=== Russian Federation ===
1. September 21 to October 4, 1993: President Boris Yeltsin, aided by the Russian Armed Forces, extralegally dissolved the Supreme Soviet and suspended the constitution in response to impeachment proceedings against him.
2. 2023: Wagner Group rebellion

== Rwanda ==
1. December 1896: A royal coup overthrew Mibambwe IV Rutarindwa and replaced him with Yuhi V Musinga.
2. January 28, 1961: The monarchy in Rwanda, then a part of the Belgian mandate of Ruanda-Urundi, was abolished and replaced with a republican political system.
3. July 5, 1973: Juvénal Habyarimana overthrew Grégoire Kayibanda.

== São Tomé and Príncipe ==
1. March 8, 1988: Afonso dos Santos failed to overthrow Manuel Pinto da Costa.
2. August 15, 1995: Manuel Quintas de Almeida overthrew Miguel Trovoada for six days.
3. July 16, 2003: Fernando Pereira overthrew Fradique de Menezes for seven days.
4. November 24–25, 2022: A few men, including Delfim Neves, president of the outgoing National Assembly, allegedly tried to overthrow the government.

== Saudi Arabia ==
1. November 1964: At the request of Crown Prince Faisal (Ibn Saud's third son), his brother Muhammad bin Abdulaziz (Ibn Saud's fourth son) led a palace coup that ousted King Saud (Ibn Saud's second son), making Faisal king.
2. 1969: Members of the Royal Saudi Air Force, inspired by the Free Officers Movement in Libya, attempted to overthrow King Faisal.
3. June 21, 2017: Prince Mohammed bin Salman ousted and succeeded Saudi Crown Prince and de facto leader Muhammad bin Nayef in what was described as a "palace coup".
4. March 7, 2020: the Saudi Arabian government arrested Princes Ahmed bin Abdulaziz, Muhammad bin Nayef, Nayef bin Ahmed, Nawwaf bin Nayef and Muhammad bin Saad for allegedly planning a coup attempt.

== San Marino ==
1. 1933: A failed coup was led by Antonio Canepa against the fascist regime of Giuliano Gozi.
2. 1957: A quasi-coup led to the coexistence of two governments for a month.

== Scotland ==
1. 1688: William III of Orange invaded England and Scotland at the invitation of the country's powerful Protestants, deposing the Catholic James II of England and VII of Scotland.

== Serbia ==
1. 1842: Mihailo Obrenović III was overthrown, resulting in the succession of the House of Karađorđević to the Serbian throne.
2. 1858: Prince Alexander Karađorđević of Serbia was overthrown by Milan Obrenovic III, restoring the Obrenovic dynasty.
3. May 28–29, 1903: This coup resulted in the assassination of King Alexander I and his consort, Queen Draga, resulting in the extinction of the Obrenović dynasty that had ruled Serbia since the middle of the 19th century. A group of Royal Serbian Army officers led by Captain Dragutin Dimitrijević organized the assassination. After the May Coup, the throne passed to King Peter I of the Karađorđević dynasty.

== Seychelles ==
1. June 5, 1977: France-Albert René overthrew James Mancham.
2. November 25, 1981: South African mercenaries attempted to replace France-Albert René with former president James Mancham
3. 1986: There was a series of coup attempts against President René led by the Seychelles Minister of Defence, Ogilvy Berlouis. Operation Flowers are Blooming was the name of an operation by the Indian Navy to help avert a threatened coup against René.

== Sierra Leone ==
1. March 21, 1967: David Lansana overthrew Siaka Stevens.
2. March 23, 1967: David Lansana was deposed by the National Reformation Council.
3. April 19, 1968: John Amadu Bangura overthrew Andrew Juxon-Smith.
4. April 29, 1992: Valentine Strasser overthrew Joseph Saidu Momoh.
5. January 16, 1996: Julius Maada Bio overthrew Valentine Strasser.
6. May 25, 1997: Johnny Paul Koroma overthrew Ahmad Tejan Kabbah.
7. July 31, 2023: Sierra Leone police arrested 19 people—including 14 serving personnel of the Republic of Sierra Leone Armed Forces, 2 officers of the Sierra Leone Police, and 1 retired chief superintendent of police—who were allegedly planning a coup between August 7 and 10. In addition, five military officers and three police officers were subject to a search and capture warrant.
8. November 26, 2023: An attempted coup involving attacks on barracks and a prison resulted in the death of 19 people. The incident resulted in the arrest of 13 officers and 1 civilian.

== Slovakia ==
1. 2025 Slovakia coup d'état plot allegations

== South Africa ==
=== 19th century South Africa ===
==== South African Republic (Transvaal) ====
1. December 6, 1860: Stephanus Schoeman overthrew Johannes Hermanus Grobler.

==== Zulu Kingdom ====
1. September 24, 1828: Dingane, alongside Mhlangana, deposed Shaka Zulu via assassination and took the throne.
2. 1840: Mpande, with the support of Boer forces, deposed Dingane and took the throne.

=== Apartheid-Era Bantustans ===
==== Transkei ====
1. December 30, 1987: Bantu Holomisa overthrew Stella Sigcau.
2. November 22, 1990: A bloody attempted coup led by Colonel Craig Duli was defeated by the loyalist forces of General Bantu Holomisa.

==== Bophuthatswana ====
1. February 10, 1988: A short-lived coup that installed Rocky Malebane-Metsing as president of Bophuthatswana was defeated by intervention by the South African Defence Force, which reinstated Lucas Mangope to the position.
2. March 11, 1994: Lucas Mangope was overthrown by mutinying Bophuthatswana Defence Force forces supported by the South African Defence Force. Bophuthatswana, a bantustan established during apartheid, was reincorporated into South Africa.

==== Venda ====
1. April 5, 1990: Gabriel Ramushwana overthrew Frank Ravele.

==== Ciskei ====
1. March 4, 1990: Oupa Gqozo and the Ciskei Defence Force overthrow Lennox Sebe.

=== Post-Apartheid South Africa ===
1. 2002: A failed plot led by white supremacists linked to Boeremag to overthrow the African National Congress government. The conspiracy included an assassination attempt on former president Nelson Mandela and bomb attacks.

== Solomon Islands ==
1. June 5, 2000: Malaita Eagle Force overthrew Prime Minister Bartholomew Ulufa'alu.

== Somalia ==
1. December, 1961: An attempt by army officers to restore the independence of Somaliland failed.
2. October 21, 1969: Muhammad Siad Barre overthrew Sheikh Mukhtar Mohamed Hussein.
3. April 9, 1978: A coup attempt against Muhammad Siad Barre failed.
4. January 26, 1991: Mohammed Farrah Aidid and the United Somali Congress overthrew Muhammad Siad Barre, beginning the Somali Civil War.

== Spain ==
=== Visigothic Kingdom ===
1. 603: General Witerico overthrew king Liuva II.
2. 631: Duke Sisenando overthrew King Suintila.
3. 642: Tulga was overthrown by Chindasvinto.
4. 692: Égica was briefly overthrown by Suniefredo.

=== Kingdom of Spain ===
1. 1814: Absolutist pronunciamiento took place against Ferdinand VII and Francisco Javier de Elío.
2. 1815: A failed liberal pronunciamiento was led by Juan Díaz Porlier at A Coruña.
3. 1820: A successful liberal pronunciamiento was led by Rafael del Riego, leading to the start of the Trienio Liberal.
4. 1822: An absolutist coup by the Royal Guard of Ferdinand VII failed.
5. 1831: A liberal pronunciamiento led by Manuel de Torrijos failed.
6. 1835: A liberal pronunciamiento was led by Cordero y de Quesada.
7. 1836: A successful liberal mutiny was led by La Granja de San Ildefonso.
8. 1841: There was a failed Moderate pronunciamiento.
9. 1843: A successful Moderate pronunciamiento led by Ramón María Narváez and Francisco Serrano y Domínguez ended of the Baldomero Espartero regency.
10. 1844: A failed liberal and Esparterist coup was led by Martín Zurbano.
11. 1846: A failed progressive liberal military and civic revolt in Galicia was led by Miguel Solís Cuetos.
12. 1848: A failed progressive liberal military and civic revolt in Madrid was led by colonel Manuel Buceta.
13. 1854: A successful revolutionary coup in Madrid was led by general Leopoldo O'Donnell.
14. 1860: A failed Carlist military uprising at Sant Carles de la Ràpita was led by general Jaime Ortega y Olleta.
15. 1866: A failed Progressive and Democrat coup took place in Madrid.
16. 1866: A failed pronunciamiento against Villarejo de Salvanés was led by general Juan Prim.
17. 1868: The successful Glorious Revolution was started by the pronunciamiento of Juan Bautista Topete in Cádiz.

=== First Spanish Republic ===
1. 1874: A successful coup was led by General Pavía.
2. 1874: A successful Pronunciamiento de Sagunto ended the First Spanish Republic and restored the monarchy and the House of Bourbon.

=== Kingdom of Spain ===
1. August 5, 1883: A republican pronunciamiento in Badajoz failed.
2. 1886: A republican coup failed in Madrid. It was led by Manuel Villacampa del Castillo and Manuel Ruiz Zorrilla.
3. 1923: Spanish Army regiments led by Miguel Primo de Rivera overthrew Prime Minister Manuel García Prieto and established a dictatorship with the support of King Alfonso XIII.
4. 1926: The Sanjuanada, a coup against the dictatorship of Miguel Primo de Rivera, failed.
5. 1929: A failed coup against the dictatorship of Miguel Primo de Rivera was led by José Sánchez-Guerra y Martínez.
6. 1930: Fermín Galán led the failed Jaca uprising, a republican pronunciamiento against the monarchy in Jaca.

=== Second Spanish Republic ===
1. August 10, 1932: José Sanjurjo unsuccessfully tried to overthrow Prime Minister Manuel Azaña's Republican Left government, although the coup plotters disagreed over whether to next dissolve the Second Spanish Republic.
2. 1936: planned coup by Carlists. The operation was cancelled.
3. July 1936: A military uprising led by Emilio Mola in which Francisco Franco participated, against Prime Minister Manuel Azaña and the Second Spanish Republic, started the Spanish Civil War.
4. November 1936: coup planned by Catalan nationalist party Estat Català to overthrow the autonomous Catalan government and declare the independence of Catalonia. It was prevented by a pre-emptive strike of Generalitat
5. 1939: Segismundo Casado and Julián Besteiro overthrew the PSOE government of Juan Negrín in Republican-controlled Spain to negotiate a ceasefire with the Nationalists, forming the National Defense Council.

=== Kingdom of Spain ===
1. November 17, 1978: An aborted Guardia Civil coup was led by Antonio Tejero to stop the Spanish transition to democracy.
2. February 23, 1981: A faction of the Spanish Armed Forces led by Tejero broke into the Congress of Deputies while they were preparing to elect Leopoldo Calvo-Sotelo as the new prime minister. King Juan Carlos I denounced the coup in a nationally televised address, and the coup collapsed the next day with no casualties.
3. October 27, 1982: A group of far-right colonels failed to overthrow Leopoldo Calvo-Sotelo.
4. June 2, 1985: A group of far-right soldiers and officers (along with some civilians) planned to take power following a false-flag attack, but the conspiracy was later aborted.

== Sri Lanka ==
1. 1962: Christian military officers attempted to topple the government under Sirimavo Bandaranaike.
2. 1966: Alleged attempt by the military to overthrow the government under Sirimavo Bandaranaike.
3. 1971: Attempted overthrow of the government under Sirimavo Bandaranaike by the Marxist–Leninist JVP, devolved into a two-month insurrection.

== Sudan ==
1. June 1957: Abdel Rahman Ismail Kabeida failed to overthrow the Sudanese Government.
2. November 16, 1958: Ibrahim Abboud overthrew Abdallah Khalil.
3. November 9, 1959 The Sudanese Armed Forces failed to overthrow Ibrahim Abboud.
4. 1964: The October Revolution, driven by a general strike and rioting, forced President Ibrahim Abboud to transfer executive power to a transitional civilian government, and eventually to resign.
5. May 25, 1969: Gaafar Nimeiry overthrew Ismail al-Azhari.
6. July 19–22, 1971: Communist members of the National Revolutionary Command Council led by Hashem al Atta attempted to overthrow Nimeiry but failed due to a lack of support.
7. September 5, 1975: The members of the Sudanese Communist Party failed to overthrow Gaafar Nimeiry.
8. July 2, 1976: Rebels failed to overthrow Gaafar Nimeiry.
9. February 2, 1977: Failed coup attempt in Juba was led by former members of the Anyanya in the Sudanese Air Force.
10. April 6, 1985: Abdel Rahman Swar al-Dahab overthrew Gaafar Nimeiry, establishing the Transitional Military Council.
11. June 30, 1989: Omar al-Bashir and the National Islamic Front overthrew President Ahmed al-Mirghani and Prime Minister Sadiq al-Mahdi, creating the Revolutionary Command Council for National Salvation.
12. April 23, 1990: The first coup to overthrow Omar al-Bashir failed.
13. March 1992: The second coup to overthrow Omar al-Bashir failed.
14. March 2004: The third coup to overthrow Omar al-Bashir failed.
15. May 10, 2008: The fourth coup to overthrow Omar al-Bashir failed.
16. November 22, 2012: The fifth coup to overthrow Omar al-Bashir failed.
17. April 10, 2019: The Sudanese Armed Forces led by Ahmed Awad Ibn Auf overthrow Omar al-Bashir during the Sudanese Revolution.
18. September 21, 2021: An attempted coup against the ruling Transitional Sovereignty Council by forces loyal to Omar al-Bashir fails.
19. October 25, 2021: The Sudanese Armed Forces, led by Abdel Fattah al-Burhan, seized control of the government following the arrest of Prime Minister Abdalla Hamdok and other civilian members of the Transitional Sovereignty Council.
20. April 15, 2023–ongoing: coup attempt led by the Rapid Support Forces (RSF), which escalated into civil war.

== Suriname ==
1. May 25–26, 1910: A failed coup d'état was led by police officer Frans Killinger.
2. November 7–8, 1947: A failed coup d'état was led by Simon Sanches.
3. February 25, 1980: A military coup led by Dési Bouterse ousted Prime Minister Henck Arron.
4. August 13, 1980: The military, led by Dési Bouterse, ousted President Johan Ferrier.
5. March 15, 1981: A counter-coup led by Wilfred Hawker failed.
6. March 10–11, 1982: A counter-coup led by Surendre Rambocus failed.
7. December 24, 1990: President Ramsewak Shankar was dismissed by Suriname's military.

== Switzerland ==
1. 1717: Wilchingen rebelled against the City of Schaffhausen.
2. 1719: Werdenberg rebelled against Glarus.
3. 1723: The military was led by Major Abraham Davel (Vaud) in rebellion against Bern.
4. 1726: Peasants of Jura rebelled against the Bistum of Basel.
5. 1755: Leventina (Ticino) rebelled against Canton Uri.
6. 1781: Chenaux (Fribourg) rebelled against the Canton of Fribourg.
7. 1797: Peasants of Baselgebiet rebelled against the City of Basel and ousted Peter Ochs and Peter Vischer.
8. January 8, 1800: Republicans (Hans Conrad Escher von der Linth, Paul Usteri, Albrecht Rengger, and Bernhard Friedrich Kuhn) ousted the Patriots (Karl Albrecht von Frisching, Karl von Müller-Friedberg, and Carl Heinrich Gschwend).
9. August 7, 1800: Patriots ousted the Republicans.
10. October 27–28, 1801: Federalist (Alois von Reding and Johann Rudolf von Frisching), with help from the French Raymond Verninac, ousted the Unitarier and Patriots.
11. April 17, 1802: Unitarier, led by Bernhard Friedrich Kuhns, ousted the Federalist Alois von Reding.
12. September 6, 1839: A radical movement led by Conrad Melchior Hirzel and Friedrich Ludwig von Keller ousted the Liberals and killed Johannes Hegetschweiler.

== Sweden ==
1. May 18, 1160: King Eric the Holy was killed on orders of Magnus Henriksson, who took power as king of Sweden.
2. April 12, 1167: King Charles Sverkersson was killed by men loyal to Canute Ericsson, who was declared king and consolidated his power in 1173.
3. June 14, 1275: King Valdemar Birgersson lost the Battle of Hova against his brother, Magnus Birgersson, who subsequently took power and was elected king in July.
4. 1439: King Eric of Denmark, Sweden, and Norway (Kalmar Union) was deposed from the Danish and Swedish thrones, and from the Norwegian throne in 1440.
5. June 1448: Charles Canutesson was elected and hailed as king of Sweden under the pressure of his own private army.
6. 1457: Charles Canutesson was ousted following a rebellion by the archbishop and the high nobility.
7. 1520: In the Battle of Bogesund and Stockholm Bloodbath, Christian II of Denmark deposed Sten Sture the Younger and became king of Sweden.
8. 1521–1523: Christian II, is deposed in the Vasa rebellion, effectively finally ending the Kalmar Union and making Gustaf Vasa king Gustaf I of Sweden.
9. 1568–1569: a rebellion among the nobility deposed king Eric XIV of Sweden and inserted his brother, John III of Sweden, as king.
10. 1569: The plot against John III of Sweden, seeking to reinstate Eric XIV of Sweden failed.
11. 1574: The plot against John III, seeking to reinstate Eric XIV, failed.
12. 1576: The 1576 plot against John III, seeking to reinstate Eric XIV, failed.
13. 1598–1600: In the War against Sigismund and the Linköping Bloodbath in 1600, Sigismund of Sweden was deposed and succeeded by his uncle Duke Charles who was some years later crowned as Charles IX of Sweden.
14. 1756: Queen Louisa Ulrika's coup against the Riksdag of the Estates failed.
15. 1772: King Gustaf III of Sweden dismissed the Riksdag of the Estates, ending the Age of Liberty.
16. 1789: The 1789 Conspiracy of Charlotte of Holstein-Gottorp against her brother-in-law Gustaf III failed.
17. 1793: The Armfelt Conspiracy by Gustaf Mauritz Armfelt, in companionship with Magdalena Rudenschöld, with the intent to depose the guardian government of king Gustav IV Adolf of Sweden, was exposed.
18. 1809: A number of noblemen in the Swedish Army overthrew king Gustav IV Adolf of Sweden after the Finnish War.
19. 1917–1918: Riots in Stockholm were followed by Socialist threats of revolution, but the plans were never realized. However, king Gustaf V finally accepted parliamentarism and appointed Nils Edén as prime minister for a Liberal-Social Democrat coalition government to ease political tension

== Syria ==
1. March 29, 1949: Husni al-Za'im led a coup against Shukri al-Quwatli.
2. August 14, 1949: Sami al-Hinnawi led a coup against Husni al-Za'im.
3. December 19, 1949: Adib Shishakli ousted the de facto leader Sami al-Hinnawi.
4. November 29, 1951: Adib Shishakli overthrew the cabinet of Maarouf al-Dawalibi. President Hashim al-Atassi later resigned in protest, paving the way for Shishakli's military rule.
5. February 25, 1954: Maamun al-Kuzbari led a coup against Adib Shishakli.
6. September 28, 1961: Haydar al-Kuzbari and others led a coup against Gamal Abdel Nasser.
7. March 28, 1962: Abd al-Karim al-Nahlawi and Abd al-Karim Zahr al-Din attempted and failed to overthrow president Nazim al-Qudsi.
8. March 8, 1963: Lu'ay al-Atassi and the Arab Socialist Ba'ath Party – Syria Region overthrew the Second Syrian Republic under Nazim al-Qudsi.
9. July 17–18, 1963: Nasserist officers attempted and failed to overthrow the Syrian Ba'athist regime.
10. February 21–23, 1966: Salah Jadid overthrew Amin al-Hafiz and the Ba'ath National Command, leading to a split in the Ba'ath Party.
11. September 8, 1966: Salim Hatum attempted and failed to overthrow Salah Jadid.
12. November 13, 1970: Hafez al-Assad overthrew Salah Jadid.
13. 1982: hundreds of Syrian Air Force officers became involved in a coup attempt against President Hafez al-Assad, originally planned to take place in coordination with an armed uprising in the city of Hama.
14. March 30, 1984: Rifaat al-Assad orchestrated a coup with the Defense Brigades, but failed to oust his brother, President Hafez al-Assad.
15. 2025: coup plot by pro-Assad officers within the Syrian Army

== Taiwan ==
1. January 21, 1964: mutiny by General Chao Chih-hwa with the goal of marching on Taipei.

== Tajikistan ==
1. September 7, 1992: Rahmon Nabiyev was held at gunpoint at Dushanbe Airport and forced to resign. Emomali Rahmon assumed internal power in November.
2. 2015: members of the Islamic Renaissance Party of Tajikistan were arrested on charges of plotting a coup.

== Thailand ==
The number of coups in Thailand—whether successful or unsuccessful— is uncertain, leading one academic to call for a concerted effort to make a definitive list.

According to Paul Chambers, a professor at Chiang Mai University's Institute for South-East Asian Affairs, there have been almost 30 coup attempts in Thailand (whether successful or unsuccessful) since 1912. Some count 11 coups since 1932. Others claim there were 13 since 1932.

1. 1912: Coup planned by military officers was discovered and thwarted.
2. June 24, 1932: The Khana Ratsadon party overthrew the absolute monarchy of King Prajadhipok.
3. April 1, 1933: Phraya Manopakorn Nitithada dissolved a government of the People's Party and ousted Pridi Banomyong, the leader of the party, from the country.
4. June 20, 1933: Phraya Phahon Phonphayuhasena overthrew Phraya Manopakorn Nititada.
5. October 11–23, 1933: A royalist rebellion overturned the results of the June 1933 coup d'état.
6. August 3, 1935: The Nai Sip rebellion took place.
7. January 29, 1939: More a purge or internal coup, this was the work of Prime Minister Plaek Phibunsongkhram to remove political enemies and rivals.
8. November 7, 1947: Phin Choonhavan overthrew Thawan Thamrongnawasawat.
9. February 26–27, 1949: An attempted coup by Pridi Banomyong, who saw the Grand Palace occupied by his supporters, failed.
10. June 29, 1951: Pridi supporters in the navy attempted a coup when they tried to seize Phibun.
11. November 29, 1951: The military overthrew the 1949 constitution and reverted to the 1932 constitution.
12. September 21, 1957: Sarit Thanarat overthrew Plaek Phibunsongkhram.
13. October 20, 1958: Sarit Thanarat led a self-coup.
14. November 18, 1971: Thanom Kittikachorn led a self-coup.
15. February 1976: An attempted military coup was defeated in February.
16. October 6, 1976: Sangad Chaloryu overthrew Seni Pramoj.
17. 26 March 1977: attempt by members of the 9th Infantry Division to remove Thanin Kraivichien.
18. October 20, 1977: Kriangsak Chamanan overthrew Thanin Kraivichien.
19. April 1, 1981: A coup led by the army's deputy commander-in-chief failed when forces loyal to the government suppressed the revolt. The "Young Turk" group of officers who staged the coup were dismissed from the army.
20. September 9, 1985: A coup attempt by Colonel Manoonkrit Roopkachorn, a member of the Young Turks, failed and a number of senior officers were later arrested.
21. February 23. 1991: Sunthorn Kongsompong overthrew Chatichai Choonhavan.
22. September 19. 2006: Sonthi Boonyaratglin overthrew Thaksin Shinawatra.
23. May 22, 2014: Prayut Chan-o-cha overthrew Niwatthamrong Boonsongpaisan.

== Togo ==
1. January 13, 1963: Étienne Eyadéma and Emmanuel Bodjollé overthrew Sylvanus Olympio.
2. January 13, 1967: Étienne Eyadéma and Kléber Dadjo overthrew Nicolas Grunitzky.
3. February 5–25, 2005: self coup by Faure Essozimna Gnassingbé, son of former president Gnassingbé Eyadéma.

== Trinidad and Tobago ==
1. July 27 to August 1, 1990: A failed coup attempt by Islamist Jamaat al Muslimeen organization was led by Yasin Abu Bakr against Prime Minister A. N. R. Robinson.

== Tunisia ==
1. July 15, 1957: Habib Bourguiba overthrew King Muhammad VIII al-Amin.
2. November 7, 1987: Zine El Abidine Ben Ali overthrew Habib Bourguiba.
3. Tunisian revolution: A series of street demonstrations that led to the ousting of longtime dictator Zine El Abidine Ben Ali in January 2011.
4. July 25, 2021: President Kais Saied conducted a self-coup by dismissing his prime minister Hichem Mechichi and dissolving the Assembly of the Representatives of the People.

== Tuva ==
1. January 1929: The pro-Soviet, anti-Buddhist faction of the Tuvan People's Revolutionary Party overthrew the government of the Tuvan People's Republic in modern Tuva.

== Turkey ==
=== Ottoman Empire ===
1. 1807–1808: The Janissaries, led by Kabakçı Mustafa, overthrew Sultan Selim III to halt his Nizam-I Cedid reforms after the 1806 Edirne incident, disbanding his new military and replacing him with Mustafa IV. However, rebels led by Mustafa Bayrakdar overthrew the Janissary regime and placed Mahmud II on the throne.
2. May 15, 1826: The Janissaries revolted and attempted to overthrow Sultan Mahmud II in opposition to his military modernizations, but he had the Sipahis force them back to their barracks and then permanently disbanded them.
3. May 30, 1876: Due to the public discontent caused by crop failures, public debt and excessive spending, the thirty-second Sultan of the Ottoman Empire Abdulaziz was deposed by his ministers and found dead several days later, which was attributed to suicide. He was replaced by Murad V.
4. August 31, 1876: Murad V is deposed in favour of his half-brother Abdul Hamid II.
5. May 20, 1878: coup attempt to remove Sultan Abdul Hamid II and restore Murad V.
6. March 31, 1909: Islamist factions in the Ottoman Army attempted to overthrow the new Ottoman General Assembly and restore Sultan Abdülhamit II to absolute rule, capturing control of Constantinople for 11 days. This was suppressed by Mahmud Shevket Pasha's Third Army, forcing the Sultan to abdicate. He is succeeded by Mehmed V.
7. July 17, 1912: The "Saviour Officers" of the opposition Freedom and Accord Party overthrew the Committee of Union and Progress after the rigged 1912 general election.
8. January 23, 1913: The Committee of Union and Progress overthrew Grand Vizier Kâmil Pasha after the First Balkan War, leading to the rule of the "Three Pashas" in the Ottoman Empire.

=== Turkish Republic ===
1. May 27, 1960: A group of mid-ranking Turkish Armed Forces officers, later called the National Unity Committee, overthrew the Democrat Party government led by Prime Minister Adnan Menderes.
2. February 22, 1962: A failed coup attempt was led by Colonel Talât Aydemir due to the discontent by the election results on July 9, 1961.
3. May 20, 1963: A second failed coup attempt was led by officers loyal to Colonel Talât Aydemir who was retired after the previous coup attempt. The plotters were motivated by the purges of army officers that took part in the May 27, 1960 coup. İsmet İnönü's government prevented the coup. Aydemir, who was granted amnesty for the previous attempt, was executed.
4. May 20, 1969: A military intervention took place.
5. March 9, 1971: A coup attempt by leftist army officers was thwarted.
6. March 12, 1971: Under four force commanders, the Turkish Armed Forces overthrew Süleyman Demirel.
7. December 27, 1979: The military memorandum was issued.
8. September 12, 1980: Chief of the General Staff Kenan Evren overthrew the government led by Prime Minister Süleyman Demirel in response to widespread political violence.
9. February 28, 1997: the General Staff issued a memorandum demanding the reversal of several policies of the Islamist government of Necmettin Erbakan, precipitating its collapse. Due to the lack of an overt military takeover, the event is popularly known as the "postmodern coup" (Turkish: Post-modern darbe).
10. April 27, 2007: Amid a political deadlock concerning ongoing presidential elections, the General Staff issued a statement, later called the E-memorandum, about the presidential election understood to be a criticism of the ruling Justice and Development Party's candidate, Abdullah Gül. The crisis was resolved by an early election held later that year, which resulted in Gul winning the presidency in a landslide.
11. July 15, 2016: A group within the Turkish military linked by the Turkish government to the Gülen movement, the Peace at Home Council, made a failed military attempt to overthrow the government of President Recep Tayyip Erdoğan.

== Uganda ==
1. February 1966: Milton Obote overthrew King Mutesa II of Buganda.
2. January 25, 1971: Idi Amin overthrew Milton Obote.
3. March 23–24, 1974: Brigadier Charles Arube attempted to overthrow Idi Amin
4. 18 June 1977: attempted coup by the Uganda Liberation Movement against Idi Amin.
5. May 12, 1980: Paulo Muwanga overthrew Godfrey Binaisa.
6. July 27, 1985: Tito Okello overthrew Milton Obote.
7. January 26, 1986: Yoweri Museveni overthrew Tito Okello.

== Ukraine ==
=== Cossack Hetmanate ===
1. July 23, 1687: Conspirators overthrew and arrested Hetman Ivan Samoylovych, bringing to power Ivan Mazepa as the new Hetman.

=== Ukrainian War of Independence ===
1. April 29, 1918: Pavlo Skoropadskyi overthrew the socialist government of the Central Council of Ukraine.
2. December 14, 1918: Directorate of Ukraine overthrew Pavlo Skoropadskyi.
3. April 29, 1919: A failed attempt by Otaman Volodymyr Oskilko to overthrow Borys Martos and the Directorate of Ukraine took place.
4. December, 1919: A failed plot by Ukrainian Bolsheviks was led by Yevgeny Polonsky to assassinate Nestor Makhno and seize power in the region under Makhnovshchina control.

=== Post-1991 State ===
1. November 26, 2021: Allegations surface of a Russia-backed coup attempt.
2. February 2022: A failed coup was attempted in Ukraine to take control of various Ukrainian cities by pro-Russian rebels, install pro-Russian rule in them and transfer cities to the Russian army during the Russian invasion of Ukraine.
3. July 1, 2024: Ukrainian authorities announced that a pro-Russian coup plot had been foiled.

== United Arab Emirates ==
=== Emirates ===
==== Abu Dhabi ====
1. August 22, 1922: Sultan bin Zayed Al Nahyan killed the Dhabyani ruler Hamdan bin Zayed Al Nahyan in a violent seizure of the throne.
2. August 4, 1926: Saqr bin Zayed Al Nahyan killed the Dhabyani ruler Sultan bin Zayed Al Nahyan in a violent seizure of the throne.
3. January 1, 1928: Khalifa bin Zayed bin Khalifa Al Nahyan, with the support of a Manasir faction, deposed and killed the Dhabyani ruler Saqr bin Zayed Al Nahyan, choosing to install Shakhbut bin Sultan Al Nahyan due to him having British support.
4. 1954–1955: A Saudi-backed coup plot against Shakhbut bin Sultan Al Nahyan, led by Princes Zayed bin Saqr Al Nahyan and Dhabi Diab Al Nahyan, failed to materialize due to the resolution of the Buraimi dispute.
5. August 6, 1966: British forces staged a coup that deposed Shakhbut bin Sultan Al Nahyan and installed Zayed bin Sultan Al Nahyan.
6. 2011: Forces loyal to Khalifa bin Zayed Al Nahyan, ruler of Abu Dhabi and president of the UAE, foiled a coup plot led by Hamdan bin Zayed bin Sultan Al Nahyan.

==== Ajman ====
1. July 8, 1900: Abdulaziz bin Humaid Al Nuaimi overthrew his nephew Humaid bin Rashid Al Nuaimi II.
2. June 20, 1910: Prince Muḥammad bin Rāshid attempted to overthrow his uncle Sheikh ʿAbd al-ʿAzīz bin Ḥumaid. Succeeded in assassinating him, but townspeople expelled the plotters and the throne passed to Ḥumaid III.

==== Dubai ====
1. 1929: Sheikh Maniʿ bin Rashid overthrew ruling Sheikh Saʿīd bin Maktūm with a coalition of disgruntled merchants, however, after 3 days, the arrival of the British warship HMS Triad convinced the merchants to restore Saʿīd.
2. 1938-1939: The Majlis al-Tujjār, a block of merchants and reformists, supported by junior members of the royal family, attempted to establish an elected royal council and removal of the treasury from royal control, attempted to overthrow Sheikh Saʿīd bin Maktūm but would be dissolved by Bedouin and British forces.

==== Ras Al-Khaimah ====
1. July 10, 1948: Sheikh Ṣaqr bin Muḥammad overthrew his uncle Sultan bin Salīm.
2. June 2010: Ex-crown prince Khālid bin Ṣaqr attempted to hire a mercenary army to overthrow Saʿūd bin Ṣaqr and Ṣaqr, foiled by UAE federal forces.

==== Sharjah ====
1. June 24, 1965: British forces staged a coup that deposed Saqr bin Sultan Al Qasimi and installed Khalid bin Muhammad Al Qasimi.
2. January 24–25, 1972: Saqr bin Sultan Al Qasimi attempted and failed to overthrow Khalid bin Muhammad Al Qasimi, killing Khalid in the process.
3. June 17–24, 1987: `Abd al-`Aziz bin Muhammad Al Qasimi attempted and failed to overthrow Sultan bin Muhammad Al-Qasimi.

==== Umm Al-Quwain ====
1. October 13, 1923: Sheikh Ḥamad bin Ibrāhīm overthrew his cousin Abdullāh bin Rāshid II, who was killed by his own household slave.
2. February 9, 1929: Sheikh ʿAbd al-Raḥmān bin Aḥmad overthrew Ḥamad bin Ibrāhīm, but the royal fort would be burned down by townsfolk, who installed Aḥmad bin Rāshid.

=== Federal Government ===
1. 2013: The UAE Federal Government tried 94 people linked to Al Islah for an alleged coup plot.

== United Kingdom ==
=== Kingdom of England ===
1. 1642: During the First English Civil War, a successful Royalist coup in the city of Chichester, Sussex, handed control of the city from the local Parliamentarians instead to the local Royalists who then welcomed Sir Edward Ford's Royalist army into the city. This began the 1642 Royalist invasion of Sussex.

=== Kingdom of Great Britain ===
1. 1722: A plot by Jacobites to overthrow George I and restore the Stuart Dynasty.

=== United Kingdom of Great Britain and Ireland ===
1. 1802: A plan by Edward Despard to assassinate King George III and stage a popular uprising in London was suppressed by the government.
2. 1820: The conspiracy to assassinate Prime Minister Lord Liverpool and his cabinet was intercepted and suppressed in the planning stages.
3. March 1913: During the suffragette bombing and arson campaign, a plot to kidnap Home Secretary Reginald McKenna was revealed and discussed in the House of Commons and in the press. It was revealed that suffragettes were planning to kidnap one or more cabinet ministers and subject them to force-feeding until they conceded women's suffrage. After the plan came to light, it was aborted.
4. 1913: During the suffragette bombing and arson campaign, Special Branch detectives discovered that the WSPU had plans to create a suffragette "army" known as the "People's Training Corps" and informally as "Mrs. Pankhurst's Army". The army was intended to proceed in force to Downing Street to imprison ministers until they conceded women's suffrage. After the discovery of the plans, they were aborted.

== United States ==
=== Prior to independence ===
1. December 21, 1719: Local military officers in colonial South Carolina overthrew the Lords Proprietors.

=== Federal level ===
1. March 1783: The Continental Army may have planned to overthrow the Confederation Congress, but the conspiracy failed after General George Washington refused to join.
2. August 29, 1786: Daniel Shays led a march on the federal Springfield Armory in an unsuccessful attempt to seize its weaponry and overthrow the government. The federal government found itself unable to finance troops to put down the rebellion, and it was consequently put down by the Massachusetts state militia and a privately funded local militia. The widely held view was that the Articles of Confederation needed to be reformed as the country's governing document, and the events of the rebellion served as a catalyst for the Constitutional Convention and the creation of the new government.
3. 1933–1934: A group of businessmen were said to be conspiring to overthrow Franklin D. Roosevelt and install a fascist dictatorship. It allegedly failed when Smedley Butler refused to participate and instead testified before Congress.
4. November 3, 2020 to January 7, 2021: After Joe Biden won the 2020 United States presidential election, President Donald Trump pursued an effort to overturn the election, with support and assistance from his campaign, proxies, political allies, and general public supporters. These efforts culminated in the January 6 United States Capitol attack, during which Trump supporters stormed the Capitol in a failed attempt to stop the Congressional certification of the election. In 2023, the Department of Justice indicted Trump for this. Following Trump's re-election in 2024, the Department of Justice dropped the case without prejudice, citing department norms against prosecuting a sitting president.

=== State level ===
1. 1841–1842: Failed gubernatorial candidate Thomas Wilson Dorr attempted to install a new government of Rhode Island under a different constitution.
2. March 16, 1861: The Texas Legislature deposed governor Sam Houston after he refused to swear allegiance to the Confederate States of America following the secession of Texas from the United States and replaced him with Edward Clark.
3. April 15, 1874: Failed gubernatorial candidate Joseph Brooks launched a coup against Arkansas governor Elisha Baxter, setting off a violent struggle between the state's two Republican Party leaders.
4. September 14, 1874: The White League overthrew the government of Louisiana in New Orleans, holding statehouse, armory, and downtown for three days until the coup was suppressed by the 22nd Infantry Regiment under the Insurrection Act of 1807.
5. October 14, 1931: Lieutenant Governor of Louisiana Paul N. Cyr had himself sworn in as Governor while Governor Huey Long was out of state. Long had been elected to the Senate in 1930 but intended to remain Governor until the end of his term in 1932. Long sent the National Guard to the Governor's mansion and the state Capitol and returned to Baton Rouge to secure his position as governor. Long had Cyr removed as Lieutenant Governor by successfully arguing to the Louisiana Supreme Court that Cyr had vacated the position by swearing himself in as governor.
6. October 8, 2020: The Federal Bureau of Investigation announced the arrests of 13 men suspected of orchestrating a domestic terror plot to kidnap American politician Gretchen Whitmer, the Governor of Michigan, and otherwise using violence to overthrow the state government.

=== Counties and municipalities ===
1. August 16, 1889: After months of retaliatory violence between rival factions of Southern Democrats, a gun battle in Richmond, Texas, killed the incumbent Sheriff of Fort Bend County, triggering martial law in the county and the collapse of its government.
2. November 10, 1898: White-supremacist Southern Democrats overthrew the biracial Fusionist ruling coalition of Wilmington, North Carolina.
3. August 2, 1946: Citizens led by returning World War II veterans overthrew the allegedly corrupt government of McMinn County, Tennessee.

== Uruguay ==
1. February 10, 1898: Juan Lindolfo Cuestas conducted a self-coup.
2. March 31, 1933: Gabriel Terra conducted a self-coup.
3. February 21, 1942: Alfredo Baldomir conducted a self-coup, sometimes known as the Golpe bueno (the "Good coup").
4. June 27, 1973: Juan María Bordaberry closed parliament and established a civic-military dictatorship

== Venezuela ==
1. August 1–2, 1859: Manuel Vicente de las Casas, the military chief of Caracas, arrested President Julián Castro and forced him to resign.
2. August 29, 1861: Conservative officers, led by Pedro José Rojas and José Echezuría, overthrew President Pedro Gual and installed the dictatorship of José Antonio Páez.
3. December 19, 1908: Juan Vicente Gómez declared himself president after Cipriano Castro left for Europe to receive medical treatment.
4. October 18, 1945: President Isaías Medina Angarita was overthrown by a rebellion and a popular movement, which saw a transition to a democratic government.
5. December 11, 1946: A failed coup attempt against President Rómulo Betancourt was led by Lieutenant Colonel Juan Pérez Jiménez.
6. November 24, 1948: A military junta, led by Carlos Delgado Chalbaud, overthrew the democratically elected president Rómulo Gallegos.
7. January 22–23, 1958: Popular unrest and military support achieved the overthrow of the dictatorial government of Marcos Pérez Jiménez, forming a transitional government led by Rear Admiral Wolfgang Larrazábal and Edgar Sanabria.
8. February 4–5, 1992: A failed coup attempt against President Carlos Andrés Pérez was led by Hugo Chávez and his group MBR-200.
9. November 27, 1992: A failed coup in which a group of remnant officers loyal to the Hugo Chávez-led MBR-200 attempted to seize control of the government.
10. April 11–13, 2002: A brief coup against Hugo Chávez was led by the country's military high command during a general strike called by the business federation—Fedecámaras—and the Confederation of Workers of Venezuela.
11. 2019 Venezuelan uprising attempt
12. 3–4 May 2020: attempt by Venezuelan dissidents with aid from American mercenaries to overthrow Nicolás Maduro.

== Vietnam ==
1. October 1459: Emperor Lê Nhân Tông was deposed and killed in a coup led by Lê Nghi Dân.
2. May 1460: A coup against emperor Lê Nghi Dân failed.
3. June 6, 1460: Emperor Lê Nghi Dân was deposed (and possibly killed) in a coup by officials, who elevated Lê Thánh Tông to the throne.
4. November 1509: Emperor Lê Uy Mục was deposed in a coup led by Lê Tương Dực.
5. Spring 1516: Emperor Lê Tương Dực was deposed in a military coup in favor of his nephew Lê Chiêu Tông.
6. 1524: Emperor Lê Chiêu Tông fled the capital due to a rebellion. General Mạc Đăng Dung quashed the rebellion, seized the opportunity to stage a coup against the emperor (who was killed by Mạc's supporters soon after), and raised his brother Lê Cung Hoàng to the throne.
7. June 15, 1527: Emperor Lê Cung Hoàng, the puppet of general Mạc Đăng Dung, was deposed and executed in a military coup by Mạc, who proclaimed himself the emperor of his own new Mạc dynasty. This led to the Lê–Mạc War (1527/1533–1592).
8. March 9 to May 15, 1945: With Japanese forces losing the war and the threat of an Allied invasion of Indochina imminent, the Japanese took control from the French colonial administration, concerned about an uprising against them by French colonial forces.

=== South Vietnam ===
1. 1960: Lieutenant-Colonel Vương Văn Đông and Colonel Nguyễn Chánh Thi of the Airborne Division of the Army of the Republic of Vietnam failed to depose of President Ngo Dinh Diem.
2. 1963: General Dương Văn Minh led a group of Army of the Republic of Vietnam officers to oust President Ngo Dinh Diem in response to Ngo's handling of the Buddhist crisis.
3. January 1964: General Nguyễn Khánh ousted the military junta led by General Dương Văn Minh in a bloodless coup.
4. September 1964: Generals Lâm Văn Phát and Dương Văn Đức failed to overthrow the ruling military junta led by General Nguyễn Khánh. The attempt collapsed without any casualties.
5. December 1964: The ruling military junta, led by General Nguyễn Khánh dissolved the High National Council.
6. 1965: Army units commanded by General Lâm Văn Phát and Colonel Phạm Ngọc Thảo fought to a stalemate with those of the ruling military junta, led by General Nguyễn Khánh. Following this, however, General Nguyễn Cao Kỳ and Air Marshal Nguyễn Chánh Thi (hostile to both the plotters and to Khánh himself) seized power themselves with the backing of the United States. They then forced Khánh into exile.

== Yemen ==
=== North Yemen ===
1. 1948: The al-Waziri family assassinated Imam Yahya of the Mutawakkilite Kingdom of Yemen.
2. 1955: A failed coup in which soldiers led by Colonel Ahmad Yahya al-Thulaya attempted to overthrow Imam Ahmad bin Yahya.
3. September 26, 1962: Septembrist officers, led by Abdullah al-Sallal, deposed Imam al-Badr and replaced the monarchy with a republic. This coup led to the North Yemen civil war.
4. November 5, 1967: A group of army officers and tribal sheikhs overthrew Abdullah al-Sallal, and brought Abdul Rahman al-Eryani to power.
5. June 13, 1974: Ibrahim al-Hamdi overthrew Abdul Rahman al-Eryani.
6. October 15, 1978: A failed coup in which Yemeni Nasserists attempted to overthrow Ali Abdullah Saleh.

=== South Yemen ===
1. June 22, 1969: A left-wing faction of the National Front, led by Abdul Fattah Ismail and Salim Rubaya Ali, deposed Qahtan Muhammad al-Shaabi and placed him under house.
2. June 26, 1978: Abdul Fattah Ismail overthrew and executed Salim Rubaya Ali.
3. 1986: A failed coup d'etat in which Ali Nasir Muhammad attempted to overthrow Abdul Fattah Ismail.

=== United Yemen ===
1. 2014–2015: A semi-successful coup against President Abdrabbuh Mansur Hadi was led by the Houthis.
2. 2018: A coup was led by the Southern Movement.

== Yugoslavia ==
1. January 6, 1929: Alexander I of Yugoslavia suspended the constitution and introduced a personal dictatorship (self-coup).
2. 1941: King Peter II of Yugoslavia led a coup against Regent Prince Paul of Yugoslavia in reaction for joining the Axis Powers, leading to an Axis invasion.

== Zanzibar ==
1. January 12, 1964: John Okello led the coup to overthrow Sultan Jamshid bin Abdullah Al Said.

== Zambia ==
1. July 1, 1990: Mwamba Luchembe unsuccessfully attempted to overthrow President Kenneth Kaunda.
2. October 28, 1997: Steven Lungu failed to overthrow President Frederick Chiluba.

== Zimbabwe ==
=== Southern Rhodesia ===
1. 1965: Following the colonial government's Unilateral Declaration of Independence, the colonial governor dismissed the government, but the government ignored this and instead replaced the governor with an "Officer Administering the Government."
2. February 14, 1980: A planned coup to overthrow Robert Mugabe was canceled.

=== Zimbabwe ===
1. June 2 or June 15, 2007: A plot was alleged to have taken place to overthrow Robert Mugabe.
2. November 14, 2017: A coup resulted in the removal of longtime President Robert Mugabe.

== See also ==
- List of coups and coup attempts – chronological listing
- List of coups and coup attempts since 2010
- List of revolutions and rebellions
- Self-coup
- Soft coup

== Bibliography ==
- Groenveld, Simon; Leeuwenberg, Huib L. Ph; Weel, Heleen B. van der (2009). Unie, Bestand, Vrede: drie fundamentale wetten van de Republiek der Verenigde Nederlanden [Union, Truce, Peace: three fundamental laws of the Republic of the United Netherlands] (in Dutch). Hilversum: Verloren. ISBN 978-90-8704-127-4.
- Kosterman, Hans (2000). "De Unie van Utrecht" [The Union of Utrecht]. In Velema, Willem (ed.). Het aanzien van een millennium: kroniek van historische gebeurtenissen van de Lage Landen 1000-2000 [The appearance of a millennium: chronicle of historical events of the Low Countries 1000-2000] (in Dutch) (2nd ed.). Utrecht: Het Spectrum. pp. 61–63. ISBN 978-90-274-6844-4.
- Ooi, Keat Gin (2004). Ooi, Keat Gin (ed.). Southeast Asia: a historical encyclopedia from Angkor Wat to East Timor. Santa Barbara/Cal: ABC-Clio. ISBN 978-1-57607-770-2.
