= Ministry of Environment and Quality of Life (Algeria) =

Algerian government ministry

- وزارة البيئة وجودة الحياة; Ministère de l'Environnement et de la Qualité de la vie

Agency overview
- Headquarters: Rue des Quatre Canons, Alger-Centre, Algiers
- Minister responsible: Kaoutar Krikou, Minister
- Website: www.me.gov.dz

The Ministry of Environment and Quality of Life is an Algerian government ministry that is responsible for pollution prevention, biodiversity, climate change, the green and circular economy, and quality-of-life measurement. Its current name has been in use since 18 November 2024. Before that, it was the Ministry of Environment and Renewable Energies. Its current minister is Kaoutar Krikou, since September 2025.

== History ==
According to the ministry, environmental affairs were first handled by the National Environment Committee, formed in 1974. In 1977, environment was placed under the Ministry of Agriculture, then in 1983, the National Agency for Environmental Protection was created. Environment was placed under Irrigation in 1984, moved to Interior and Environment in 1988, then the position became a minister delegate for research, technology, and environment in 1990. In 1992, it was placed under Universities. In 1993, it moved to Interior, Local Authorities, and Environment. Between 2015 and 2017, it was grouped with water resources as the Ministry of Water Resources and Environment.

In 2017, it became Environment and Renewable Energies. In June 2020, renewable energies were moved to a new Ministry of Energy Transition and Renewable Energies, and it became the Ministry of Environment. Renewable energies returned to it in September 2022. On 18 November 2024, it became Environment and Quality of Life.

== Mandate ==
According to Decree 25-104 issued on 24 March 2025, the minister's responsibilities include for green and circular economy; pollution prevention, biodiversity, ozone, climate change and carbon footprint, and the greenhouse gas inventory; ecosystems protection; quality of life including citizen-satisfaction measurement and an annual performance report; and international conventions.

== Organization ==
Decree 25–105, also issued on 24 March 2025, organizes the ministry, setting up an inspectorate general for environment and a directorate general for environment and sustainable development covering policy, preservation, climate change, and carbon footprint.

Additionally, it set up directorates for quality of life, regulation, studies, digitization and information systems, cooperation and partnership, and general administration.

== Legislation and programs ==
On 20 February 2025, Law 25-02 was issued, amending the 2001 waste law. It covers a national waste strategy and digital waste management system, extended producer responsibility, eco-design, gradual phase-out of single-use plastic, and tougher penalties on violators.

Krikou launched the national integrated waste management program at Ouled Djellal on 25 November 2025, aimed at local elected officials and waste treatment companies.

The ministry held a national meeting on quality of life with the United Nations Development Programme on 21 December 2025, at the end of which a national quality-of-life commission was to be installed.

== Ministers ==
Minister	Title	Took office	Left office	Government	Ref
Fatma Zohra Zerouati	Minister of Environment and Renewable Energies	25 May 2017	2 January 2020	Tebboune, Ouyahia, Bedoui	
Nassira Benharrats	Minister of Environment and Renewable Energies (2020); Minister of Environment (2020–2021)	2 January 2020	21 February 2021	Djerad I, II	
Dalila Boudjemaa	Minister of Environment	21 February 2021	7 July 2021	Djerad III	
Samia Moualfi	Minister of Environment (2021–2022); Minister of Environment and Renewable Energies (2022–2023)	7 July 2021	16 March 2023	Benabderrahmane	
Fazia Dahleb	Minister of Environment and Renewable Energies	16 March 2023	18 November 2024	Benabderrahmane, Larbaoui I	
Nadjiba Djilali	Minister of Environment and Quality of Life	18 November 2024	14 September 2025	Larbaoui II	
Kaoutar Krikou	Minister of Environment and Quality of Life	14 September 2025	Incumbent	Ghrieb	

== See also ==
- Ministry of Water Resources and Environment
- Cabinet of Algeria
- Climate change in Algeria
