= Climate change in the Middle East and North Africa =

Emissions, impacts and responses of the MENA region related to climate change

Climate classification maps for the Middle East at present (top) and predicted for North Africa for 2071–2100 under the most intense climate change scenario (bottom). Mid-range scenarios are currently considered more likely.

In 2018, the MENA region emitted 3.2 billion tonnes of carbon dioxide and produced 8.7% of global greenhouse gas emissions (GHG). These emissions are mostly from the energy sector, an integral component of many Middle Eastern and North African economies due to the extensive oil and natural gas reserves that are found within the region. The Middle East region is one of the most vulnerable to climate change. The impacts include an increase in drought conditions, aridity, heatwaves and sea level rise.

Sharp global temperature and sea level changes, shifting precipitation patterns and increased frequency of extreme weather events are some of the main impacts of climate change as identified by the Intergovernmental Panel on Climate Change (IPCC). The MENA region is especially vulnerable to such impacts due to its arid and semi-arid environment, facing climatic challenges such as low rainfall, high temperatures and dry soil. The climatic conditions that foster such challenges for MENA are projected by the IPCC to worsen throughout the 21st century. If greenhouse gas emissions are not significantly reduced, part of the MENA region risks becoming uninhabitable before the year 2100.

Climate change is expected to put significant strain on already scarce water and agricultural resources within the MENA region, threatening the national security and political stability of all included countries. Over 60 percent of the region's population lives in high and very high water-stressed areas compared to the global average of 35 percent. This has prompted some MENA countries to engage with the issue of climate change on an international level through environmental accords such as the Paris Agreement. Law and policy are also being established on a national level amongst MENA countries, with a focus on the development of renewable energies.

== Greenhouse gas emissions ==
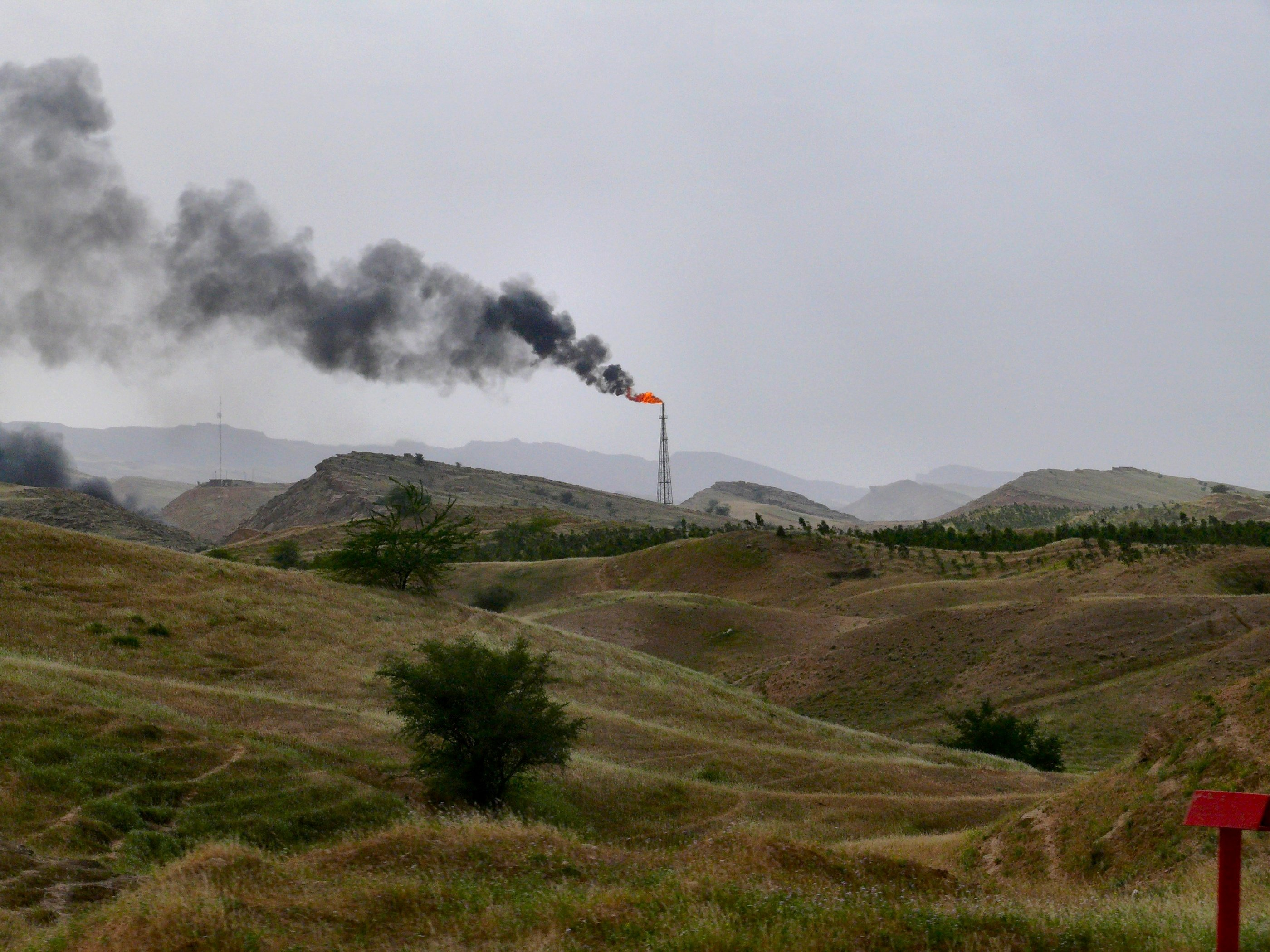
Green house gases being emitted from a chimney in a natural gas and oil field in Western Iran

As of January 2021, the UNICEF website groups the following set of 20 countries as belonging to the MENA region: 'Algeria, Bahrain, Djibouti, Egypt, Iran (Islamic Republic of), Iraq, Jordan, Kuwait, Lebanon, Libya, Morocco, Oman, Qatar, Saudi Arabia, State of Palestine, Sudan, Syrian Arab Republic, Tunisia, United Arab Emirates, Yemen.' Others include Israel as well.

Greenhouse gas emissions produced by humans have been identified by the IPCC and the vast majority of climate scientists as the primary driver of climate change. In the past three decades, the MENA region has more than tripled its greenhouse gas emissions and is currently emitting above the global average per person, with most of the top ten countries by carbon dioxide emissions per person being found in the Middle East. These high emissions levels can be primarily attributed to Saudi Arabia and Iran, which are the 9th and 7th largest emitters of CO_{2} in the world, accounting for 40% of the region's emissions in 2018. MENA countries heavily rely on fossil fuels for the generation of electricity, sourcing 97% of their energy from oil, natural gas, and coal (in Turkey). Fossil fuel extraction, production and exportation is also a significant component of many economies within the MENA region, which possesses 60% of the world oil reserves and 45% of known natural gas reserves. Reducing gas flaring would help.

The failure of the Iranian subsidy reform plan during the 2010s left Iran as the world's largest subsidizer of fossil fuel in 2018. But, unlike other countries which successfully removed subsidies by acting gradually, at the end of the decade, the government attempted to suddenly reduce gasoline subsidies, sparking riots.

== Impacts on the natural environment ==
=== Temperature and weather changes ===
==== Heat extremes ====
The IPCC project average global temperatures to rise more than 1.5 degrees by the end of the 21st century. MENA has been identified as a hotspot for future temperature changes due to its arid environmental conditions. Whilst projected rates of warming during winter months are low, the region is expected to experience extreme temperature increases during summer. Temperature rises are expected to be further amplified by reductions in rainfall and the associated depletion of soil moisture, limiting evaporative cooling. As a result, heat extremes are expected to increase significantly in both frequency and intensity across the MENA region. According to studies published by the Max Planck Institute for Chemistry, the number of very hot days in the region has doubled between the 1970s and the time when the report was published (2016). The study further projects that heatwaves will occur for 80 days of the year by 2050 and 118 days of the year by 2100. Considering also increased sandstorms associated with longer drought periods, even a 2 degree temperature rise would make large parts of the region uninhabitable and force people to migrate. Limiting temperature rise to 1.5 degrees, will significantly reduce risks for the region.

The average maximum temperature during the hottest days of the past 30 years has been 43 degrees Celsius. Dutch atmospheric chemist Johannes Lelieveld has projected that temperature maximum's could reach almost 50 degrees Celsius under current climate scenarios established by the IPCC. Johannes Lelieveld further projects that average summer temperatures are expected to increase by up to 7% across the MENA region, and up to 10% in highly urbanised areas. Extreme heat has been identified as a serious threat to human health, heightening an individual's susceptibility to exhaustion, heart attack and mortality. Climate scientist Ali Ahmadalipour has projected heat-related mortality rates within the MENA region to be up to 20 times higher than current rates by the end of the century.

Köppen-Geiger climate classification maps of MENA in the present (1991-2020) and in the future (2071-2099) under medium emissions<ref&gt;Beck, Hylke E.; McVicar, Tim R.; Vergopolan, Noemi; Berg, Alexis; Lutsko, Nicholas J.; Dufour, Ambroise; Zeng, Zhenzhong; Jiang, Xin; van Dijk, Albert I. J. M.; Miralles, Diego G. (2023-10-23). "High-resolution (1 km) Köppen-Geiger maps for 1901–2099 based on constrained CMIP6 projections". Scientific Data. 10 (1): 724. doi:10.1038/s41597-023-02549-6. ISSN 2052-4463. PMC 10593765.</ref&gt;

Köppen–Geiger climate classification map at 1-km resolution for Western Asia (1991–2020)

Köppen–Geiger climate classification map at 1-km resolution for Western Asia (2071–2099) under medium emissions shared socio-economic pathway (SSP) 2-4.5

Köppen–Geiger climate classification map at 1-km resolution for Northern Africa (1991–2020)

Köppen–Geiger climate classification map at 1-km resolution for Northern Africa (2071–2099) under medium emissions shared socio-economic pathway (SSP) 2-4.5

=== Water resources ===
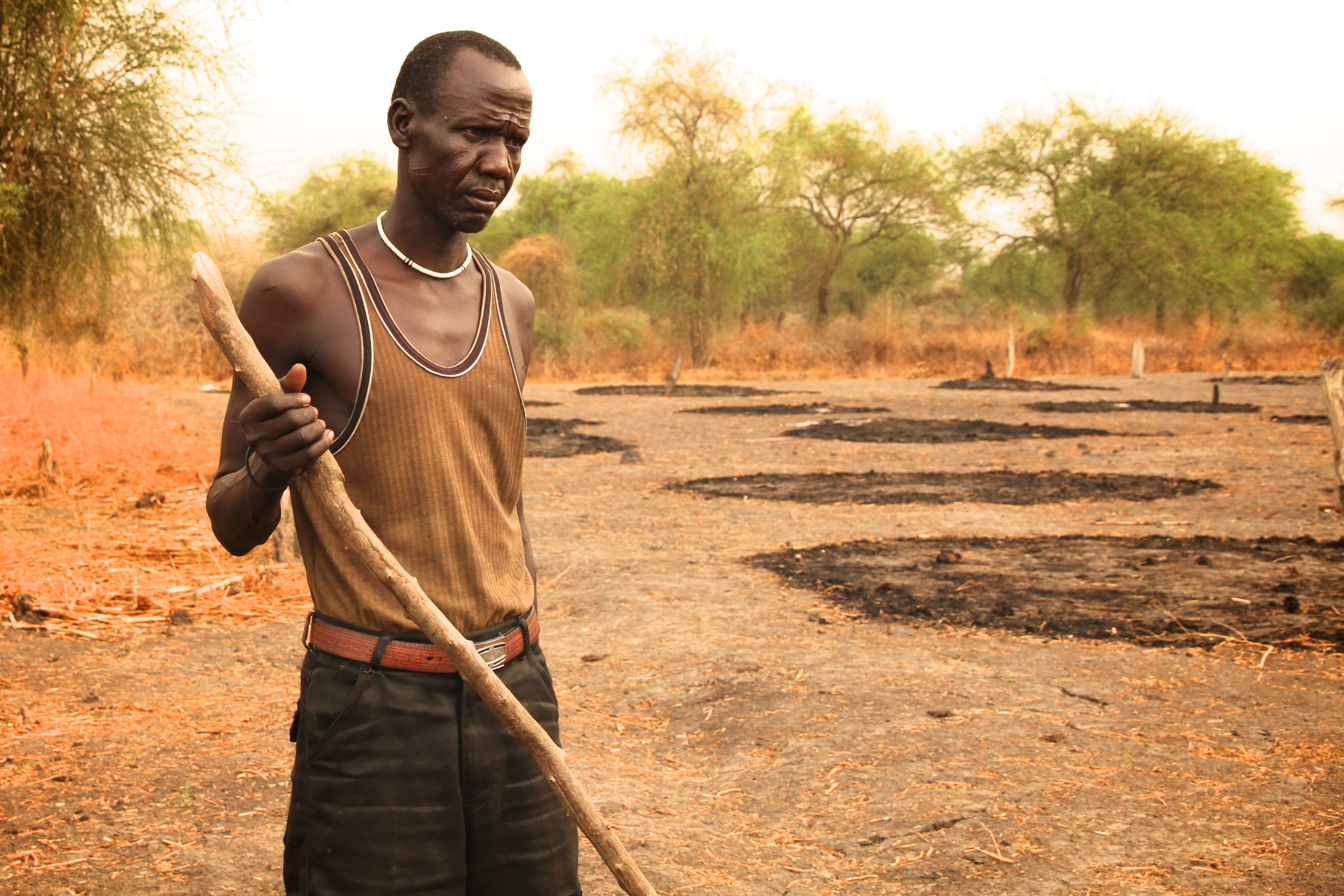
A Sudanese farmer and his land. Drought and low rainfall has severely reduced the farmer's capacity to grow crops.

The Middle East and North Africa currently faces extreme water scarcity, with twelve out of the 17 most water stressed countries in the world deriving from the region. The World Bank defines an area as being water stressed when per person water supplies fall below 1,700 cubic metres per year. The water supply across the MENA region is averaged at 1274 cubic metres per capita, with some countries having access to only 50 cubic metres per person. The agricultural sector within the MENA region is heavily dependent on irrigation systems due to its arid climate, with 85% of fresh water resources being utilised for agricultural purposes. The IPCC indicate that the global distribution of rainfall is currently shifting in response to increasing greenhouse gas emissions, with increases in high latitude and mid-latitude wet region and decreases in equatorial dry regions such as the MENA. These shifting precipitation patterns have already placed significant strain on MENA agriculture, with the frequency and severity of droughts rising significantly in the past decade.

A recent NASA study suggests that the 1998–2012 drought in the Middle East was the worst to occur in the past 900 years. Climate scientist Colin Kelley suggests that climate change was a significant contributor to the increased severity of the most recent drought in the region. He claims that such drought is 3 times more likely to occur due to human influence on climate and the drought have contributed to the beginning of the Syrian civil war. Along with environmental impacts, increasing drought periods affect agricultural incomes, diminishes public health and weakens political stability in the MENA region. Syria experienced its most severe drought on record from 2007 to 2010, where restricted water supply degraded agricultural resources and increased economic pressures. American environmental scientist Peter Gleick also asserts that heightened social vulnerability and conflict over scare water supplies during this period catalysed the onset of the Syrian war.

However, in 2017, a study led by sociologist and political ecologist Jan Selby has discredited these claims, reporting that there is no solid evidence that climate change is associated with the drought, the same about the impact of the drought on the conflict in Syria. In 2019 Konstantin Ash and Nick Obradovich published research indicating that extreme drought was one of the leading factors in the creation of the Syrian war.

Increasing water insecurity as a result of climate change is set to exacerbate existing food insecurities in the countries affected. A study published by the World Food Programme has predicted a decline in crop yields by 30% in 2050 as a result of increasing droughts. North African countries are highly vulnerable to reduced precipitation, as 88% of the region's crops possess no irrigation, relying on consistent rainfall. The consequences of these reduced harvests strongly impact rural regions and communities that rely heavily on agriculture as a source of income.

=== Sea level rise ===
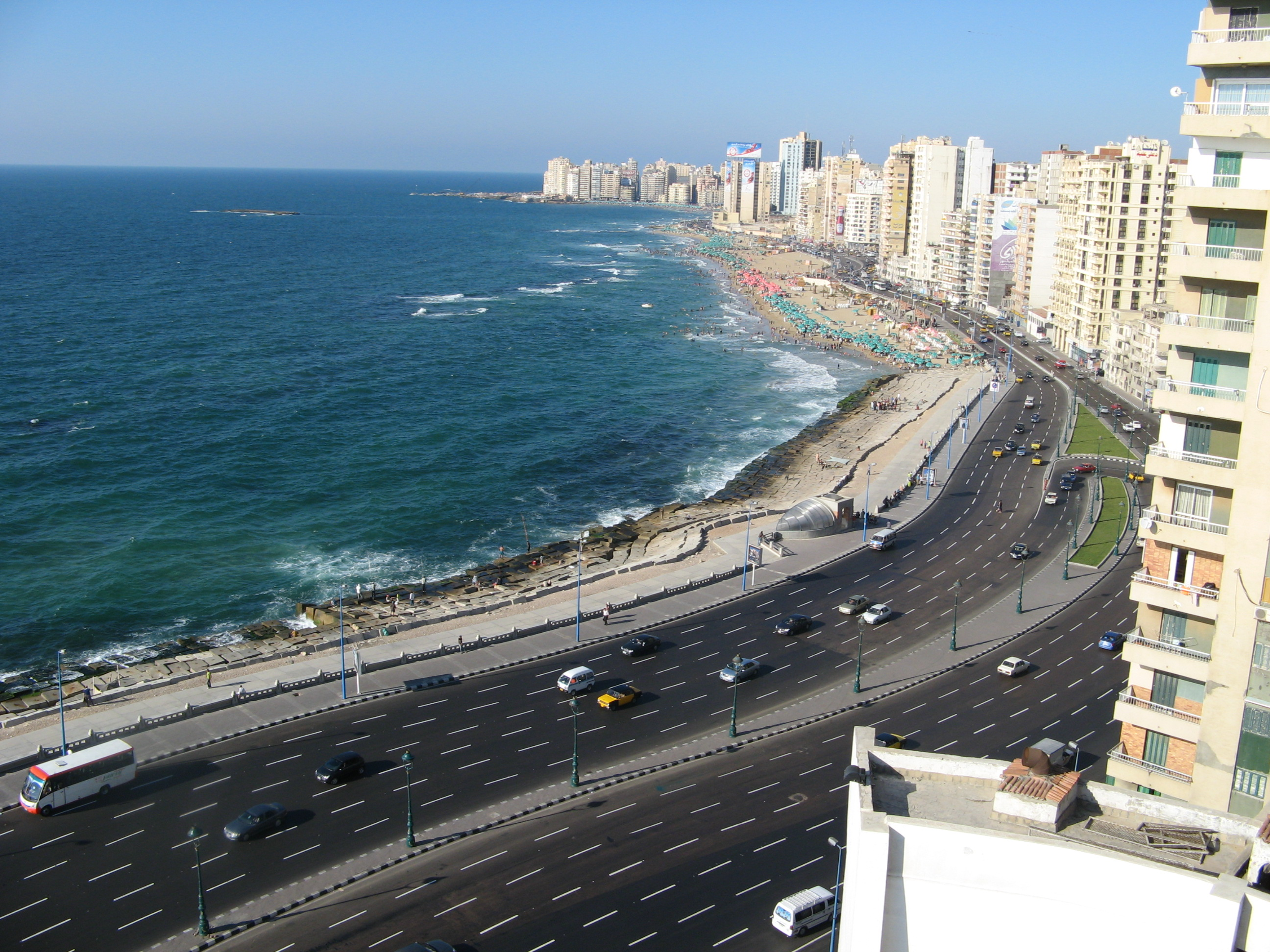
The coastline of Alexandria, Egypt's 2nd largest city

Alexandria is one of the most vulnerable cities to sea level rise.

Across the MENA region, 60 million people inhabited coastal areas in 2010, a population that has been predicted by the World Bank to grow to 100 million by 2030. As a result, the population of the MENA region is expected to be significantly impacted by sea level rise occurring due to climate change. One consequence of rising sea levels is the loss of coastal wetlands, a natural resource responsible for ecosystem services such as storm buffering, water quality maintenance and carbon sequestration. A study conducted by the World Bank predicts that the MENA region would lose over 90% of its coastal and freshwater wetlands if a one-metre sea level rise were to occur.

In North Africa, Egypt is expected to be most affected by changes in sea level. A third of the Nile Delta and large parts of Alexandria, Egypt's second-largest city, lie below the mean global sea level. These areas have been drained for agricultural purposes and undergone urban development, where inundation and flooding is prevented by sea walls and dams. However, failures occurring in these structures, storm surges and extreme weather events could lead to the inundation of these areas in the future if sea levels continue to rise. Agricultural areas in Egypt are particularly at risk, where a one-metre rise in sea level would submerge 12–15% of the nation's total agricultural land. This is estimated to displace 6.7 million people in Egypt and affect millions more who rely on agriculture for income. A more moderate 50 cm increase in sea level has been projected to displace 2 million people and generate US$35 billion of damages.

== Mitigation and adaptation ==
The severe impacts of climate change on the region, made climate change mitigation and adaptation an important issue in it. Regional cooperation is considered as one of the main conditions for effective mitigation and adaptation.

=== Renewable energy ===
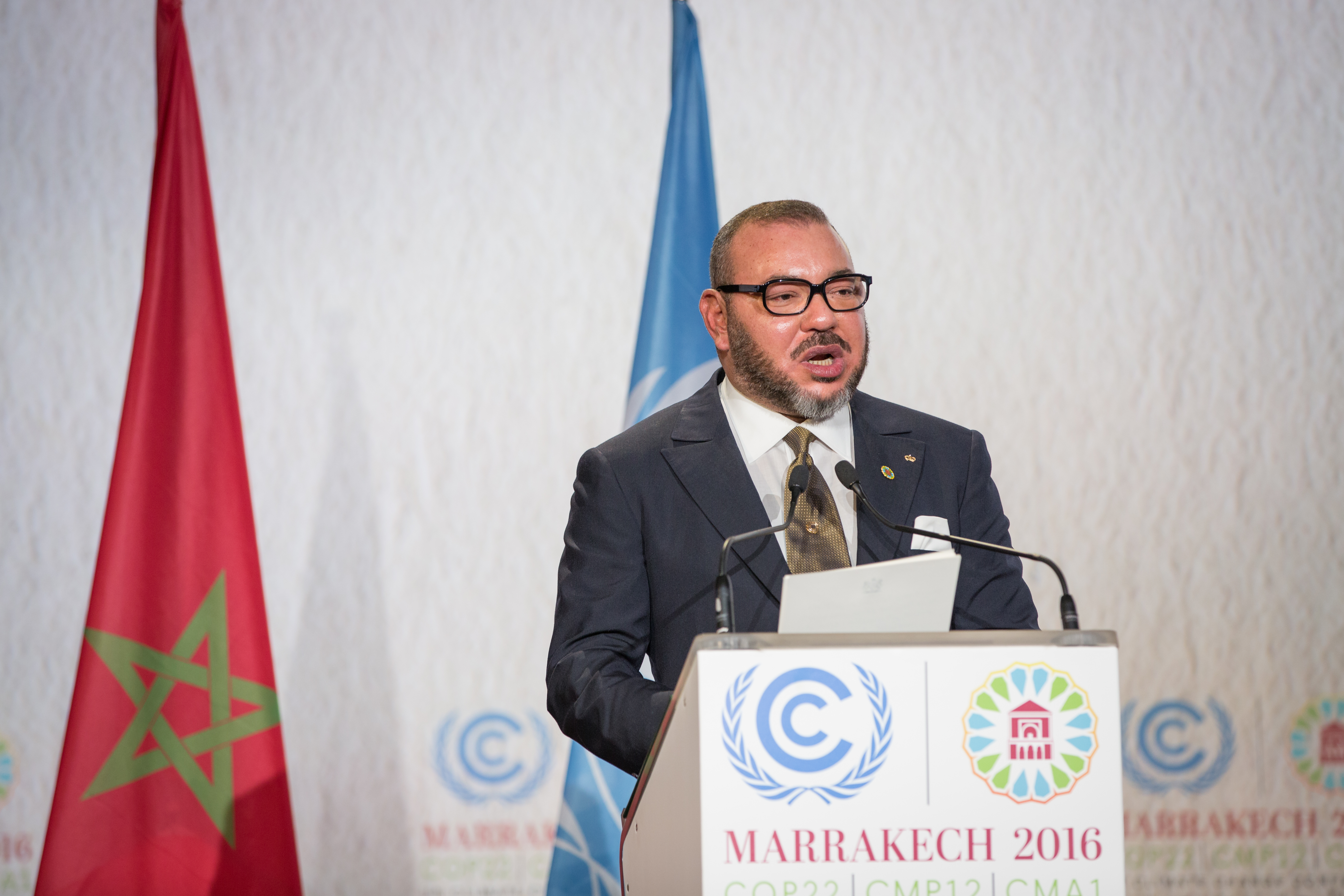
Mohammed VI of Morocco speaking at the COP22 climate summit held in Marrakech

The MENA region possesses high potential for developing renewable energy technologies due to the high levels of wind and sunshine that are associated with its climate. The International Renewable Energy Agency (IRENA) has identified over half of all land in GCC states as being suitable for the deployment of solar and wind technologies. IRENA has also identified North African countries as having greater potential for wind and solar energy generation than all other regions of the continent. Sourcing energy from renewable technologies instead of fossil fuels could significantly reduce energy related GHG emissions, which presently account for 85% of total emissions within the MENA region. Renewable energy generation also involves significantly less water usage than processes associated with fossil fuel extraction and its conversion into usable energy, possessing the potential to improve water quality and availability within the region. Renewable energy presently accounts for 1% of the total primary energy supply across the MENA region.

At the 2016 UN Climate Change Conference in Marrakech, Morocco (COP22), Morocco, Tunisia, Yemen, Lebanon and the State of Palestine, along with 43 other countries, committed to deriving all energy from renewable resources by 2050.

==== Ouarzazate Solar Power Station ====
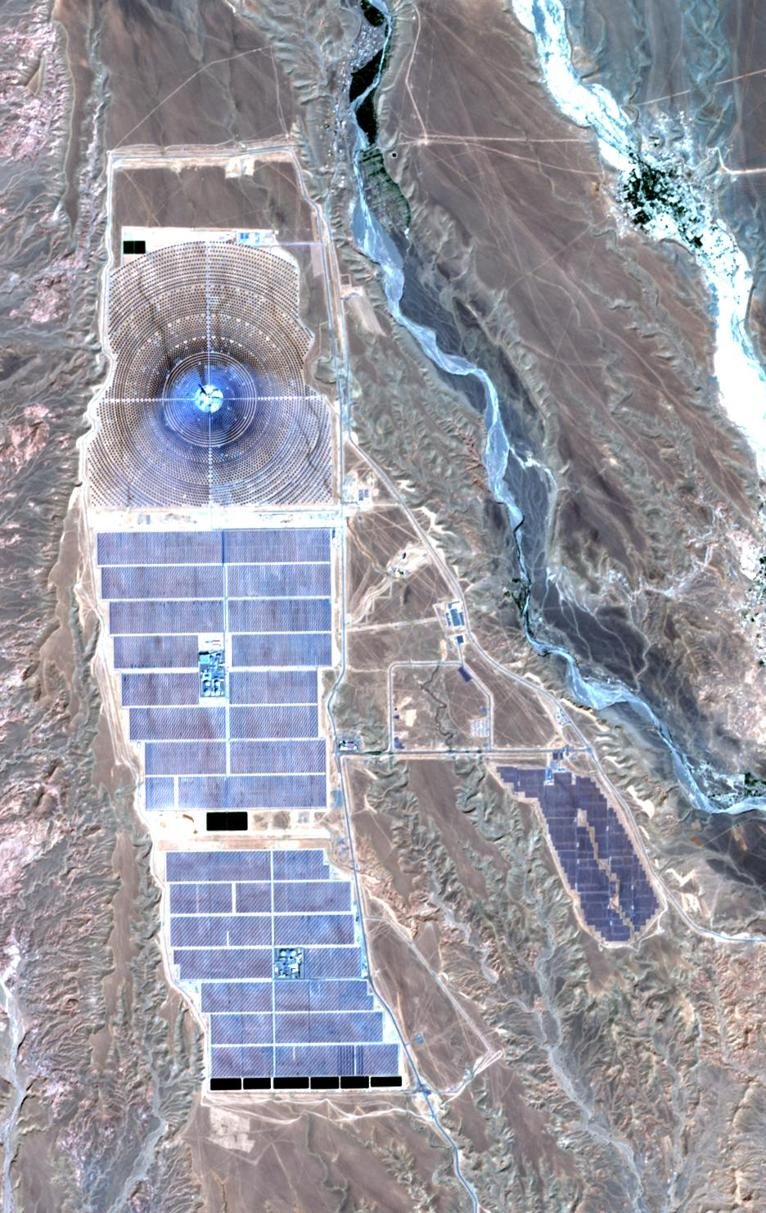
Ouarzazate Solar Power Station, Morocco

The Ouarzazate Solar Power Station is a solar power complex located in the Drâa-Tafilalet region of Morocco, and is currently the largest concentrated solar power plant in the world. The complex consists of four separate power plants that utilise concentrated solar power and photovoltaic solar technology. The project, costing US$2.67 billion, is expected to provide 1.1 million Moroccans with clean energy and reduce the country's carbon emissions by 700,000 tonnes every year. The total energy capacity of the solar plant is expected to reach 2000 Megawatts by the end of 2020.

=== Policies and legislation ===
==== Paris Agreement ====
Countries which have not ratified the Paris Agreement shown in yellow

Eleven countries from the MENA region attended the 21st Conference of the Parties of the UNFCCC where countries negotiated the Paris Agreement, an agreement with the United Nations concerning greenhouse gas emissions mitigation. As of 2021 Eritrea, Iran, Iraq, Libya, and Yemen are the only countries in the world which have not ratified the agreement. Morocco has set its nationally determined contribution to a 17%-42% reduction in emissions and has set a target of having 52% of renewable energy in its total installed electricity production capacity by 2050. The share of renewable energy reached 28% in 2018 and is currently recognised by the United Nations as being on track to achieving its renewable energy targets. The UAE, despite ratifying the agreement, delayed for a number of years in setting reductions. The UAE's climate targets and policies have been described as "insufficient." This indicates that the UAE’s climate policies and commitments need substantial improvements to be consistent with the Paris Agreement’s 1.5 °C temperature limit.

==== MENA Climate Action Plan ====
In 2016 the World Bank put forth the MENA Climate Action Plan, a series of financial commitments centred around the redistribution of finance to the MENA region. The World Bank deemed the plan's core focus to be ensuring food and water security, increasing resilience to climate change impacts and improving investment in renewable energy source. One of the Action Plan's major commitments was to allocate 18-30% of MENA finance towards climate related initiatives, which currently stands a $1.5 billion annually. The World Bank have also outlined a significant increase in funding directed towards adaptation initiatives such as water conservation and recycling, introduction of desalination facilities and investment into carbon sequestration technologies.

== By country ==
=== Algeria ===
Topographic Map Locator map

Climate change in Algeria has wide-reaching effects on the country. Algeria was not a significant contributor to climate change, but, like other countries in the Middle East and North Africa (MENA) region, is expected to be among the most affected by climate change impacts. Because a large part of the country is in already hot and arid geographies, including part of the Sahara, already strong heat and water resource access challenges are expected to get worse. As early as 2014, scientists were attributing extreme heat waves to climate change in Algeria. Algeria was ranked 46th of countries in the 2020 Climate Change Performance Index.

=== Egypt ===
Egypt's Nile Delta is impacted by saltwater intrusion caused by sea level rise, leading to major implications for the country. Agriculture and food security in Egypt will be disrupted by climate change due to increased drought, higher temperatures, extreme weather events, plant diseases and pests, with major infrastructure changes required to adapt. Water security in Egypt will also be disrupted.

=== Iran ===
Lake Urmia has shrunk due to reduced inflow in recent decades. This is attributable to climate change, and contributes to water scarcity in Iran.

Iran is among the most vulnerable countries to climate change in the Middle East and North Africa (MENA). Iran contributes to about 1.8% of global greenhouse gas emissions (GHG), and is ranked 8th in greenhouse gas emissions (GHG) world wide and is ranked first in the MENA region due to its reliance on oil and natural gas. Climate change has led to reduced precipitation as well as increased temperatures, with Iran holding the hottest temperature recorded in Asia.

The country is facing water shortages with around 35% of Iranians experiencing water scarcity. These issues are exacerbated by rapid urbanization which has led to worsened air quality and heat islands. Iran did not sign nor ratify the Paris Agreement.

Iran's regional climates vary from the hot, arid deserts in the south and east to cooler, milder conditions along the Caspian Sea in the north, and temperate climates in the western-south Zagros Basin and southern coastal areas. This diversity contributes to a range of natural hazards, including floods, landslides, and droughts.

=== Iraq ===
Geography of Iraq
- Continent: Asia
- Region: Middle East
- Coordinates: 33 00 N, 44 00 E
- Area: Ranked 58
  - Total: 438,317 km^{2} (169,235 sq mi)
- Coastline: 58 km (36 mi)
- Borders: Turkey to the north, Iran to the east, the Persian Gulf and Kuwait to the southeast, Saudi Arabia to the south, Jordan to the southwest, and Syria to the west.
- Highest point: Cheekha Dar; 3,611 m (11,847 ft)
- Lowest point: Persian Gulf; 0 m (0.0 ft)
- Longest river: Euphrates
- Largest lake: Lake Tharthar
- Natural resources: Petroleum, sulfur, phosphate, and natural gas.

In Iraq, climate change has led to environmental impacts such as increasing temperatures, decreasing precipitation, land degradation, and water scarcity. Climate change poses numerous risks to human health, livelihoods, political stability, and the sustainable development of the nation. The combination of ecological factors, conflict, weak governance, and an impeded capacity to mitigate climate change, has made Iraq uniquely at risk to the negative effects of climate change, with the UN ranking them the 5th most vulnerable country to climate change. Rising temperatures, intensified droughts, declining precipitation, desertification, salinization, and the increasing prevalence of dust storms are challenges Iraq faces due in to the negative impacts of climate change. National and regional political instability and conflict have made it difficult to mitigate the effects of climate change, address transnational water management, and develop sustainably in Iraq. Climate change has negatively impacted Iraq's population through loss of economic opportunity, food insecurity, water scarcity, and displacement.

Water-related challenges are at the forefront of Iraq's environmental problems. Models predict that precipitation will decrease by 9% and mean annual temperatures will increase by 2 °C by 2050. The flow of the Tigris and Euphrates rivers, which provide 98% of Iraq's surface water, has decreased by 30-40% in the past 40 years. The water resources of these two rivers are also shared with neighboring countries. Iraq's water supplies have significantly decreased over time due to dam construction from upstream nations.

In 2019 Iraq contributed 0.5% to global carbon emissions. Iraq's energy sector and fugitive emissions account for three-fourths of the nation's emissions. Specifically, Iraq's oil and gas sectors produced 9% of global methane emissions in 2019, a portion of which is from gas flares. The waste, industrial, and agriculture sectors are the other sectors contributing to Iraq's greenhouse gas emissions.

Iraq produced an Intended Nationally Determined Contribution (INDC), which is a set of policies and goals for how Iraq can address climate change. Iraq wants to reduce emissions by 15% by 2035, with a specific focus on lowering their methane emissions. Iraq ratified the Paris Treaty in 2021 and committed to specific actions to reduce methane emissions in the oil and gas sector, which are coordinated by a newly established inter-ministerial national task force on methane emissions.

=== Israel ===
According to the Ministry of Environmental Protection of Israel: "While Israel is a relatively small contributor to climate change due to its size and population, it is sensitive to the potential impacts of the phenomenon, due to its location. Thus, it is making an effort to reduce greenhouse gas emissions while simultaneously doing whatever possible to reduce the expected damage that will result if climate change is not halted."

The impacts of climate change are already felt in Israel. The temperature rose by 1.4 degrees between 1950 and 2017. The number of hot days increased and the number of cold days decreased. Precipitation rates have fallen. The trends are projected to continue. By the year 2050, in the coastal area the number of days with maximal temperature above 30 degrees, per year, is projected to increase by 20 in the scenario with climate change mitigation and by 40 in "business as usual" scenario.

Israel ratified the Paris Agreement in 2016. The country is part of 3 initiatives on mitigation and adaptation and 16 other actions taken by non-governmental organisations.

According to Israel's Intended nationally determined contribution the main mitigation target is to reduce per capita greenhouse gas emissions to 8.8 tCO2e by 2025 and to 7.7 tCO2e by 2030. Total emissions should be 81.65 MtCO2e in 2030. In the business as usual scenario the emissions would be 105.5 MtCO2e by 2030 or 10.0 tCO2e per capita. To reach it, the government of Israel wants to reduce the consumption of electricity by 17% relative to the business as usual scenario, produce 17% of electricity from renewables and shift 20% of transportation from cars to public transport by 2030. In an effort to comply with GHG emission reductions, Israel formed a committee with the goal of evaluating the country's potential to reduce emissions by the year 2030. Their findings have confirmed that Israel's power sector generates approximately half of the country's total GHG emissions. The second-largest offender is the transport sector, which produces approximately 19% of total emissions.

=== Jordan ===
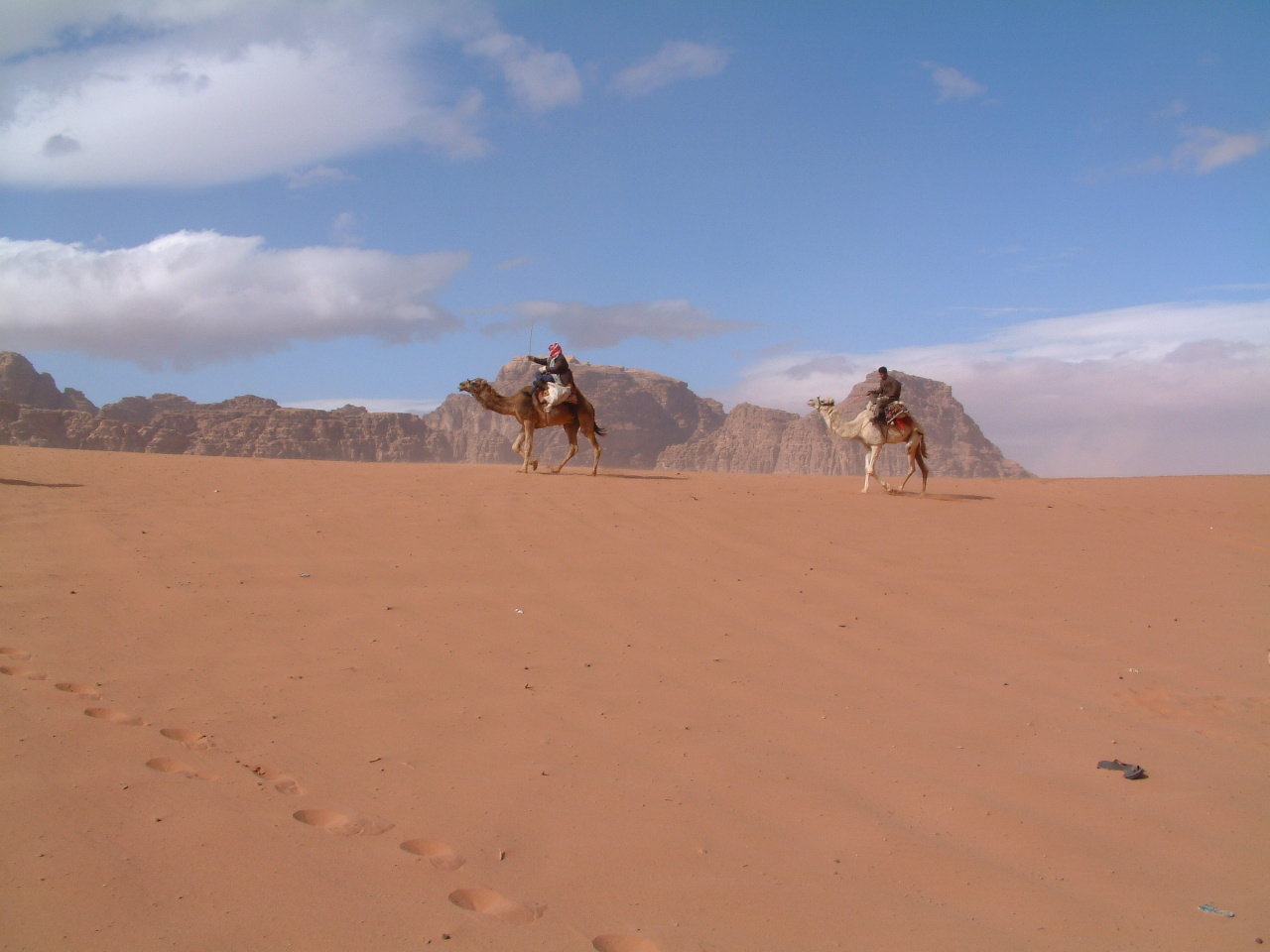
Jordan is mostly desert.

Climate change has a broad range of impacts in Jordan, including the already scarce water resources. The temperature increases adversely affect an already warmer and arid climate, and are accompanied by droughts, extreme temperatures, landslides and floods. Water resources in Jordan are scarce. Besides the rapid population growth, the impacts of climate change are likely to further exacerbate the problem. Temperatures will increase and the total annual precipitation is likely to decrease, however with a fair share of uncertainty. Hence, existing and new activities with the objective to minimize the gap between water supply and demand contribute to adapt Jordan to tomorrow's climate. This might be accompanied by activities improving Jordan's capacity to monitor and project meteorological and hydrological data and assess its own vulnerability to climate change.

Jordan has signed and ratified the Paris Treaty. It has updated its first Nationally Determined Contributions in 2021.

=== Morocco ===
Climate change is expected to significantly impact Morocco on multiple dimensions, similar to other countries in the Middle East and North Africa region. As a coastal country with hot and arid climates, environmental impacts from climate change are likely to be wide and varied. Analysis of these environmental changes on the economy of Morocco are expected to create challenges at all levels of the economy. The main effects will be felt in the agricultural systems and fisheries which employ half of the population, and account for 14% of GDP. In addition, because 60% of the population and most of the industrial activity are on the coast, sea level rise is a major threat to key economic forces. Morocco's average temperatures have increased by 0.2 °C per decade since the 1960s. Morocco is particularly susceptible to heat waves, droughts and floods.

Morocco ratified the Paris Agreement in 2015. Its Nationally Determined Contribution (NDC) aimed at reducing its greenhouse gas emissions (GHG) by 17% by 2030 compared to business-as-usual (BAU), with the possibility of a reduction of 32% conditional on receiving international support. In June 2021, Morocco submitted an updated NDC with more ambitious targets: reduce GHGs by 18.3% by 2030 compared to BAU, with a reduction of 45.5% conditional on receiving international support. Morocco's contribution to global GHGs is very small (about 0.18%) and majority of GHGs come from the energy sector. As of the 2023 Climate Change Performance Index, Morocco was ranked seventh in preparedness for climate change.

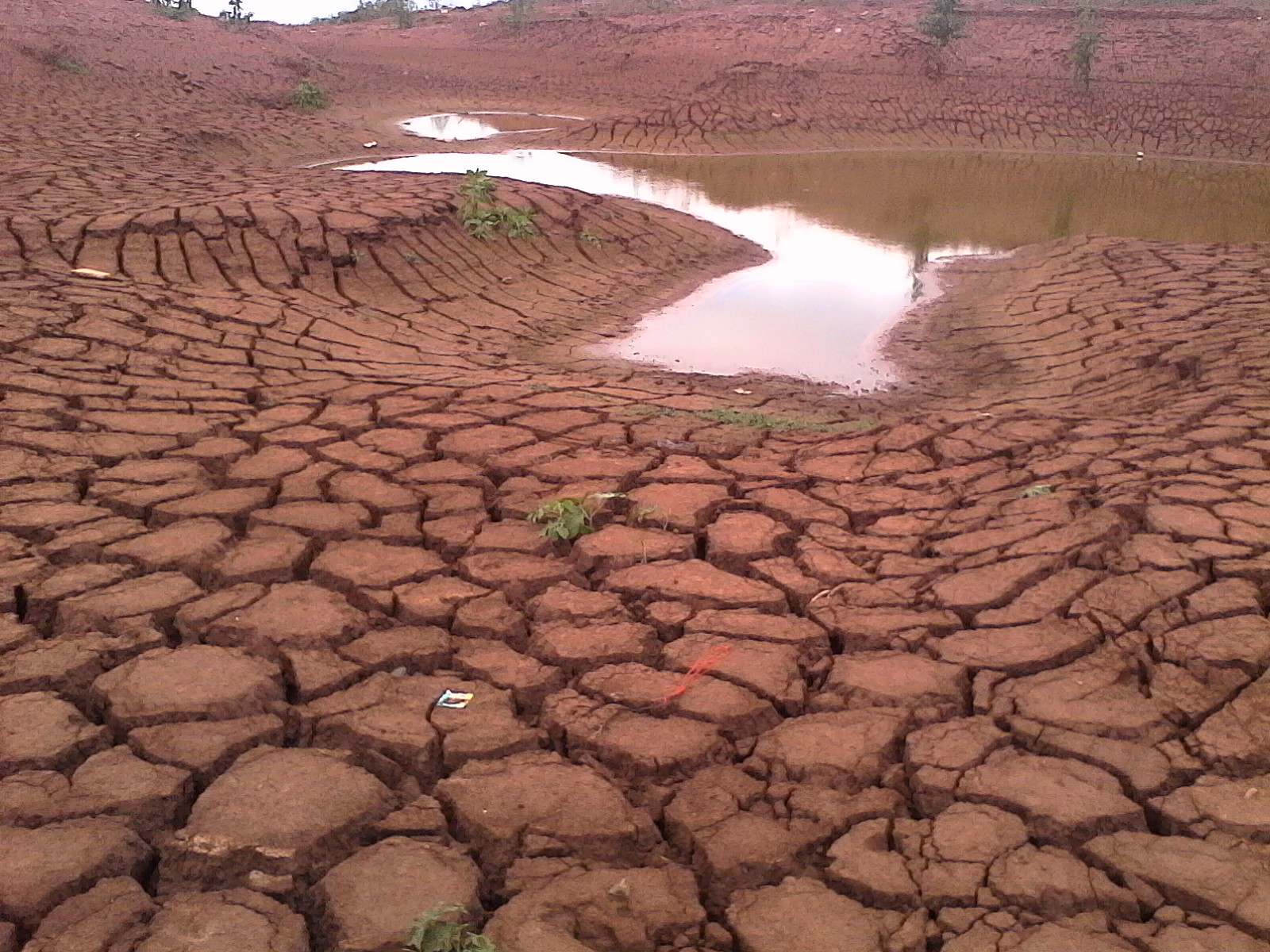
A dried body of water in Agadir. Climate change will increase the frequency of drought in Morocco.

=== Sudan ===
Köppen climate classification map for Sudan for 1980–2016

2071–2100 map under the most intense climate change scenario. Mid-range scenarios are currently considered more likely.

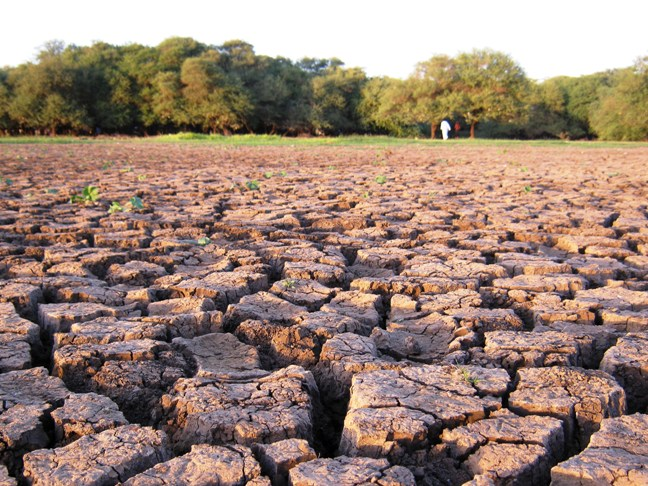
Drought conditions near Khartoum

In Sudan, climate change has caused an increase in temperatures, a decline in rainfall and driven desertification. Climate change poses significant challenges for rainfed agriculture and therefore the entire economy. Analysis of weather patterns suggest drought conditions and other extreme weather increased in Sudan during the 20th century. The relationship between climate change, water conflict and the war in Sudan has also been a topic of academic debate.

Blue Nile state has experienced significant impacts from climate change, being one of Sudan's fastest-warming regions. Moreover, there has been a 30-year decline in rainfall, which is becoming more irregular. Groundwater depletion has been observed Wad el-Mahi. Seasonal floods from the Blue Nile river and other streams have also worsened environmental conditions. Environmental degradation has been exacerbated by the excessive cutting of trees for charcoal production and improper handling of liquid and solid waste.

=== Tunisia ===
Tunisia is located in Northern Africa and is bordered by the Mediterranean Sea, Algeria, and Libya. Due to its geographical location, the country is divided into three regions: the Mediterranean region in the Northeast, the arid steppe region in the center, and a desert region in the South. When looking at the impacts of climate change, each region faces its own category of climate threats, with sea level rise jeopardizing the water quality of coastal aquifers in the Northeast and the center and Eastern regions of the country affected by variable precipitation, rising temperatures and increased extreme weather events such as floods.

Tunisia map of Köppen climate classification

Tunisia has recognized the urgent need to address climate change and is involved in international climate action. In 2016, Tunisia signed and ratified the Paris Agreement, committing to global efforts to limit global warming to well below 2 °C. In 2021, it submitted and revised an Updated Nationally Determined Contributions (NDCs), which has set an emissions reduction target of 45% below 2010 levels, by 2030. Through commitments like these Tunisia not only commits to solving its own diverse climate issues but also commits to decreasing emissions on a global scale.

=== Turkey ===
Heatwaves and droughts in Turkey are the main hazards due to its climate getting hotter. The temperature has risen in the 21st century, exceeding 50 °C (122 °F) in 2025, and there is more extreme weather. Due to differing geography effects vary across the country. Water supply to some cities is threatened. Turkey will host the 2026 United Nations Climate Change Conference and Murat Kurum says that climate finance is the most important issue.

== See also ==
- Climate change in Africa
- North African climate cycles
