= Beate G. Liepert =

Climate meteorology physicist

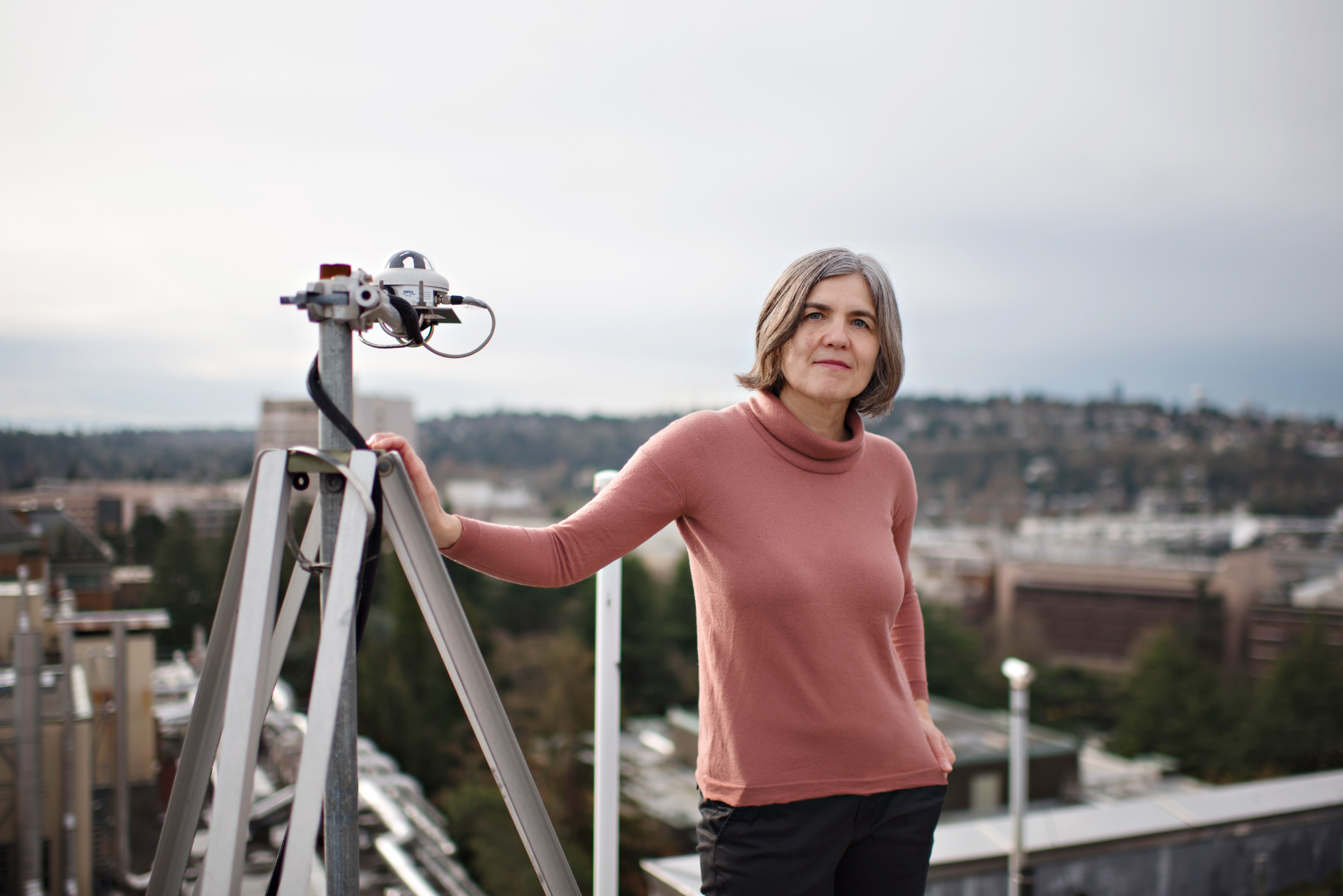
Liepert in March 2016

Beate Gertrud Liepert is a professor at Bard College in the Hudson Valley of New York. Her research focuses on climate variability: inter-annual changes, centennial time scales, the water and energy cycles.

== Education ==
Beate got her diploma in Meteorology at the Institute of Meteorology and Institute of Bioclimatology and Air Pollution Research, LMU Munich, Germany. In 1995, she obtained a PhD in Natural Science at the Institute of Meteorology, Department of Physics, LMU Munich, Germany.

== Career ==
Beate pioneered research on global dimming, which is the reduction of atmospheric transparency due to air pollution and inter-decadal cloud changes. She worked on implications of global dimming for climate: how and to what extend air pollution masks global warming, and how air pollution can spin down the hydrological cycle in a warmer and moister world. Some of her theoretical studies deal with climate forcing and feedbacks as studied in models and observations. She developed a climate model evaluation and ranking system that relies on first physical principles and self-consistency. Aerosol and solar radiation measurements in urban, as well as rural environments are also part of her research agenda, as is studying the effects of light quality on plant growths and ecosystems. More recently she started applying her knowledge to solar energy resource assessments and optimizing photovoltaic systems as alternative to fossil fuel and nuclear technologies.

Beate contributed a section on global dimming to the Intergovernmental Panel on Climate Change 4th Assessment Report "Scientific Basis" (chapter 3.4.4.2) that won the 2007 Nobel Peace Prize.

== Awards ==
- WINGS World Quest "Women of Discovery" Earth Award 2016
- Distinguished Guest Lecturer Environmental and Urban Studies Bard College, Annandale-on-Hudson, NY, March 2015

== Publications ==
1. Liepert, B.G. "Observed reductions of surface solar radiation at sites in the United States and worldwide from 1961 to 1990" Geophysical Research Letters, 29 (10), 611-614, 2002.
2. Liepert, B.G.; Feichter, J.; Lohmann, U.; Roeckner, E. "Can aerosols spin down the water cycle in a warmer and moister world?" Geophysical Research Letters 31, (6), 2004.
3. Feichter, J.; Roeckner, E.; Lohmann, U.; Liepert, B. "Nonlinear aspects of the climate response to greenhouse gas and aerosol forcing" Journal of Climate 17 (12), 2384-2398, 2004.
4. Previdi, M.; Liepert, B. G. "Annular modes and Hadley cell expansion under global warming" Geophysical Research Letters 34 (22), 2007.
5. D'Arrigo, R.; Wilson, R.; Liepert, B.; Cherubini, P. "On the divergence problem in northern forests: a review of the tree-ring evidence and possible causes," Global and Planetary Change,60 (3-4), 289-305, 2008.
6. Liepert, B.G.; Previdi, M. "Do models and observations disagree on the rainfall response to global warming?" Journal of Climate 22 (11), 3156-3166, 2009.
7. Liepert, B. G.; Previdi, M. "Inter-model variability and biases of the global water cycle in CMIP3 coupled climate models," Environmental Research Letters, v.7, 2012. doi:doi:10.1088/1748-9326/7/1/014006
8. Liepert, B.G.; Lo, F. "CMIP5 update of 'Inter-model variability and biases of the global water cycle in CMIP3 coupled climate models'" Environmental Research Letters 8 (2), 029401, 2013.
9. Liepert, B.; Fabian, P.; Grassl, H. "Solar radiation in Germany-observed trends and an assessment of their causes" Contributions to atmospheric physics 67 (1), 15-29, 1994.
