= Hugh Coe =

British atmospheric physicist

- Education: Newcastle University
- Known for: Atmospheric aerosols
- Awards: Vilhelm Bjerknes Medal; 2022
- Scientific career
- Fields: Atmospheric physics
- Workplaces: University of Manchester
- Thesis: The Exchange of Nitrogen Dioxide and Ozone Between Vegetation and the Atmosphere (1993)
- Website: Official website

Hugh Coe is a British atmospheric physicist, currently Head of Atmospheric Sciences and Professor of Atmospheric Composition at the University of Manchester. His research investigates the physics and chemistry of atmospheric aerosols, including their role in climate change and air pollution.

== Early life and career ==
Coe took a BSc in physics at Newcastle University in 1989, followed by a PhD titled "The Exchange of Nitrogen Dioxide and Ozone Between Vegetation and the Atmosphere" at UMIST in 1993. He has worked at the University of Manchester ever since.

== Research interests ==
Coe studies the physics and chemistry of aerosols in the atmosphere, including the part they play in climate change through interactions with clouds and solar radiation. He also studies the role of aerosols in the transport of air pollution, including regional and transboundary (long-distance) pollution caused by biomass burning and atmospheric dust. Coe has worked on air pollution studies in the UK, India, and China, and was the principal investigator of a major study into air pollution in the Indo-Gangetic Plain.

Coe has also helped to develop new analytic techniques for studying air pollution. These include "transformative" approaches to aerosol mass spectrometry, which have led to "an unprecedented understanding of the global distribution of atmospheric fine particulate matter composition", and using the single particle soot photometer for studying how particulates are transported.

== Awards ==
Coe was awarded the Vilhelm Bjerknes Medal (2022) for "pioneering the science of atmospheric composition through instrument development and fine particle measurements, to study their impact on air quality, clouds and climate". According to the European Geosciences Union, which made the award: "Hugh Coe’s body of work on understanding the chemistry and global distribution of aerosols provide the underpinning data used to develop and test our global atmospheric models, and are foundational in our assessments of air pollution and climate change". Coe was recognised as one of the 100 Most Highly Cited Researchers in Geosciences in 2014 and 2018 by Clarivate. In 2015, Coe was a joint recipient of a British Academy Newton Advanced Fellowship, with Lin Wang of Fudan University, for research into secondary organic aerosols using time-of-flight mass spectrometry.

== Media appearances ==
Coe has made a number of radio, TV, and press appearances as an expert on air pollution issues, including such topics as Manchester's urban pollution and its proposed clean-air zone, the atmospheric modelling of Iceland's Eyjafjallajökull volcano eruption in 2010, and reductions in air pollution during the COVID-19 lockdowns.

== Selected publications ==
=== Papers ===
- Canagaratna, M.R.; Jayne, J.T.; Jimenez, J.L.; Allan, J.D.; Alfarra, M.R.; et al. (17 January 2007). "Chemical and microphysical characterization of ambient aerosols with the aerodyne aerosol mass spectrometer". Mass Spectrometry Reviews. 26 (2): 185–222. Bibcode:2007MSRv...26..185C. doi:10.1002/mas.20115. eISSN 1098-2787. ISSN 0277-7037. PMID 17230437.
- Zhang, Q.; Jimenez, J. L.; Canagaratna, M. R.; Allan, J. D.; Coe, H.; et al. (7 July 2007). "Ubiquity and dominance of oxygenated species in organic aerosols in anthropogenically-influenced Northern Hemisphere midlatitudes". Geophysical Research Letters. 34 (13): n/a. Bibcode:2007GeoRL..3413801Z. doi:10.1029/2007GL029979. ISSN 0094-8276. S2CID 42885140.
- Jimenez, J. L.; Canagaratna, M. R.; Donahue, N. M.; Prevot, A. S. H.; Zhang, Q.; et al. (11 December 2009). "Evolution of Organic Aerosols in the Atmosphere". Science. 326 (5959): 1525–1529. Bibcode:2009Sci...326.1525J. doi:10.1126/science.1180353. eISSN 1095-9203. ISSN 0036-8075. PMID 20007897. S2CID 24417049.

=== Books and book chapters ===
- Hugh Coe; James D. Allen (2008). ""Mass spectrometric methods for aerosol composition measurement"". In Dwayne Heard (ed.). Analytical Techniques for Atmospheric Measurement. John Wiley & Sons. pp. 165–310. ISBN 978-1-4051-7144-1.
