= John Plane =

British atmospheric chemist

John M.C. Plane FRAS FRSC FRS
- Born: 1958 (age 67–68); South Africa
- Education: University of Cambridge
- Known for: Chemistry of troposphere and mesosphere
- Awards: Tilden Prize 2006; Vilhelm Bjerknes Medal 2017
- Scientific career
- Fields: Atmospheric chemistry
- Workplaces: University of Miami; University of East Anglia; University of Leeds
- Website: Official website

John Maurice Campbell Plane is a British atmospheric chemist, currently Professor of Atmospheric Chemistry at the University of Leeds. His research investigates planetary atmospheres using a range of theoretical and experimental techniques.

== Early life and career ==
Plane was born in South Africa. He took an MA (1979) and a PhD (1983) at the University of Cambridge, where he also held a research fellowship. Later, he held academic appointments at the University of Miami and the University of East Anglia, before moving to the University of Leeds.

== Research interests ==
Plane's research focuses on understanding the chemistry of planetary atmospheres (including Earth's) involving a combination of laboratory techniques (kinetics and photochemistry), atmospheric measurements (in situ and satellite remote sensing), and modelling at different scales. His research group studies four main areas: Earth's mesosphere (middle and upper atmosphere) and troposphere (lower atmosphere), the atmospheres of other planets, and interstellar chemistry (such as the formation of stardust). Plane is particularly noted for his work on the chemistry of metals that ablate ("erode") from cosmic dust particles, such as meteoroids, as they enter the atmosphere. He is an expert on mesospheric metal chemistry, a pioneer of Differential Optical Absorption Spectroscopy (DOAS), and one of the developers of tropospheric iodine chemistry – a means of studying the composition of Earth's atmosphere. He has authored over 240 peer-reviewed papers.

== Awards ==
Plane has received numerous honours and awards, including the Royal Society of Chemistry prize in Reaction Kinetics and Mechanisms (2005), a Royal Society of Chemistry Tilden Prize Lectureship (2006) ("for his outstanding contributions to our understanding of the chemistry of the troposphere and mesosphere through field measurements, laboratory experiments and theory"), the National Science Foundation CEDAR (Coupling, Energetics, and Dynamics of Atmospheric Regions) Lecture Prize (2007), and the European Geosciences Union Vilhelm Bjerknes Medal (2017) ("in recognition of his groundbreaking work in atmospheric chemistry"). He was elected a Fellow of the American Geophysical Union in 2017. He is also a Fellow of the Royal Society of Chemistry and a Fellow of the Royal Astronomical Society, and was elected a Fellow of the Royal Society in 2020. In 2022, he was elected a member of the Academia Europaea.

The IAU named after him the asteroid nr. 33832 of the Main belt, Johnplane.

== Selected publications ==
- Plane, John (10 December 2003). "Atmospheric chemistry of meteoric metals". Chemical Reviews. 103 (12): 4963–4984. doi:10.1021/cr0205309. PMID 14664639.
- Simpson, W. R.; von Glasow, R.; Riedel, K.; Anderson, P.; Ariya, P.; et al. (22 August 2007). "Halogens and their role in polar boundary-layer ozone depletion". Atmospheric Chemistry and Physics. 7 (16): 4375–4418. Bibcode:2007ACP.....7.4375S. doi:10.5194/acp-7-4375-2007.
- Grannas, A. M.; Jones, A. E.; Dibb, J.; Ammann, M.; Anastasio, C.; et al. (22 August 2007). "An overview of snow photochemistry: evidence, mechanisms and impacts". Atmospheric Chemistry and Physics. 7 (16): 4329–4373. Bibcode:2007ACP.....7.4329G. doi:10.5194/acp-7-4329-2007. hdl:2060/20070034833. S2CID 7653506.
- Saiz-Lopez, Alfonso; Plane, John M. C.; Baker, Alex R.; Carpenter, Lucy J.; von Glasow, Roland; et al. (27 October 2011). "Atmospheric Chemistry of Iodine". Chemical Reviews. 112 (3): 1773–1804. doi:10.1021/cr200029u. hdl:10261/343463. ISSN 0009-2665. PMID 22032347.
