= Akio Arakawa =

Japanese-born American climate scientist (1927–2021)

- Born: July 20, 1927
- Died: March 21, 2021 (aged 93)
- Education: University of Tokyo
- Awards: Vilhelm Bjerknes Medal; 2010
- Scientific career
- Workplaces: University of California, Los Angeles

Akio Arakawa (July 20, 1927 – March 21, 2021) was a Japanese-born American climate scientist. He was a professor in the Department of Atmospheric and Oceanic Sciences at the University of California, Los Angeles.

== Early life and achievements ==
Arakawa was the youngest of three sons. Living through World War II in Japan, he recalled his two older brothers served in the Japanese military without incident, while he was drafted to work as a fireman part-time while finishing high school. He entered the University of Tokyo in 1947, and spent three years majoring in physics. After graduating in 1950, he applied for one of the few jobs available for physics graduates, with the Japan Meteorological Agency. The agency stationed him on a weather ship to gain experience, and after working in that area for a year and a half, he sought another role in the agency, and was able to gain a position in the forecast research division.

In the 1950s, Arakawa developed mathematics that "permitted the use of a coarser grid" to reduce the computational time needed to estimate climate changes from air sampling data. During this time, Arakawa consulted on the early Goddard Institute for Space Studies (GISS) weather model, later taken up and further advanced by meteorologist Dr. James Hansen.

Yale Mintz recruited Arakawa to UCLA to help him build general circulation models of the atmosphere, and from 1961 the two built a series of them. With Frank Winninghoff, Arakawa studied how geostrophic adjustment depends on the arrangement of the variables on a model's grid, and they compared five arrangements, labeled A to E. These five grids later came to bear his name as the Arakawa grids.

== Recognition and later life ==
In 1977, Arakawa was awarded the Carl-Gustaf Rossby Research Medal, the highest award in the field of atmospheric science, from the American Meteorological Society, for his work on "mathematical models of the atmosphere and in numerical methods of weather prediction". In 2010, he received the Vilhelm Bjerknes Medal from the European Geosciences Union.

Arakawa was one of the nine scientists who wrote the Charney report in 1979, which predicted a global warming-related temperature rise over the next century and a climate sensitivity of 3°C.
