= Pinhas Alpert =

Professor of Atmospheric Sciences at Tel Aviv University

- פנחס אלפרט
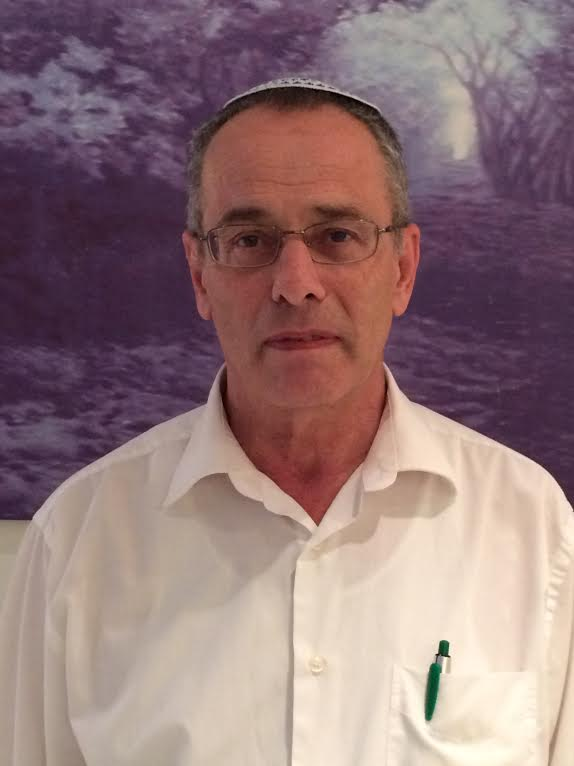
- Born: 29 September 1949; Jerusalem
- Occupations: Meteorologist; university teacher
- Employer: Tel Aviv University (1998–)
- Awards: Vilhelm Bjerknes Medal (The 2018 Vilhelm Bjerknes Medal is awarded to Pinhas Alpert for his outstanding contributions to atmospheric dynamics and aerosol science., 2018)
- Website: www.tau.ac.il/~pinhas/

Pinhas Alpert (Hebrew: פנחס אלפרט) is a professor of Atmospheric Sciences at Tel Aviv University.

== Biography ==
Alpert was born in Jerusalem in 1949. On his father's side he is the fourth generation in Jerusalem – his great-grandfather came to Israel from Slonim-Russia in 1867 and was a teacher (Melamed, in Hebrew) in the Hurva Synagogue in the Old city. Alpert studied until the age of 6 in his grandfather's "Cheder", then in the "Etz-Haim" Talmud-Torah in the Zichron-Moshe neighborhood of Jerusalem. Then, he moved in 1957 to the ”Moriah" school in the Bucharim neighborhood in Jerusalem. His high school was ”Dugma. After finishing high school he was accepted to the academic reserve (in Hebrew העתודה האקדמית) and studied Physics-Mathematics at the Hebrew University, in a special program which included computer studies for the first time in Israel. Following his B.Sc., he continued to M.Sc. in Physics during his IDF service.

In the IDF he became in 1973 a weather forecaster in the Air Force meteorology unit. He later became the commander of meteorology for the Air Force‘s transport base, for 3 years. In 1977 he left the IDF with the rank of captain, and later became a major during his reserve service. Alpert was asked to continue his reserve service in the IDF, as an exception, until the age of 56, since he had developed the modeling scientific basis for the modern forecasting infrastructure at the Meteorological Service and the Air Force.

Alpert is married to Rachel, RN, and is the father of eight children.

== Academic career ==
During his service as a Meteorology officer in the Israel Air Force, Alpert was confronted with the severe difficulty of flood forecasting. This motivated him to develop new techniques to predict and monitor rain, as well as to develop high-resolution models to improve forecasting. In parallel with his military service, he began to work at the Hebrew University on light scattering from atmospheric aerosols.

After his release from the IDF he began his Ph.D. studies at the Hebrew University of Jerusalem, during which he built his own meteorological model, which successfully explained the typical summer afternoon storms over the Sea of Galilee (Lake Kinneret). Upon finishing his Ph.D. in 1980, he was invited to a post-doctorate at Harvard University. For two years Alpert worked with Richard Lindzen and studied the Indian Monsoon. During his post-doctorate he developed a physical model incorporating feedback from the moist surface.

After two years in Boston, in 1982, he was invited by the Department of Geophysics and Planetary Sciences at Tel-Aviv University (now the Department of Earth Sciences) to become a faculty member. In the year 2004 he was elected an honorary member of the world Jewish Academy for Sciences. During the years 2005–2008 Alpert served as Head of the Department of Geophysics at Tel-Aviv University, and then in 2008–2013 he served as the Head of the TAU Porter School for Environmental Studies.

== Research ==
Alpert's research group is engaged in theoretical studies and observations of the dynamics of atmospheric processes, using hydro-dynamical models for numerically solving the development of different phenomena. He was the first to investigate theoretically several synoptic systems in Israel, including Sharav low, Cyprus low, Red Sea Trough, etc.

Remote sensing observations include satellites, radar, and recently data collected by cellular antennas used for communication. This last source was first identified in his research, published in "Science" Magazine. Recently this method was applied for novel flood warning and monitoring of rain, fog, and humidity.

In order to investigate atmospheric phenomena Alpert devised a method allowing for the identification of the effect by different factors, including separation of synergistic effects.

The atmospheric models applied by Alpert are of three different types: The first is used for study of weather forecasting difficulties, and investigating phenomena such as rain, cyclone genesis, winds, etc. The second type is of climate models which can be run ~100 years into the future, and with this method Alpert was the first to investigate detailed potential climate changes due to global warming in the Middle-East. The third type of models focuses on aerosols in the atmosphere, with emphasis on mineral dust mainly from the Sahara and the Middle-East region, as well as sea-salt particles, and their effect on weather and climate.

== Publications ==
Alpert has published over 240 articles in scientific peer-reviews journals, and an additional ~100 chapters in books.

In 2011 his book "Factor Separation in the Atmosphere: Applications and Future Prospects" was published by Cambridge Academic Press. The book describes the factor separation method that he developed since 1993 for investigating interactions in the atmosphere. The method was adopted globally by many research groups, and the book describes many and various applications.

In 2009 his book "Rain and Wind – meteorology in light of Judaism" (in Hebrew גשם ורוח – מטאורולוגיה בראי היהדות) was published by Rubin Mass press. In this book Alpert analyses weather phenomena appearing in Jewish literature, provides modern scientific explanations, and ties the literary descriptions to common situations in the climate of Israel.

In 2014 his book "Diary of a Jerusalem Muchtar" (in Hebrew- יומנו של מוכתר בירושלים") was published by Bar-Ilan University publishing house. The book reproduces the historic journal written by Alpert‘s uncle during the British Mandate, when he served as a ”muchtar", or head of neighborhood, in north Jerusalem.

== Honours ==
Alpert had sabbaticals at NASA, where he was given the Goddard Fellow title, as well as in USA and UK universities. He was invited as a lecturer to the program at Université catholique de Louvain Belgium, the French Meteorological Research Center in Toulouse, and NASA‘s Goddard Space Flight Center.

Alpert was the first Israeli to be awarded the Vilhelm Bjerknes Medal by the European Geosciences Union for 2018, in recognition of his achievements in the field of Atmospheric Sciences.
