= Vilhelm Bjerknes Medal =

Meteorology award

The Vilhelm Bjerknes Medal is an award presented by the European Geosciences Union (and its predecessor, the European Geophysical Society) that recognizes "distinguished research in atmospheric sciences". It was first awarded in 1997, to Brian Hoskins, and later recipients include the Nobel-Prize-winning oceanographer and climate scientist Klaus Hasselmann. The award is named for Vilhelm Bjerknes, Norwegian pioneer of weather forecasting, whose likeness features on the medal itself, designed by sculptor József Kótai.

== Recipients ==
- 2026 – Jonathan Williams
- 2025 – Ulrike Lohmann
- 2024 – Lucy Carpenter
- 2023 – Christoph Schär
- 2022 – Hugh Coe
- 2021 – Spyros Pandis
- 2020 – Michael Prather
- 2019 – Johannes Lelieveld
- 2018 – Pinhas Alpert
- 2017 – John Plane
- 2016 – Maria Kanakidou
- 2014 – Urs Baltensperger
- 2013 – John Burrows
- 2012 – Adrian Simmons
- 2011 – Karin Labitzke
- 2010 – Akio Arakawa
- 2009 – J. Ray Bates
- 2008 – Gury Marchuk
- 2007 – Markku Kulmala
- 2006 – Erich Roeckner
- 2005 – David Williamson
- 2004 – Joseph Egger
- 2003 – Joost Businger
- 2002 – Klaus Hasselmann
- 2001 – Fedor Mesinger
- 2000 – Sergej Zilitinkevich
- 1999 – Jean-Claude André
- 1998 – Arnt Eliassen
- 1997 – Brian Hoskins

== See also ==
- List of meteorology awards
- List of prizes named after people
