= Jean-Claude André =

French weather and climate scientist

Jean-Claude André (born 28 August 1946) is a French weather and climate specialist.

== Career path ==
Former student of the École Polytechnique (class of 1965). Researcher at the Établissement d'Études et de Recherches Météorologiques (EERM/Paris, 1970–82), at the National Center for Atmospheric Research (Boulder/USA, 1971–72), and at Oregon State University (Corvallis/USA, 1980–81). D in Physical Sciences in 1976.

In 1982, he became the first director of the Centre National de Recherches Météorologiques (CNRM, Toulouse), a position he held until the end of 1994. From 1995 to 2010, Director of the European Center for Research and Advanced Training in Scientific Computing (CERFACS, Toulouse). Since then, he has been retired as General Engineer of Water and Forestry.

He was a lecturer in mechanics at the École Polytechnique (part-time, 1976–90), and Professor of Physics at the École Nationale Supérieure de l'Aéronautique et de l'Espace (part-time, 1988–92). Elected to the French Academy of sciences, correspondent of the Universe Sciences section, in 1990, he is also a founding member of the French Academy of Technologies (2000).

== Scientific work ==
Jean-Claude André's scientific work concerns four main subjects.

During the first half of the 1970s, he first worked on the irreversibility of homogeneous and isotropic turbulence and proposed the first theoretical formulation of the shape of the turbulent damping coefficient, using an original method, which was independently taken up and formalized under the name of "renormalization theory". He applied this consideration of irreversibility in the formulation of so-called Eddy-Damped Quasi-Normal (EDQNM) approximation with the Nice school (U. Frisch and collaborators)". He then used the EDQNM approximation to realistically simulate homogeneous and isotropic turbulence in 2 and then 3 dimensions and, in the latter case, showed the role of helicity, an innovative work taken up ten years later in the US to explain the dynamics of convective atmospheric systems.

He then, during the second half of the 1970s and the first half of the 1980s, developed, on the basis of ideas deduced qualitatively from his previous work in turbulence theory, a method of "one-point" closure at the third order of the turbulence equations, called the "clipping" approximation. Thanks to this approximation, he and his research team at the EERM carried out some "firsts": first simulation with a one-point closure method of penetrating convection; then subsequent applications to numerous atmospheric boundary layer situations, with extension to the cloudy case. These results have been widely cited in the international literature. These third-order simulations have also been used as a "numerical laboratory" to develop and calibrate simpler methods, known as "parameterizations", for example in the case of top boundary layer entrainment or night boundary layer development. Taking advantage of his stay at Oregon State University, he applied the "clipping" method to the simulation of the surface ocean, allowing on the one hand the simulation of the diurnal cycle of the ocean surface temperature, and on the other hand to develop and calibrate simpler (second-order) methods, which are at the origin of the taking into account of turbulence in many current ocean models.

From the second half of the 1980s, it gradually turned its attention to climate issues. He thus proposed an original method using medium-scale atmospheric modeling as an integrating tool to estimate the fluxes (of heat, water vapor) at the soil-vegetation-atmosphere interface at the scale of the grid cell of a climate model. In support of this numerical modeling work, he designed, organized and carried out, in the South-West of France, a large-scale international experimental campaign (F, GB, USA...), based on this concept: HAPEX-MOBLHY 86, the first of a long series of large meteorological-hydrological campaigns still in progress within the framework of the international GEWEX program. At the same time, he also designed and directed in the field the IAGO (Ocean-Ice-Atmosphere Interactions) measurement campaign in Terre Adélie, designed to qualify the influence of strong winds (katabatic winds) affecting the circumference of the Antarctic continent: meridional heat transfer, sea ice dislocation, ...

Finally, since the mid-1990s, he has been involved, in support of his teams, in the development of data assimilation (particularly oceanic data) for the initialization of seasonal climate prediction models, as well as in the analysis of extreme climate events, in particular the heat wave of summer 2003. More generally, he supervises and leads numerous activities in the field of scientific computing: advanced simulation methods in various fields (climate, aerodynamics, combustion), generic methods for code coupling, software for data assimilation, etc. Finally, it is very involved in reflection and prospective studies in numerous European contracts dealing with numerical simulation.

== Other Institutional Responsibilities ==
- Member of the Scientific Councils of Defense (1994-1997), Electricité de France (1996-2002), the Nuclear Energy Directorate of the CEA (2002-2018), the National Computer Center for Higher Education, CINES (2003-2006), the Research Foundation for Aeronautics and Space (2005-2011), the Strategic Committee for Intensive Computing (2009-2013), the Electricity Transmission Network, RTE (2011-2015);

- President of the Scientific Councils of the National Geographic Institute (1998-2001), of the Program "Management and Impacts of Climate Change" (1998-2005), of the National Technological Research Center "Aeronautics and Space" (2002-2007), of the ORAP "Associative Organization on Parallelism" (2005-2009), of the "Intensive Computing" Program of the National Research Agency (2005-2007), of the EADS Corporate Foundation (2007-2010);

- Member of the Advisory Committee of Deontology and Ethics of the Institute of Research for Development (2005-2013);

- chairman of the Board of Directors of the GIP (Public Interest Grouping) "MEDIAS-France" (1994-2006);

- President of the French Meteorological Society (1995-1997);

- Executive Secretary of the MERCATOR inter-agency program for the development of operational oceanography (1997-2001);

- Vice-president of the National Center for Technological Research "Aeronautics and Space" (2002-2007);

- Member of the Steering Committee of the RTRA (Thematic Network of Advanced Research) STAE "Sciences and Technologies for Aeronautics and Space" (2007-2017).

== Awards ==
- Victor Raulin Prize of the French Academy of sciences (1984);
- Honorary Member of the European Geophysical Society (1989);
- Member of the Academia Europaea (1992);
- Medal of Honor of Aeronautics (Bronze, 1993; Silver, 2000);
- Member of the Académie des Jeux Floraux (1994);
- Silver Medal of the National Academy of Air and Space (1994);
- Chevalier of the Ordre national du Mérite (1995);
- Vilhelm Bjerknes Medal of the European Geophysical Society (1999);
- Socio d'Onore della Societa Italiana per il Progresso della Scienze (2009);
- Chevalier of the Légion d'Honneur (2011);
- Chevalier in the Ordre des Palmes Académiques (2014);
- Corresponding member of the French Academy of sciences (1990).
