= Joost Businger =

Dutch-American meteorologist (1924–2023)

Joost Alois Businger (March 29, 1924 – 2023) was a Dutch-American meteorologist. He was a professor at the University of Washington. Businger is best known for his work on atmospheric boundary layer (ABL).

== Life and career ==
Businger was born in Haarlem, the Netherlands, on March 29, 1924. He obtained his PhD in physics and meteorology from Utrecht University in 1954. As a PhD student he did research on turbulent transfer of heat, mass and momentum in the atmospheric surface layer. He came up with a similar concept around the same time as the Monin–Obukhov similarity theory was founded in the Soviet Union, with the two concepts varying slightly. Businger subsequently spend some time at the Institute of Horticultural Engineering of Wageningen University. At the institute he studied microclimate in greenhouses and the protection of crops from frost by use of sprinklers. Wishing to study atmospheric science further, Businger saw no options to do so in the Netherlands. He thus sent out inquiry letters to different universities in the United States, and in 1956 was hired as research associate by the University of Wisconsin–Madison.

In 1958 Businger was hired assistant professor at the University of Washington. In 1961 he was promoted to associate professor. He became a full professor in 1964. Businger retired from the University of Washington in 1983. He then started working at the National Center for Atmospheric Research and retired fully in 1989. His archives from 1957 to 1989 are held at the University of Washington library.

Businger has been described as one of the first to recognize the scientific and practical importance of the atmospheric boundary layer (ABL) and worked on the development of the sonic anemometer.

Businger died in 2023.

== Honours and distinctions ==
Businger was elected a corresponding member of the Royal Netherlands Academy of Arts and Sciences in 1980. He was elected a member of the National Academy of Engineering in 2001 for "contributions to the field of atmospheric turbulence transport and its applications". Businger was awarded the Vilhelm Bjerknes Medal by the European Geophysical Society in 2003, "for his fundamental contributions to the understanding of atmospheric turbulence and boundary layer processes and structure".

Apart from his scientific career Businger is known for his conservation efforts on Guemes Island and Sinclair Island.
