= Fazia Dahleb =

Algerian politician

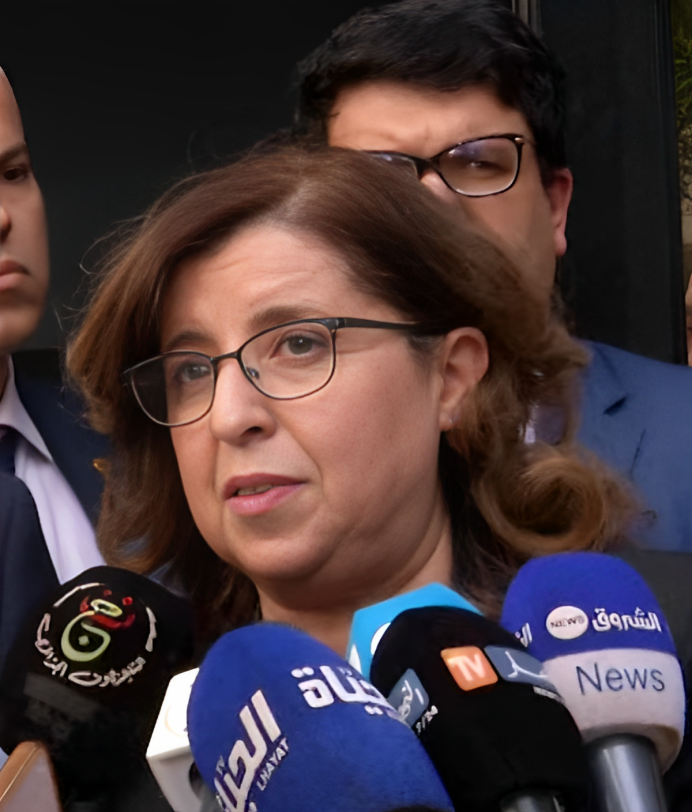

Minister of Environment and Renewable Energy
- Incumbent
- Assumed office 16 March 2023
- President: Abdelmadjid Tebboune
- Prime Minister: Aymen Benabderrahmane; Nadir Larbaoui
- Preceded by: Samia Moualfi

Personal details
- Born: January 27, 1967 (age 59)

Fazia Dahleb (born 25 January 1967) is an Algerian politician. She has served as Minister of Environment and Renewable Energy since her appointment in 16 March 2023.
