= Ulrike Lohmann =

German climate researcher

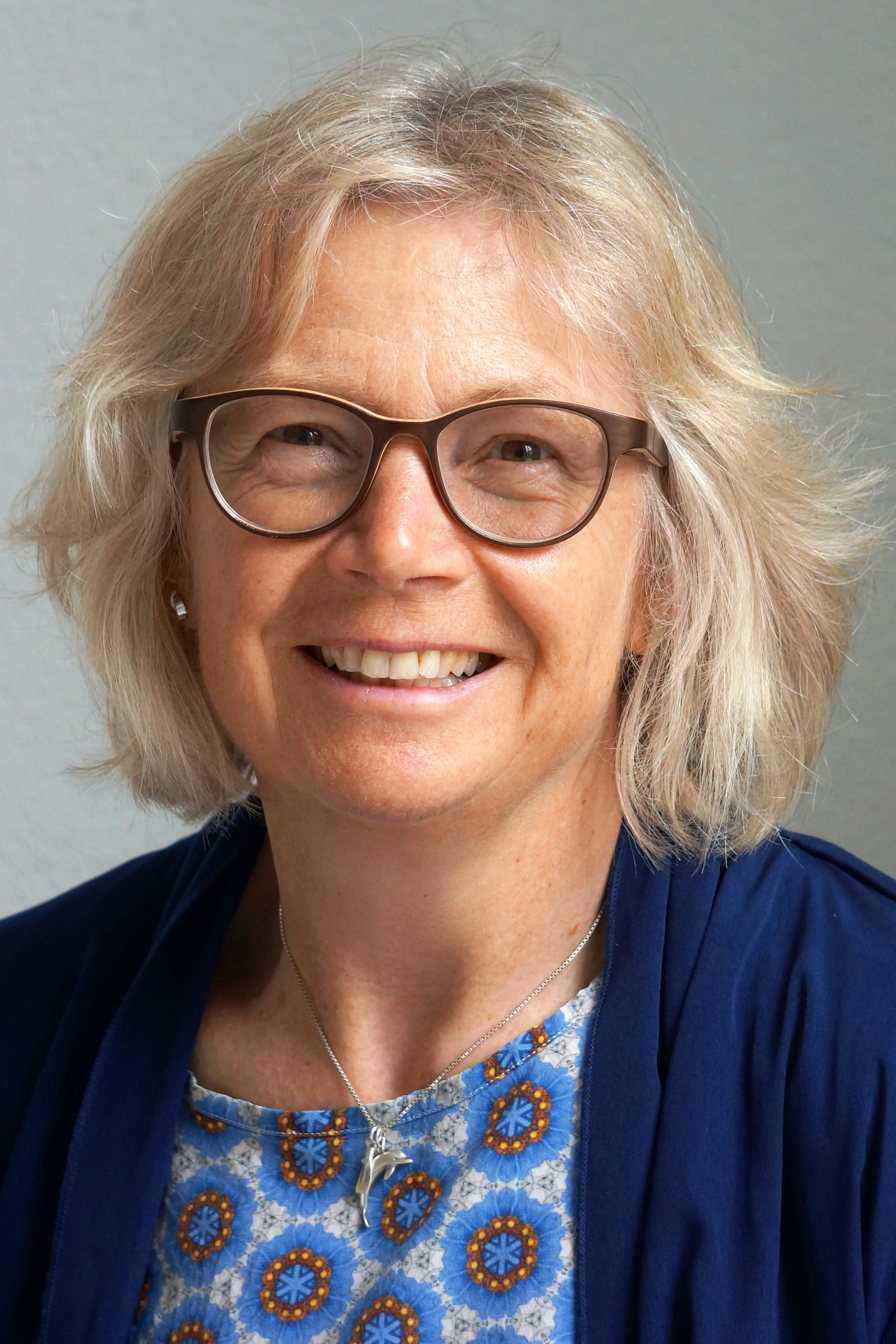
- Born: 1966
- Education: Max-Planck-Institut für Meteorologie
- Scientific career
- Workplaces: ETH Zurich
- Thesis: Sensitivität des Modellklimas eines globalen Zirkulationsmodells der Atmosphäre gegenüber Änderungen der Wolkenmikrophysik (1996)

Ulrike Lohmann (born 1966) is a climate researcher and professor for atmospheric physics at the ETH Zurich. She is known for her research on aerosol particles in clouds.

== Early life, education, and career ==
Lohmann comes from Kiel as the daughter of a teacher and a politician in the Social Democratic Party of Germany. She did a volunteer year in an SOS Children's Village in Nigeria, and then studied ethnology and geography. Inspired by environmental reports on climate change, she studied meteorology at the University of Mainz from 1988 to 1993. She received her doctorate in 1996 at the Max Planck Institute for Meteorology. She initially worked as assistant professor and associate professor for atmospheric sciences at Dalhousie University. She has been a full professor of atmospheric physics at the Institute for Atmosphere and Climate at ETH Zurich since 2004.

== Research ==
Lohmann's research centers on the interactions between global warming, aerosols, and cloud formation. Her early research modeled the influence of cirrus clouds on climate, which she continued in her use of the ECHAM model. Her research also considers the global indirect aerosol effects and the connection to climate change. She also deals with the possibility of geoengineering by thinning cirrus clouds. In the 2017 Science article, she notes "for the time being, cirrus cloud thinning should be viewed as a thought experiment that is helping to understand cirrus cloud–formation mechanisms".

She is one of the lead authors on the chapters on Clouds and Aerosols in the fourth and fifth assessment reports of the Intergovernmental Panel on Climate Change (IPCC), and she shared in the 2007 Nobel Peace Prize for her contribution to the IPCC reports.

Lohmann supports the young people striking to draw attention to climate change, and in 2019 she was one of the scientists signing on to a statement on the school protests for climate protection to draw attention to the climate crisis.

=== Selected publications ===
- Lohmann, U.; Feichter, J. (3 March 2005). "Global indirect aerosol effects: a review". Atmospheric Chemistry and Physics. 5 (3): 715–737. Bibcode:2005ACP.....5..715L. doi:10.5194/acp-5-715-2005. hdl:20.500.11850/33632. ISSN 1680-7324.
- Lohmann, Ulrike; Gasparini, Blaž; Haberland, G. (21 July 2017). "A cirrus cloud climate dial?". Science. 357 (6348): 248–249. Bibcode:2017Sci...357..248L. doi:10.1126/science.aan3325. PMID 28729496. S2CID 5090908.
- Storelvmo, T.; Leirvik, T.; Lohmann, U.; Phillips, P. C. B.; Wild, M. (April 2016). "Disentangling greenhouse warming and aerosol cooling to reveal Earth's climate sensitivity" (PDF). Nature Geoscience. 9 (4): 286–289. Bibcode:2016NatGe...9..286S. doi:10.1038/ngeo2670.
- Lohmann, Ulrike; Lüönd, Felix; Mahrt, Fabian (30 April 2016). An Introduction to Clouds: From the Microscale to Climate (PDF). Cambridge University Press. Bibcode:2016icfm.book.....L. doi:10.1017/cbo9781139087513. ISBN 978-1-107-01822-8.

== Awards ==
- Henry G. Houghton Award, American Meteorological Society (2007)
- Fellow, American Geophysical Union (2008)
- The Golden Tricycle from ETH Zurich for family-friendly leadership (2013)
- Elected member, German National Academy of Sciences, Leopoldina (2014)
- Peter Hobbs Memorial lecture, University of Washington (2016)
- Honorary doctorate from Stockholm University (2018)
- Vilhelm Bjerknes Medal, European Geosciences Union (2025)

== Personal life ==
She lives on Lake Zurich, and her passions are endurance sports and rowing.
