= Johannes Lelieveld =

Dutch atmospheric chemist

Johannes "Jos" Lelieveld
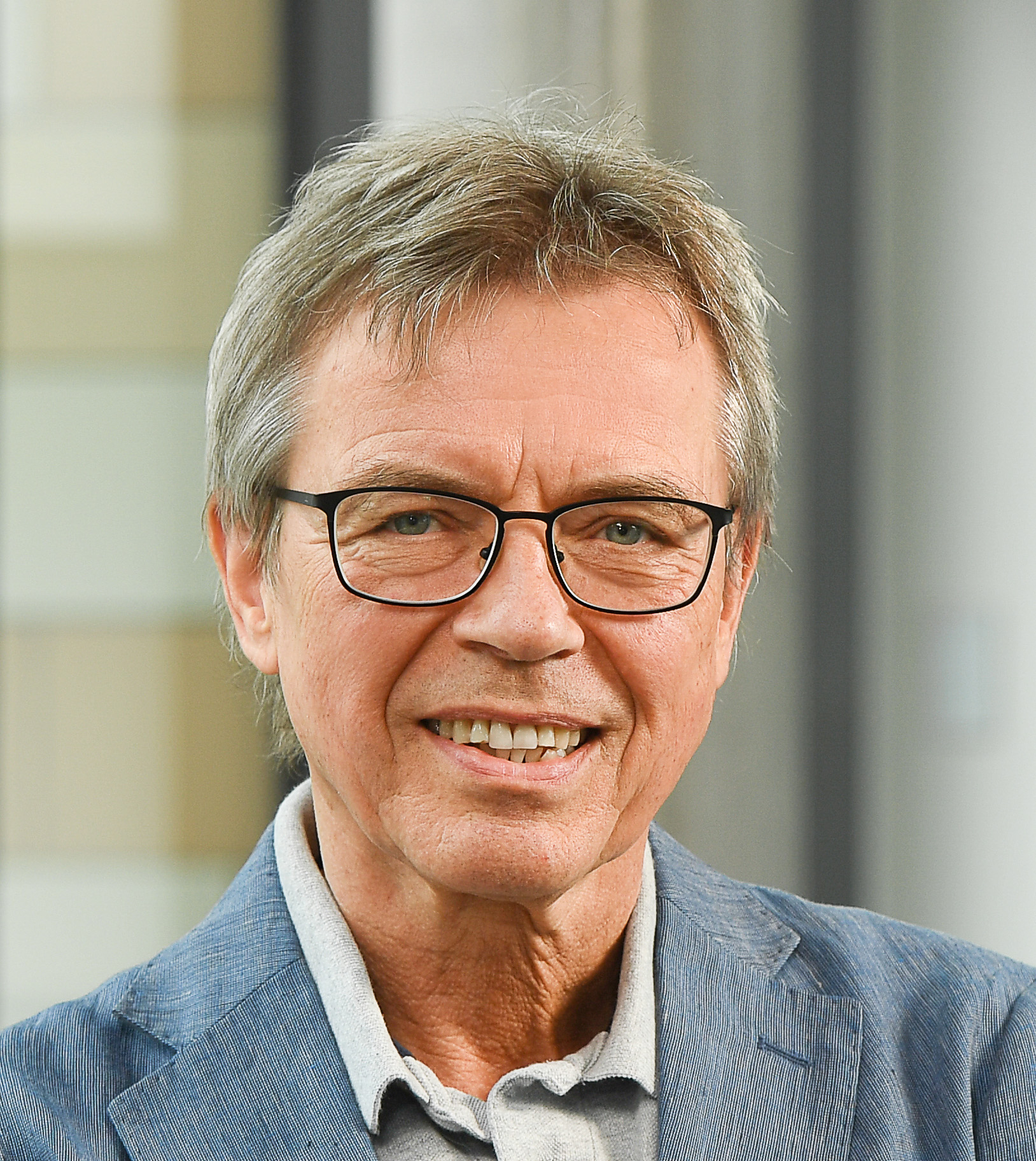
- Born: July 25, 1955 (age 71); The Hague, Netherlands
- Education: Leiden University
- Awards: Vilhelm Bjerknes Medal; 2019; Carl Friedrich von Weizsäcker Prize; 2025
- Scientific career
- Fields: Atmospheric chemistry, Atmospheric physics
- Workplaces: Free University of Amsterdam; Utrecht University; Stockholm University; University of California, San Diego; Wageningen University and Research; Max Planck Institute for Chemistry; Mainz University; The Cyprus Institute
- Thesis: The role of clouds in tropospheric chemistry (1990)
- Doctoral advisor: Paul J. Crutzen
- Website: www.mpic.de/forschung/atmosphaerenchemie/profil-jos-lelieveld.html

Johannes "Jos" Lelieveld (born July 25, 1955) is a Dutch atmospheric chemist. From 2000 until 2025, he has been a Scientific Member of the Max Planck Society and director of the Atmospheric Chemistry Department at the Max Planck Institute for Chemistry in Mainz. He is also professor at the University of Mainz and at the Cyprus Institute in Nicosia.

== Biography ==
Lelieveld studied biology at the Leiden University, the Netherlands. He graduated at the University of Leiden from the faculty of Mathematics and Natural Sciences, and the Free University of Amsterdam, in 1984 and received his Ph.D. from the faculty of Physics and Astronomy at the Utrecht University in 1990. His doctoral supervisor was Nobel laureate Paul J. Crutzen and his thesis was entitled "The role of clouds in tropospheric chemistry".

From 1984 until 1987 he worked as a research assistant at Geosens B.V. in Rotterdam to investigate transboundary air pollution. Subsequently, he became research scientist at the Atmospheric Chemistry Department of the Max Planck Institute for Chemistry (MPIC) in Mainz from 1987–1993.

In 1991, he was visiting scientist at the International Meteorological Institute at the University of Stockholm, followed by a stay at the Scripps Institution of Oceanography, University of California, San Diego in 1992. In 1993 Lelieveld returned to the Netherlands, accepting a professorship in “Air Quality” at Wageningen University. From 1996 to 2000 he was professor in “Atmospheric Physics and Chemistry” at University of Utrecht. In 1997 he became founding director of the international research school COACh (Cooperation on Oceanic, Atmospheric and climate Change studies).

In 2000, Jos Lelieveld returned to the Max Planck Institute for Chemistry in Mainz as scientific member of the Max Planck Society and director, succeeding Paul J. Crutzen as director of the Atmospheric Chemistry Department. Since 2000 he is spokesperson of the Paul Crutzen Graduate School (PCGS) on Atmospheric Chemistry and Physics in Mainz and since 2008 he is co-affiliated at the Cyprus Institute in Nicosia. He is co/author of over 400 publications, co-editor of several scientific journals, as well as member of various international committees. In 2015 he was elected as member of the German National Academy of Sciences Leopoldina., in 2016 he received an honorary doctorate and professorship from the University of Crete, and was elected as member of the International Silk Road Academy of Sciences, China. In 2017 he was appointed Fellow of the Royal Society of Chemistry, and in 2018 Fellow of the American Geophysical Union. In 2019, he was awarded the Vilhelm Bjerknes Medal of the European Geosciences Union. In 2025, he was awarded the Carl Friedrich von Weizsäcker Prize by the Leopoldina and the Stifterverband.

== Research ==
Jos Lelieveld's department focuses on photo-oxidation mechanisms, which play a central role in the self-cleaning capacity of the atmosphere. With the help of self-developed highly sensitive instrumentation to measure trace gases, including reactive radicals that occur in minute amounts in ambient air, to uncover the photochemical reaction chains. He and his group have specialized in the construction of new instrumentation for application on aircraft. Fast laser-optical, mass spectrometric and relatively fast gas chromatographic techniques, for example, are used to determine the key oxidants and breakdown products of hydrocarbons. The studies include laboratory investigations, field measurements on aircraft and ships, and the use of satellite observations. Also developing computer models to simulate the interactions of chemical and meteorological processes, and investigating the impact of atmospheric composition changes on climate and planetary health in the Anthropocene.

Jos Lelieveld coordinated major field measurement campaigns on atmospheric chemistry and climate ‘hot spot’ regions like the Indian Ocean, the Mediterranean, the Amazon and the Middle East. He found that the atmosphere's natural self-cleaning mechanism is effectively stabilized through the rapid recycling of highly reactive radicals, buffering the changes caused by natural and anthropogenic emissions. To study the interplay between atmospheric composition and climate, Lelieveld introduced the dynamic coupling of atmospheric chemistry in general circulation models. He showed that the increase of methane not only directly causes climate warming, but also indirectly through chemical reactions in the troposphere and stratosphere. His research uncovered how clouds and aerosols influence the chemistry of the troposphere, and showed that cloud convection has a major impact on tropospheric ozone. Lelieveld quantified the global impact of air pollution emission sectors on human health, identifying agriculture and residential energy use as important anthropogenic sources of particulate matter, next to the use of fossil fuels. Further, he showed the co-benefits of air pollution control on improving human health, reversing anthropogenically perturbed rainfall patterns and limiting global warming. His work on the Middle East and North Africa showed that the region is a global hotspot of climate change, weather extremes and air pollution, which could ultimately compromise human habitability. He was among the Highly Cited Researchers in 2021, 2022, 2023, and 2024.

Lelieveld has an h-index of 108 (Google scholar, As of May 2022).

== Selected publications ==
- Johannes Lelieveld; et al. (2019), "Effects of fossil fuel and total anthropogenic emission removal on public health and climate", Proceedings of the National Academy of Sciences (in German), vol. 116, no. 15, pp. 7192-7197, Bibcode:2019PNAS..116.7192L, doi:10.1073/pnas.1819989116, PMC 6462052, PMID 30910976
- Johannes Lelieveld; et al. (2019), "Cardiovascular disease burden from ambient air pollution in Europe reassessed using novel hazard ratio functions", European Heart Journal (in German), vol. 40, no. 20, pp. 1590–1596, doi:10.1093/eurheartj/ehz135, PMC 6528157, PMID 30860255
- Johannes Lelieveld; et al. (2015), "The contribution of outdoor air pollution sources to premature mortality on a global scale", Nature (in German), vol. 525, no. 7569, pp. 367–371, Bibcode:2015Natur.525..367L, doi:10.1038/nature15371, hdl:20.500.14279/9356, PMID 26381985, S2CID 4460927
- Johannes Lelieveld; et al. (2008), "Atmospheric oxidation capacity sustained by a tropical forest", Nature (in German), vol. 452, no. 7188, pp. 737–740, Bibcode:2008Natur.452..737L, doi:10.1038/nature06870, PMID 18401407, S2CID 4341546
- Johannes Lelieveld; et al. (2002), "Global Air Pollution Crossroads over the Mediterranean", Science (in German), vol. 298, no. 5594, pp. 794-799, Bibcode:2002Sci...298..794L, doi:10.1126/science.1075457, PMID 12399583, S2CID 1602767
- Johannes Lelieveld; et al. (2001), "The Indian Ocean experiment: widespread air pollution from South and Southeast Asia", Science (in German), vol. 291, no. 5506, pp. 1031-1036, Bibcode:2001Sci...291.1031L, doi:10.1126/science.1057103, PMID 11161214, S2CID 2141541
- V. Ramanathan; et al. (2001), "Indian Ocean Experiment: An integrated analysis of the climate forcing and effects of the great Indo-Asian haze" (PDF), Journal of Geophysical Research JGR Atmospheres (in German), vol. 106, no. D22, pp. 28371-28398, Bibcode:2001JGR...10628371R, doi:10.1029/2001JD900133
- Johannes Lelieveld; Paul J. Crutzen (1990), "Influences of cloud photochemical processes on tropospheric ozone", Nature (in German), 343 (6255), pp. 227–233, Bibcode:1990Natur.343..227L, doi:10.1038/343227a0, S2CID 4362994

== Videos ==
- Video: What are the Sources and Health Effects of Air Pollution?
