= Samia Moualfi =

Algerian politician

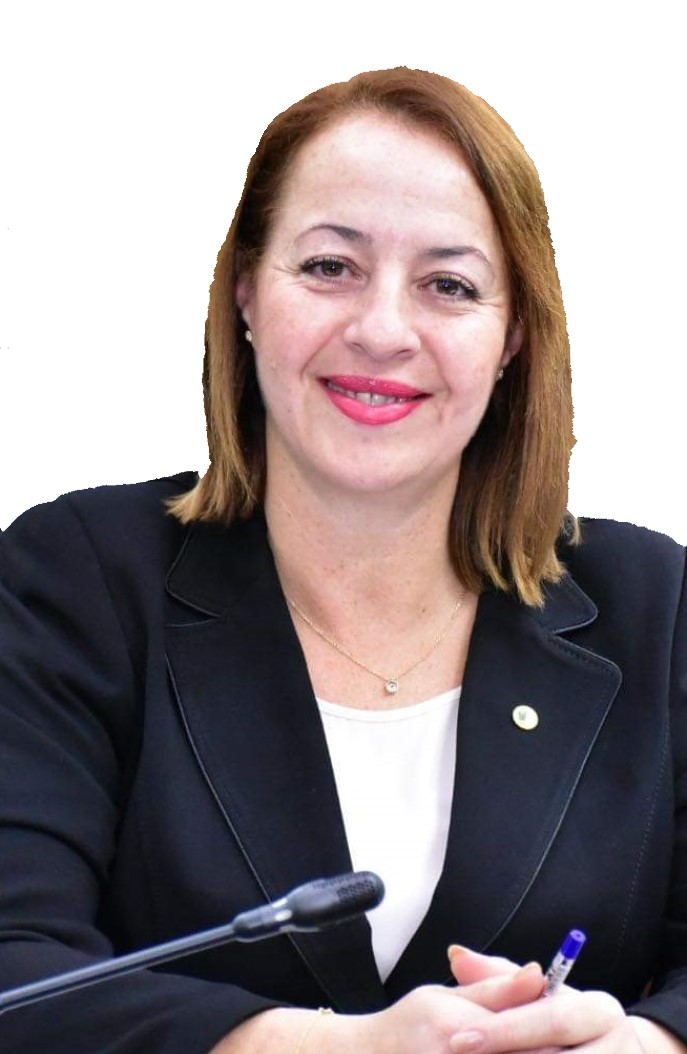

Minister of Environment and Renewable Energy
- In office 7 July 2021 – 16 March 2023
- President: Abdelmadjid Tebboune
- Prime Minister: Aymen Benabderrahmane
- Succeeded by: Fazia Dahleb

Samia Moualfi is an Algerian politician. Previously she had served as Minister of Environment and Renewable Energy from 7 July 2021 until 16 March 2023.

== Education ==
Moualfi holds a Doctor of Law in International Law and International Relations.
