= Climate change in Algeria =

Topographic Map Locator map

Climate change in Algeria has wide-reaching effects on the country. Algeria was not a significant contributor to climate change, but, like other countries in the Middle East and North Africa (MENA) region, is expected to be among the most affected by climate change impacts. Because a large part of the country is in already hot and arid geographies, including part of the Sahara, already strong heat and water resource access challenges are expected to get worse. As early as 2014, scientists were attributing extreme heat waves to climate change in Algeria. Algeria was ranked 46th of countries in the 2020 Climate Change Performance Index.

== Geography ==
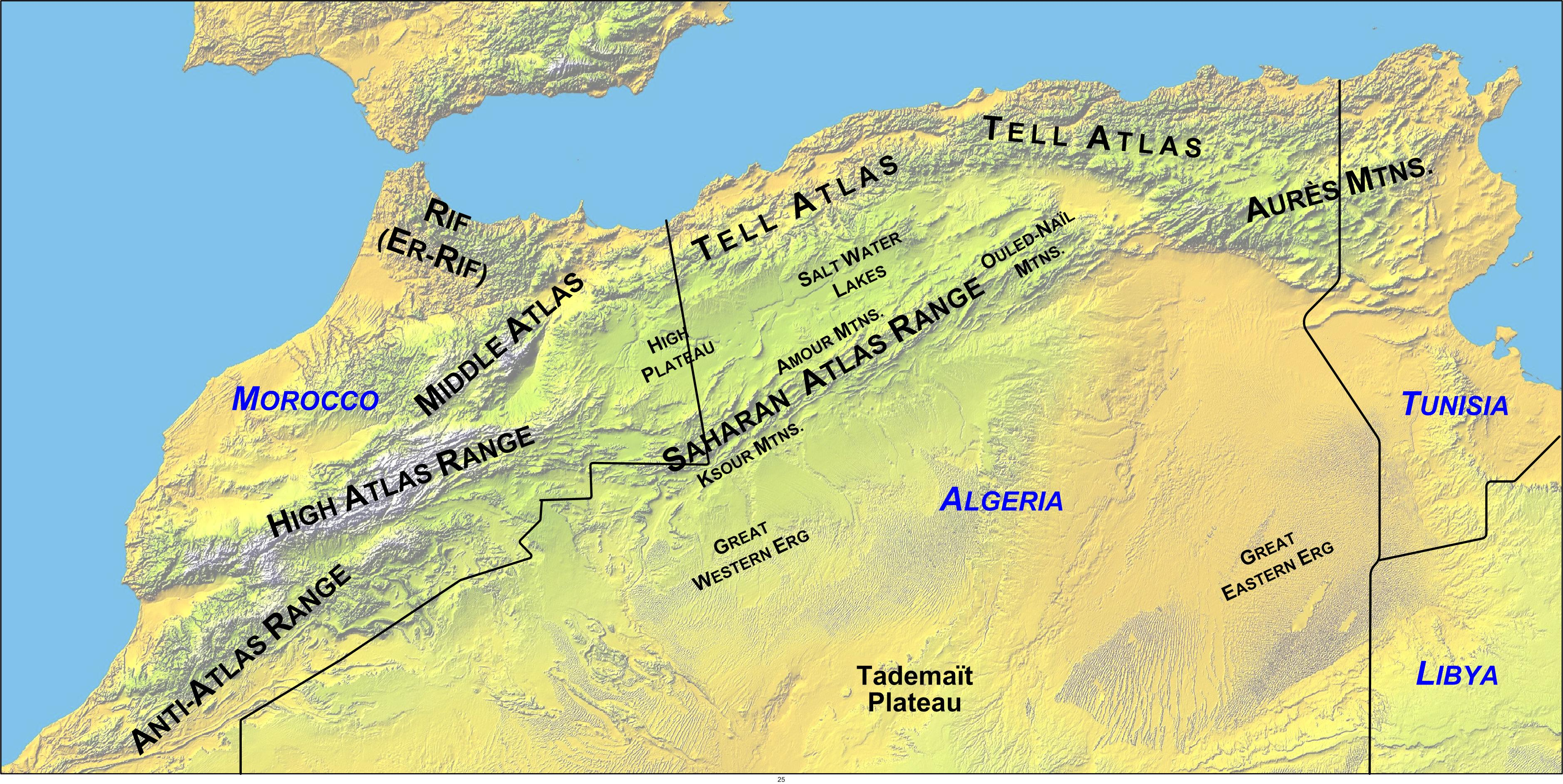
Atlas Mountains, Tell Atlas range

Algeria, the largest country in Africa, shares borders with Morocco, Tunisia, Libya, Mauritania, Mali, and Niger. These nations are situated in the Maghreb region, encompassing the desert areas of Northwest Africa along the Mediterranean Sea and Atlantic Ocean. Algeria has diverse landscapes, with the vast Sahara Desert dominating over four-fifths of its territory, particularly in the arid southern regions marked by expansive sand dunes and rocky plateaus.

To the north, the Tell Atlas Mountain range, a subset of the broader Atlas Mountains, runs parallel to the Mediterranean coast. This mountainous terrain significantly influences the country's climate and topography. The Atlas Mountains create a rain shadow effect, blocking rainfall to the Saharan desert that would otherwise be brought by westerly winds from the Atlantic and winds from the Mediterranean. Notably, about 90% of Algeria's population resides in the fertile coastal zones, which constitute around 12% of the total land area.

South of the Atlas Mountains lies the high plateaus, a predominantly fertile region known for its saltwater lakes called "chotts”. This region has unique wetlands that provide habitat and breeding grounds for migratory birds. The Saharan Atlas Mountains lie to the south of the high plateaus, running parallel to the Tell Atlas Mountains. It receives significantly less water than the Tell Atlas and high plateau, due to the rain shadow effect.

== Greenhouse gas emissions ==
Climate TRACE has estimated 2022 emissions at 350 million tonnes, emissions per capita are about average.

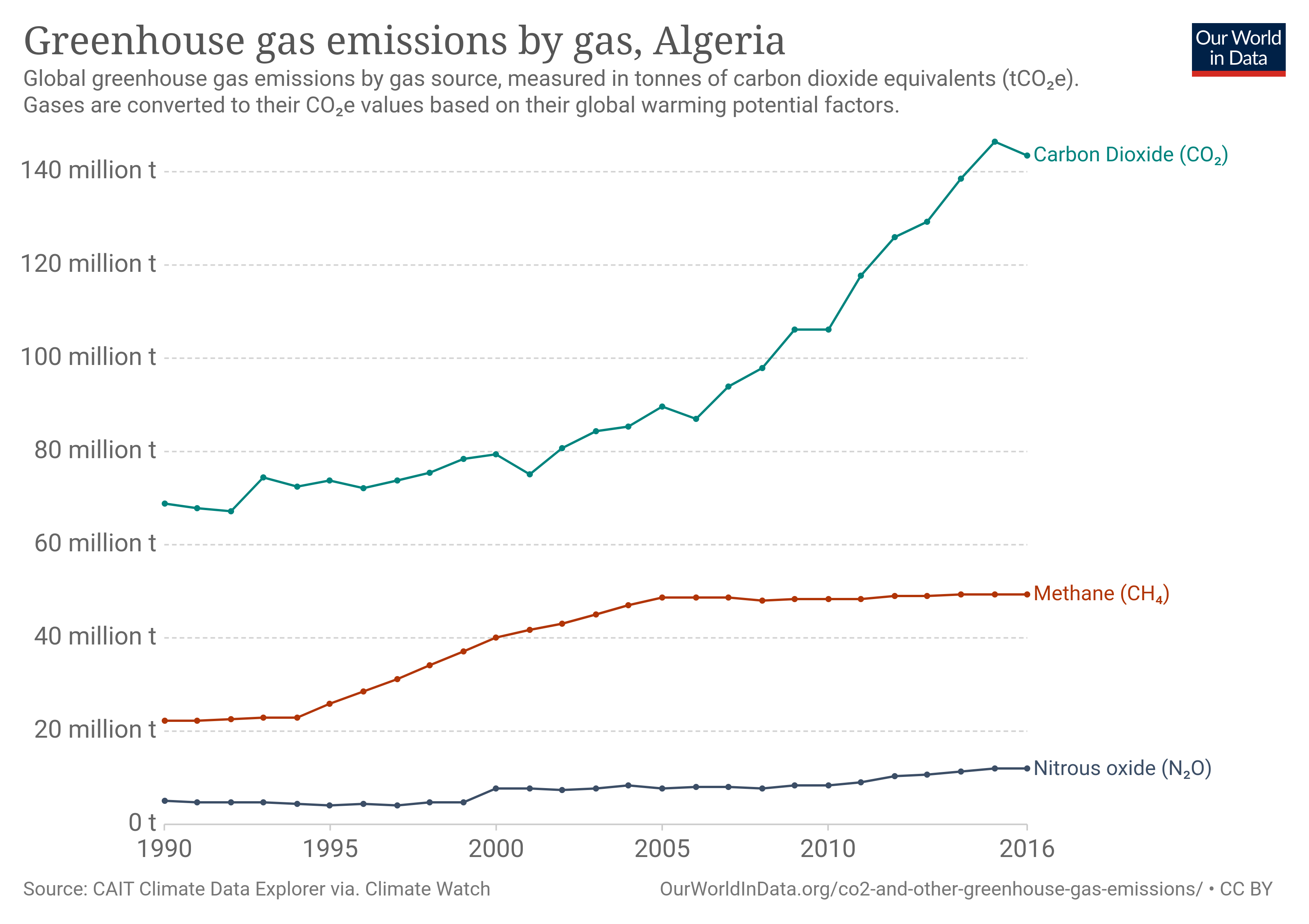
Algeria greenhouse emission of gas from 1990–2016

Algeria's economy relies significantly on its abundant reserves of oil and natural gas. The country possesses the world's tenth-largest proven reserves of natural gas and the sixteenth-largest reserves of proven oil. During the period from 2016 to 2021, the hydrocarbon sector contributed 19% to the gross domestic product (GDP), accounting for 93% of product exports, and represented 38% of budget revenues. Over half of emissions are thought to be from fossil fuel operations and power generation.

Algeria's climate policy emphasizes four broad priorities: strengthening institutional capacity, adapting to climate change, mitigating greenhouse gas emissions, and building technical and institutional capacity to support sustainable development.Algeria is working towards diversifying its economy by investing in renewable technologies. As of 2023 roughly 3% of Algeria's electricity comes from renewable resources.

== Impacts on the natural environment ==
=== Temperature and weather ===
Köppen climate classification map for Algeria for 1980–2016

2071–2100 map under the most intense climate change scenario. Mid-range scenarios are currently considered more likely.

Algeria has two distinct climates depending on the regions. In the Northern region, Algeria experiences a Mediterranean climate while in the South, it experiences a desert climate. The North, surrounded by the Tell Atlas Mountains experiences more humid winters and more exaggerated warm and dry summers. Most of Algeria is considered the Sahara Desert, which covers majority of the country, where average winters are as low as -20 °C and summers are as high as 45 °C. As climate change has progressed in Algeria, there have been large dry seasons, which has caused wildfires in the Mediterranean Region of Algeria. In July 2023, terrible heat waves have exacerbated the effects of fires, and this forest fire in particular had crossed the border between Algeria and Tunisia. This caused power outages and home displacement to Algerians, and decimated forests.

Algeria is projected to have less frequent rainfall, but an increase in precipitation intensity in the near future. Algeria's temperature expected to increase by -10°C from the date of 2013-2050. In correlation with these changes, Sea levels are also expected to rise 5–10 cm. Alergia is expected to have many issues with water quality, scarcity, agricultural issues, desertification, and changes to energy consumption and air conditioning functionality.

=== Sea level rise ===
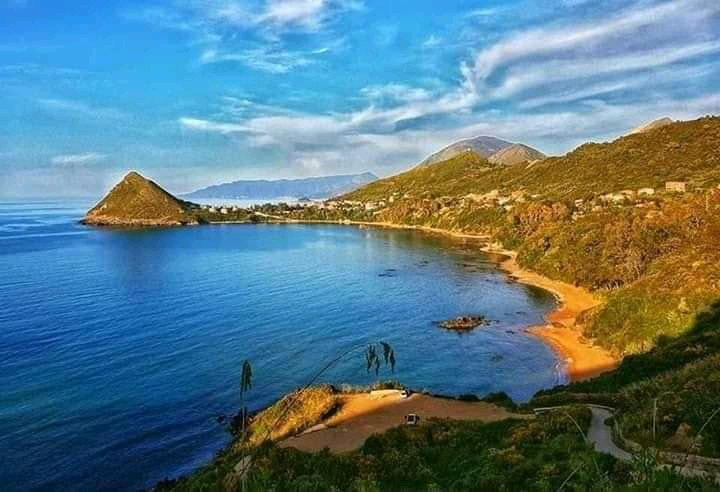
Algerian coasts

Algeria's coastline spans 1,600 kilometers along the Mediterranean, and with a significant portion of the population residing along these coastal areas. Algeria's coastal region faces mounting pressures from natural factors like seismic risks and erosion, tsunamagenic events. These impacts are compounded by human-induced issues such as pollution and habitat loss.

Coastal vulnerability to sea level rise requires assessment of both physical coastal vulnerability (e.g., coastal slope, tidal range, wave height, erosion rate), and socio-economic vulnerability (e.g., population density, cultural significance, infrastructure, land usage, and conservation status). A recent study assessing Zemmouri, northeast of Algiers, found that 24.58 kilometers (52%) of Algeria's coastline exhibited very high vulnerability to rising sea levels based on physical coastal vulnerability. Socioeconomic vulnerability indicators further identified 30 kilometers (36%) of the coastline as the most vulnerable areas. Another study assessing Bou Ismail Bay showed that 80% of coastal area in the Bay exhibits moderate vulnerability and 45% is highly exposed to coastal hazards. The risk mapping identifies 40% of the Bay at a high-risk level, signaling to policy makers the need for interventions to reduce sensitivity and bolster resilience.

=== Water resources ===
Algeria is categorized as water-scarce, along with 17 other African countries, falling below the theoretical scarcity threshold established by the World Bank of 1000 m3 (cubic meters) per capita per year. As of 2020, the theoretical availability of water per capita per year is 430 m3. Algeria has also been experiencing major drought events, which has greatly affected the water cycle in the region, as well as dam functionality by 25%.

=== Ecosystem ===
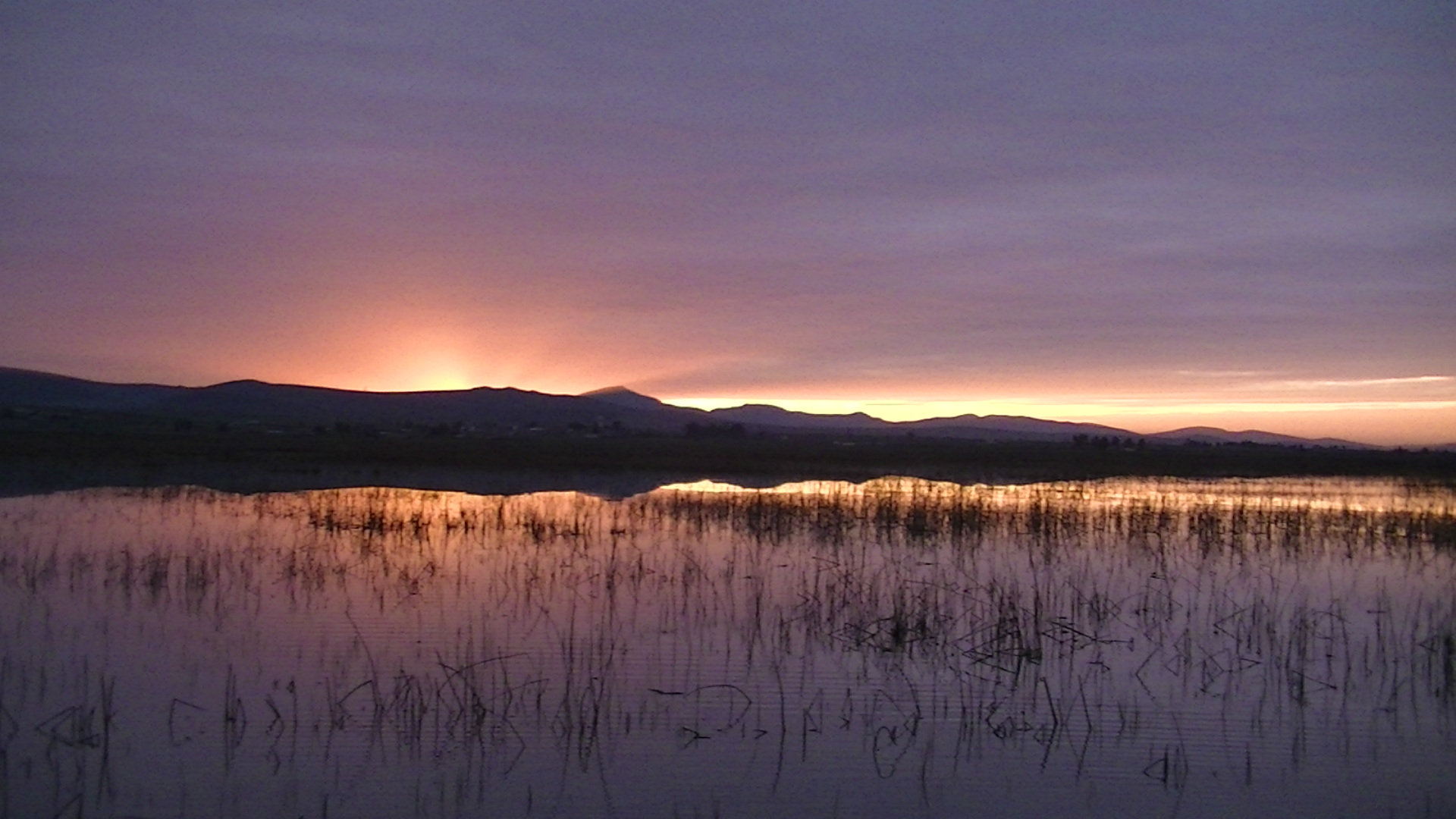
Fetzara lake

The decline in precipitation levels, coupled with rising temperatures and increased evaporation rates, has contributed to the desiccation of two significant wetlands, Fetzara and Halloula Lake. Eight species of birds once nested here, but have not been seen in the area, as the wetland habitat has undergone through major anthropocenic transformation in the recent two decades. The ecosystems in Algeria consist of temperate coniferous forests, woodlands, and scrubs, but almost all other terrestrial land consists of desert and desert associated ecosystems. Algerian forests cover approximately 4.1 million hectares and are composed mainly of Aleppo pine (68%) and cork oak (21%). Algerian forests faces several challenges including forest fires, overgrazing, agricultural expansion, and climate change that contribute to deforestation and degradation over time. Indeed, fires consume an average of 20,000 hectares of forest land in Algeria each year. Rising temperatures, unpredictable rain patterns, and longer droughts are likely to alter the cover and distribution of forests and trees over the next years. Studies already show that there has been a decline of Atlas cedar trees in Algeria.

The Northern Sahara lies in a steppe/woodland ecosystem, with rainy winter seasons and salty soil providing habitat for birds and reptiles. South Saharan steppe and xeric woodlands have rainy summer months as opposed to the North Sahara. Many grasses and herbs grow in this region, and summer rain helps sustain these species.

=== Precipitation ===
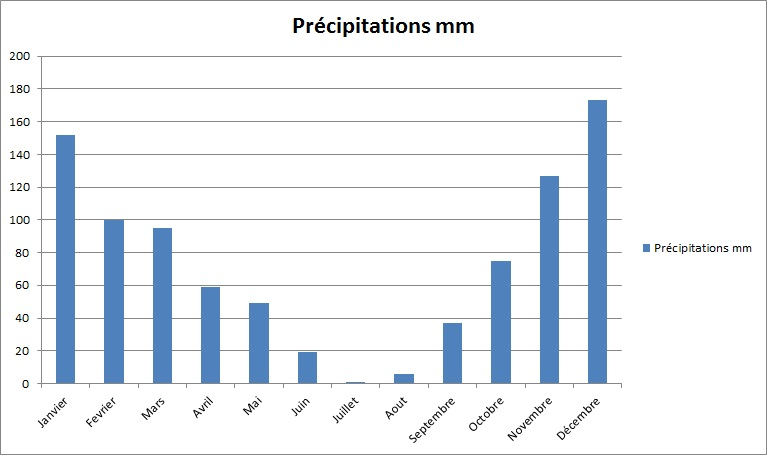
2014 rain patterns in Tarihant, Boudjima, Algeria

Algeria faces notable impacts, due to changes in precipitation patterns, particularly in Northwestern regions. Over the last century, this area has witnessed a consistent reduction in annual rainfall, coupled with a significant temperature rise. Recent IPCC reports suggest that rainfall events will become less frequent but more intense, with prolonged and common droughts. These shifts in the spatial and temporal distribution of precipitation will directly impact agriculture and water resources.

Northwestern Algeria, is highly susceptible to the impacts of climate change. A recent study about Tafna Basin in Algeria (7245 km2) analyzed rainfall and runoff data, and revealed a significant decline in annual rainfall since the 1980s. This change led to a decrease in rainfall ranging from 8.21% to 38.85% across stations, averaging 17.85%. Another study in the same basin found that the average water volumes mobilized by aquifers dropped significantly, ranging from 11.38 to 3.62 hm^3 before and after 1987, with an average decrease of -69.06%. These findings suggest a substantial decline in groundwater resources post-1987, emphasizing the impact of climate change on water availability in certain regions of Algeria.

In Northeast Algeria, another study scrutinized temporal trends across 22 rainfall stations from 1978 to 2010. The study revealed a seasonal delay that could potentially harm cereal crops and steppe rangelands in the plateaus, impacting vegetation. Furthermore, the study identified a discernible pattern of decreasing precipitation from North to South and from East to West.

=== Agriculture ===
A study investigating climate change's impact on durum wheat in Algeria anticipates varying declines in crop yields, from in some cases as high as 40%, depending on the sowing date and the specific location within the central northern region. For Algiers, in northern Algeria, the forecast suggests reduced rainfall especially during spring and summer. Conversely, Bordj Bou Arreridj, also situated in northern Algeria but farther east, is expected to see a notable increase in precipitation. There are also impacts about the timing of rainfall. Both regions are projected to experience higher rainfall in autumn. Yields in Algiers are expected to continue declining, while those in Bordj Bou Arreridj are likely to remain stable, mainly due to an earlier sowing schedule adapted to the changing climate.

== Mitigation and adaptation ==
Algeria ratified the Paris Agreement. In 2015, Algeria presented its first Nationally Determined Contribution (NDC), intending to reduce its greenhouse gas emissions by 7% to 22% by 2030 through energy transition and economic diversification. The 7% will be financed through national resources and the remaining 15% through the international financial channel. Algeria's NDCs aim to achieve a 9% reduction in electric energy consumption and strive to raise the share of renewable energy in electricity production to 22,000 MW, accounting for 27% of the total electrical generation by 2030. However, Algeria has yet to submit an updated NDC, long-term low carbon and climate resilient development strategies (LTS) and National Adaptation Plan (NAP).

By 2035, Algeria aims to install 15,000 MW of solar power.

Algeria has tried to expand renewable energy investments by making agreements with Germany, China, and the U.S for foreign renewable supplies. A plan to build at least 5 solar power sites across Algeria has been made, each within the capacity of 50-300 megawatts. Some international business from Germany, China, Italy, Egypt, Spain, and the UK have started investing in land for renewable energy in Algeria.

The 2020 Climate Change Performance Index (CCPI) characterized Algeria's policy approach as insufficient to meet the 2 °C goal. Algeria was ranked 48th in the CCPI, receiving a medium rating in the GHG emissions and Energy Use Categories, with very low ratings in Renewable Energy and Climate Policy.

== Impacts on people ==
In Algeria, 50% of non-irrigated agricultural lands are dedicated to cereal cultivation, particularly durum wheat. A decline in national meat and milk production has impacted their prices, leading to heightened demand for cereal products. Wheat serves as a primary protein source in the Algerian diet. With diminishing yields annually, Algeria's reliance on wheat imports has increased, resulting in an average yearly expenditure of $1 billion. These imports are funded by revenue generated from oil. As a result, food security in Algeria is significantly influenced by precipitation levels and oil prices. Anemia prevails significantly due to poorly diversified diets, affecting over half of children under 5. The impact of the food crisis is particularly acute among Sahrawi refugees, who were displaced from Western Sahara in 1975 following Morocco's territorial claim, leading to an armed conflict. Among Sahrawi refugees, 30% face food insecurity, with 58% at risk of experiencing food insecurity.
