= Sudanese coup d'état (disambiguation) =

Sudanese coup d'état may refer to:

- Coup d’etat in Sudan
- 2023 Sudanese coup d'état
- 2021 Sudanese coup d'état
- September 2021 Sudanese coup d'état attempt
- 2019 Sudanese coup d'état
- 2012 Sudanese coup d'état attempt
- 2008 Sudanese coup d'état attempt
- 2004 Sudanese coup d'état attempt
- 1992 Sudanese coup d'état attempt
- 1990 Sudanese coup d'état attempt
- 1989 Sudanese coup d'état
- 1985 Sudanese coup d'état
- 1977 Sudan Juba coup d'état attempt
- 1976 Sudanese coup d'état attempt
- 1975 Sudanese coup d'état attempt
- 1971 Sudanese coup d'état
- 1969 Sudanese coup d'état
- 1959 Sudanese coup d'état attempt
- 1958 Sudanese coup d'état
- 1957 Sudanese coup d'état attempt

== See also ==
- Sudanese Sovereignty Council (disambiguation)
- Transitional Military Council (disambiguation)
- Sudanese Civil War (disambiguation)
