= Health in Sudan =

Sudan, a country of about 52 million people, faces severe public health challenges shaped by decades of conflict, economic instability, and underfunded health services. Sudan has a predominantly young population, with a median age of 18.5 years (as of 2025). The total life expectancy for males and females at birth was estimated at 63 and 70 years, respectively, and this is considered the average for least developed countries.The under-five mortality rate declined from 128 deaths per 1,000 live births in 1990 to 77 in 2015 and 52 in 2025. The maternal mortality ratio was 360/100,000 in 2015 compared to 720/100,000 in 1990.

Sudan has a high incidence of debilitating and sometimes fatal diseases, the persistence of which reflects difficult ecological conditions, high levels of malnutrition, an inadequate health-care system, and conflict and violence. Sudan is also susceptible to non-communicable diseases, natural and manmade disasters. Drought, flood, internal conflicts, and outbreaks of violence are quite common, which bring about a burden of traumatic disease and demand for high quality emergency health care.

In 2018, the Human Rights Measurement Initiative estimated that Sudan was achieving only about 62% of its expected performance in ensuring the right to health, given the country's income level. Following the war in Sudan after 15 April 2023, many health facilities, staff and related infrastructure in the country have been severely impacted, with large sections of the population unable to receive health treatment.

== History of health care ==
The history of medical research and providing professional medical health care in Sudan can be traced back to 1903 when the Wellcome Research Laboratory was established in Khartoum as a part of Gordon Memorial College.

The reorganization of the services dealing with scientific research in Sudan in April 1935 made the Stack Medical Research Laboratories the official research organ of the Sudan Medical Service, and Dr. E. S. Horgan-Archibald's successor was appointed Director of the laboratories and assistant director (Research) Sudan Medical Service. The Wellcome Tropical Research Laboratories ceased to exist as such, but thereafter continued to operate as the Wellcome Chemical Laboratories. After being placed under the control of the Agricultural Research Service for the following four years, they were transferred back to the Sudan Medical Service in 1939.

Since 1969, the National Public Health Laboratory (NPHL) has been the country's major centre for medical education, training, and research. In the 2020s, the laboratory faced severe challenges during the Sudanese revolution and the 2023 Sudan conflict, forcing a relocation to Port Sudan due to war-induced destruction. Many health facilities, staff and related infrastructure in the country have been severely impacted, with large sections of the population unable to receive health treatment.

== Situation in the 21st century ==
Sudan, with an increasingly ageing population and high population growth, faces a double burden of disease, with rising rates of communicable and non-communicable diseases.

- The Sudan Household Survey 2010 showed that 26.8% of children aged 5 to 59 months had diarrhea, while 18.7% were sick due to suspected pneumonia in the two weeks before the survey was done.
- Protein energy malnutrition and micronutrient deficiencies continue to be a major problem among children under 5, with 12.6% and 15.7% suffering from severe wasting and stunting, respectively. The most common micronutrient deficiencies are iodine, iron and vitamin A.
- Concerning the MDGs, 73 [range: 59–88] (Both sexes) out of every 1000 children born do not live to see their fifth birthday. The Maternal mortality ratio per 100,000 live births was estimated at 730 [380–1400] deaths per 100,000 live births in 2010.
- The MDG target for malaria has been achieved, although it remains a major health problem. In 2010, malaria led to the death of 23 persons in every 100,000 population, while in total, over 1.6 million cases were reported.
- The annual incidence of new TB cases for 2010 is 119 per 100,000, half of them smear-positive. TB case-detection rate of 35% is well below the target of 70%, but the treatment success rate of 82% is close to the WHO target of 85%. With respect to AIDS, the epidemic is classified as low among the general population, with an estimated prevalence rate of 0.24%, and classified as a concentrated epidemic in two states.

In July 2011, South Sudan separated from Sudan and became an independent country.

== Statistics ==
Vital statistics (Note: These vital statistics include South Sudan.)
Period	Live births per year	Deaths per year	Natural change per year	CBR*	CDR*	NC*	TFR*	IMR*
1950–1955	452 000	233 000	219 000	46.5	24.0	22.5	6.65	160
1955–1960	510 000	251 000	259 000	46.7	23.0	23.8	6.65	154
1960–1965	572 000	268 000	304 000	46.6	21.8	24.7	6.60	147
1965–1970	647 000	281 000	365 000	46.5	20.3	26.3	6.60	137
1970–1975	737 000	298 000	438 000	46.2	18.7	27.5	6.60	126
1975–1980	839 000	317 000	522 000	45.1	17.1	28.1	6.52	116
1980–1985	950 000	339 000	611 000	43.6	15.5	28.0	6.34	106
1985–1990	1 043 000	361 000	682 000	41.7	14.4	27.3	6.08	99
1990–1995	1 137 000	374 000	763 000	40.1	13.2	26.9	5.81	91
1995–2000	1 242 000	387 000	855 000	38.6	12.0	26.6	5.51	81
2000–2005	1 324 000	373 000	951 000	36.5	10.3	26.2	5.14	70
2005–2010	1 385 000	384 000	1 001 000	33.8	9.4	24.4	4.60	64
* CBR = crude birth rate (per 1000); CDR = crude death rate (per 1000); NC = natural change (per 1000); IMR = infant mortality rate per 1000 births; TFR = total fertility rate (number of children per woman)

Ten leading causes of death (Note: Three different sources for the three different years, so not fully comparable. Furthermore, in 2011, Sudan was split into Sudan and South Sudan.)
2000		2010		2021	
Disease	% of total	Disease	% of total	Disease	% of total
Malaria	19.1	Septicaemia	7.0	Ischaemic heart disease	
Viral pneumonia	6.1	Pneumonia	5.5	COVID-19	
Malignant neoplasms	4.7	Other heart diseases	5.2	Preterm birth complications	
Iron deficiency anaemias	4.4	Circulatory system	5.0	Stroke	
Streptococcal septicaemia	3.8	Malaria	4.4	Lower respiratory infections	
Heart failure	3.6	Heart failure	4.1	Birth asphyxia and birth trauma	
Tuberculosis	3.4	Renal failure	4.1	Road injury	
Severe malnutrition	3.4	Malignant neoplasm	3.9	Malaria	
Meningococcal infection	3.2	Malnutrition	3.7	Measles	
Coronary heart disease	3.1	Diabetes mellitus	2.6	Congenital anomalies	

Life expectancy in years
Period	Life expectancy	Period	Life expectancy
1950–1955	44.5	1985–1990	55.1
1955–1960	47.1	1990–1995	56.0
1960–1965	49.2	1995–2000	57.6
1965–1970	51.2	2000–2005	59.4
1970–1975	53.1	2005–2010	61.5
1975–1980	54.0	2010–2015	63.6
1980–1985	54.5	2015–2020	65.1

== Health policies, systems and financing ==
The socioeconomics of Sudan began deteriorating after the separation of South Sudan. There is still conflict in Darfur, South Kordofan and Blue Nile states. Sudan's economy has suffered a great deal from this: first, from a fall in oil prices and, more recently, from the loss of revenue from South Sudan for oil transportation. In addition, there are continuing sanctions and a trade embargo. Due to these occurrences, funds for health have been cut, adding to the fragility of the health sector. In the past, the health financing system in Sudan has undergone several changes, from a tax-based system in the late 1950s to the introduction of user fees along with social solidarity schemes such as the Takaful system. The social health insurance scheme was implemented in 1995. The private sector also grew exponentially, leading to increased out-of-pocket spending from households. In 2006, free emergency care for the first 24 hours was announced, and the free finance policy for children under 5 and pregnant women was adopted in 2008. Sudan has also reviewed health system financing using the OASIS approach as a prelude to framing its national strategy for health financing. Also, the country has embarked on developing detailed roadmaps for providing universal health coverage to its population.

Health services in Sudan are provided by the Federal and State Ministries of Health, military medical services, police, universities, and the private sector. The districts or localities which are the closest to people are mainly pro policies. Plans in Sudan are produced at three levels: federal, state, and district (also called locality), providing primary health care, health promotion, and encouraging community participation in caring for their health and the environment. They are responsible for water and sanitation services as well. This well-established district system is a key component of the decentralization approach pursued in Sudan, which in turn gives a broader space for local management and administration and allows for overcoming the leadership and supervision efforts by superior bodies.

There is one Federal Ministry of Health (FMOH) and 18 State Ministries of Health (SMOH). The federal level is responsible for the provision of nation-wide health policies, plans, strategies, overall monitoring and evaluation, coordination, training, and external relations. The state level is concerned with state's plans, strategies, and work with federal guidelines for funding and implementation of plans. Meanwhile, the localities are mainly concerned with implementation and service delivery.

The Federal Ministry of Health, Ministry of Veterinary and Animal Resources, and Agriculture and Corps Ministry are members of what is called the Public Health Council, which is the main national legislative body providing regulatory instructions, particularly those regarding zoonotic diseases. A major product of this council is the Public Health Act of 1975. Nevertheless, states and localities are empowered to set their own regulations and laws based on their needs. Additional regulatory bodies are available, including the Medical Council and the Allied Health Council, which are in charge of doctors' and health providers' certification and licensing.

=== Health service delivery ===
A 2017 review of Sudan’s health system described the structure and performance of health service delivery at that time. According to this assessment, Sudan followed the classical three-tier arrangement of primary, secondary, and tertiary care. Primary health care (PHC) served as the first point of contact and included dressing stations, dispensaries, PHC units, and health centres, with the latter acting as referral points for the lower-level facilities. PHC was intended to provide essential services for the wider community. A standard service package introduced in 2003 covered childhood vaccination, nutrition, reproductive health, integrated management of childhood illnesses, treatment of common diseases, and provision of essential medicines, most of which were delivered through the public sector.

Secondary and tertiary care were provided by a mix of public and private facilities, although private services were concentrated mainly in urban areas. Secondary care encompassed screening, diagnostic, and therapeutic services in health centres and hospitals, while major surgery, rehabilitation, and subspecialty services were largely offered in larger public hospitals, including teaching and specialist hospitals. Patients could often access higher-level hospitals directly without referral, reflecting weaknesses in the referral system.

The 2017 review observed that the number of hospitals had been rising over the previous decade. Health promotion was identified as a key component of primary health care, but remained limited despite widespread health challenges such as communicable diseases, malnutrition, and non-communicable diseases. PHC services were under-utilised. At that time, about 81.6% of PHC units offered childhood vaccination and 67.3% provided family planning, figures that had improved over previous years but were still below recommended levels. The report also noted that while secondary and tertiary facilities had been increasing, the number of PHC units was declining, either because they had stopped functioning or were not keeping pace with population growth.

==== Impact of the 2023 conflict ====
Sudan’s health system was already fragile before the conflict, with very few doctors per capita and most services concentrated in urban areas. The war has further strained the system, as many health workers have been killed or displaced, medical supplies have run out, and the few hospitals still functioning face power cuts and severe logistical difficulties.

=== Regional disparities ===
It is difficult to generalize health care in Sudan because of the great disparity between the major urban areas and the rest of the country. Indeed, the availability of health care in urban settings is one cause of rural to urban migration. In terms of access to health care, Sudan can be subdivided into three categories: distinctly rural, rural near urban areas, and the capital region. In rural areas, especially outlying provinces, standard health care is completely absent. For the most part, there are neither doctors nor clinics in these regions. When illness occurs, home remedies and rest are often the only potential "treatments" available, along with a visit to a faqih or to a sorcerer, depending on region and location. Rural areas near cities or with access to bus or rail lines are slightly more fortunate. Small primary-care units staffed by knowledgeable, if not fully certified, health workers dispense rudimentary care and advice and also issue referrals to proper clinics in urban areas. Provincial capitals have doctors and hospitals but in insufficient numbers and of insufficient quality to meet rising demand.

The Three Towns of the capital region boast of the best medical facilities and doctors in the country, although many of these would still be considered substandard in other parts of the world. Here, health care is available in three types of facilities: the overcrowded, poorly maintained, and underequipped government hospitals; private clinics with adequate facilities and equipment, often operated by foreign-educated doctors and charging prices affordable only by the middle and upper classes; and public clinics run by Islamist da'wa (religiously based charities) or by Christian missionaries, where adequate health care is available for a nominal fee. Not surprisingly, many patients flock to the third category where it is available.

WHO maintained offices in the capitals of each of Darfur's three states in 2005 and oversaw the effort to provide health services there. More than 13,000 national and international personnel were involved in providing food, clean water, sanitation, primary health care, and medical drugs to the region's refugees. In 2006, some 2.5 million Darfuri were in need of assistance, and an estimated 22 percent of children suffered from acute malnutrition. One researcher reported that, as of 2011, reliable information on Eastern Sudan was scarce, but overall health conditions could be gauged from under-five child mortality rates per 1,000 live births. In 2005, WHO reported that these ranged from 117 in Al-Gedaref State, to 165 in Red Sea, to 172 in Blue Nile, all high even by standards of comparable developing countries.

== Communicable diseases ==
Poor sanitation and inadequate health care explain the presence of many communicable diseases in Sudan. Acute respiratory infections, hepatitis E, measles, meningitis, typhoid, and tuberculosis are all major causes of illness and mortality. More restricted geographically but affecting substantial portions of the population in the areas of occurrence is schistosomiasis (snail fever), found in the White Nile and Blue Nile areas and in irrigated zones between the two Niles.

=== Cholera ===
Cholera is mainly transmitted through polluted water and can cause sudden, severe diarrhoea that leads to rapid dehydration and death without treatment. The disease worsens malnutrition by draining the body of essential nutrients. This further weakens patients and creates a cycle in which malnutrition slows recovery and heightens the risk of prolonged illness. Cholera has been a recurring public health problem in Sudan, with outbreaks fuelled by conflict, deficient water, sanitation, and hygiene, and a poorly resourced healthcare system. Major recent outbreaks include one in 2017 that caused about 22,000 infections and 700 deaths in two months, and another in 2019–2020, when heavy rains and flooding contaminated water sources and triggered hundreds of cases across several states. As per november 2025, the cholera epidemic that started in 2024 is still ongoing.

=== Malaria ===
In 2000, malaria was the leading cause of morbidity and mortality in Sudan. Around three quarters of the population were considered at risk, and the country's unstable pattern of transmission made nationwide outbreaks possible, especially following heavy rains or flooding, or when control measures were disrupted. Children, people in the lowest economic groups, and residents of displacement or refugee camps were the most affected by malaria in Sudan, with prevalence about twice as high as in rural areas and three times higher than in urban settings.

Malaria commanded an inordinate amount of Sudan's limited medical expertise. In 2003, hospitals reported 3 million cases; malaria victims accounted for up to 40 percent of outpatient consultations and 30 percent of all hospital admissions. A 2007 study found that many malaria cases and deaths were not captured by the formal health system, leading to an overall underestimation of the disease's impact. Mortality and disability-adjusted life years (DALYs) were highest among children under five, confirming their particular vulnerability. Across all age groups, women accounted for more DALYs than men, a difference not reflected in incidence figures alone.

In the 21st century, several organizations launched global initiatives to control or eradicate malaria, leading to a worldwide decline in both incidence and mortality. Sudan also made substantial progress in bringing malaria under control. Malaria dropped from the leading cause of death in the country in 2000 to fifth place in 2010 and eighth place in 2021. Still, in 2023, out of a population of roughly 50 million, Sudan recorded an estimated 3.4 million malaria cases and nearly 8 000 deaths.

=== Measles ===
Measles is a highly contagious airborne disease that remains endemic in East Africa and continues to cause significant illness and death. Although vaccination can prevent infection, routine immunization in Sudan has faced major challenges, particularly among children, due to ongoing conflicts and gaps in information and vaccination coverage. Before Sudan introduced the measles vaccine in 1985, measles was the leading cause of death from vaccine-preventable illnesses among children under five. In 2003, Sudan's Ministry of Health estimated measles vaccination coverage at about 70%, though a joint WHO–UNICEF survey that same year found an overall rate of 57%, with substantial regional differences ranging from less than 1% in the south to full coverage in the east. In October 2003, an officially reported outbreak of more than 3,000 measles cases occurred, over half of them in Khartoum and White Nile State. However, WHO modelling at the time estimated that Sudan experienced more than 595,000 measles infections and 17,000 related deaths annually, indicating extensive underreporting.

A 2019 review noted that measles vaccination coverage in Sudan remained low, as years of conflict and chronic underdevelopment had left about 4.1 million vulnerable children exposed to measles and other preventable diseases. The civil war that began in 2023 severely disrupted Sudan's immunization system, causing vaccination rates to fall sharply and leading to frequent measles outbreaks, especially in areas hosting displaced populations. With limited access to healthcare, many cases went unreported and untreated, worsening the overall health crisis.

=== Diarrhea ===
A lack of safe water means that nearly 45 percent of children suffer from diarrhea, which leads to poor health and weak immune systems.

=== Yellow fever ===
The World Health Organization was notified by the Federal Ministry of Health of Sudan of an outbreak of yellow fever in 2012 which affected five states in Darfur. The yellow fever outbreak resulted in 847 suspected cases including 171 deaths. To reduce the spread of yellow fever, the World Health Organization worked with the Federal Ministry of Health in Sudan on a vaccination campaign that halted the outbreak.

=== HIV/AIDS ===
Sudan is considered to be a country with an intermediate HIV and AIDS prevalence by the World Health Organization (WHO).

The main mode of transmission worldwide is through heterosexual contact, which is no different in Sudan. In Sudan, heterosexual transmission accounted for 97% of HIV positive cases. As of January 5, 2011, the Adult(15–49) prevalence in Sudan was found to be 0.4%, an estimated 260,000 people were living with HIV and there were 12,000 HIV related annual deaths. A population based study was conducted in 2002 which estimated the sero-prevalence to be 1.6%. According to recent studies, the HIV and AIDS prevalence in Sudan among blood donors has increased from 0.15% in 1993 to 1.4% in 2000.

=== Polio ===
Sudan confirmed a case of wild poliovirus in March 2009. The country was later certified polio‑free by the World Health Organization in 2015, although it continued to be treated as high risk because of fragile health systems, population displacement, and frequent cross‑border movement that complicated surveillance and immunization efforts.

In November 2018, Sudan’s Federal Ministry of Health, working alongside the World Health Organization and UNICEF, carried out a targeted subnational vaccination campaign aimed at roughly 4.5 million children under the age of five, focusing especially on areas considered vulnerable to poliovirus reintroduction.

In 2022, Sudan reported 58 polio cases across 18 states, along with detections of vaccine-derived poliovirus in West Darfur and in wastewater from the Red Sea State. Wastewater samples continued to test positive in 2024, indicating ongoing transmission risk. The conflict starting in 2023 has severely disrupted immunisation services, with routine coverage falling from 85% to about 50%—and to around 30% in conflict areas—leaving many localities inaccessible and large numbers of children vulnerable to polio.

== Non-communicable diseases ==
=== Sickle cell disease ===
In Sudan, sickle cell disease was first reported in 1926 by Archibald. The disease is considered one of the major types of anemia, especially in Western Sudan where the sickle cell gene is frequent Sickle cell disease is the major haemoglobinopathy seen in Khartoum, the capital of Sudan. This may be attributed to the migration of tribes from western Sudan as a result of drought and desertification in the 1970s and 1980s, and the conflicts in Darfur in 2005. The rate is higher in Western Sudanese ethnic groups particularly in Messeryia tribes in Darfur and Kordofan regions.

=== Cardiovascular disease ===
The Federal Ministry of Health issues an annual health statistical report that includes data on causes of hospital mortality. Over the past decade, cardiovascular disease has been consistently reported in the top 10 causes of hospital mortality, with malaria and acute respiratory infections as the first two causes.

The SHHS reported a prevalence of 2.5% for heart disease. Hypertensive heart disease (HHD), rheumatic heart disease (RHD), ischaemic heart disease (IHD) and cardiomyopathy constitute more than 80% of CVD in Sudan. Hypertension (HTN) had a prevalence of 20.1 and 20.4% in the SHHS and STEPS survey, respectively. There were poor control rates and a high prevalence of target-organ damage in the local studies. RHD prevalence data were available only for Khartoum state and the incidence has dropped from 3/1 000 people in the 1980s to 0.3% in 2003. There were no data on any other states. The coronary event rates in 1989 were 112/100 000 people, with a total mortality of 36/100 000. Prevalence rates of low physical activity, obesity, HTN, hypercholesterolaemia, diabetes and smoking were 86.8, 53.9, 23.6, 19.8, 19.2 and 12%, respectively, in the STEPS survey. Peripartum cardiomyopathy occurs at a rate of 1.5% of all deliveries. Congenital heart disease is prevalent in 0.2% of children.

=== Diabetes ===
In Sudan, the national prevalence of diabetes in adults is 7.7% and is expected to reach 10.8% in 2035. There were over 2.247.000 cases of diabetes in Sudan in 2017.

=== Malnutrition ===
On 20 June 2022, according to an analysis on food security in Sudan released by the Integrated Food Security Phase Classification (IPC), it was assessed that nearly a quarter of the country's population (11.7 million people) faced acute hunger due to the increase in communal conflicts and other acts of armed violence, economic problems after the 2019 Sudanese coup d'état, the displacement of more civilians, and the arrival of more refugees from neighboring countries such as South Sudan, Eritrea, Syria, Ethiopia, Central African Republic, Chad, and Yemen.

In 2023, UNICEF reported that Sudan has one of the highest majority rates of malnutrition among children in the world. There are more than 3 million malnourished children, of which 611,000 are harshly wasted and at high risk of death.

== Levels and trends in under-5 and infant mortality ==
- In Sudan, under-five mortality declined by 43 percent (on average, 1.5 percentage points per year) between 1965 and 2008 - from 157 to 89 deaths per 1000 live births. Improvements in under-five mortality during this period were driven primarily by reductions in child mortality (deaths among children aged 1–5). Progress in reducing infant mortality was slower by contrast – falling from 86 to 59 infant deaths per 1000 live births – at a rate of 0.7 percent per year.
- Under-five mortality levels for Sudan are 30 percent lower than the average for Africa and 51 percent higher than the global average. Sudan's under-five mortality rate is at the average for low-middle income countries.
- Mortality among children is heavily concentrated during their first year. An estimated 65 percent of deaths occurring before the age of five, happen during infancy (before children reach one year of age) and approximately 33 percent of deaths occurring before the age of five happen during the neonatal period (in the first 30 days after birth).

== Maternal health ==
- Complications during pregnancy affect one in three pregnant women, and complications during labor or up to six weeks after delivery affect one in two pregnant women. Close to 50 percent of female deaths occurs during pregnancy, delivery, or two months after delivery. In this high risk setting, access to a continuum of effective antenatal, intrapartum and post-partum care for pregnant women is critical.
- In 2010, evidence-based maternal survival interventions (including professional antenatal and delivery care) covered 40 percent of women in need (up from 35 percent in 2006).
- Family planning and effective ante-natal care are among the maternal survival interventions with the lowest population coverage. In 2010, 11 percent of married or cohabiting women used some form of contraception. Unmet demand for contraception is particularly large among cohorts of women older than 30 years of age.
- Between 2008 and 2010, while 73 percent of pregnant women reported attending at least one antenatal check-up, only 14 percent of pregnant women reported obtaining an effective package of antenatal services including four antenatal care visits, an assessment for blood pressure, urine screen for protein, a blood screen for anemia and two doses of tetanus toxoid vaccine.
- Between 2008 and 2010, among women of reproductive age with a pregnancy, 73 percent of all births were delivered with the support of a skilled professional (births attended by a doctor, nurse midwife or village midwife) - up from 63 percent between 2004 and 2006. This increase in coverage was driven by an increase in the proportion of births delivered by auxiliary or village midwives. The gains in professional support during childbirth have benefitted women in rural and urban areas alike.
- As 75 percent of women reside in rural areas and births primarily occur in the home (in 2010, 75 percent of births occurred in the home), a significant challenge in this setting is to ensure women have access to emergency obstetric care if needed. Emergency care requires the availability of unscheduled 24 hour services close to the home. In Sudan, only one in five women delivers in a facility.

== Oral health in Sudan ==
Little data is found in the literature about oral health in Sudan before the 1960s. Studies conducted after that showed different results because they were carried out in different populations and clinical settings.

About 772 dentists were practicing in Sudan (2 dentists/ 100 000 ) in 2008. Dental services are included in insurance schemes with the exception of dentures, orthodontic treatments and plastic surgery.

=== Dental caries ===
==== Decay-missing-filled index ====
The decay-missing-filled index are indicators used to determine the status of dental caries. The table below is from a 1993 report on such data.

% Affected; DMFT; Preschool
Age	% affected	DMFT	D	M	F	Year
4–5 years*	42	1.68	1.62	0.03	0.03	1990

* A total of 275 pre-school children in kindergartens from Khartoum were studied.

% Affected; DMFT; different age groups - Khartoum state,
Age group	DMFT	D	M	F	Year
12 years (Khartoum State)	0.5	0.4	0.03	0.03	2007–08
16–24 years	4.2	2.9	1.2	0.1	2009–10
25–34 years	5.5	3.3	1.9	0.3	2009–10
35–44 years	8.7	4.1	4.2	0.3	2009–10
45–54 years	9.8	4.0	5.5	0.2	2009–10
55–64 years	12.2	3.9	8.0	0.3	2009–10
65–74 years	14.4	3.0	11.3	0.2	2009–10
75+ years	15.0	3.3	11.8	0.0	2009–10

=== Periodontal disease ===
% having highest score (CPI); Different Age groups
Age Group	Number of Dentate	0	1	2	3	4	Year
Age Group	Number of Dentate	No Disease	Bleeding on probing	Calculus	Pd 4–5 mm	Pd 6+ mm	Year
15 years	160	45	23	33	0	0	1990
15–19 years	126	0	1	0	95	4	1991
35–44 years	101	0	0	3	71	26	1991

=== Cleft lip and palate ===
This malformation showed a prevalence of 0.9 per 1000 in Sudan. More girls are affected than boys, with a male:female ratio of 3:10 (44% cleft lip with cleft palate, 30% only cleft palate, and 16% cleft lip alone).

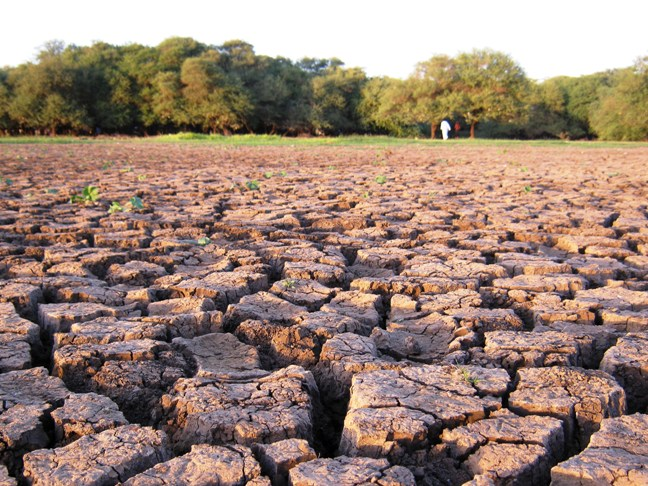
Drought in Khartum

== The impact of climate change ==
Global climate change influences overall health in Sudan, affecting various aspects of life and well-being. Over the last few decades, Sudan has experienced increased temperatures, irregular rainfall patterns, and a decline in overall rainfall. Extreme weather events such as droughts and floods have also impacted agriculture, water resources, and human health. Desertification has been accelerating, especially in the northern parts of the country.

The following points reflect the impact of climate change in Sudan on health:

- Increased temperatures and heatwaves: Sudan is experiencing rising temperatures as part of global warming. Common heat-related illnesses in the country include heatstroke and dehydration.
- Water scarcity and quality: Unpredictable rainfall patterns and prolonged droughts reduce the availability of clean water, increasing the risk of waterborne diseases like cholera and diarrhea.
- Food insecurity: Climate change affects agricultural productivity, leading to food shortages and consequent malnutrition. This issue has been prominent in conflict zones. The civil war in Sudan, which started in 2023, caused an economic crisis and a shortage of health services, exacerbating the existing problem.
- Vector-borne diseases: Changes in climate have expanded the habitats of disease-carrying vectors like mosquitoes. In Sudan, the incidence of diseases such as malaria and dengue fever has notably increased.
- Mental health: Climate-related disasters, such as floods and droughts, can lead to mental health issues, including anxiety and depression. The stress and uncertainty caused by insecure life situations can negatively impact mental health.

== See also ==
- Humanitarian impact of the Sudanese civil war (2023–present)#Healthcare and disease burden
