= Ahmed al-Omda =

Sudanese politician and officer

Governor of Blue Nile State
- Incumbent
- Assumed office June 13, 2021

Personal details
- Relations: Malik Agar (relative)

Military service
- Allegiance: SPLM-N (Agar) (~2006-2021); Sudan (2021-present)
- Rank: Lieutenant General

Ahmed al-Omda Badi (Arabic: أحمد العمدة بادي) is a Sudanese politician and officer currently serving as governor of Blue Nile State since mid-2021. He has overseen the deadly Blue Nile clashes between 2022 and early 2023, and has supported SAF commander Abdelfattah al-Burhan during the Sudanese civil war since its outbreak in April 2023.

== Early life and time in SPLM-N ==
Little is known about al-Omda's early life, although he is related to Malik Agar. In 2006, when the Sudan People's Liberation Movement split into the Sudanese SPLM-N headquartered in Blue Nile, al-Omda was appointed brigadier general over Joseph Teka. Omda sided with Malik Agar during the SPLM-N's split between Agar's faction and Abdelaziz al-Hilu's faction. In 2008, Agar appointed Omda to lead the fifth front of the SPLM-N in Blue Nile.

By 2017, Omda was the leader of the 2nd Front. That year, Omda launched several attacks that killed and injured refugees in Blue Nile and along the South Sudanese border.

In 2020, Omda signed a peace agreement between Agar's faction of SPLM-N and the Sudanese transitional government, mediated by South Sudan. The agreement was part of the wider Juba Peace Agreement to end the War in Darfur.

== Governor ==
Omda was appointed governor of Blue Nile State on June 13, 2021, by the Transitional Sovereignty Council, alongside Khamis Abakar of West Darfur. At his inauguration, Omda stressed the notion of building infrastructure and institutions to stabilize Blue Nile state from future wars.

In September 2021, Omda appointed Jamal Mohammed Saleh as the state's minister of finance, Rehab Ahmed Musa as the state's minister of agriculture, Farah ِAbbas Madani as the state's minister of animal resources and fishing, Nimri Ali Mansour as the minister of urban planning, Mohammed Alhassan Abdullah Youssef as the state's minister of education, Abdul-Azim Hassan Rizq as the state's health minister, Omar al-Faki as the minister of social welfare, Ali Jumaa Sabah al-Khair as the state's culture and information minister, and Daoud Idris Daoud as the minister of youth and sports.

Omda's administration over Blue Nile was relatively autonomous from the Sudanese government. In 2022, he urged reconstruction in Kurmuk.

At the onset of the Blue Nile clashes in July 2022, where Hausa and non-Hausa groups clashed and fourteen civilians were killed, Omda was unreachable by Sudan Tribune journalists and his spokesman refused to comment. He later ordered a curfew throughout the state and a ban on gatherings and unnecessary processions to quell the conflict. On July 29, Omda accused al-Hilu's faction of SPLM-N of inciting the ethnic conflict after al-Hilu criticized Omda's handling of the situation.

In October 2022, protests broke out in Wad el-Mahi against Omda's inability to end the conflict. Protesters in Ad-Damazin stormed the Blue Nile State Government Secretariat in the city and torched the building, demanding Omda be dismissed as governor and that Rapid Support Forces and Central Reserve Forces leave the state.

On February 6, 2023, Omda dismissed the governors of Wad al-Mahi Governorate and Qaysan Governorate.

When the Sudanese civil war broke out between the RSF and Sudanese Army in April 2023, Omda supported the SAF implicitly, although no fighting had occurred in Blue Nile state. Omda's state of emergency for Blue Nile state, which had been in effect since May 2022, was renewed in November 2023. In April 2024, Omda shuffled his cabinet. Omda publicly declared support for the Sudanese Army in May 2024, saying that "Sudan has the strongest army in Africa." During the Sennar offensive, Omda called for Blue Nile to accept refugees from Sennar.
