= Sextant (disambiguation) =

Sextant may refer to:

- Sextant (circle), a circular sector equal to one sixth of a circle, or a third of a semicircle
- Sextant, any of six groups of teeth in a human mouth, with 4 to 6 teeth in each sextant
- Sextant, a navigation instrument
- Sextant (astronomical), a non-reflecting astronomical instrument for measuring angles
- Mural sextant, a non-reflecting, wall-mounted astronomical instrument for measuring the altitude of a celestial object
- SEXTANT (Station Explorer for X-ray Timing and Navigation Technology), a NASA-funded project that will test XNAV on-orbit on board the International Space Station.
- Sextant (album), by Herbie Hancock
- Cairo Conference, held in Cairo, Egypt in 1943 codenamed SEXTANT
- Sextant (semigraphics), a 2×3 semigraphical pixel array in computing

== See also ==
- Sextans, a minor equatorial constellation
- Sextans (coin), an ancient Roman coin
- Sexton (office), an officer of a church, congregation or synagogue
