= Climate change in Sudan =

Köppen climate classification map for Sudan for 1980–2016

2071–2100 map under the most intense climate change scenario. Mid-range scenarios are currently considered more likely.

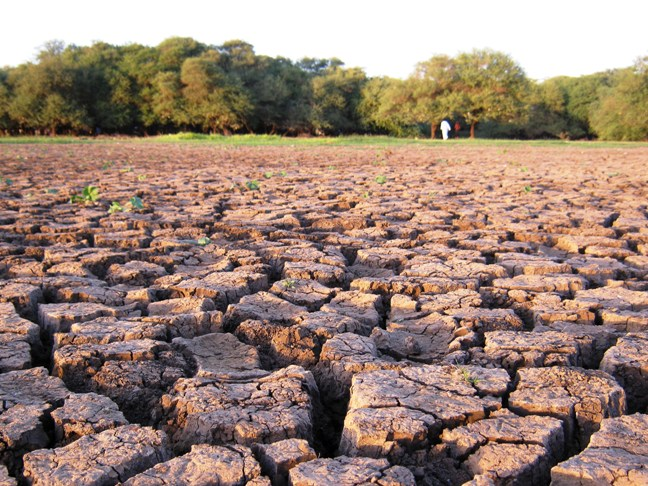
Drought conditions near Khartoum

In Sudan, climate change has caused an increase in temperatures, a decline in rainfall and driven desertification. Climate change poses significant challenges for rainfed agriculture and therefore the entire economy. Analysis of weather patterns suggest drought conditions and other extreme weather increased in Sudan during the 20th century. The relationship between climate change, water conflict and the war in Sudan has also been a topic of academic debate.

Blue Nile state has experienced significant impacts from climate change, being one of Sudan's fastest-warming regions. Moreover, there has been a 30-year decline in rainfall, which is becoming more irregular. Groundwater depletion has been observed Wad el-Mahi. Seasonal floods from the Blue Nile river and other streams have also worsened environmental conditions. Environmental degradation has been exacerbated by the excessive cutting of trees for charcoal production and improper handling of liquid and solid waste.

== See also ==
- List of Sudan floods
- Climate change in the Middle East and North Africa
- Climate change in South Sudan
