= Coups d'état in Sudan =

Aspect of Sudanese politics

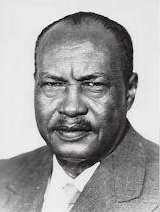
PM Khalil orchestrated a self-coup in 1958 with General Abboud

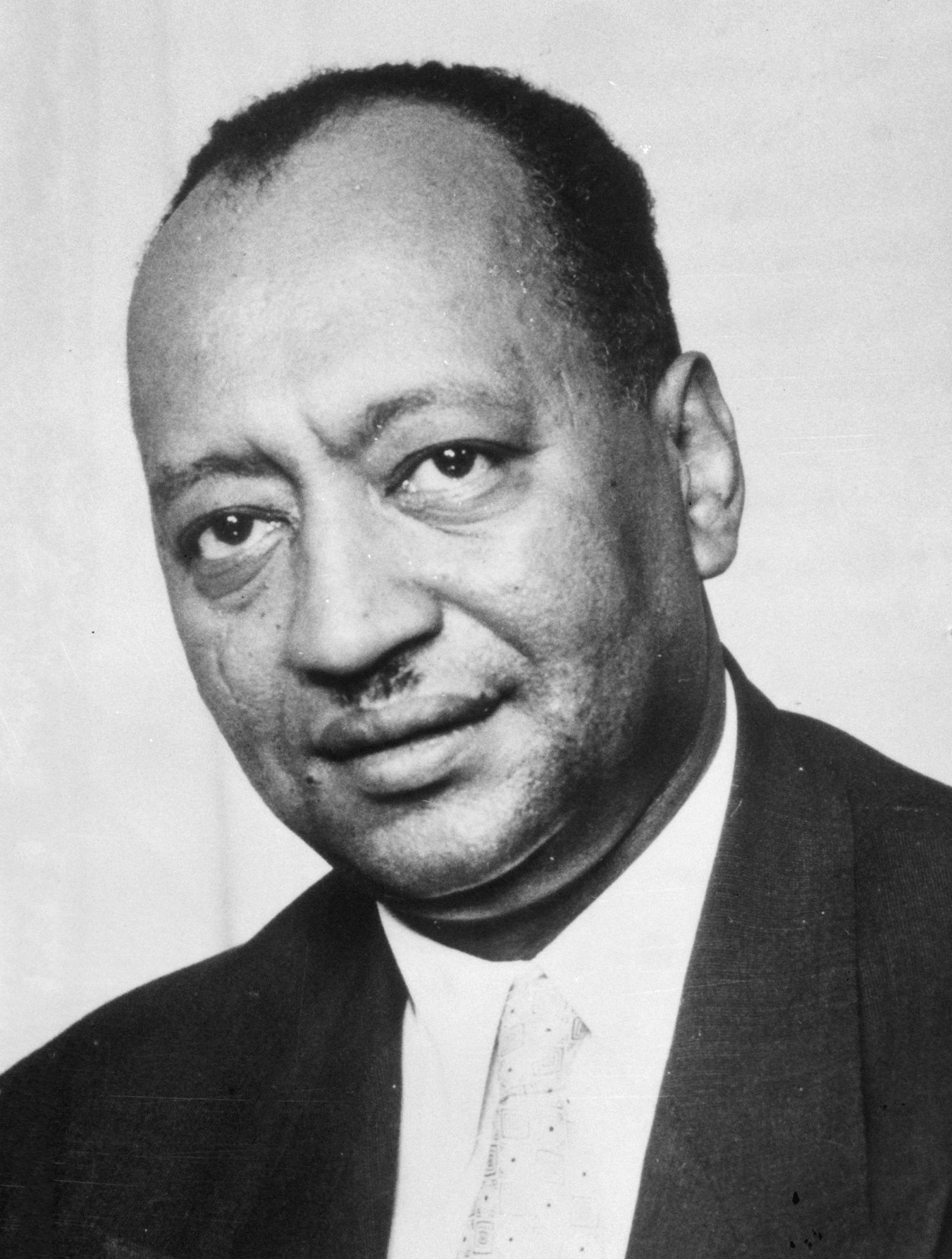
After a short period of democracy, the 1969 coup deposed PM al-Mahgoub

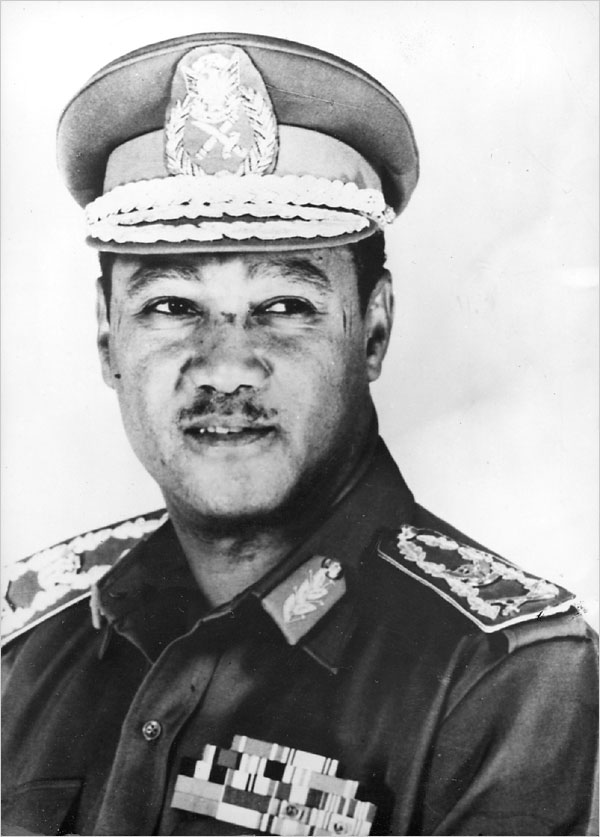
Nimeiry's 2nd coup attempt succeeded but he was toppled in the 1985 coup

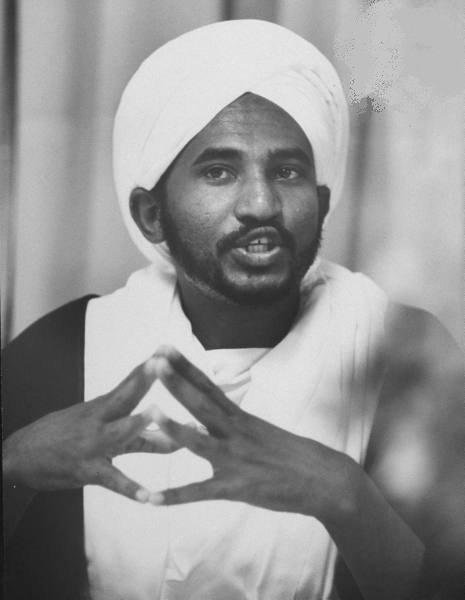
After a short period of democracy, the 1989 coup deposed PM al-Mahdi

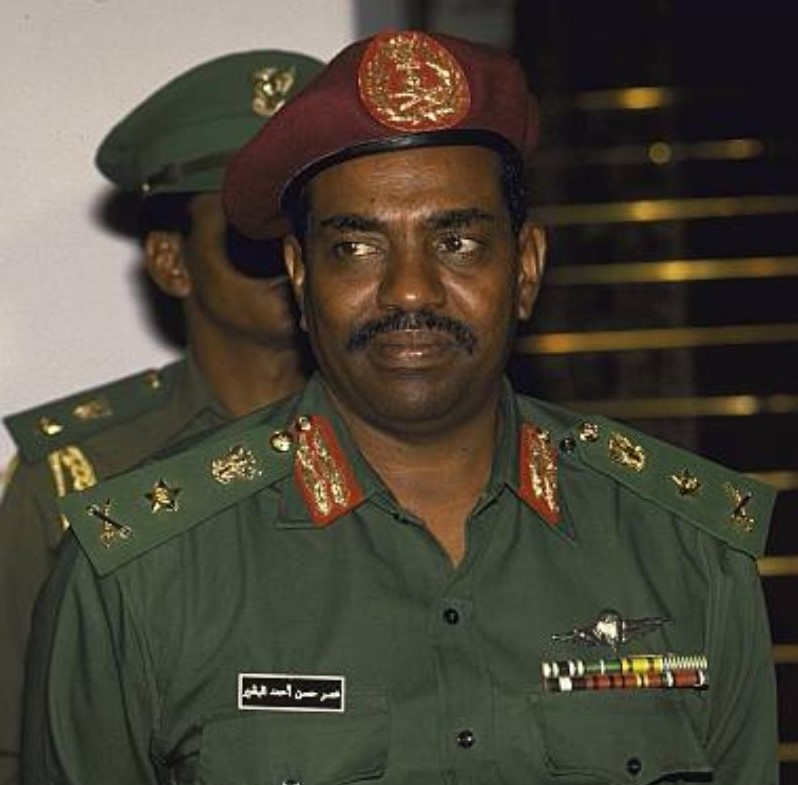
Al-Bashir's dictatorship after the 1989 coup lasted until the 2019 coup

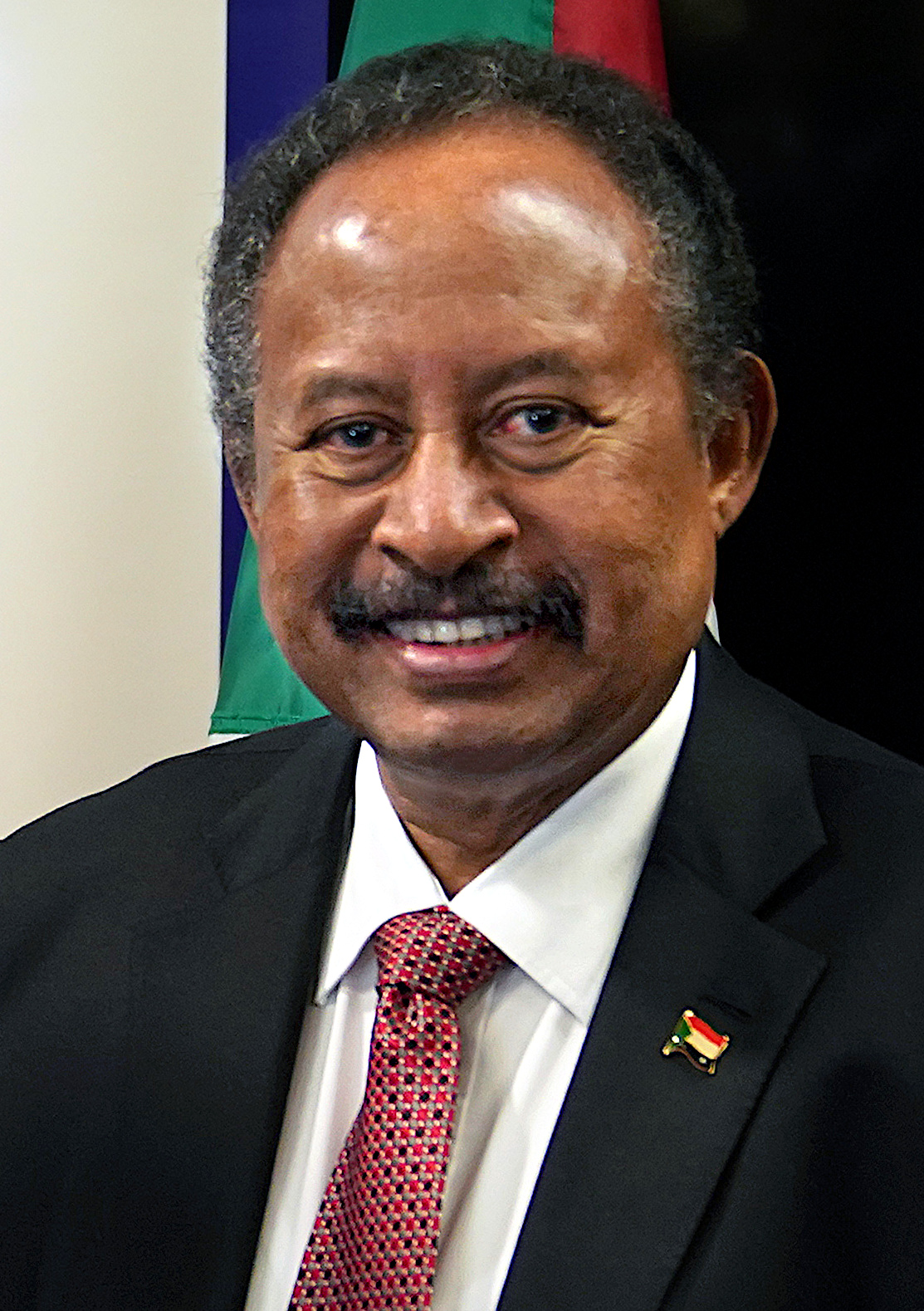
As Sudan transition to democracy, PM Hamdok was deposed after the 2021 coup

Since gaining independence in 1956, Sudan has witnessed a protracted series of coups d'état, totalling 20 coup attempts, of which 7 were successful, (Note: 18 coup attempts with 6 successful according to Voice of America, and 17 attempts with 6 successful according to BBC. Neither counts the 1966 and 2023 attempts and does not consider the 1971 coup d'état successful.) which places Sudan as the African nation with the most coup attempts and it ranks second globally, just behind Bolivia, which has recorded 23 coup attempts since 1950. This includes the 1958 self coup, the 1985 and 2019 soft coups, and 1957 and 1959 putsch.

In the latest development, the ongoing civil war began on 15 April 2023, involving clashes between the Sudanese Armed Forces and the paramilitary Rapid Support Forces, both factions of the military government, with a focus on Khartoum and the Darfur region.

== List of coups and coup attempts ==
Coups that were successfully carried through are shown in bold.

1. June 1957: One year after Sudan's independence, a failed coup led by Abdel Rahman Ismail Kabeida sought to seize power from the civil government. Jaafar Nimeiry, accused of supporting the coup, was arrested and later reassigned in 1959.
2. 17 November 1958: A bloodless self-coup was led by Prime Minister Abdallah Khalil against the civilian government formed after the 1958 election. It involved Khalil's National Umma Party, the People's Democratic Party, and senior army generals, Ibrahim Abboud and Ahmad Abd al-Wahab, with the knowledge of the United States and Great Britain. Khalil was subsequently retired on a pension. (Note: Following the 17 November 1958 military coup that brought General Ibrahim Abboud to power, internal power struggles occurred among the ruling Supreme Council of the Armed Forces. 15 March 1959 mutiny: Armed forces commanded by Brigadier Abdel Rahman Shenan threatened a mutiny, which led to a restructuring of the Supreme Council to favour Arab nationalists. 21 May 1959 mutiny: A further mutiny against Abboud by troops under Shenan occurred, leading to the arrest of several senior officers.)
3. 9 November 1959: A failed coup was orchestrated against General Ibrahim Abboud's regime. The conspirators, including Al-Rashid Al-Taher Bakr, faced trials, with some receiving death sentences, marking Sudan's first post-independence military executions. Abd al-Rahman Kabeida, who was involved in the 1957 coup attempt, was imprisoned until his release after the October 1964 Revolution.
4. 18 December 1966: a coup attempt by communists and a small army unit against the Sadiq al-Mahdi's government failed. Many communists and army personnel were subsequently arrested.
5. 25 May 1969: Colonel Jaafar Nimeiry successfully overthrew the government of President Ismail al-Azhari. The coup signalled the end of Sudan's second democratic era, and saw the beginning of Nimeiry's 16-year rule.
6. 19 July 1971: Major Hashem al Atta briefly ousted President Jaafar Nimeiry, but lacked support. Nimeiry's loyalists counter-couped, reinstating him. Nimeiry then strengthened his rule, diminishing the influence of former Revolutionary Command Council members by 1975.
7. 5 September 1975: Sudanese Communist Party-backed rebel army officers attempted a coup against President Gaafar al-Nimeiry, but loyalist forces quickly crushed the coup. Brigadier Hassan Hussein Osman, the coup leader, was wounded, court-martialled, and executed.
8. 2 July 1976: In early 1972, Nimeiry's dialogue with opposition leader Sharif Hussein al-Hindi failed. In 1976, a coup attempt by Sadiq al-Mahdi that was led by Muhammad Nour Saad was met with resistance, leading to a week of intense fighting and civilian casualties. A brief National Reconciliation followed but ended due to ongoing tensions and disagreements.
9. 2 February 1977: The Juba coup, led by 12 ex-Anyanya Air Force members, aimed to seize Juba airport but failed. High Executive Council members were arrested, and some sources suggest the group tried to free them from Juba prison.
10. 6 April 1985: The coup was staged by a group of military officers and led by the Defense Minister and Armed Forces Commander-in-Chief, Field Marshal Abdel Rahman Swar al-Dahab, against the government of President Gaafar Nimeiry.
11. 30 June 1989: The Sudanese Armed Forces overthrew the democratically elected government of Prime Minister Sadiq al-Mahdi and President Ahmed al-Mirghani. The coup was led by military officer Omar al-Bashir who took power in its aftermath; he ruled the country for the next 30 years until he was overthrown in 2019.
12. 23 April 1990: Allegedly orchestrated by retired officers and junior loyalists, aimed to overthrow the ruling military junta led by Lieutenant General Omar al-Bashir. Loyalist forces quashed the coup, with reported gunfire at key locations. Approximately 30 officers and retired officers were arrested.
13. March 1992: The attempt was led by Colonel Ahmed Khaled who was a sympathiser of the Sudanese Ba'ath Party. The coup was quickly crushed and the leaders of the attempt were imprisoned.
14. March and September 2004: The attempt was against the president Omar al-Bashir and his cabinet, inspired by opposition leaders and Hassan Al-Turabi. It ended with the arrests of army officers over the next few days. A second attempted coup was staged in September 2004.
15. 10 May 2008: Darfur rebel group Justice and Equality Movement raided Khartoum and Omdurman, killing over 220 people. It was the first time the Darfur conflict reached the capital, marking a significant escalation in a conflict that had already claimed up to 300,000 lives and displaced 2.5 million since 2003.
16. 22 November 2012: The coup against President Omar al-Bashir started as an attempt to overthrow the government over serious conflicts, upheavals (mainly the 2011–2013 Sudanese protests) and worsening conditions. 13 were arrested during the coup attempt, according to the media.
17. 11 April 2019: President Omar al-Bashir was overthrown by the Sudanese Armed Forces after popular protests demanded his departure. At that time, the army, led by Ahmed Awad Ibn Auf, toppled the government and National Legislature and declared a state of emergency in the country for a period of 3 months, followed by a transitional period of two years before an agreement was reached later.
18. 21 September 2021: The attempt was against the Sovereignty Council of Sudan. According to media reports, at least 40 officers were arrested. A government spokesman said they included "remnants of the defunct regime", referring to former officials of President Omar al-Bashir's government, and members of the country's armoured corps.
19. 25 October 2021: General Abdel Fattah al-Burhan staged a military coup in Sudan, detaining government officials and dissolving the Sovereignty Council. Protests and strikes ensued, leading to negotiations. A 14-point deal in November reinstated Prime Minister Abdalla Hamdok, but civilian groups rejected it, and Hamdok resigned in January 2022 amid continued protests.
20. 15 April 2023: Sudan witnessed an armed conflict between rival factions of the military, the Sudanese Armed Forces and the Rapid Support Forces, with clashes in Khartoum and Darfur. The SPLM-N led by Abdelaziz al-Hilu and other rebel groups joined the war.

== See also ==
- History of Sudan
- List of coups and coup attempts by country
