= Sudanese Sovereignty Council =

Sudanese Sovereignty Council (Arabic: مجلس السيادة السوداني), or Supreme Commission or Commission of Sovereignty, is a presidential council in Sudan that was formed for the first time in 1955. Since then, it has been dissolved and reconstituted more than once. Its most famous councils may refer to:

- Sudanese Sovereignty Council (1955–1958)
- Armed Forces Supreme Council (Sudan) (1958–1964); see 1958 Sudanese coup d'état
- Sudanese Sovereignty Council (1964–1965)
- Sudanese Sovereignty Council (1965–1969)
- National Revolutionary Command Council (Sudan) (1969–1971)
- Transitional Military Council (1985) (1985–1986)
- Transitional Military Council (2019)
- Transitional Sovereignty Council (2019–2021, 2021–present)

== See also ==
- Sudanese coup d'état (disambiguation)
- Transitional Military Council (disambiguation)
- Sudanese Civil War (disambiguation)
