= 1977 Sudan Juba coup attempt =

1977 Sudan Juba coup d'état attempt
- Part of the Sudanese Civil Wars and the Arab–Israeli conflict
Date	2 February 1977
Location	Juba, Southern Sudan Autonomous Region, Sudan 4.85°N 31.6°E
Result	Coup attempt fails

Belligerents
Sudan	Ex-Anyanya Members Supported by: Israel

Commanders and leaders
Gaafar Nimeiry; President of Sudan	Joseph Oduho; Benjamin Akok; Malath Joseph
- Location within Sudan.

A failed coup d'état attempt took place in Sudan on 2 February 1977. It was led by 12 Air Force members who had previously been members of Anyanya. The exact specifications of the coup attempt vary, although tend to focus on a failed attempt by the group to take the Juba airport.

The coup's political leadership, consisting of High Executive Council members Joseph Oduho, Benjamin Akok, and Malath Joseph, had been previously arrested, and some sources suggest the group attempted to storm Juba prison, to release the group's arrested leadership.

Harold Bowman, a 30 year old pilot with Africa Inland Mission was killed while driving passengers to the Juba airport during the shooting.
