= Blue Nile clashes (2022–2023) =

Clashes between Sudan and SPLM–N

- Part of aftermath of the Sudanese conflict in South Kordofan and Blue Nile
Date	July 13, 2022 – January 15, 2023
Location	Ad-Damazin, Ar-Roseires, Wad el-Mahi and other towns across Blue Nile state and surrounding states in Sudan
Result	Peace agreement signed between tribal leaders

Belligerents
Sudan; SPLM–N Agar; Hausa people	SPLM–N (al-Hilu); Forces of Freedom and Change; Central Council; Resistance Committees; El Roseires Resistance Committees; Funj people Berta people Hamaj sub-clan

Commanders and leaders
Abdel Fattah al-Burhan; Ahmed al-Omda; Hemedti; Malik Agar	Abdelaziz al-Hilu; El Obeid Hamad Abu Shotal

Units involved
Sudanese Armed Forces	Unknown

Casualties and losses
- Total: 600+ civilians killed, 211,000 – 235,000 IDPs; July clashes: 149 killed, 124 injured September clashes: 25 killed, 44 injured October clashes: 250+ killed, 500+ injured

In July, September, and October 2022, clashes broke out between the Hausa people and Funj and Berta peoples over land disputes in the Blue Nile State in southeastern Sudan, particularly the contentious establishment of a Hausa emirate in Blue Nile State. Over the course of several attacks and massacres, hundreds of civilians were killed up until the violence ended in January 2023. These clashes led to numerous casualties, mass displacement, and the imposition of a state of emergency in parts of Blue Nile State.

Blue Nile State harbours a diverse range of ethnic groups, including the long-established Hausa population, who faced historical discrimination and were often perceived as foreigners. Political dynamics, notably the actions of leaders like Malik Agar, played a significant role in escalating tensions. Agar's pursuit of power and alliances with the Hausa exacerbated ethnic rivalries.

The conflict witnessed over 600 civilian deaths and the displacement of 211,000 and 235,000. To mitigate future conflicts, the Sudanese government introduced measures to combat hate speech and racism. Tribal leaders also signed agreements aimed at ending hostilities.

== Background ==
=== Ethnic makeup ===
Blue Nile state is made up of several ethnic groups. The Hausa, originally from northern Nigeria, settled in parts of Sudan centuries ago to make Hajj pilgrimages easier. Hausas living in the area have had their own tracts of land granted to them by the British government in 1924, although discriminatory laws passed in 1948 made it difficult for Hausas to receive Sudanese citizenship, and subsequently made them unable to pass down the land to their descendants. Throughout independent Sudanese history, Hausas have been perceived as foreigners despite many Hausa families living in Sudan for centuries. In 1974, student protests against a peace deal that would end the First Sudanese Civil War involved many Hausa students. Supporters of the peace deal in Omdurman took the death of a Hausa protester as casus belli to launch pogroms against Hausa communities in the city. Many Hausa were expelled to Adré, in eastern Chad, although Chad deported them and forced Hausa refugees to settle in Darfur. Hausa in Blue Nile are often discriminated against to this day because they are considered "foreigners" due to their roots from West Africa.

=== Political background ===
In 1995, many tribes and civilians in Blue Nile state rose up against the Sudanese government, led by dictator Omar al-Bashir. The uprising was also against Blue Nile governor Abdalla Abu-Fatma Abdalla, who was close with the Hausas. Because of this, the Bashir regime began to favor the Hausa people in Blue Nile, as they perceived that the Hausa were more pro-government than the other tribes. During the beginning of the Blue Nile insurgency against SPLM–N in 2011, Hausa often joined the Sudanese Army and Janjaweed against SPLM–N and tribal rebels. However, some Hausa fought on the side of the rebels as well. In 2017, the leadership of the SPLM–N split between Abdelaziz al-Hilu and Malik Agar over control of insurgent activities in the Blue Nile. Tensions increased with the Hausa, who were accused of supporting the Agar regime who did not want a secular Sudan.

In 2020, Sudan underwent a revolution, toppling the Bashir regime and consequently increasing tensions between the Hausa and tribes of the Blue Nile. In late 2020, the Sudanese government and both factions of SPLM–N signed a peace agreement with the new Sudanese government, intending to end the conflict in Blue Nile. During the reconstruction of public services, groups like the Funj who had fought in the ranks of SPLM–N felt ostracized after Malik Agar gave government jobs, including Governor of Blue Nile, to people in his ethnic group, the Anqassana. As Agar's popularity began to decline, he looked for alliances with the Hausa to secure his and his tribe's positions in the Sudanese government.

In the aftermath of the coup d'état in 2021, Agar kept his position on the transitional council due to the stipulations in the Juba Peace Agreement, and "developed a good relationship with coup leaders Abdel Fattah al-Burhan and Mohamed Hamdan Dagalo." Funj tribal leaders heavily criticized Agar's closeness with the coup leaders, and launched protests and "resistance committees" against Agar.

=== Resurgence in land disputes ===
Political leaders and analysts all point the blame towards Malik Agar for the start of the new conflict. In an effort to gain support from other tribes, including the Hausa, and detract from waning support of the Funj, Agar appointed his relative, El Obeid Hamad Abu Shotal (an ethnic Funj), as the Supreme Chief for all Blue Nile Tribes. Abu Shotal then appointed a Hausa leader and then drew up the boundary for Hausa land. The new governor of Blue Nile, Ahmed al-Omda, granted a request for Hausa leaders to establish an emirate in Blue Nile state, on tracts of land owned by Hausa families. Al-Omda claimed on Sudan TV, the state-owned television network, that the crisis had also began in May 2022, when Hausa leaders demanded more inclusion in the Blue Nile regional administration. In response, Abu Shotal said "This [area] belongs to the tribes of Blue Nile, and you are our guest. How can you claim to be part of the native administration?" Around this same time, Abu Shotal imprisoned the Hausa chief after the latter banned Hausa girls from public markets. Factions of Hausa grew agitated with him. The Sudanese Communist Party claimed that in June 2022, weapons allegedly supplied by the Sudanese junta government made their way to Hausa tribemembers instead of attempting to defuse the situation.

In January, the Hausa people in Blue Nile began asserting their right to some land, which Funj and Berta leaders believed encroached on their ancestral lands. Berta leaders spoke out against the proposed emirate, although al-Omda and Abu Shotal granted the Hausa's request. The Funj, meanwhile, took the success of the proposed Hausa emirate as evidence that Hausa leaders were colluding with Malik Agar and the junta regime. Funj military elements and tribal leaders began conspiring ways to diminish Hausa power in the government and decrease reluctance on the central government.

== July clashes ==
=== First clashes (July 13–25) ===
On July 13, 2022, an outbreak of clashes began in the cities of Qaisan, Ar-Roseires, and Wad el-Mahi, in Blue Nile. The clashes involved Hausa on one side, and Berta and Funj on the other. Clashes began due to the killing of a young Hausa man near the town of Qaisan, during an argument between the Hausa and someone from either Berta or Funj. The fighting escalated the following day, spilling into the town of Qaisan itself and conflict in Ar-Roseires and Wad el-Mahi continuing. Blue Nile Governor al-Omda banned public gatherings and marches for a month in an attempt to quell the violence, but it did little. Al-Omda also declared a curfew in Wad el-Mahi and deployed soldiers on the ground from both the Sudanese army and Rapid Support Forces. The Sudanese army closed the bridge between Roseires and Ad-Damazin on July 15, preventing refugees from fleeing. All roads to and from Ad-Damazin were closed as well. Fighting also broke out in Ganis, but had subsided by the end of the night. The clashes spread to the Blue Nile capital of Ad-Damazin by July 16, and ended the same day.

The clashes on July 14 left thirteen people killed and sixteen shops torched, according to the Sudanese government. Initially, the government claimed 31 people had been killed, but this was later revealed to be a typo. The Central Committee of Sudanese Doctors rebutted this report, claiming that 23 people were killed and 84 injured in Ad-Damazin alone. The group also claimed they were unable to gather data from the Ar-Roseires hospital at the time. A sources at the hospital claimed that it had run out of equipment to treat injured people. The situation stabilized on July 17. According to Omar Saaed, the leader of the Sudanese Communist Party, several Hausa members went to the Sudanese Army base in Ad-Damazin, claiming that they received their weapons from Malik Agar and that they did not want war.

On July 20, despite measures from al-Omda and the Sudanese government in quelling the protests, violence broke out a second time, this time across more towns in Blue Nile. Adel Agar, the mayor of Ar-Roseires, claimed that the situation was not under control and he requested the help of the Sudanese government. Refugees from Ar-Roseires began fleeing into Ad-Damazin for safety. Dozens of refugees that fled to Ad-Damazin hid in schools, and massacres in small towns like Basuri and Allaouta were commplace. The clashes on July 20 were reportedly between Hausa and Hamaj, a sub-clan of the Berta. By July 21, the Sudanese government stated 105 people were killed in clashes across Blue Nile, and over 31,000 displaced from Ad-Damazin alone. Residents of Blue Nile and outside observers, however, claim the death toll was much, much higher. By October 6, the casualties of the July clashes were estimated to be 64,600 people displaced, 149 killed, and over 124 injured.

=== Aftermath of July clashes ===
OCHA confirmed on July 22 that they were able to deliver medical and humanitarian assistance to Roseires and Ad-Damazin after being unable to on July 20. The assistance aided 30,000 displaced peoples. The Central Committee of Sudanese Doctors (CCSD) claimed that the Blue Nile health ministry was "absent", and corpses were scattered about many streets in Blue Nile's towns. Activists claimed that the Sudanese forces and RSF deployed in the state neglected to pick up the bodies, and that markets in Roseires, Tamarin, and Ganis were looted.

The SPLM–N Agar faction and al-Omda accused remnants of Popular Defence Forces, Omar al-Bashir's paramilitary, to be behind the conflict, along with Abdelaziz al-Hilu's faction of SPLM–N. Political analysts and civilians, however, all overwhelmingly accused the Sudanese government and SPLM–N Agar of fueling the violence. Abu Shotal accused al-Omda and Agar of fueling the violence as well, blaming the Hausa.

=== Protests outside of Blue Nile ===
Protests spread throughout the rest of Sudan starting on July 18. In Kassala, the capital of the eastern Sudanese state of the same name, Hausa residents rioted and called for an end of the oppression of Hausa people. Kassalan authorities have also declared a state of emergency, as Hausa protesters burned down government buildings and offices. The protests in Kassala began when a large group of angry Hausa crossed the El Bash river in Kassala from the western part of the city to the eastern part. They burned down the town's education department and the state's petroleum department. The head government building, water supply, and trade administration were partially burned down as well. The Emirate of All Hausa Tribes denounced the violence in Kassala.

Protests also occurred in favor of the Hausa in the Sudanese capital of Khartoum, which were partially violent. In the state of White Nile, pro-Hausa protests were peaceful.

== August–September ==
Throughout August, hostilities in Blue Nile calmed down, and UN delegations arrived in the state and spoke with al-Omda. Leaders of Hausa, Berta, and Funj groups agreed to sign a ceasefire. Al-Omda, in response to the conflict, issued decrees changing the technical status of Ad-Damazin, Ar-Roseires, Wad el-Mahi, Bau, Qaisan, El Tadamon, and Kurmuk localities to governorates.

Clashes broke out a second time between September 1–4, killing 25 and injuring 44 in East Ganis and Roseires. Due to the violence, 21,000 people fled. The September clashes broke out between the Funj and the Hausa, and the cause was unclear. Most refugees sought refuge in Sennar.

== October resurgence ==
Major clashes broke out again in mid-October, primarily centered around the city of Wad el-Mahi. The clashes broke out on October 13, in the village of Dam. The conflict in Dam left 13 people dead, and 26 injured. Two of the dead civilians were Hamaji. The fighting initially began due to a local dispute, but escalating into ethnic tensions, developing a crisis in Dam village 6 and Dam village 7. Around 1,200 people, much of the population of the two villages, were forced to flee, and those that stayed had little food due to closed markets. The clashes occurred the same day that the SPLM–N returned several prisoners-of-war to the Sudanese government.

By October 14, there were rumors that members of the Aj Jabalaween tribe had kicked the Hausa from the two villages. The clashes made their way towards the city of Wad el-Mahi after a short lull between October 15 and 18, and by October 20, hundreds had been killed in the violence. Abbas Moussa, the head of the Wad el-Hami hospital, alleged 150 people were killed and 86 injured, whereas the UN estimated 170 were killed and 327 injured since October 13. Residents of the town reported heavy gunfire and the burning of homes and shops. By the end of October, it was estimated over 250 people were killed and injured over 500. Fath Arraman Bakheit, the head of the Blue Nile health ministry, claimed the real death and injury toll is unknown due to the inability for medical supplies or Sudanese forces to reach the area.

On October 21, the Sudanese government and Blue Nile regional government declared a state of emergency, and both governments declared the intent to organize a fact-finding committee. Protests on both ethnic groups began in Ad-Damazin calling for the resignation of governor Ahmed al-Omda. The protesters attempted to storm the army headquarters in Ad-Damazin before settinfg the state government building ablaze. Anti-al-Omda protests were present across other parts of Blue Nile, with protests in Kurmuk and Qaisan. Protesters also blocked the highway linking Khartoum and Ad-Damazin, in which three protesters were killed in skirmishes with police. In response, the Sudanese army sacked the general in command of forces in Blue Nile, Ramzi Babaker, and replaced him with Rabei Abdalla Adam.

Following the resurgence in attacks, Mohamed Moussa Ibrahim, the head of Hausas in Blue Nile, stated that there was a "relative calm" in the region, and that many of the dead were unable to be buried at the time. Humanitarian assistance was all but depleted, and many refugees were walking dozens of kilometers a day for refuge.

== Aftermath ==
In total, more than 600 civilians were killed, and between 211,000 and 235,000 were internally displaced.

The Sudanese government in Khartoum, in an effort to alleviate future clashes, introduced laws that would ban hate speech and racism. Raids under the leadership of SPLM–N Agar took place in Sennar state against Christians during Christmas, garnering criticism from SPLM–N Agar elements in Sennar. Protests calling for the resignation of al-Omda continued into December, with more support from leaders like Abu Shotal.

On January 15, 2023, leaders from the Hamaj, Berta, Hausa, Funj, Anqassana, Raqariq, and Watawat tribes agreed to cease all violence in Blue Nile state and have all territorial and ethnic disputes be resolved through the Tribal Administration. Sudanese leader Abdel Fattah al-Burhan, Blue Nile governor Ahmed al-Omda, and SPLM–N Agar leader Malik Agar all signed, with the only absence being Abdelaziz al-Hilu.
