= Internal conflict in South Sudan =

Internal conflict in South Sudan may refer to:

- Ethnic violence in South Sudan
- South Sudanese Civil War

== See also ==
- Sudanese Civil War (disambiguation)
