= Salah Gosh =

Sudanese general (born 1957)

General Salah Abdallah Gosh (Arabic: صلاح عبدالله قوش; born 1957) is the former national security advisor of the Republic of the Sudan. Prior to this position, he was the director of the National Intelligence and Security Service. He currently holds the rank of army general. Salah Gosh was reinstated to his former position as the Director General of NISS on 11 February 2018 by President Omar al-Bashir. On 13 April 2019, he resigned from his post, which was confirmed to Sudanese TV by the ruling Transitional Military Council.

== Early life ==
Gosh was born in 1957 in the village of Nuri, near Karima, but moved during his childhood to Port Sudan. He was good at mathematics, became involved in the Islamist movement, and went on to study engineering at the University of Khartoum. As a student, he provided Hassan al Turabi's NIF movement with information about the beliefs of various student activists.

After the 1989 coup, he joined the Islamist government and helped Al Qaeda establish their base of operations in Sudan during the early 1990s.

== War crimes ==
Gosh has been accused of having a significant role in organizing the Khartoum government's militias in the Darfur Conflict. According to the journalist Mark Goldberg, Gosh was "listed in a confidential annex to a January 30 Security Council report that identifies the 17 Sudanese individuals whom a panel of U.N. experts concluded were most responsible for war crimes and impeding the peace process." The panel recommended to freeze foreign assets and ban international travel for these individuals. Goldberg also described Gosh as "[the] personal government minder" for Osama bin Laden when the latter was in Sudan between 1990 and 1996. According to Sudan commentator Eric Reeves, the panel also accused Gosh of having failed "to take action as Director of NSIS to identify, neutralize, and disarm non-state armed militia groups in Darfur [the Janjaweed]," as well as for "command responsibility for acts or arbitrary detention, harassment, torture, denial of right to fair trial."

Gosh has also been a point of contact between the U.S. Central Intelligence Agency and Sudan on counter-terrorism issues. Gosh told the Al-Ahdath daily from Libya that cooperation with the U.S. "helped avert devastating measures [by the U.S. administration] against Sudan". The U.S. allegedly flew Gosh to Washington, D.C. in April 2005 to discuss capture of terror suspects. He was subsequently denied re-entry to the U.S. for medical treatment, but was issued a visa for travel to Britain.

In 2006, N’Djamena, the capital of Chad, underwent an assault by a rebel group which sought to overthrow President Idriss Deby Itno. In April 2008, the Chad government released a telephone conversation between Gosh and Chadian rebels in which Gosh asked for the prompt overthrow of president Deby.

After the ICC issued an arrest warrant for Sudanese President al-Bashir, Gosh supposedly threatened the "amputation of the hands and the slitting of the throats of any person who dares bad-mouth al-Bashir or support" the ICC decision.

In May 2009, Gosh was reported to have ordered the closure of the newspaper Al-Wifaq after an editorial called for the death of Yasser Arman, a leader of the Sudan People's Liberation Movement (SPLM). Some commentators, however, suggested that the death threat may have come from Gosh's office in the first place. In August 2009, Gosh was promoted to become the President Adviser for National Security affairs, and his deputy Gen. Mohamed Ellatta took his place to become the head of NSIS (National Security and Intelligence Service).

== 2011 Wikileaks documents ==
In November 2011 Wikileaks diplomatic cables showed that Gosh had viewed Bashir's indictment by the ICC as a liability and might have been willing to support a coup against him. In November 2012 Gosh was arrested along with other Sudanese for allegedly plotting a coup. He was released in July 2013 without being charged.

== Resignation and exile ==
On 13 April 2019, the Transitional Military Council (TMC) which overthrew al-Bashir released a statement to Sudanese television confirming that the country's leader Abdel Fattah Abdelrahman Burhan had accepted Gosh's resignation. In addition to alleged war crimes, Gosh had drawn criticism in Sudan for, among other things, overseeing the crackdown of protestors who opposed al-Bashir. On 30 May 2019, The North Africa Post suggested that Gosh had fled to Egypt after NISS forces blocked an attempt to arrest him.

On 14 January 2020, the Sudanese Armed Forces quelled a mutiny by soldiers loyal to ousted President Omar al-Bashir in the capital Khartoum. However, Salah Gosh was accused of orchestrating the mutiny, which left two troops dead.

On 16 December 2024, with implementation of Council Implementing Regulation (EU) 2024/3156, he was sanctioned by the European Union for being "involved in actions that threaten the peace, stability or security of Sudan and in actions undermining the efforts to resume the political transition in Sudan."
