= Wad el-Mahi =

Wad el-Mahi ود الماحي
- Location in Sudan (Blue Nile state highlighted)
- Coordinates: 11°29′7.6″N 34°38′21.3″E
- Country: Sudan
- State: Blue Nile
- City: Ad-Damazin
- Elevation: 508 m (1,667 ft)

Population (2022)
  - Total: 110,831
- Time zone: Central Africa Time, GMT + 3

Wad el-Mahi (Arabic: ود الماحي), or Wad al Mahi, is a locality in the Blue Nile State, Sudan. It has a population of 110,831 and was one of the main sites of the 2023 Blue Nile clashes.

== Geography and climate ==
In 2022, Wad el-Mahi, located in the Blue Nile state, has around 110,831 residents including 1,971 Ethiopian refugees. The locality is at an elevation of 508 metres (1,667 ft) above sea level. It is situated about 50 kilometres (31 mi) from the capital of the Blue Nile region, Ad-Damazin, and approximately 511 kilometres (318 mi) from Sudan's capital, Khartoum.

Wad el-Mahi has experienced significant impacts from climate change, being one of Sudan's fastest-warming regions. Since the 1970s, temperature anomaly have risen by 1 °C (1.8 °F) each year. Moreover, there has been a 30 years decline in rainfall, which is becoming more irregular. Groundwater depletion has been observed Wad el-Mahi. Seasonal floods from the Blue Nile river and other streams have also worsened environmental conditions. Environmental degradation has been exacerbated by the excessive cutting of trees for charcoal production and improper handling of liquid and solid waste.

There is another locality with the same name in Al Jazirah State, Sudan at 14°4'54.12"N and 33°28'7.68"E.

== History ==
In December 2017, the Governor of Blue Nile State Hassin Yasin Hamd announced the members of his new government and appointed Muhammad al-Mahi, commissioner of Wad el-Mahi locality.

In January 2020, Major General Yassin Ibrahim Abdel Ghani, acting governor of Blue Nile State, announced that his government is making efforts to address the problems of providing water due to draught in the area. He allocated 8 billion Sudanese pounds, with support from UNICEF, to rehabilitate Wad el-Mahi's water station, which covers a number of residential cities in the East Bank. In March 2020, Abdel Ghani initiated an electricity project in the Umm Darfa Al-Hilla area in the Wad el-Mahi locality. The Savings Bank for Social Development financed the electricity project at a cost of over 121 million Sudanese pounds, and its successful completion is expected to bring multiple benefits at local, state, and national levels. Abdel Ghani highlighted progress in addressing drinking water scarcity and the impending road construction toward the Ethiopian border. The project installed 400 high and low pressure electricity poles.

In January 2023, the Anti-Narcotics Department in the Blue Nile Region managed to apprehend a criminal network involved in transporting cash from Wad el-Mahi locality to the regional capital. Acting on information received by Police Colonel Adam Gedo, Director of the Anti-Narcotics Department, the group was discovered employing various tactics, including utilising remote and rugged routes to conceal their activities. A field team was dispatched to intercept the network, successfully ambushing them in the Marhab area. As a result, a significant quantity of hashish, known locally as bango (Arabic: بنقو), was confiscated by the police.

=== 2022–2023 Blue Nile clashes ===
In July 2022, the clashes in the Blue Nile flared up in the Wad el-Mahi locality due to a land dispute that erupted between the Hausa on one side, and Berta and Funj on the other. July's confrontations were partially triggered by these land conflicts and aggravated by political rivalries. This resurgence of violence follows an earlier outbreak in mid-July, where intercommunal clashes claimed numerous lives and forced thousands to flee to safer areas. The conflict's humanitarian impact has been severe, with approximately 235,000 individuals displaced and seeking refuge in makeshift shelters, including schools and nearby camps. The closure of markets due to the ongoing violence has left local residents in dire straits while trying to meet basic needs, as government offices remain shuttered.

The clashes have led to protests across Sudan, particularly among the Hausa community, who are demanding justice for the victims. These protests have also shed light on issues of racism and marginalisation, as the Hausa community in Sudan, belonging to the Hausa ethnic group from West Africa, have been perceived as outsiders in Sudan.
