= 1992 Sudanese coup attempt =

Coup d'état attempt in Sudan

In March 1992, a coup d'état attempt was led by Colonel Ahmed Khaled who was a sympathiser of the Sudanese Ba'ath Party. 11 military officers were arrested in the connection to the coup. Most of the coup leaders belonged to the Nuba ethnicity and the motivation for to coup was suspected to be sympathy for the Sudanese People’s Liberation Army (SPLA) fighting in South Sudan.

Members of the Democratic Unionist Party (DUP) and Sadiq al-Mahdi were arrested and accused to be connected the coup attempt. Sudanese authorities also accused Mohamed Osman al-Mirghani of providing financial support to the coup plotters.
