= September 2021 Sudanese coup attempt =

Failed coup against the Sovereignty Council of Sudan

September 2021 Sudanese coup d'état attempt
- Part of the 2019–2026 Sudanese transition to democracy
Date	21 September 2021
Location	Khartoum and Omdurman, Sudan 15°30′2″N 32°33′36″E
Result	Military coup d'état failed; Putschists arrested

Belligerents
Sovereignty Council of Sudan	Omar al-Bashir loyalists (alleged)

Commanders and leaders
Abdalla Hamdok	Unknown
- Location within Sudan

On 21 September 2021, officers failed in a coup attempt against the Sovereignty Council of Sudan.

According to media reports, at least 40 officers were arrested at dawn on Tuesday 21 September 2021. A government spokesman said they included "remnants of the defunct regime", referring to former officials of President Omar al-Bashir's government, and members of the country's armoured corps.

== Event ==
Sudanese Prime Minister Abdalla Hamdok revealed during a speech that the coup attempt was largely organized by loyalists of the ousted leader Omar al-Bashir. He added that the perpetrators involved in the failed coup were not only from the military but also outside the military as well. According to some Sudanese officials, soldiers attempted to take over a state media building in Omdurman, but they were subsequently prevented and apprehended. There were reports of gunfire close to a military base housing a tank division in Omdurman during the early hours of the incident, according to the BBC. Security forces reportedly shut down the main bridge connecting the capital Khartoum to Omdurman.

== Arrests ==
Dozens of troops who participated in the attempted coup d’état were apprehended. They were all believed to be loyalists of al-Bashir, according to Sudan's information minister Hamza Balul. Meanwhile, search and investigations were still ongoing for other perpetrators.

== Aftermath ==
Following the coup attempt, protesters gathered in Khartoum to denounce the coup, which they believe would be an obstacle to securing peace in the country. The Sudanese army managed to take over control of the areas that the culprits attempted to capture, according to Al Jazeera.

=== October coup ===
Another coup was launched by military forces on October 24, 2021, which resulted in the arrests of at least five senior Sudanese government figures. Widespread Internet outages were also reported.

== International reactions ==
The UN Secretary-General António Guterres criticized the coup attempt and urged all parties to stay focused on the transition, in order to secure political stability.
