= Transitional Military Council =

Transitional Military Council might refer to one Chadian and two Sudanese bodies:

- Transitional Military Council (1985), which overthrew Sudanese president Jaafar Nimeiry
- Transitional Military Council (2019), which overthrew Sudanese president Omar al-Bashir
- Transitional Military Council (Chad), which took power after the death of Chadian president Idriss Déby

== See also ==
- Military Council for other similarly named bodies
- Sudanese Sovereignty Council (disambiguation)
- Sudanese coup d'état (disambiguation)
