= Sudanese Civil War =

The term Sudanese Civil War refers to at least three separate conflicts, intermittently ongoing for more than 70 years, in Sudan:

- First Sudanese Civil War (1955–1972)
- Second Sudanese Civil War (1983–2005)
- Sudanese civil war (2023–present)

It could also refer to other internal conflicts in Sudan:

- Sudanese nomadic conflicts
- War in Darfur (2003–2020)
- Sudanese conflict in South Kordofan and Blue Nile (2011–2020)
- Blue Nile clashes (2022–2023)

== See also ==
- Mahdist War (1881–1899)
- Heglig Crisis (2012)
- South Sudanese wars of independence, the civil wars of 1955–1972 and 1983–2005 in South Sudan
- South Sudanese Civil War (2013–2018)
- Internal conflict in South Sudan (disambiguation)
- Sudanese Sovereignty Council (disambiguation)
- Sudanese coup d'état (disambiguation)
- Transitional Military Council (disambiguation)
