= 1990 Sudanese coup attempt =

- Part of the Second Sudanese Civil War
Date	23 April 1990
Location	Khartoum, Sudan 15°30′2″N 32°33′36″E
Result	Coup attempt failed.

Belligerents
Sudan	SAF coup plotters Alleged support: SPLA

Commanders and leaders
Omar al-Bashir (RCCNS-Sudan Chairman); Hassan al-Turabi (NIF Leader)	Abdul Gadir al-Kadaru (executed); Mohamed Osman Karrar (executed)
- Location within Sudan.

A failed coup d'état attempt took place in Sudan on 23 April 1990. Reportedly orchestrated by two retired Armed Forces officers, Major General Abdul Gadir al Kadaru and Brigadier Mohamed Osman Karrar, and planned by junior officers loyal to them, the coup attempt was directed against the RCCNS, the ruling military junta led by Lieutenant General Omar al-Bashir (who himself took power in the 1989 coup d'état).

According to Bashir, loyalist troops foiled the coup attempt by striking before the plotters could make their move, crushing the coup bid 'in its cradle'. He also claimed the plotters were 'in alliance with the rebels' of the SPLA, a predominantly Christian group that waged the then-ongoing civil war against the Muslim-led central government.

The Egyptian news agency MENA said there were unconfirmed reports of an exchange of gunfire at the Khartoum International Airport and the Armed Forces headquarters during the coup attempt.

Officials said about 30 officers and retired officers had been arrested.

== See also ==
- History of Sudan (1986–present)
