= 1959 Sudanese coup attempt =

Coup d'état attempt in Sudan

- Part of the First Sudanese Civil War and the Arab Cold War
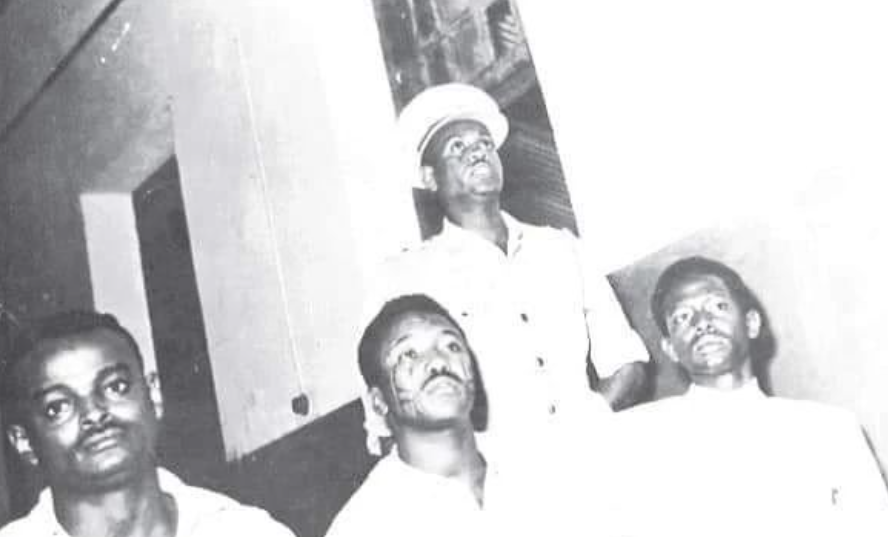
- Conspirators at the trial
Date	9 November 1959
Location	Khartoum, Sudan
Result	Coup attempt succeeds

Belligerents
Sudan: Armed Forces Supreme Council	Sudanese Armed Forces

Commanders and leaders
Ibrahim Abboud; President of Sudan	Ali Hamid (executed); Abd al-Badi Karrar (executed); Sadiq Muhammad Hassan (executed); Yaqoub Kabeida (executed); Abd al-Rahman Kabaida; Abd al-Hamid Abd al-Majid (executed)

A coup d'état was attempted in Sudan in 1959, aimed at overthrowing Lieutenant General Ibrahim Abboud, but was thwarted. The military court sentenced officers involved, with some receiving the death penalty, marking Sudan's first post-independence execution.

== The coup ==
On 9 November 1959, a group of military officers attempted a coup to overthrow Lieutenant General Ibrahim Abboud and his ruling military council. The officers involved in the coup were Binbashi Ali Hamid, Abd al-Badi Karrar, Yuzbashi Sadiq Muhammad Hassan, Binbashi Yaqoub Kabeida, Saag Abd al-Rahman Kabaida, Yuzbashi Abd al-Hamid Abd al-Majid, Yuzbashi Muhammad Mahjoub Othman (brother of Abdel Khaliq Mahjub), and Abdel-Moneim Mohamed Othman. The Yuzbashi Abdullah Al-Taher Bakr, Yuzbashi Bashir Muhammad Ali, and First Lieutenant Muhammad Jabara were also involved. Al-Rashid Al-Taher Bakr, a leader of the Muslim Brotherhood movement in Sudan, was part of the plan as well. The coup plan was leaked, and the military leadership was aware of the plot and closely monitored the officers involved. The coup attempt failed as the officers were arrested without any resistance. Subsequently, trials took place, attracting significant public attention. Some prominent lawyers, including Muhammad Ahmed Mahjoub, Ahmed Suleiman, Ahmed Zain Al-Abidin, Mansour Khaled, Anwar Adham, and Kamal Ramadan, defended the officers.

After 41 days of trials, the military court handed down verdicts. The court sentenced Binbashi Ali Hamid, Yuzbashi Abd al-Hamid Abd al-Majid, Binbashi Yaqoub Kabeida, Saag Abd al-Badi Ali Karrar, and Yuzbashi Sadiq Muhammad Hassan to death by hanging. Muhammad Mahjoub Othman, Saag Abd al-Rahman Kabeida, and Yuzbashi Abdullah al-Taher Bakr received life imprisonment and expulsion from the army. First Lieutenant Muhammad Jabara was sentenced to 14 years in prison, and Al-Rashid Al-Taher Bakr was sentenced to 5 years in prison.

Lieutenant General Abboud ratified the verdicts, leading to the execution of the officers on 20 December 1959 at Kobar Prison, with the bodies of the officers handed over to their families for burial. The coup attempt and subsequent executions were significant as they marked the first execution in the history of Sudan's armed forces after independence. Major General Mahmoud Qalandar, speculated that the method of execution, hanging instead of firing squad, was chosen to avoid potential complications in the ranks caused by soldiers' strong loyalty to their officers, which could lead to inaccurate shots.

Abd al-Rahman Kabeida, who was also involved in the 1957 Sudanese coup d'état attempt, remained imprisoned until his release after the October 1964 Revolution. He later became the General Director of the Sudanese Tourism Corporation.
