= 1957 Sudanese coup attempt =

Coup d'état attempt in Sudan

- Part of the Coups d'état in Sudan and First Sudanese Civil War
Date	June 1957
Location	Khartoum, Sudan
Result	Coup attempt fails

Belligerents
Sudan: NUP; PDP	Sudanese Armed Forces

Commanders and leaders
Sovereignty Council; President of Sudan; Abdallah Khalil; Prime Minister of Sudan	Abdel Rahman Ismail Kabeida; Coup leader Jaafar Nimeiry

In June 1957, after one year of Sudan independence in 1956, a group of army officers and students from the Sudanese Military College led by Abdel Rahman Ismail Kabeida, led a coup against the first national democratic government that was led by Prime Minister Abdullah Khalil and the Sovereignty Council. Kabeida's motive was to resolve the confusion in managing the political scene and to seize power. The attempt was thwarted, and he and his comrades were sentenced to prison. Kabeida was released after the 17 November 1958 coup d'état and tried to topple the government again in November 1959. He later became the General Director of the Sudanese Tourism Corporation.

Jaafar Nimeiry was accused of leading the armoured corps to support the coup. As a result of his alleged involvement, he was arrested during the autumn of 1957. Following his arrest, he was temporarily relieved of his duties until April 1959 when he was assigned to the Southern Command in Juba.
