= 2004 Sudanese coup attempts =

2004 coup attempt in Sudan

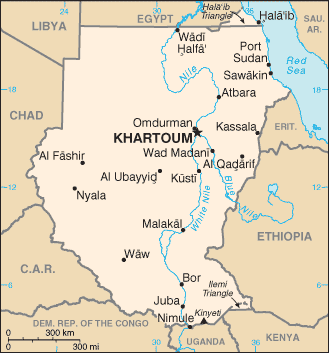
Map of Sudan, before the 2011 secession of South Sudan.

The 2004 Sudanese coup attempts were two a coup d'état attempts in Sudan in March and September 2004 against the president Omar al-Bashir and his cabinet. The coups were instigated by Popular Congress party (PCP) an Islamist political party led by Hassan al-Turabi.

== March coup attempt ==
In late March al-Turabi, six members of his party and 27 of senior army officers were arrested and accused of planning a coup. Sudanese military officers alleged that the officers were from Darfur and sympathetic to the PCP. The coup attempt was allegedly supported and funded by the Chadian president Idriss Déby. The coup attempt is thought to be instigated by the Zaghawa members of the government, same ethnic group which forms the Justice and Equality Movement (JEM). Four PCP members were released in April 2004 including al-Turabi.

== September coup attempt ==
A second attempted coup was staged in September 2004. On 8 September 2004, 70 PCP members were arrested for connections to the coup plot. Three weapon caches were also discovered allegedly containing rifles and mortars. PCP spokesman Muhammad al-Hassan al-Amin stated that the members were not planning a coup and the weapon caches were to prepare for a "government crackdown". The head of the National Intelligence and Security Service (NISS) Mohammed Atta stated that the weapons had been acquired from Eritrea. The governor of West Darfur, Suleiman Abdullah Adam accused JEM of taking a part in the coup attempt. Al-Bashir denounced PCP stating thet they were "Zionists and Freemasons". Al-Turabi was freed on 8 September 2013, after being detained for nine years accused of the September coup attempt.

== See also ==
- 2012 Sudanese coup d'état attempt
