= Climate change in South Sudan =

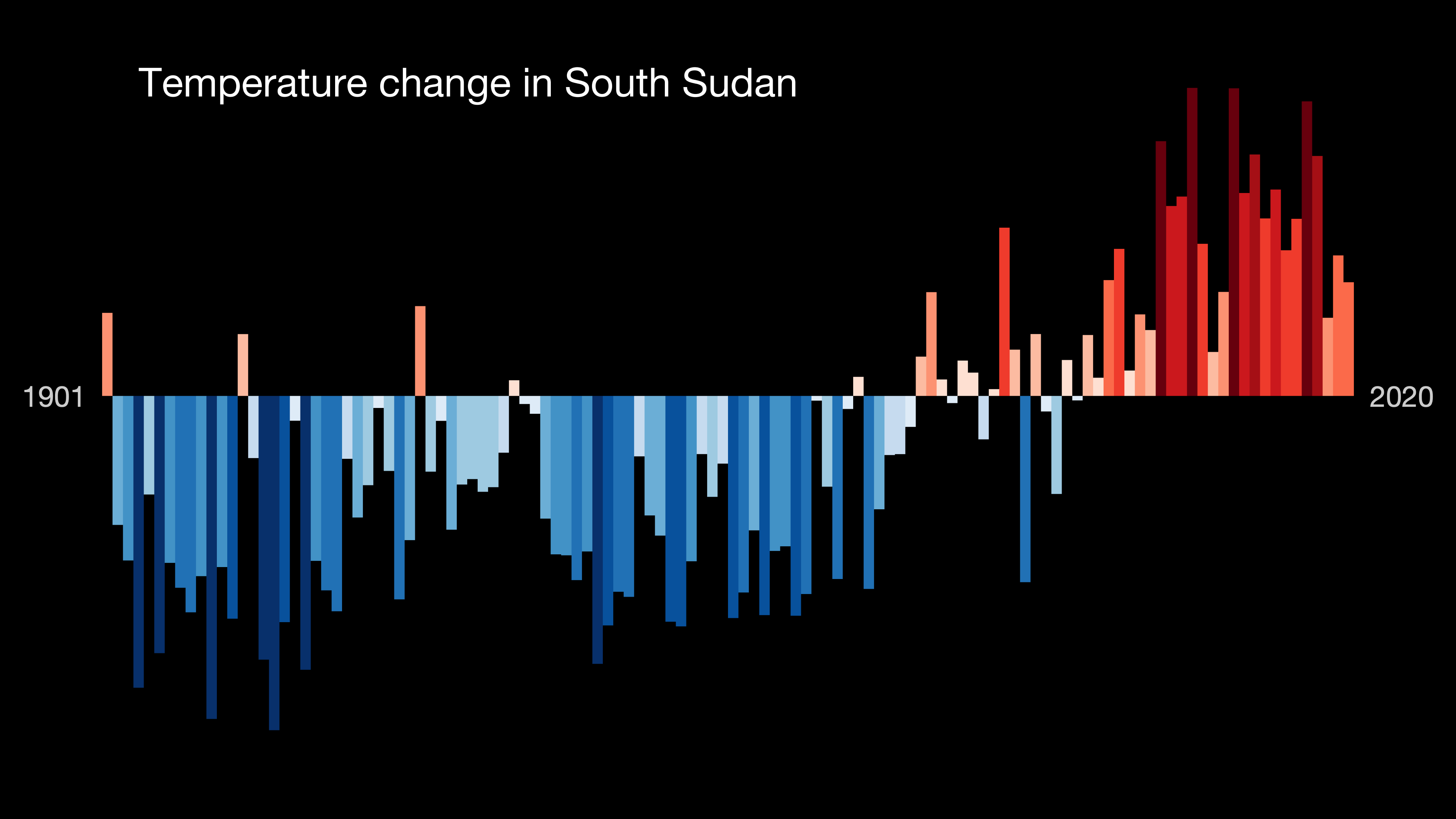
This bar chart is a visual representation of the change in temperature in the past 100+ years. Each stripe represents the temperature averaged over a year. The average temperature in 1971–2000 is set as the boundary between blue and red colors, and the color scale varies from ±2.6 standard deviations of the annual average temperatures between the years mentioned in the file name.

South Sudan is one of the five most vulnerable countries to climate change in the world. The country is facing the impacts of climate change, including droughts and flooding, which have indirect and interlinked implications for peace and security. Mean annual temperatures across South Sudan have increased by more than 0.4°C every decade in the past 30 years and are projected to increase between 1°C and 1.5°C by 2060, creating a warmer and drier climate. In the northeast, rainfall has decreased by 15–20%, while other regions experience more frequent and severe floods.

== Greenhouse gas emissions ==
South Sudan's greenhouse gas (GHG) emissions in 2020 saw a significant 13.97% increase compared to 2019, reaching a total of 56,051.36. The previous year, in 2019, South Sudan's GHG emissions experienced a notable decline of 12.8% with a recorded value of 49,180.53. Furthermore, in 2018, South Sudan observed a 9.86% increase in GHG emissions, totaling 56,397.92.

Fossil Carbon Dioxide (CO2) emissions of South Sudan
Year	Fossil CO2 Emissions (tons)	CO2 emissions change	CO2 emissions per capita	Population	Pop. change	Share of World's CO2 emissions
2016	4,038,496	4.18%	0.36	11,066,105	-1.15 %	0.01%
2015	3,876,470	1.64%	0.35	11,194,299	-0.17 %	0.01%
2014	3,813,985	-0.80%	0.34	11,213,284	0.97 %	0.01%
2013	3,844,685	0.57%	0.35	11,106,031	3.78 %	0.01%
2012	3,822,860	-1.34%	0.36	10,701,604	4.48 %	0.01%
2011	3,874,719	3.64%	0.38	10,243,050	5.44 %	0.01%
2010	3,738,752	4.97%	0.38	9,714,419	5.26 %	0.01%
2009	3,561,629	3.78%	0.39	9,229,227	4.59 %	0.01%
2008	3,431,982	5.79%	0.39	8,823,888	4.82 %	0.01%
2007	3,244,099	9.22%	0.39	8,417,823	4.84 %	0.01%
2006	2,970,325	23.66%	0.37	8,029,517	4.79 %	0.01%
2005	2,401,945	12.70%	0.31	7,662,654	4.72 %	0.01%
2004	2,131,293	13.06%	0.29	7,317,118	4.64 %	0.01%
2003	1,885,091	0.48%	0.27	6,992,367	4.58 %	0.01%
2002	1,876,124	23.57%	0.28	6,686,100	4.56 %	0.01%
2001	1,518,322	9.17%	0.24	6,394,431	4.58 %	0.00%
2000	1,390,806	12.42%	0.23	6,114,440	4.52 %	0.00%
1999	1,237,140	9.93%	0.21	5,850,145	2.64 %	0.00%
1998	1,125,420	-9.75%	0.20	5,699,436	1.97 %	0.00%
1997	1,246,940	21.48%	0.22	5,589,410	2.84 %	0.00%
1996	1,026,415	-2.38%	0.19	5,434,894	2.51 %	0.00%
1995	1,051,435	-6.45%	0.20	5,302,042	3.10 %	0.00%
1994	1,123,892	47.99%	0.22	5,142,863	2.48 %	0.00%
1993	759,436	-29.08%	0.15	5,018,172	1.23 %	0.00%
1992	1,070,796	-5.53%	0.22	4,956,969	1.84 %	0.00%
1991	1,133,422	-10.67%	0.23	4,867,185	2.45 %	0.00%
1990	1,268,762	33.46%	0.27	4,750,817	0.94 %	0.00%
1989	950,689	-9.61%	0.20	4,706,626	-2.25 %	0.00%
1988	1,051,718	44.01%	0.22	4,814,879	-1.61 %	0.00%
1987	730,295	-22.88%	0.15	4,893,809	1.54 %	0.00%
1986	946,903	-1.90%	0.20	4,819,667	2.39 %	0.00%
1985	965,262	18.15%	0.21	4,706,975	2.26 %	0.00%
1984	816,975	-10.36%	0.18	4,603,039	2.23 %	0.00%
1983	911,408	1.86%	0.20	4,502,541	2.37 %	0.00%
1982	894,726	3.29%	0.20	4,398,297	2.43 %	0.00%
1981	866,207	-2.84%	0.20	4,293,866	2.43 %	0.00%
1980	891,541	17.11%	0.21	4,192,012	2.42 %	0.00%
1979	761,295	2.42%	0.19	4,092,792	2.42 %	0.00%
1978	743,309	-8.89%	0.19	3,995,911	2.43 %	0.00%
1977	815,795	5.48%	0.21	3,901,044	2.43 %	0.00%
1976	773,425	-3.13%	0.20	3,808,615	2.43 %	0.00%
1975	798,421	-22.82%	0.21	3,718,279	2.44 %	0.00%
1974	1,034,427	-5.93%	0.28	3,629,608	2.46 %	0.00%
1973	1,099,586	30.63%	0.31	3,542,465	2.24 %	0.00%
1972	841,771	7.39%	0.24	3,464,715	2.00 %	0.00%
1971	783,844	0.36%	0.23	3,396,808	1.63 %	0.00%

== Agriculture and livestock ==
Climate change is having a significant impact on agriculture and livestock in South Sudan. Droughts have killed livestock and disrupted crop cycles, leading to food insecurity. To address this issue, the United Nations High Commissioner for Refugees (UNHCR) is distributing early maturing and drought-resistant seed varieties, as well as supporting the introduction of irrigation systems. The losses of livestock attributed to climate change, coupled with existing rivalries, heighten the probability of cattle theft, which can result in retaliatory actions, communal conflicts, population displacement, exacerbation of inter-communal animosity, and the emergence of armed factions.
