= 2012 Sudanese coup attempt =

2012 coup attempt in Sudan

- Part of the 2011–2013 Sudanese protests, Darfur war
| Date | 22 November 2012 |
| Location | Khartoum, Sudan 15°36′N 32°30′E |
| Result | Coup attempt fails |

Belligerents
| Sudan | (Sudan) SAF coup plotters Supported by: Justice and Equality Movement (JEM) |

Commanders and leaders
| Omar al-Bashir; President of Sudan | Salah Gosh; 15 other Army and Security officers |
- Location within Sudan

A coup d'état attempt took place on 22 November 2012 in Sudan against president Omar al-Bashir, who had taken power in the 1989 Sudanese coup d'état.

The coup started as an attempt to overthrow the government over disputes between the military and Salah Gosh about the conflict in South Kordofan and Blue Nile, Heglic crisis and Israeli airstrikes in Sudan. Other factors that contributed to the coup attempt were upheavals (mainly the 2011–2013 Sudanese protests) and worsening economic situation. The plotting of the coup was discovered by he National Intelligence and Security Service (NISS) and a former intelligence chief Qutbi Al-Mahdi, stated that the coup attempt was only in the planning stage. According to the Sudanese information minister Ahmed Bilal Osman, 13 were arrested during the coup attempt, including former Director of the NISS, Salah Gosh. Osman also accused the Justice and Equality Movement (JEM) of coordinating with the coup plotters. Gosh was later released because of a lack of evidence against him. Al-Bashir also pardoned nine army officers and six security officers implicated in the coup plot.

== See also ==
- 2004 Sudanese coup d'état attempt
