= 1975 Sudanese coup attempt =

On 5 September 1975, rebel army officers, members of the Sudanese Communist Party, attempted to overthrow the government of President Gaafar an-Nimeiry in Sudan. The coup attempt involved the seizing of the state radio station in Omdurman, across the Nile from Khartoum, and fighting around the army headquarters and the presidential palace in Khartoum. However, the coup was crushed within hours by loyalist troops.

Vice President Mohamed al-Baghir Ahmed announced that the leader of the coup attempt was identified as Brigadier Hassan Hussein Osman, who was initially reported to have been "silenced forever" but later corrected to being wounded and receiving treatment at a military hospital in Omdurman. Osman was later court martialled and executed.

The coup attempt was the second such attempt against President Gaafar an-Nimeiry since he took power in 1969, with a previous coup attempt being staged in July 1971 by leftist officers and also suppressed.

In the aftermath, artist Ibrahim el-Salahi was accused of participating in the coup and imprisoned for over six months without trial.
