= Racism in Sudan =

Racism in Sudan is complex due to the racial mixture of various populations. A historical process created social and cultural hierarchies that privileged Arab-Islamic identity and discriminated against African racial and cultural identities.

== History ==
=== Slavery and the development of Arab identity ===
Sudan's history of slavery predates the modern state. The earliest recorded evidence of slavery dates to the reign of the First Dynasty pharaoh Djer, around 2900 BCE, when the acquisition of Nubian slaves from Sudan was recorded near the Second Cataract of the Nile. Over the following millennia, enslaved people from Nubia were transported north to Egypt, many of them captured during Egyptian military campaigns. They were used as soldiers, domestic servants and concubines, while slave labour also played a role in Nubian mining.

These longstanding connections with Egypt were later accompanied by closer contacts with the Arab world. Sudan, which borders Egypt and lies close to the Arabian Peninsula, has had longstanding contacts with the Arab world, including trade in commodities such as gold and ivory dating to the pre-Islamic period. Arab traders later settled among indigenous Sudanese communities and intermarried with local families. Their relative wealth, social status and religious culture made them attractive marriage partners for prominent Sudanese families.

The spread of Islam from the seventh century intensified the process of Arabization. Intermarriage largely took place between Arab Muslim men and Sudanese women, and the patriarchal social system increased the number of families tracing descent through Arab Muslim men. Arab settlement was less common in southern Sudan because of geographical barriers, harsh living conditions, the tropical climate and opposition to Arab influence among indigenous Nilotic peoples.

The spread of Arabic and the adoption of Arab identity intensified after the decline of the Christian Nubian kingdoms in the early 14th century and became more firmly established under the Funj Sultanate from the 16th century. Arab identity also became associated with social status. In northern Sudan, being Arab was linked to being Muslim, free and of high standing, while the term Sudanese was associated with blackness and, through the legacy of slavery, with servile status. Northern Sudanese society had strong social hierarchies.

By the 16th century, many northern Sudanese Muslims identified themselves as Arabs. Over time, non-Muslim peoples in the south were increasingly described in racial and ethnic terms that marked them as inferior. By the late 18th century, southerners were being referred to with the term ʿabd ("slave"), while communities in the south, the Upper Blue Nile and the Nuba Mountains were treated as populations that could be enslaved.

=== Slavery and racial divisions in the 19th century ===
In the 1820s, Turkish-Egyptian forces invaded northern Sudan, which was subsequently used as a base for slave-raiding expeditions into the south. Khartoum, founded in 1821, became a major slave market, and by the latter half of the 19th century, enslaved people made up about two-thirds of Khartoum’s population. Sudan became a major centre of slave raiding in Africa, with enslaved people taken from southern regions and transported northwards to Sudan, Egypt, the Middle East and the Mediterranean.

Opposition arose in both northern and southern Sudan and later developed into the revolt led by Muhammad Ahmad al-Mahdi, who established his rule in 1885. Muhammad Ahmad used Islam to build support for his movement and promote unification of the country. Although many southerners did not accept Islam, they initially supported his rule because they saw it as a means of ending Turkish-Egyptian authority. The continuation of slavery in the south, however, deepened distrust of Islam and widened divisions between northern and southern Sudan.

=== Colonial rule ===
From 1899 to 1956, Sudan was governed under the Anglo-Egyptian Condominium, with Britain exercising the dominant role. British authorities formally opposed slavery, but slave raiding in southern Sudan continued. Slavery was officially abolished in 1924. Many northern Sudanese resisted the abolition of slavery, showing racist attitudes toward darker-skinned southern Sudanese to justify the continuation of slavery. Among the opponents of abolition were prominent Arab and Islamic leaders, including Abdul Rahman al-Mahdi and Ali al-Mirghani. Colonial officials made allowances for northern demands that some forms of slavery continue.

British colonial rule also preserved and strengthened existing social hierarchies. High-status Arab men were favoured for academic education and administrative careers, while people of slave descent, whom British officials described as "Sudanese" or "detribalized blacks", were directed more often toward military and manual work. British colonial policy concentrated political, economic, educational and cultural development in northern Sudan, while the south was comparatively isolated and neglected. The south was associated with derogatory views of its African inhabitants, reinforcing regional divisions.

During the 1920s and 1930s, northern Sudanese nationalists began adopting the term Sudanese as an expression of national identity, despite its historical associations with blackness and slavery. The term gradually gained acceptance, although some high-status northern Arabs continued to reject it. After independence in 1956, some northern Arabs refused to apply for passports because doing so would require them to identify as Sudanese.

In 1941, nationalist politician Muhammad Ahmad Mahgoub, who later became prime minister, described Sudanese identity as the product of intermarriage and cultural exchange among Arab, African and other populations. He attributed the population's cultural superiority to its Arab heritage and argued that embracing Arab-Islamic culture was necessary for national progress.

=== Independence ===
Sudan became independent in 1956. Successive northern governments pursued Arabization and Islamization as means of integrating the country, while political, economic and administrative development remained concentrated in north-central Sudan. Senior government positions were largely held by members of the northern Arab and Nubian communities, which also dominated the military leadership, whose influence extended into the business sector. In the south, these policies were widely seen as domination by the Arab and Muslim north rather than national integration, reinforcing racial, cultural and religious divisions and contributing to conflict between the two regions.

Education was another area in which the government's Arabization policies were implemented. In the 1950s, northern Sudanese nationalists introduced measures to expand Arabic-language education in southern Sudan, replacing colonial policies that had provided for instruction in indigenous languages and English. In 1957, the Northern government revealed plans to nationalise Christian missionary schools. That same year, the person who wrote a Southern Federal Party manifesto advocating official status for English and Christianity alongside Arabic and Islam, as well as a stronger African identity for Sudan, received a seven-year prison sentence for sedition.

According to several scholars, (Note: Sharkey identifies Amir H. Idris, R. S. O'Fahey, Alex de Waal, Gérard Prunier, Sharif Harir, "and others" as scholars who have advanced this argument.) Arabism in Sudan increasingly developed into a racial ideology during the 1980s.

Slavery became more widespread again during the Second Sudanese Civil War in the 1980s, particularly through raids on black southern Sudanese communities.

=== Racial discrimination and ethnic cleansing in Darfur ===
Already in 1991, elders of the Zaghawa people complained to Sudan's president about what they described as an emerging system of apartheid. In 1994, an administrative restructuring under President Omar al-Bashir placed members of Arab ethnic groups in new positions of power in Darfur. The Fur, Masalit and Zaghawa saw this as a deliberate effort to weaken their established leadership structures and reduce their communities' influence.

The Darfur conflict, which began in 2003, had a strong ethnic and racial dimension. Government forces and allied Arab Janjaweed militias targeted the Fur, Masalit and Zaghawa. These are Darfur's three largest ethnic groups classified as non-Arab or African. Religious differences were not a driving factor in the conflict, as both the targeted communities and the Janjaweed were Muslim. During attacks on villages in 2003 and 2004, Janjaweed fighters were reported to have shouted "Kill the Nuba!", using "Nuba" as a derogatory term for ethnic Africans. In 2004, Human Rights Watch concluded that the attacks and forced displacement in West Darfur amounted to a government policy of "ethnic cleansing" directed against the Fur and Masalit populations. Similar conclusions had been expressed by the UN Emergency Relief Coordinator and Mukesh Kapila, the former UN Resident Coordinator in Sudan.

Alan Dershowitz has pointed to the extremely prevalent elite-sponsored colorism in Sudan as an example of a government that deserves the appellation "apartheid". Former Canadian Minister of Justice Irwin Cotler has also criticized Sudan in similar terms.

== Contemporary racism ==
Sudan is highly ethnically diverse, with more than 500-600 ethnic groups living in the country. About 70% of Sudan’s population is classified as Sudanese Arab, while the remaining 30% includes African ethnic groups such as the Fur, Beja, Nuba, Zaghawa, Masalit and Fallata.

In Sudan, racial identity has not been determined by skin colour alone, but also by identification as Arab or African and by geographical origin, particularly the distinction between northern and southern Sudan. In a 2011 report published before South Sudan's independence, Sudanese journalist Godfried Victor Bulla explained that even dark-skinned northerners, including then-president Omar al-Bashir, were regarded as Arabs rather than black. Khartoum-based analyst Albaqir Mukhtar similarly noted that people with comparable skin tones could be classified differently depending on whether they came from northern or southern Sudan. Bulla also stated that black southern Sudanese faced racial discrimination from northern Sudanese Arabs even when they shared the same religion.

According to a 2020 BBC report, some Sudanese who identify as Arab routinely use the term "slave" and other racial slurs to refer to black Sudanese people, while newspapers commonly publish similarly derogatory language. The report also stated that media outlets in Khartoum frequently used the term "negros" to describe petty criminals, reflecting assumptions that they were poor and not ethnically Arab. The BBC documented several incidents of racial discrimination, including public abuse directed at an interracial couple, a racist remark by a women's rights activist and a black government minister who resigned, alleging that he had experienced institutional racism and marginalisation.

Since the outbreak of the Sudanese civil war in 2023, reports have described the use of an informal practice known as the "Foreign Faces Law" in areas controlled by the Sudanese army. Despite its name, it has no formal legal basis. People from Darfur and the Nuba Mountains have reportedly been stopped, searched and detained because of their appearance, accents or ethnic background, sometimes on suspicion of links to the Rapid Support Forces (RSF).

Human Rights Watch reported in April 2026 that security and military forces affiliated with the Sudanese Armed Forces had detained civilians on suspicion of supporting the RSF, sometimes solely because of their ethnic background. People from Darfur were particularly affected, as security forces associated them with the RSF because of the group's origins in Darfur. Some detainees were beaten, tortured or held without access to legal counsel.

== See also ==
- Arab slave trade
- The Black Book: Imbalance of Power and Wealth in the Sudan
