= Periodontal examination =

Dental examination

A periodontal examination is a clinical examination of the periodontium (gums). It is routinely carried out in dentistry and allied specialties. Many different techniques are used around the world.

A report by World Health Organization in 1978 led to the creation of the Community Periodontal Index of Treatment Needs (CPITN) and a periodontal probe termed WHO 621 ("Trintity"). It has a ball end of diameter 0.5 mm and a first colored band at 3.5 - 5.5 mm. Another colored band at 8.5 - 11.5 mm may be present. The CPITN was intended to provide a global standard for clinical practise and research, but several different periodontal screening tools were adapted from it. The Periodontal Screening and Recording (PSR) is increasingly used in the United States, Canada and Brazil. The Basic Periodontal Examination (BPE) is extensively used in the United Kingdom and New Zealand. The Primary Essential Periodontal Examination (PEPE) is used in Australia. All these methods use the WHO 621 probe.

== Basic Periodontal Examination ==
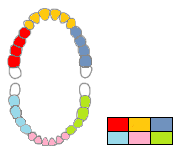
Division of mouth into sextants for Basic Periodontal Examination

This is the technique recommended by the British Society of Periodontology since its introduction in 1986. It is a screening tool which is used to quickly obtain a rough picture of the periodontal condition and treatment needs of an individual, but it does not provide an exact periodontal diagnosis.

For the purposes of a BPE, all the teeth in a person's mouth are divided into sextants (i.e. 6 parts), namely the upper right second molar to the upper right first premolar, the upper right canine to the upper left canine, the upper left first premolar to the upper left second molar, the lower right second molar to the lower right first premolar, lower right canine to the lower left canine, and the lower left first premolar to the lower left second molar. Wisdom teeth are not included because pericoronitis and tooth impaction may cause isolated periodontal defects which do not represent the general periodontal condition of the rest of the mouth. At least 2 teeth must be present in a sextant for it to be scored. If only 1 tooth is present in a sextant, the tooth is included in the adjoining sextant.

The probe is "walked around" measuring the depth of the gingival crevices/periodontal pockets (the gap between the tooth and the gums, "below the gumline") with a force of approximately 20 - 25 gm (20 - 25 N) (about the force using when writing with a pencil). The worst finding in a sextant dictates the sextant's BPE score. The BPE is usually recorded in a table of six boxes (see diagram). The scoring is as follows:

Code	Description	Treatment
0	No disease (gingival pockets < 3 mm)	No action required
1	Bleeding on probing, but gingival pockets < 3 mm	Oral hygiene instruction because bleeding on probing usually indicates the presence of plaque induced gingivitis
2	Periodontal pocketing < 3mm, but calculus (dental) present with or without plaque retentive factors such as "overhanging" restorations	Oral hygiene instruction, remove plaque retentive factors (e.g. replace ledged restoration with correct use of matrix band, remove calculus with professional tooth cleaning)
3	Shallow periodontal pockets 4 – 5 mm (i.e. first band on probe partially visible)	More detailed examination of periodontal condition indicated
4	Deep periodontal pockets > 6 mm (first band on probe disappears)	More detailed examination of periodontal condition indicated
* (star added to the score, e.g. 4*)	Periodontal defect furcation	More detailed examination of periodontal condition indicated

== CPITN Index ==
Code	Description
0	No disease (gingival pockets < 3 mm)
1	Bleeding on probing, but gingival pockets < 3 mm
2	Periodontal pocketing < 3mm, but calculus (dental) present with or without plaque retentive factors such as "overhanging" restorations
3	Shallow periodontal pockets 4 - 5.5 mm (i.e. first band on probe partially visible)
4	Deep periodontal pockets > 6 mm (first band on probe disappears)

== PSR Index ==
The PSR (Periodontal Screening and Recording) system was first introduced to the United States in 1992. It is based on the CPITN index.

Code	Description
0	No disease (gingival pockets < 3 mm)
1	Bleeding on probing, but gingival pockets < 3 mm
2	Periodontal pocketing < 3mm, but calculus (dental) present with or without plaque retentive factors such as "overhanging" restorations
3	Shallow periodontal pockets (i.e. first band on probe partially visible)
4	Deep periodontal pockets > 5.5 mm (first band on probe disappears)
* (star added to the score, e.g. 4*)	Indicates an additional issue that must be considered e.g. furcation, substantial gingival recession, mobility

== Spanish Periodontal Examination ==
In teeth 16, 11, 25, 32, 36 and 45, the following is assessed:

• Probing depth (PS - profundidad de sondaje)

• Bleeding on probing (BOP: +/-)

• Loss of attachment with bitewings (Horizontal bone loss/ Vertical defects)

(If said teeth are absent, the immediately adjacent teeth are taken as a reference or failing that, whichever is closest clinically affected.)
