= March 1978 =

Month of 1978

<<	March 1978					>>
Su	Mo	Tu	We	Th	Fr	Sa
			1	2	3	4
5	6	7	8	9	10	11
12	13	14	15	16	17	18
19	20	21	22	23	24	25
26	27	28	29	30	31

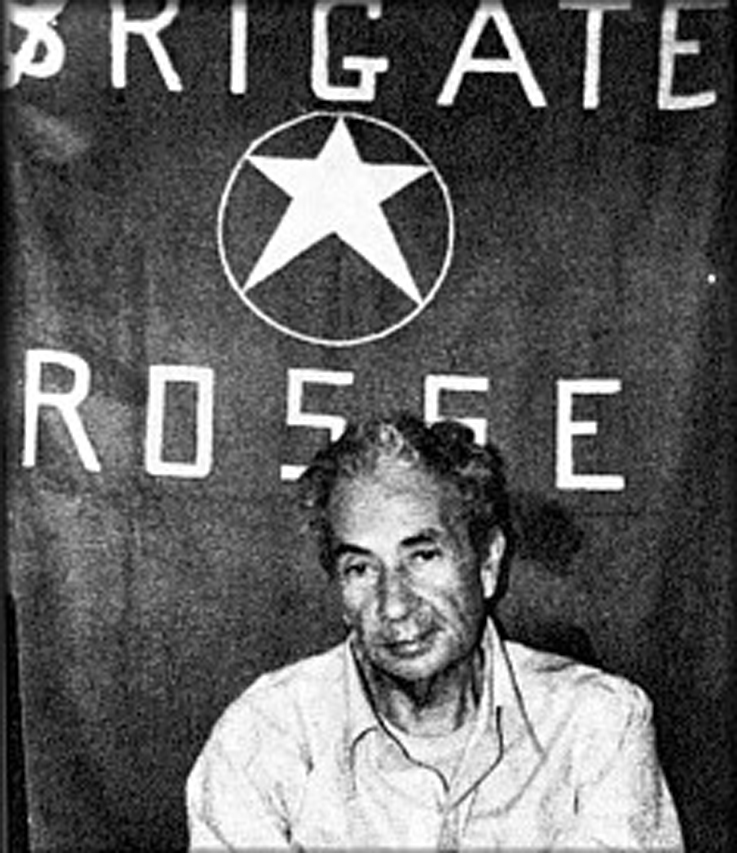
March 16, 1978: Former Italian Prime Minister Aldo Moro kidnapped by Italy's Red Brigades terrorist organization

The following events occurred in March 1978:

== March 1, 1978 (Wednesday) ==
- Charlie Chaplin's remains were stolen from Corsier-sur-Vevey in the canton of Vaud in Switzerland.
- All 18 people aboard a Nigeria Airways airliner were killed when the Fokker F28 Fellowship jet from Sokoto was landing at Kano at the same time that a Nigerian Air Force MiG-21 training aircraft was taking off. The two collided, killing the occupants of both airplanes.
- Continental Airlines Flight 603, an American DC-10 airliner, crashed while attempting to take off from Los Angeles International Airport, killing two people and injuring 84 others, including 11 firefighters. All but two of the 183 people on board were able to escape the aircraft. The airplane was accelerating on the runway when it blew two tires and then tilted on to one wing, whose fuel tanks were ruptured. The two who died disregarded warnings and went out of the left side emergency exit and into a fire.
- Born:
  - Liya Kebede, Ethiopian-born supermodel and clothing designer, as well as the World Health Organization's Ambassador for Maternal, Newborn and Child Health; in Addis Ababa
  - Jensen Ackles, American TV actor known for Supernatural; in Dallas
- Died: Paul Scott, British novelist known for his tetralogy The Raj Quartet; in London

== March 2, 1978 (Thursday) ==
- Soyuz 28 was launched from the Soviet Union to link up with the orbiting space station to dock with rendezvous with Salyut 6. The flight was the first to carry a space traveler from a nation other than the U.S. or the Soviet Union. As the first cosmonaut trained through the Interkosmos program, Czechoslovak Vladimír Remek was launched along with Aleksei Gubarev.
- By a vote of 3 to 2, the U.S. Court of Customs and Patent Appeals ruled that a life form could be created (in the court's words) "by what is sometimes referred to as 'genetic engineering'." The life form in question was a bacterium created by the General Electric company to consume petroleum, and to be used in cleaning up oil spills.
- After not having recorded a deadly tiger attack since 1962, the nation of India had the first in a series of 90 deaths over a four-year period. At the Dudhwa National Park in the state of Uttar Pradesh, an employee of the Forest Corporation of Satiana, identified in the press as Akbar, was killed while he was taking a bathroom break. Soon, two other tigers were responsible for attacks at the towns of Goia and Sarada.
- Born:
- Jim Chalmers, Australian politician, Treasurer of Australia (2022–present), Brisbane
  - Tomáš Kaberle, Czech ice hockey player in the National Hockey League and the Czech Extraliga, as well as for the national team; in Rakovník, Czechoslovakia
  - Sebastian Janikowski, Polish-born American NFL football kicker; in Wałbrzych
- Died:
  - Mario Pei, 77, Italian-born American linguist and author of multiple bestselling books about etymology and linguistics, including The Story of English (1952), The Story of Language (Lipincott, 1949) and How To Learn Languages And What Languages To Learn (Harper & Row, 1973)
  - Ruth Dwyer, 81, American silent film actress

== March 3, 1978 (Friday) ==
- Ethiopia admitted that its troops were being assisted by soldiers from Cuba in the war against Somalia's army in the Ogaden.
- Rhodesia attacked Zambia.

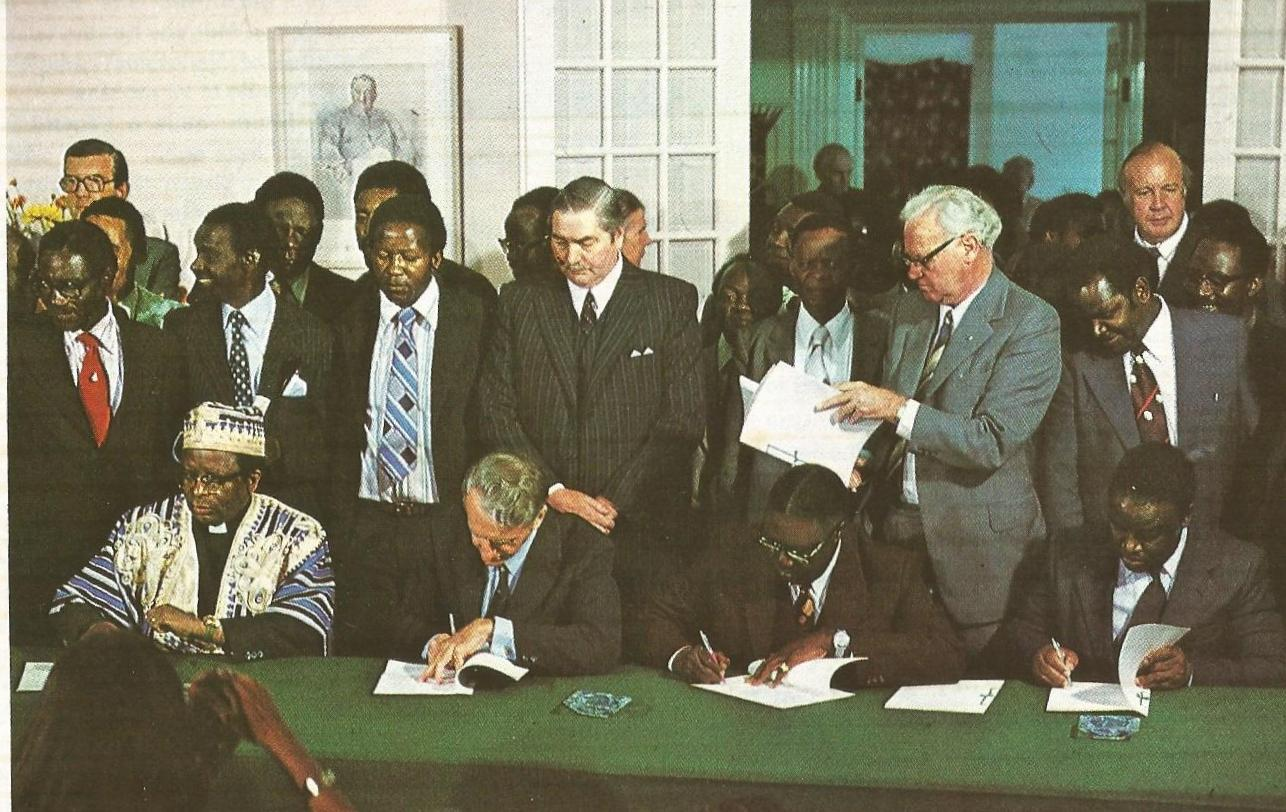
Rhodesia Executive Council members Muzorewa, Smith, Chirau and Sithole signing Rhodesian Internal Settlement

- Rhodesia's white prime minister, Ian Smith, signed an agreement with three moderate black leaders (Abel Muzorewa, Ndabaningi Sithole and Jeremiah Chirau) for a transitional government that would lead the southern African nation to majority black rule as Zimbabwe by the end of the year.
- In Venezuela, all 47 people aboard an LAV (Linea Aeropostal Venezolana) airliner were killed when the HS 748 turboprop plunged into the Caribbean Sea shortly after takeoff from Caracas on a flight to Cumaná.
- The New York Post published an article about David Rorvik's book In His Image: The Cloning of Man, about a supposed cloning of a human being. Rorvik claimed that in 1975, scientists had created a human baby from a single cell and that the child, born in December 1976, "was paid for by a millionaire who wanted an exact duplicate of himself." The book came to light when it was advertised in Publishers Weekly by the J. B. Lippincott company. At the time of the announcement, cloning of animals had been limited to frogs and sea urchins, but an attempt to clone a mammal (in that instance, a rabbit) had been unsuccessful. Dr. Bernard Talbot of the National Institutes of Health told reporters, "All scientific data we have would make it seem very, very unlikely. It is very, very probable that it is a hoax."
- Surgeons in Columbus, Ohio successfully separated a pair of conjoined twins who had been joined at the abdomen. The two boys shared a liver, a thoracic diaphragm and a pericardium, but each had his own heart, lungs, kidneys and circulatory system.
- Born:
  - Tanishaa Mukerji, Indian film actress known for Code Name Abdul; in Bombay (Mumbai)
  - Aarti Mann (stage name for Aarti Majumdar), American TV actress known for playing the recurring role of "Priya Koothrappali" in The Big Bang Theory

== March 4, 1978 (Saturday) ==
- Soviet cosmonauts Yuri Romanenko and Georgy Grechko broke the old record for longest time in outer space as they marked their 85th day in orbit on the Salyut 6 space station. The previous record, set in 1974 by the crew of Skylab 3 had been 84 days, one hour and 16 minutes, set by U.S. astronauts Gerald P. Carr, Edward G. Gibson and William R. Pogue. Romanenko had been in space since December 10 when Soyuz 28 was launched.
- The Chicago Daily News, an afternoon newspaper that had published in Chicago since 1876, printed its last issue.
- Born: Denis Dallan, Italian rugby union footballer with 42 caps for the Italy national team; in Asolo, province of Treviso
- Died:
  - Wesley Bolin, 68, who had been sworn in as Governor of Arizona on October 20, died of a heart attack.
  - Robert W. Prescott, 64, American businessman who had been a flying ace during World War II and then founded the Flying Tiger Line air cargo carrier.

== March 5, 1978 (Sunday) ==
- Delegates to the 5th National People's Congress of the People's Republic of China adopted the nation's third Constitution, replacing the 1975 Constitution. The People's Congress also re-elected Hua Guofeng as Premier and leader of the Communist Party.
- Voting was held in Guatemala for the President and for the 61-member Congreso de la República. Three candidates ran for president, none of whom received a majority of the popular vote. General Fernando Lucas Garcia had a plurality of 40%, followed by 34% for a former president, Colonel Enrique Peralta Azurdia, who led a coup d'état in 1963 and served until the 1966 election. The two parties supporting General Lucas Garcia— the Partido Institucional Democrático and the Partido Revolucionario— won 31 of the 61 seats of the Congreso. The Congreso elected Lucas Garcia as president, giving him 35 of the 60 votes, while the other 25 legislators cast blank votes.
- The Battle of Jijiga ended with a victory by Ethiopia, which had recently obtained aid from the Soviet Union, over Somalia in the Ogaden War after almost six months of fighting. The loss at Jijiga effectively ended the war between the two north African nations.

== March 6, 1978 (Monday) ==
- U.S. President Jimmy Carter invoked the Taft–Hartley Act to force an end to the United Mine Workers Association (UMWA) strike that had been going on for three months during winter. In invoking the act (which provided for federal courts forcing workers to return to the job pending negotiations) for the first time since 1971, Carter said "My responsibility is to protect the health and safety of the American public and I intend to do so," adding that "the country cannot afford to wait any longer."
- Troops from the white minority-ruled nation of Rhodesia crossed the Zambesi River to invade Zambia. The Rhodesians killed 38 Zimbabwean nationalist guerrillas and lost one member.
- Larry Flynt, the publisher of the pornographic magazine Hustler, was shot by a sniper and left paralyzed from the waist down while outside the courthouse in Lawrenceville, Georgia. The attempted killing was later traced to white supremacist and domestic terrorist Joseph Paul Franklin, who was responsible for at least 21 murders, and would say later that he was angered by photographs in Hustler depicting sexual intercourse between a black man and a white woman.
- The crash of a helicopter in Libya killed all 11 people aboard, including members of a delegation from East Germany who were negotiating a trade agreement with the North African nation. The dead included Werner Lamberz and Paul Markowski, members of East Germany's parliament, the Volkskammer and the Communist Party's Central Committee, with official photographer Hans-Joachim Spremberg and the Libyan Minister of Transport, Taha El Sherif Ben Amer. Lamberz, referred to by one newspaper as "Honecker's Crown Prince" (Honeckers Kronprinzen), was a trusted aide of East Germany's leader Erich Honecker and a possible successor to the Communist Party leader.
- The U.S. state of Wyoming became the first state in more than 104 years, and the ninth overall, to ratify the proposed Twenty-seventh Amendment to the United States Constitution. The text declared that "No law, varying the compensation for the services of the Senators and Representatives, shall take effect, until an election of Representatives shall have intervened," and was passed in Wyoming initially as a protest against the members of the U.S. Congress voting to increase the amount of their own salaries. The proposed amendment had been introduced in 1789 and ratified by seven of the then 15 U.S. states by 1792, short of the necessary 12 required for a three-fourths majority. After almost 80 years, Ohio became the eighth state to ratify. Following Wyoming's ratification, the number of states following the Wyoming example began increasing in 1983, and the amendment became part of the U.S. Constitution on May 7, 1992, more than 200 years after it was introduced.
- Born: Nate Walcott, American film score composer; in Albany, New York
- Died: Micheál Mac Liammóir (born Alfred Lee Willmore), 78, English-born Irish stage actor and playwright, known for writing and acting in the one-man show The Importance of Being Oscar.

== March 7, 1978 (Tuesday) ==
- The Congress of Guatemala elected General Fernando Lucas Garcia as President after no candidate received a majority in the election on March 5. Lucas Garcia took office on July 1.
- Belgian businessman Charles Bracht was kidnapped as he was getting into his car in a parking garage in Antwerp. His body would be found on April 10 in a garbage dump and the autopsy coroner's conclusion would be that Bracht died of injuries sustained while he was trying to resist the kidnappers.
- The pay television cable network Showtime, which had started operations in a limited region of Southern California on July 1, 1976, became available to cable providers and subscribers across the United States, and a rival to the existing Home Box Office (HBO).
- Died: David Lindsay, 71, New Zealand rugby union player for All Blacks national team in its 1928 tour of South Africa

== March 8, 1978 (Wednesday) ==
- An agreement was reached in Italy to form a new government after Prime Minister Giulio Andreotti's cabinet of ministers resigned because the Italian Communist Party (PCI) would no longer agree to abstain from voting against Andreotti's Christian Democrat (DC) ministers. Although the PCI did not succeed in its demand for Communist Party MPs to be given cabinet positions, the PCI and the DC reached an agreement that the Communists would be able to participate in the forming of government policy.
- Ștefan Andrei became the new Foreign Minister of Romania after George Macovescu was appointed as director of the Writers' Union of Romania by President Nicolae Ceaușescu.
- General Reynaldo Pérez Vega, the Deputy Commander of Nicaragua's army, the Guardia Nacional and the chief law enforcement aide of President Anastasio Somoza Debayle, was assassinated by members of the rebel Sandinista National Liberation Front after being lured to the apartment of Nora Astorga, who had hinted that she would accept his wish for a relationship. Three other Sandinistas came out of her bedroom closet, with plans to hold the general for ransom, but slit his throat after he put up a struggle.
- The first radio episode of The Hitchhiker's Guide to the Galaxy, by Douglas Adams, was broadcast, heard on BBC Radio 4.
- Died:
  - Sir Roy Harrod, 78, English economist, author of The Life of John Maynard Keynes and co-discoverer of the Harrod–Domar model
  - Adolf van der Voort van Zijp, 85, Dutch equestrian rider and Olympian who won three gold medals, including the gold for the individual event in 1924

== March 9, 1978 (Thursday) ==
- The sinking of the Chinese ship Guangzhou killed 134 sailors and officers in the Chinese navy. The tragedy in the Zhanjiang harbor followed an explosion of depth charges in the Guangzhou's arsenal, more than two hours earlier, caused by Lieutnenant Lai Sanyang, an ordnance expert who been dismissed from the Chinese Navy.
- Somalia's President, Major General Mohammed Siad Barre, ordered the withdrawal of all Somali troops occupying the disputed Ogaden Region of Ethiopia, bringing an end to the Ogaden War. All troops were withdrawn by March 15.
- Turkey's Prime Minister Bulent Ecevit announced the lifting of restrictions that had been placed on the 15,000 ethnic Greeks living in Turkey. Effective immediately, delays on issuing travel documents to Greek Orthodox religious leaders were ended and the government discontinued its practice of reserving the right to veto the appointment of headmasters in Greek language schools.
- With the deadline of April 6 for the selection of the next president of Israel in place, and no nominees proposed, Prime Minister Menachem Begin nominated a relatively unknown nuclear physicist and native of Egypt, Yitzhak Chavet, to be the next The nomination was eventually accepted by Yitzhak Navon, who was elected unopposed as President of Israel on April 19.
- Born: Sachin Gupta, Indian film director and playwright; in New Delhi
- Died: Sir Reginald Pollard, Australian Lieutenant General who served as Chief of Army for the Australian Army from 1960 to 1963.

== March 10, 1978 (Friday) ==
- The Nuclear Non-Proliferation Act of 1978 was signed into law by U.S. President Jimmy Carter, restricting American export of nuclear fuels (such as uranium and plutonium) to other nations. The bill had passed the House of Representatives unanimously (411 to 0) on September 28 and the U.S. Senate, 88 to 3, on February 7.
- D. D. Pugh was inaugurated as the Chief Minister (comparable to the Governor of a U.S. state or Premier of a Canadian Province) of the Indian state of Meghalaya, after being selected at random by the drawing of lots. The unusual method of picking a head of government was made after the February 25 state election for the 60-seat state legislature, where none of the six parties won the necessary 31 seats for a majority. A coalition was formed by the All Party Hill Leaders Conference (APHLC, led by Pugh), the Hill State People's Democratic Party (HSPDP) and the Public Demands Implementation Convention (PDIC).
- Soyuz 28 returned to Earth with cosmonauts Vladimir Remek and Aleksei Gubarev after its 8-day mission to the Salyut 6 space station.
- For the first time since his imprisonment in 1972, former Philippine Senator and LABAN (Lakas ng Bayan) leader Benigno "Ninoy" Aquino Jr. appeared on GTV-4's Face The Nation, moderated by Ronnie Nathanielsz with panelists Enrique Romualdez of the Daily Express, Reynaldo Naval of the Times Journal and Teddy Owen of Bulletin Today. The interview featured Aquino's only appearance for the 1978 Interim Batasang Pambansa elections, and the topic concerned statements that Defense Minister Juan Ponce Enrile had made on the March 3 show, accusing Aquino of being a CIA agent and of being a member of the Communist party. Aquino vehemently denied the accusations.

== March 11, 1978 (Saturday) ==
- A group of at least eight Palestinian terrorists hijacked a bus at random, then killed 34 Israelis in the Coastal Road massacre. The terrorists traveled in rubber rafts to arrive at a beach near Maagan Michael and killed a bystander, then seized a large taxicab and drove southward and seized the bus and the 57 people on board. Firing weapons at passing cars and crashing through roadblocks, the group reached the outskirts of Tel Aviv where they were ambushed by police at another roadblock. The death toll was the highest from a terrorist attack since the 1948 founding of Israel.
- Turkish Prime Minister Bulent Ecevit and Greek Prime Minister Konstantinos Karamanlis had a summit meeting in Switzerland at Montreux, a little less than four years after the two nations had fought in Cyprus.
- Born:
  - Ha Jung-woo (stage name for Kim Sung-hoon), South Korean film star; in Jamwon-dong near Seoul
  - Didier Drogba, Ivorian footballer with 105 caps for the Ivory Coast national team, and two-time winner of the African Footballer of the Year award; in Abidjan
- Died: Claude François, 39, French pop singer and songwriter, was accidentally electrocuted while attempting to change a light bulb.

== March 12, 1978 (Sunday) ==
- The first round of voting in France was held for all 491 seats of the Assemblée Nationale, with 68 seats filled by candidates who received more than 50% of the vote. Of the 68 seats, 31 were won by the Rassemblement pour la République (RPR) party of Prime Minister Jacques Chirac, and 26 by the Union pour la démocratie française (UDF) of President Valéry Giscard d'Estaing. The runoffs for the other 423 seats were set to take place on March 19.
- Voting was held in El Salvador for the 54 seats of the unicameral Asamblea Legislativa. The National Conciliation Party (Partido de Conciliación Nacional or PCN), led by Carlos Humberto Romero, won 50 of the 54 seats. As with the 1976 election, the other political parties refused to field candidates because of fraudulent voting practices, with the exception of the Salvadoran Popular Party, which won the other four seats.
- In the U.S., leaders of various neo-Nazi groups announced that they were forming a national coalition, the National Socialist Party of America.
- Born:
  - Namkoong Min, South Korean TV and film actor; in Seoul
  - Monty Betham (La’auli Montgomery Junior Betham), professional rugby league player and professional boxer, known for playing on the New Zealand Warriors of the National Rugby League and for both the Samoan and New Zealand national teams; in Auckland
  - Vladimir Arutyunian, Georgian terrorist who attempted to assassinate U.S. President George W. Bush and Georgian President Mikheil Saakashvili in 2005; in Tbilisi, Georgian SSR, Soviet Union
- Died: Efrain Rivera Castillo, 53, Puerto Rican musician, died of a heart attack while in New York City.

== March 13, 1978 (Monday) ==
- Giulio Andreotti's new government as Prime Minister of Italy, with 20 cabinet members, was sworn into office by President Giovanni Leone.
- Guatemala's Congress voted, 35 to 0, to select Fernando Romeo Lucas Garcia, the candidate sponsored by the military, as the new President of Guatemala.
- Died: John Cazale, 42, American stage and film actor known for The Deer Hunter and Dog Day Afternoon, died of lung cancer.

== March 14, 1978 (Tuesday) ==
- At 11:00 in the evening local time (2100 UTC), Israel's defense force invaded Lebanon in Operation Litani, a reprisal for the Coastal Road massacre committed three days earlier, striking primarily the camps of the Al Fatah wing of the Palestine Liberation Organization.
- A group of 60 commandos from the Bijzondere Bijstandseenheid, the counter-terrorism force (now called "M-Squadron") of the Royal Dutch Marines in the Netherlands, rescued all 70 hostages held by terrorists at the Drenthe Province Hall in Assen, where South Moluccan terrorists had seized the building the day before. Nobody was killed in the raid and all 70 hostages were rescued.
- A riot at the Devoto prison at Buenos Aires killed 55 prisoners and a prison guard, and injured 92 others.
- Born:
  - Pieter van den Hoogenband, Netherlands Olympic swimmer who held the world record for the 100m freestyle from 2000 to 2008, and won gold medals in the 2000 and 2004 Olympics; in Maastricht
  - Moon Hee-joon, South Korean pop music singer; in Gangnam-gu, Seoul

== March 15, 1978 (Wednesday) ==
- Somalia and Ethiopia signed a truce to end the Ogaden War.
- Soviet cellist and dissident Mstislav Rostropovich and his wife, opera singer Galina Vishnevskaya, were stripped permanently of their Soviet citizenship, 10 months after the two failed to return from a tour of the West. The decision was announced in Moscow's government-operated newspaper, Izvestia.

== March 16, 1978 (Thursday) ==
- Former Italian Premier Aldo Moro was kidnapped by the Red Brigades terrorist group, who killed five of his bodyguards. Moro, leader of Italy's Christian Democratic Party and a five-time premier of Italy, was in Rome, being escorted to the Italian parliament, when 12 members of the Red Brigades surrounded his car, killed his guards and then dragged him from the vehicle and into another waiting car. Two days later, the kidnappers sent a photo of the captive Moro to Il Messaggero, a Rome newspaper, with a note stating that they would put the former premier on trial, apparently as a response to the Italian government's trial in Turin of 15 members of the Red Brigades.
- The U.S. Senate voted, 68 to 32, to approve a treaty between the United States and Panama, providing that the Panama Canal would remain neutral territory until full control could be transferred to Panama. Debate began on a second treaty that would transfer the control to Panama on December 31, 1999. The vote in favor was one more than the 67 needed for the two-thirds majority required by the U.S. Constitution for approval of a treaty. Debate began next on a separate treaty.
- All 73 people aboard Balkan Bulgarian Airlines Flight 107 were killed when the Tupolev Tu-134 jet crashed after taking off from Sofia to the Polish capital, Warsaw. The aircraft was flying at an altitude of 16,100 feet (4,900 m) when it suddenly lost altitude and crashed.
- Soviet cosmonauts Georgy Grechko and Yuri Romanenko returned to Earth in the Soyuz 27 spacecraft, after a record 96 days and 10 hours in orbit. Their mark surpassed the record of 84 days set by the Skylab 3 astronauts in 1973 and 1974.
- Born: Brooke Burns, American fashion model and game show host; in Dallas

== March 17, 1978 (Friday) ==
- The oil tanker Amoco Cadiz ran aground on the coast of France at Brittany. The American-owned ship's steering mechanism was broken after the ship was broken in half during a storm and ran onto sharp reefs 1 mile (1.6 km) from Cape Finisterre and the community of Portsall. The spill of 24,000,000 U.S. gallons of oil washed ashore on 60 miles (97 km) of shoreline.
- A construction site for the Lemóniz Nuclear Power Plant near Bilbao in southern Spain was bombed by the Basque terrorist organization Euskadi Ta Askatasuna, killing two employees and injuring 14 others.
- In Kinshasa, the African nation of Zaire, 13 people (8 army officers and five civilians) were executed by firing squad on orders of President Mobutu Sese Seko after being convicted of charges of conspiring to sabotage Zaire's economy in order to force Mobutu from office.
- Former U.S. Representative Richard T. Hanna (Democrat from California) pleaded guilty to conspiracy to commit fraud and to defraud the U.S. government, becoming the first American federal official to be convicted in the "Koreagate" scandal.
- Died: Eddie Aikau, 31, Hawaiian surfer and lifeguard, winner of the 1977 Duke Kahanamoku Invitational Surfing Championship, disappeared at sea after attempting to paddle to the island of Lānaʻi after the capsizing of a canoe.

== March 18, 1978 (Saturday) ==
- Zulfikar Ali Bhutto, Prime Minister of Pakistan, was sentenced to death by hanging, for ordering the assassination of a political opponent, Nawah Mohammad Ahmed Khan.
- California Jam II was held at the Ontario Motor Speedway in Ontario, California, attracting more than 300,000 fans, setting a U.S. record for the largest paid attendance to a concert. The show included Ted Nugent, Aerosmith, Foreigner, Heart and Santana.
- The World Boxing Council (WBC) governors voted to declare Ken Norton as the world heavyweight champion and to vacate the title won by Leon Spinks on February 15, after a complaint that Spinks had acted in bad faith by refusing to schedule a bout with Norton, the top-ranked contender. Spinks remained the recognized champion of the World Boxing Association (WBA) after having defeated WBC and WBA champion Muhammad Ali on February 15.
- Born: Antonio Margarito, Hispanic U.S. professional boxer, World Boxing Organization welterweight champion 2002 to 2017, WBA welterweight champion 2008 to 2009; in Torrance, California
- Died: Peggy Wood, 86, American stage, film and television actress known for starring in the TV series Mama

== March 19, 1978 (Sunday) ==
- The second round of parliamentary elections was held in France for 423 of 491 Assemblee National seats where no candidate had won a majority of the votes in the March 12 first round. While the centre-right coalition that included the UDF of President Giscard and the RPR of Prime Minister Chirac had a decreased majority, the leftist parties (the Parti socialiste of François Mitterrand and the Parti communiste français (PCF) of Georges Marchais made only a slight gain. The governing coalition's 298 to 193 lead was narrowed to 288 to 203.
- Died: Gaston Julia, 85, French mathematician noted for the Julia set within complex dynamics

== March 20, 1978 (Monday) ==
- Denise McGregor, a 12-year-old girl, was brutally murdered in the Melbourne suburb of Pascoe Vale, Victoria, in one of the most horrifying crimes in Australian history. The case would remain unsolved more than 45 years later.
- What was, at the time, the second most serious safety-related accident at a U.S. nuclear power plant took place at the Rancho Seco Nuclear Generating Station at Herald, California, near Sacramento. A power supply failure for the plant's non-nuclear instrumentation system led to steam generator dryout, which in turn triggered an automatic reactor shutdown.
- Died: Rafael Alers, 75, Puerto Rican bandleader and composer

== March 21, 1978 (Tuesday) ==
- In Taiwan, the National Assembly of the Republic of China elected Chiang Ching-kuo as the nation's new president, to take office on May 20. Chiang, the son of China and Taiwan's longtime president, Chiang Kai-shek, had been nominated by the ruling Kuomintang party and was the only candidate on the ballot, receiving 1,184 of 1,204 ballots. Yen Chia-kan, who had been Vice President of Taiwan at the time of Chiang Kai-shek's death, had filled the late president's unexpired term.
- The U.S. Supreme Court ruled unanimously in Ballew v. Georgia (435 U.S. 223) that a criminal defendant must be tried by at least six jurors to satisfy the U.S. constitutional requirement for a fair jury trial. The Court struck down a Georgia state law that had permitted five-member jury trials for misdemeanor criminal cases, in a ruling that affected similar five-member jury laws in Virginia and Louisiana.
- No Name (brand) is introduced and launched in Canada.
- Born: Rani Mukerji, Indian film actress and winner of eight Filmfare Awards, including two for Best Actress; known for No One Killed Jessica; in Bombay (Mumbai)
- Died: Cearbhall Ó Dálaigh (Carroll O'Daly), 67, President of the Republic of Ireland from 1974 to 1976

== March 22, 1978 (Wednesday) ==
- Tightrope walker Karl Wallenda of The Flying Wallendas, 73, was killed after falling off a tightrope while walking between two hotels in San Juan, Puerto Rico. Wallenda was balancing on the tightrope that had been stretched between the two towers of the Condado Holiday Inn hotel, and was performing the stunt above hundreds of witnesses as a promotion for the upcoming Pan American Circus. He was more than halfway across when he was knocked off his footing by a strong crosswind, and fell 120 feet (37 m) to the hotel parking lot.
- Nottingham Forest F.C. defeated Liverpool F.C., 1 to 0, to win the Football League Cup of England's First Division. The two teams had played to a scoreless draw on March 18 in front of 100,000 people at Wembley Stadium. The replay, at Old Trafford in Manchester was before a sellout crowd of 54,375 for the smaller venue. The regular season was still in progress after having started on August 20; when the season ended on May 4, Nottingham Forests (with 25 wins, 14 draws and only 3 losses) finished in first place, and Liverpool (24–9–9) in second place.
- Suharto, President of Indonesia, was re-elected unanimously by the People's Consultative Assembly, commonly called the Majelis, to serve a third five-year term. The next day, the Majelis elected Adam Malik as vice president to succeed Hamengkubuwono IX.
- In order to prevent hoarding, the Soviet government took the unusual step of publishing a denial of rumors that it was preparing to raise prices on essential food items, after long lines had been forming in Moscow for sugar and canned milk. The rumors had started when the prices of chocolate, coffee and gasoline were increased on March 1.
- Born: Josh Heupel, American college football player and head coach, AP College Football Player of the Year for 2000, winner of the 2000 Walter Camp Award; in Aberdeen, South Dakota
- Died: Isidro Ayora, 98, President of Ecuador from 1926 to 1931

== March 23, 1978 (Thursday) ==
- The Communist government of the Socialist Republic of Vietnam implemented a program of nationalizing all private businesses in the former South Vietnam, which had been conquered by North Vietnam less than three years earlier. According to one historian, "an army of specially trained personnel— nearly 100,000 cadres, party members and so-called revolutionary masses— simultaneously and suddenly appeared in every private business in the South and in the homes of those who owned those businesses," then conducted comprehensive inventories of goods and equipment and closed the business until items could be confiscated. North Vietnam had implemented a similar program for its own citizens in 1956. Most of the 30,000 businesses seized were operated by ethnic Chinese families in southern Vietnam, and primarily in the Cholon District of Saigon. Wholesale trade and large business transactions were outlawed the next day.
- U.S. President Carter signed Executive Order 12044 directing that U.S. government officials must follow a policy that any future federal regulation was to be "written in plain English and understandable to those who must comply with it." Carter's successor, Ronald Reagan, would rescind the order in 1981, and the reform would be implemented again in 1998 by U.S. President Bill Clinton.
- Born:
  - Perez Hilton (pen name for Mario Lavandeira Jr.), American celebrity columnist; in Miami
  - Nicholle Tom, American film and TV actress; in Hinsdale, Illinois
- Died: André Lallemand, 73, French astronomer known for the "Lallemand camera" and the development of photomultipliers

== March 24, 1978 (Friday) ==
- Members of the United Mine Workers in the U.S. voted overwhelmingly to accept a three-year contract with coal operators and to end the strike that had started on December 6. With over 57 percent of members approving, UMW President Arnold Miller said that he expected to sign the agreement on Saturday and that strikers would return to work in the mines on Monday.
- Born:Tomáš Ujfaluši, Czech Republic footballer with 78 appearances for the national team; in Rýmařov, Czechoslovakia

== March 25, 1978 (Saturday) ==
- All 48 people aboard a Burma Airways flight were killed when the Fokker Friendship 200 turboprop crashed on takeoff from the Rangoon International Airport at Mingaladon.
- UCLA Lady Bruins won the U.S. women's college basketball title, defeating the Maryland Terrapins, 90 to 74, in the tournament held by the Association for Intercollegiate Athletics for Women (AIAW) in Los Angeles.
- The NCAA men's ice hockey championship was played in Providence, Rhode Island, with both finalists from the same conference and the same city. The Boston University Terriers defeated the Boston College Eagles, 5 to 3.
- The University of Oxford rowing team won the 124th Boat Race against the University of Cambridge on the River Thames in London, when a heavy rain commenced a few minutes after the race began. As the 8 rowers of the Cambridge team were attempting to overtake Oxford's eight, the Cambridge boat began to take on water and sank after the crew chose not to place splashboards on their vessel. The sinking was the first in the annual race since 1951.
- An $80,000,000 U.S. space mission, to launch two military communications satellites into geostationary orbit, failed eight minutes after the Titan 3-C rocket carrying them was launched from Cape Canaveral. As the Titan veered off course, range safety officers ordered the destruction of the rocket and the debris fell into the Atlantic Ocean.
- Born: Tomas Brickhill, British-born Zimbabwean filmmaker, known for the 2017 film Cook Off; in London

== March 26, 1978 (Sunday) ==
- The control tower and some other facilities of New Tokyo International Airport, which were scheduled to open on March 31, were illegally occupied and damaged in a terrorist attack by New Left activists, forcing a rescheduling of the airport's opening date to May 20. Police routed the student group the next day.
- The kidnappers of a Belgian industrialist, Baron Edouard-Jean Empain, freed him after nine weeks of captivity after the chief suspect, Alain Caillol, had been captured in a shootout Friday night while attempting to pick up a ransom. Empain, who had been kidnapped on January 23, was released on the outskirts of Paris at Ivry by his captors, who gave him "a small amount of cash" so that he could ride the subway into the city. The Baron reported that he was bound in chains and had a hood placed over his head. Caillol, who walked into a trap set by police, called the other kidnappers and told them, "You must release the baron, it's all lost. You'll never get the ransom."
- A group of 500,000 Basque people in Spain gathered in Madrid to legally celebrate their national day, "Aberri Eguna", for the first time in 42 years. Crowds also gathered in Bilbao, San Sebastian, Vitoria and Pamplona.

== March 27, 1978 (Monday) ==
- In the U.S., officials of the Clinical Center of the National Institutes of Health and of the Food and Drug Administration called a news conference and announced that they had identified "a new form of hepatitis that accounts for almost all the disease now occurring after blood transfusions", and referred to the disease as "Non-A, Non-B". The new strain of the virus is now referred to as "Hepatitis C" and commonly as "HEP-C".
- Clemens Kapuuo, Chief of the Herero people of South-West Africa and a leading contender to become the first black leader of an independent Namibia, was assassinated in Windhoek by two black gunmen. Herrero tribal leaders blamed the SWAPO guerrilla organization, while SWAPO blamed the government of South Africa, which was administering South-West Africa as a trusteeship.
- American coal miners who were members of the United Mine Workers (UMW) returned to work after a strike that lasted 112 days and forced cutbacks in electricity and heating use by facilities that relied upon coal. The strike, which started on December 6, was followed by 160,000 UMW members walking out on the job.
- The University of Kentucky Wildcats won the NCAA basketball championship in St. Louis, defeating the Duke University Blue Devils, 94 to 88.
- The dance musical revue Dancin', directed and choreographed by Bob Fosse, premiered on Broadway at the Broadhurst Theatre, for the first of 1,774 performances. It would run for four years, closing on June 27, 1982.
- Born:
  - Romesh Ranganathan, British comedian; in Crawley, West Sussex
  - Phil Rajzman, Brazilian professional surfer and two-time World Surf League champion in 2007 and 2016; in Rio de Janeiro.

== March 28, 1978 (Tuesday) ==
- San Francisco's City Council enacted the United States's most comprehensive gay rights bill.
- The Supreme Court of the United States handed down a 5–3 decision in Stump v. Sparkman, a controversial case involving involuntary sterilization and judicial immunity.

== March 29, 1978 (Wednesday) ==
- The long-running U.S. CBS variety program The Carol Burnett Show presented its 279th and last episode, ending a run of 11 seasons. The final presentation was a two-hour farewell program "A Special Evening with Carol Burnett" and had videotaped in front of a live audience 12 days earlier.
- Guerrillas from the Zimbabwe African People's Union kidnapped 431 black Rhodesian students, ranging in age from 10 to 19, along with nine adult staff, from the missionary-operated Tegwani School in Plumtree, Rhodesia. The students and staff were forcibly marched for 30 miles (48 km) to the neighboring nation of Botswana where they were intercepted by Botswanan officials who interviewed each person. all but 37 of the students, and all of the adults, elected to go back to their families in Rhodesia, and were driven to the bridge at the Raamaquabane River, where they crossed back over.
- Born: Igor Rakočević, Serbian professional basketball player, three-time winner of the Alphonso Ford EuroLeague Top Scorer Trophy; in Belgrade, SR Serbia, Yugoslavia

== March 30, 1978 (Thursday) ==
- Rhodesia's first multiracial government, the transitional 4-member Executive Council, took office in preparation for appointing a white and black African cabinet of members to administer the southern African nation until a unicameral parliament could be elected in December. White Prime Minister Ian Smith was joined on the Executive Council by Bishop Abel Muzorewa of the United African National Council (UANC); Ndabaningi Sithole of the African National Council (ANC); and Chief Jeremiah Chirau of the Zimbabwe United People's Organisation (ZAPO).
- Voters in the West African nation of Ghana participated in a referendum on whether to approve the proposal by General Ignatius Kutu Acheampong for "UNIGOV", or "union government", with no political parties at all. The wording of the question was "Do you approve whether or not some form of Union Government would become the basis of Ghana's political system?", and at least 60% of the voters were in favor, and slightly less than 40% against.
- Italy's ruling Christian Democratic Party (DC) announced that it would refuse to negotiate with the Red Brigades to secure the release of DC's leader, Aldo Moro, who had been kidnapped by the terrorist group on March 16. The DC response was published in an editorial in the DC's party newspaper as a reply to a plea that Moro had been allowed to write by the terrorists.
- Mohammed Ali Halabi formed a government of 35 ministers as the new Prime Minister of Syria, following the resignation of Premier Abdul Rahman Khleifawi.
- In Sri Lanka, the popular Tamil language film Vaadai Kaatru ("North Wind") was released.

== March 31, 1978 (Friday) ==
- Soviet diplomat Arkady Shevchenko, a high-ranking advisor to Foreign Minister Andrei Gromyko as well as being the Under-Secretary-General of the United Nations and an informant for the U.S. Central Intelligence Agency (CIA), received a cable message from the Kremlin directing him to return to Moscow for "consultations". Concerned that his contacts with the CIA might have been discovered by the KGB Soviet spy agency, and worried that if he obeyed the order, he would probably never be permitted to leave the Soviet Union, he spent the next 10 days making his plan to defect to the United States.
- The American Motors Corporation (AMC) and the French auto manufacturer Renault announced that they had entered into a joint venture for combining on production and distribution of motor vehicles.
- Jimmy Carter became the first incumbent U.S. president to visit black Africa, arriving in Lagos, the capital of Nigeria, after flying directly from Rio de Janeiro in Brazil.
- The U.S. successfully launched the civilian communications satellite Intelsat IVA F-6 from Cape Canaveral, five days after the failed launch of two U.S. military satellites.
- Died:
  - Astrid Allwyn, 72, American stage and film actress
  - Charles H. Best, 79, co-discoverer (with Dr. Frederick Banting) of insulin in 1921.
