= Liesel Markowski =

German musicologist (1928–2019)

- Born: Liesel Carow; 1928; Rostock, Free State of Mecklenburg-Schwerin, Germany
- Died: 2019 (aged 90–91)
- Education: Hanna Eisler Music Academy; Humboldt University
- Occupations: Musicologist music journalist
- Political party: SED (1956–1989); PDS (from 1990)
- Spouse: Paul Markowski (1929–1978)
- Children: 1 daughter

Liesel Markowski (born: Liesel Carow; 1 July 1928 – 23 January 2019) was a German musicologist.

== Life ==
Liesel Carow was born in Rostock. Her father was a successful entrepreneur with a higher degree in Economics, but in 1940 he was conscripted for military service and in 1945 he died from wounds acquired in the fighting. Between 1943 and 1945, Carow lived with her mother at the family's beachside holiday home at Markgrafenheide in order to avoid the bombing over the city. From there she made her way to the Lyzeum (as the school was then known) in Rostock each day, which involved the narrow gauge coastal railway, a lot of walking, and a journey time in each direction of two and a half hours. War ended in May 1945. In 1947, she passed her school final exams (Abitur) which under many circumstances would have cleared the path to a university level education. Since 1945, however, a large central portion of Germany, including Rostock, had been administered as the Soviet occupation zone. As the daughter of a "bourgeois" small businessman – even a dead one – Liesel Carow found herself at or near the back of the queue for university places, and she was unable to study Law or Chemistry at Rostock as she had hoped. However, her mother, who had trained as a seamstress and always done the sewing for the family, had taught her the basics of tailoring. She accordingly undertook an apprenticeship in the garment industry, emerging with both a qualification and an enhanced level of socialist credibility for the emerging "workers' state". She also pursued music as a hobby, singing in a Bach Choir and taking singing lessons. That provided a basis from which she was able to gain a place at the newly formed German Music Academy (later the "Hanna Eisler Music Academy") in Berlin, where she studied singing. Later she switched to Musicology, and it was in this discipline that she passed her exams at the Humboldt University of Berlin in 1959.

In 1948, she met Paul Markowski as a "Masked ball" in Rostock where he was a student whose family had moved west from Danzig. Markowski was a brilliant student of foreign languages and it was after they had both moved to Berlin in the early 1950s that they became better acquainted with one another. Liesel Carow married Paul Markowski in 1955. The marriage produced a daughter. In 1978, still relatively young, Liesel Markowski was widowed. Many years after that she would still warmly endorse a fellow student's affectionate description of the young Paul Makowski back in the early 1950s as "the smallest, the poorest and the best" ("der Kleinste, der Ärmste und der Beste").

On leaving the Humboldt in 1959 Liesel Markowski almost immediately obtained a job as a contributing editor to music magazine Musik und Gesellschaft which by this time had become the official organ of the state backed Association of Composers and Musicologists ("Verband der Komponisten und Musikwissenschaftler der DDR" / VKM). In 1973 she took over from Hansjürgen Schaefer as editor in chief. During nearly three decades she contributed a succession of articles and reviews to the publication, also contributing concert reviews to other publications. "Musik und Gesellschaft" was a casualty of reunification in 1990, but her thoughtful contributions have continued to appear in other specialist and national publications including Neues Deutschland.

After her husband was killed, during the middle 1980s Liesel Markowski studied for and obtained her doctorate. Her work was supervised by Günter Mayer from the Humboldt University although the doctorate itself was awarded by another Berlin academic institution, the Central Committee's Academy for Social Sciences. Her dissertation was entitled "Mass Media and Music in the theory and practice of the composer and music theoretician Hanns Eisler ("Massenmedien und Musik in der kompositorischen Praxis und im theoretischen Denken Hanns Eislers"). The return to full-time research involved taking a temporary break from her editorial duties and her salary was for a time suspended, but she was supported by a stipendium during this period. Eisler, the man who had composed the East German national anthem, was an interesting and fruitful choice of subject on various levels, although unfortunately the dissertation has not yet been published.

She died in Berlin-Pankow at age 90.

== Awards and honours ==
- 1978 Patriotic Order of Merit in bronze
- 1988 Patriotic Order of Merit in silver
