= February 1978 =

Month of 1978

<<	February 1978					>>
Su	Mo	Tu	We	Th	Fr	Sa
			1	2	3	4
5	6	7	8	9	10	11
12	13	14	15	16	17	18
19	20	21	22	23	24	25
26	27	28

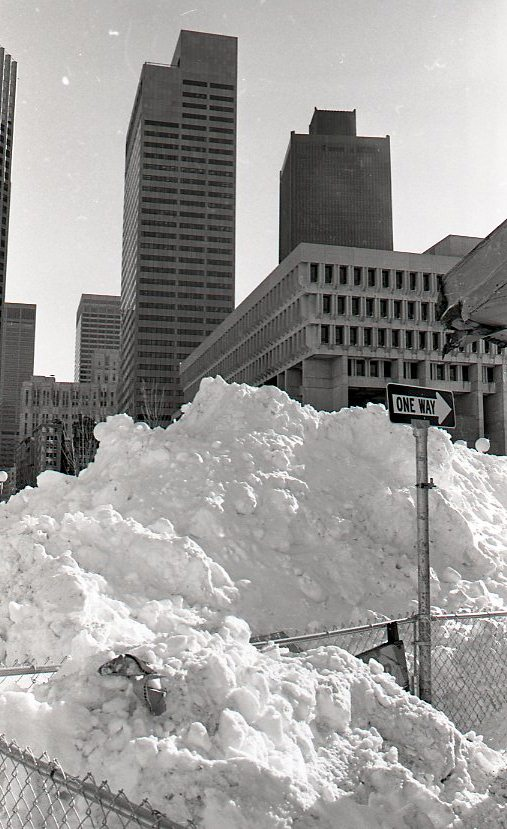
February 5, 1978: Blizzard paralyzes the Northeastern United States (pictured: snow outside Boston City Hall after the Blizzard of '78

The following events occurred in February 1978:

== February 1, 1978 (Wednesday) ==
- Film director Roman Polanski skipped bail in the United States and fled to France, after pleading guilty to charges of engaging in sex with a 13-year-old girl.

== February 2, 1978 (Thursday) ==
- Kaiser Matanzima, Prime Minister of the semi-independent South African bantustan of Transkei, announced that he would break diplomatic relations with South Africa and ordered all members of the South African Defence Force to leave the country by March 31. In that Transkei was not recognized by any of the other nations of the world, the diplomatic rift lasted only temporarily.
- In the Central African Republic, Henri Maïdou, the Minister of Education, Youth, Sports, Arts, and Culture, charged with reforming the nation's school system, announced that school uniforms would be required for all Central African schoolchildren by October 1, to be purchased at the students' expense from Compagnie industrielle ouanguienne des textiles, a textile manufacturer owned by the family of Emperor Bokassa the First. When a group of high school students protested having to buy the uniforms, Bokassa would order the deaths of more than 100 of them starting on April 17, 1979.
- The Peter Maxwell Davies composition, Symphony No. 1, was given its first performance, making its debut at the Royal Festival Hall with the Philharmonia Orchestra conducted by Simon Rattle.
- The Washington Star, the financially-ailing evening newspaper for the U.S. capital city, became a subsidiary of magazine company Time Inc.
- Born:
  - Nelson Chamisa, Zimbabwean politician who was the runner-up in the 2018 presidential election; in Fort Victoria, Rhodesia
  - Barry Ferguson, Scottish footballer with 45 caps for the Scotland national team; in Hamilton, South Lanarkshire

== February 3, 1978 (Friday) ==
- The United States ordered Vietnam's Ambassador to the United States, Dinh Ba Thi, to leave the country after allegations that he was involved in espionage, following the arrest of David Truong. The U.S. had reserved the right to expel foreign diplomats as part of the agreement for the UN General Assembly to have a permanent location in New York City. Vietnam's UN office said that the Ambassador would not leave, stating that the chargers were "completely fabricated" and "detrimental" and "totally fabricated," and added, "For these reasons, Ambassador Dinh Ba Thi will continue to carry out normally his duties as the representative of the Socialist Republic of Vietnam." Vietnam's government recalled Ambassador Thi two days later, giving the reason as "the U.S. government is trying to disturb activities of the Vietnamese ambassador".
- Voting was held in the tiny European principality of Liechtenstein for all 15 seats of its parliament, the Landtag. The Vaterländische Union (VU) captured a seat held by the ruling Fortschrittliche Bürgerpartei (FBP), gaining an 8 to 7 majority and allowing Deputy Prime Minister Hans Brunhart of the VU to form a government as the nation's new prime minister, succeeding Walter Kieber on April 26. At the same time, Kieber succeeded Brunhart as the Deputy Premier.
- Serial killer Velma Barfield committed her sixth and last murder as her boyfriend, Rowland Taylor, died from arsenic poisoning. An autopsy revealed the cause, and an exhumation of Velma's late husband Jennings Barfield showed traces of arsenic as well. Velma Barfield would be executed on November 2, 1984.
- The official Soviet news agency TASS entered the world of cryptozoology and announced in the Communist nation's press that scientists had documented reports from Siberia of "Chuchunaa", a 6.5 feet (2.0 m) tall human-like creature that "feeds on raw meat, wears a reindeer skin and shrieks a lot" and that was said "to have frightened reindeer breeders, hunters, and mushroom and berry collectors."
- Born:
  - Amal Alamuddin Clooney, Lebanese-born British lawyer and barrister; in Beirut
  - Joan Capdevila, Spanish footballer with 60 caps for the national team; in Tàrrega
  - Fátima Flórez, Argentine actress and comedian; in Olivos, Buenos Aires Province

== February 4, 1978 (Saturday) ==
- J. R. Jayewardene became the second President of Sri Lanka, succeeding William Gopallawa. Jayewardene had been Prime Minister since July 23, 1977, and guided the transition of Sri Lanka, formerly Ceylon, to a presidential system of government.
- Born: Danna Garcia, German-born Colombian telenovela actress; in West Berlin
- Died: Bergen Evans, 73, American linguistic authority at Northwestern University, author of A Dictionary of Contemporary American Usage and The Natural History of Nonsense, former TV host known for the shows The Last Word and Down You Go

== February 5, 1978 (Sunday) ==
- The Northeastern United States blizzard of 1978 struck the New England region and the New York metropolitan area, killing about 100 people, and causing over US$520 million in damage.
- Elections for President and for the legislature were held in the Central American nation of Costa Rica. Rodrigo Carazo Odio of the new Coalición Unidad (CU) defeated Luis Alberto Monge of the long-time ruling Partido Liberación Nacional (PLN). The CU, composed of four right-wing opposition parties also ended the PLN's plurality in the 57-seat Legislative Assembly, with a 27 to 25 lead over the PLN.
- Djiboutian Foreign Minister Abdallah Mohamed Kamil took office as the prime minister of Djibouti, succeeding Ahmed Dini Ahmed. Kamil was the third prime minister of the northeast African nation, which had been independent for slightly more than six months.
- Born: Samuel Sánchez, Spanish professional bicyclist and 2008 Olympic gold medalist; in Oviedo

== February 6, 1978 (Monday) ==
- The Protection of Children Against Sexual Exploitation Act of 1977 (SEOC), the first U.S. federal law criminalizing the production and sale of child pornography, was signed into law by U.S. President Jimmy Carter after passing unanimously in both the U.S. Senate (401 to 0) and the U.S. House of Representatives (by voice vote, with none opposed).
- The Prime Minister of Burma (now Myanmar), General Ne Win, began Operation Nagamin, beginning mass arrests of Muslim minorities in the village of Sakkipara and the surrounding Arakan state. Over the next three months, more than 200,000 Rohingya Muslims would flee to Bangladesh.
- Muriel Buck Humphrey, widow of Hubert Humphrey, was sworn into office to finish out the remainder of his term as U.S. Senator for Minnesota. Humphrey had died of cancer on January 13.
- The government of Chad severed all diplomatic relations with Libya in the wake of Libya's direct assistance of Chadian rebels and brought the issue of Libyan involvement before the United Nations Security Council. Relations were restored 18 days later at an international peace conference.
- Born:
  - Olena Zelenska (née Olena Kiyashko), Ukrainian screenwriter and First Lady of Ukraine as wife of President Volodymyr Zelenskyy; in Kryvyi Rih, Ukrainian SSR, Soviet Union
  - Yael Naim, French-born Israeli singer; in Paris

== February 7, 1978 (Tuesday) ==
- Cornelius "Connie" Mulder, South Africa's Minister of Bantu Administration and Development, and Bantu Education, said in a speech to the National Assembly that after the completion of resettlement of South Africa's black residents to nine bantustans, referred to as "homelands", no black Africans would be allowed to hold South African citizenship. The paramount chief of the Zulu people, Gatsha Buthelezi, declared that the black majority would not cooperate, commenting "If it is the policy of the ruling National Party ot complete black dispossession by making us foreigners, it would be much better to do this by force, as has always been the case, ratherthan to expect us to cooperate in its plans."
- The longest debate in United States Senate history began when discussion began on whether or not to ratify the Panama Canal Treaty signed in 1977. The sessions were the first for the full Senate (as opposed to committee and subcommittee hearings) to be broadcast and were transmitted on radio because the chamber was unprepared for the setting up of television cameras. The debate would last for more than two months before closing on April 18.
- The Italian Communist Party (PCI) cleared the way for a new government of ministers to be formed by Prime Minister Giulio Andreotti as PCI leader Enrico Berlinguer announced that it would no longer seek to be part of Andreotti's cabinet in a coalition government. In the 1976 elections, the Communists had won 229 of the 630 seats in the Chamber of Deputies and Andreotti's Christian Democrats had won 262, both short of the 316 seats required for a majority. Andreotti's cabinet had remained intact for 17 months as the leftist parties abstained on votes of no confidence.
- Born:
  - Ashton Kutcher, American TV and film actor known for That '70s Show and Dude, Where's My Car?; in Cedar Rapids, Iowa
  - Omotola Jalade Ekeinde, Nigerian film actress, singer and philanthropist; in Lagos State
  - Daniel Van Buyten, Belgian footballer with 83 caps for the Belgium national team; in Chimay
- Died:
  - Anil Kumar Gain, 59, Indian mathematician and statistician
  - Ghulam Mustafa Tabassum, 78, Pakistani poet known for creating the children's character Tot Batot

== February 8, 1978 (Wednesday) ==
- The popular musical Ain't Misbehavin', a tribute to African-American jazz artist Thomas "Fats" Waller, was given its first performance, premiering at the Manhattan Theatre Club cabaret in New York City before opening on Broadway on May 9.
- In a yes-or-no election in Syria, voters approved the re-election of President Hafez al-Assad to another 7-year term of office. According to the government, only 4,798 out of 3,980,527 voters chose to vote against Assad, or slightly more than one-tenth of one percent. The Syrian government reported a 97% turnout of the 4.1 million registered voters.
- The United States Senate allowed regular broadcasting of its proceedings on the radio for the first time, permitting coverage of speeches on whether to ratify the Panama Canal Treaty.

== February 9, 1978 (Thursday) ==
- Don Jamieson, Canada's Secretary of State for External Affairs, ordered 11 officials of the Soviet Union to leave the North American nation. Jamieson told the House of Commons that the move came after the Soviets had attempted to recruit a top official of the Royal Canadian Mounted Police as a spy. Two other Soviet officials, who were away from Canada, would not be allowed to return.
- William H. Webster, a U.S. federal appeals court judge, was confirmed by the U.S. Senate as the new Director of the Federal Bureau of Investigation (FBI). Webster was sworn into office on February 23.
- The Budd Company unveiled the first self-propelled railcar, the SPV-2000, at a conference in Philadelphia.
- Serial killer Ted Bundy killed his final victim, a 12-year-old girl in Lake City, Florida, after luring her into his van outside of her junior high school. He discarded her body, which would not be found until April 7, at Suwanee River State Park, 43 miles (69 km) west of Lake City.
- Plans fell through for the sale of Major League Baseball's Oakland A's to a multimillionaire who intended to move the club to Denver in time for the 1978 season. Marvin Davis had offered Charlie O. Finley $12.5 million for the team in December, but the A's had 10 years remaining on their lease with the Oakland-Alameda County Coliseum.
- The U.S. television series James at 15, starring Lance Kerwin, received its highest ratings ever in the first TV episode to deal with the subject of a teenager's loss of virginity. In that James's first sexual encounter came on his 16th birthday, the program was re-titled James at 16. The program ran for only nine more episodes before being canceled.
- Died: Daniel Reed, 85, American actor, playwright and screenwriter
- Died: Herbert Kappler, 70, convicted German war criminal responsible for the Ardeatine massacre in Italy, died at home less than six months after his August 15 escape from a prison hospital.

== February 10, 1978 (Friday) ==
- The passenger ship Miryan Adelaida, carrying more than 100 passengers, sank in the Paraguay River after capsizing in a violent storm.
- The crash of a Douglas C-47 military transport airplane of the Uruguayan Air Force killed all 44 people on board after going down shortly after taking off from Artigas on a flight to Montevideo.
- The crash of Columbia Pacific Airlines Flight 23 on takeoff from Richland, Washington, killed all 17 people aboard. The Beechcraft 99 was scheduled for a 170 miles (270 km) flight to Seattle and was "seen to begin a steep climb" at an angle of 20 degrees to an altitude of 400 feet (120 m) and "then turned left and descended nose-down at a flight path angle" of about 45 degrees "until it struck the ground 1,669 feet (509 m) past the runway end and caught fire."
- A landslide at the Verdugo Hills Cemetery, near Tujunga, California, unearthed at least 30 graves of people who had been buried on the hillside. Los Angeles County coroner Thomas Noguchi told reporters that most of the people whose remains were found "appear to have been buried two or three years ago." One resident of Tujunga found three corpses in his yard.
- Van Halen, an American rock band founded by brothers Eddie Van Halen and Alex Van Halen, with the addition of lead vocalist David Lee Roth and bass guitarist Michael Anthony, released its first album.
- Born: Don Omar (born William Omar Landrón Rivera), Puerto Rican rapper and reggaeton musician; in Santurce, San Juan

== February 11, 1978 (Saturday) ==
- The crash of Pacific Western Airlines Flight 314 killed 44 of the 50 people on board. The Boeing 737 went down as it was approaching Cranbrook, British Columbia, on a flight from Calgary. Snow on Runway 16 was being plowed in anticipation of Flight 314's arrival scheduled for 1:05 in the afternoon, but the airplane arrived 10 minutes early while the snowplow was still on the runway. When one of the crew noticed the plow, the pilot attempted to climb again and then stalled at 400 feet (120 m). The survivors were five passengers and a flight attendant who had been sitting in the tail section that had broken off when the airplane crashed.
- The People's Republic of China lifted its ban on works by Aristotle, William Shakespeare and Charles Dickens.
- The Greek Cypriot terrorist organization EOKA B, which had overthrown the government of Cyprus in 1974 and carried out massacres, assassinations and a war with Turkey, announced that it was disbanding.
- Died:
  - James B. Conant, 84, American chemist, college president and diplomat who served as President of Harvard University (from 1933 to 1953) and as the first U.S. Ambassador to West Germany (from 1955 to 1957)
  - Harry Martinson, 73, Swedish writer, joint winner of the 1974 Nobel Prize in Literature, committed suicide in a hospital by cutting his stomach open and bleeding to death.

== February 12, 1978 (Sunday) ==
- Elections for President and for the bicameral Congress were held in the South American nation of Paraguay. General Alfredo Stroessner won his sixth term as President of Paraguay, receiving almost 91 percent of the vote, with Germán Acosta Caballero finishing second with less than 6 percent. Stroessner's Colorado Party retained control of both houses of the legislature, being allotted two-thirds of the seats in the Senate (20 of 30) and in the Chamber of Deputies (40 of 60).
- Signed on February 16, 1976, the Barcelona Convention, officially the Convention for Protection of the Mediterranean Sea against Pollution, went into effect for the 23 nations with ports on the Mediterranean Sea.
- Born:
  - Charles McArther Emmanuel, a/k/a Chuckie Taylor a/k/a Roy M. Belfast Jr., U.S.-born Liberian government official who established and commanded the Anti-Terrorist Unit to enforce the rule of his father, Liberian president Charles Taylor, from 1997 to 2002; in Boston. Arrested in 2006 while traveling in the U.S., Emmanuel became the first person convicted under a 1994 law prohibiting American citizens from participating in torture outside of the United States and is serving a 99-year sentence in prison.
  - Gethin Jones, Welsh television host known for Blue Peter and Remembrance Week; in Cardiff

== February 13, 1978 (Monday) ==
- A bomb exploded outside the Hilton Hotel in Sydney, Australia, where the Commonwealth Heads of Government Meeting was taking place with 12 foreign leaders. Two garbage collectors and a policeman standing guard at the entrance to the hotel lounge were killed, and 9 other people were injured. The bombing, for which Australian Evan Pederick was convicted, was the first incidence of domestic terrorism in Australia.
- At Ottawa, Canada's Prime Minister Pierre Trudeau opened a three-day conference with the premiers of all 10 Canadian provinces in order to resolve the nation's economic problems, including 8.5% unemployment and 9.5% annual inflation.
- In the U.S. state of Utah, surgery separating conjoined twins was performed by specialists at the Primary Children's Hospital in Salt Lake City. The twin girls, born on February 2, shared a liver and the operation was made more complicated by the fact that the twin with the stronger heart provided the oxygenated blood for both children.
- Soft drink manufacturer PepsiCo Inc. and the Taco Bell restaurant chain announced jointly an acquisition agreement, with Pepsi to purchase Taco Bell for $125 million with the exchange of 1.43 shares of PepsiCo for every one share of Taco Bell.
- Born: Niklas Bäckström, Finnish ice hockey goaltender in the National Hockey League and the Finland national ice hockey team; in Helsinki

== February 14, 1978 (Tuesday) ==
- Argentina's military government created the National Registry of Worship and required that all active religious groups, except for those within the Roman Catholic Church, were required to submit their credentials to the Ministry of Foreign Relations and Worship to operate legally within the South American nation.
- The government of Iraq, led by Saddam Hussein, began the "Archaeological Restoration of Babylon Project" to reconstruct features of the ancient city of Babylon over the ruins near the modern city of Hillah. Plans were made for recreating the Southern Palace of Nebuchadnezzar II, who ruled in the 6th century BC, creating a 100-foot (30 m) entrance arch, and reinforcing the Lion of Babylon. The proposed remaking of the Hanging Gardens of Babylon and the ziggurat of Etemenanki never took place.
- An industrial accident killed eight employees of the Horween Leather Company plant, a tannery in the U.S. city of Chicago, and injured 35 others. According to investigators, a delivery truck driver ignored signs and pumped sodium hydrosulfide into a tank of tanning acid, and the reaction created a cloud of hydrogen sulfide.
- The ballet Mayerling, choreographed by Kenneth MacMillan to the music of Franz Liszt and arranged by John Lanchbery, was performed for the first time, as danced by The Royal Ballet.
- Born:
  - Danai Gurira, American actress known for The Walking Dead TV series and the Black Panther film series; in Grinnell, Iowa
  - Darius Songaila, Lithuanian pro basketball player and assistant coach in the NBA and for the Lithuania men's national team; in Kapsukas, Lithuanian SSR, Soviet Union (now Marijampolė, Lithuania)

== February 15, 1978 (Wednesday) ==
- Leon Spinks, a 10 to 1 underdog in betting, won the world heavyweight boxing championship in a surprising 15-round decision over defending champion Muhammad Ali in Las Vegas. Spinks, a former U.S. Marine, was competing in only his eighth professional fight. As 5,298 watched at the Hilton Pavilion and millions of others watched on television, the 2 to 1 split decision was revealed, with Art Lurie pointing the fight 143 to 142 for Ali, Lou Tabat 145 to 140 for Spinks, and Harold Buck scoring 144 to 141 for Spinks.
- Rhodesia, one of only two remaining white-ruled African nations (the other being South Africa), announced that it would implement multiracial democracy within two years. White Prime Minister Ian Smith appeared with three moderate black leaders, Bishop Abel Muzorewa, Chief Jeremiah Chirau and Dr. Elliot Gabellah, to announce a plan to make a transition to black majority rule.
- Serial killer Ted Bundy was finally apprehended after a patrolman in Pensacola, Florida, spotted a Volkswagen that had been reported stolen earlier in the month. Bundy, who presented identification as Kenneth Misner, was found with the credit cards of two Florida State University students who had been killed on January 15, and was identified by fingerprints taken from him at the Pensacola jail and a Colorado jail from which he had escaped on December 31.

== February 16, 1978 (Thursday) ==
- The first dial-up bulletin board system, CBBS, went online for people who owned a microcomputer and a modem. Developed by Ward Christensen and Randy Suess of the Chicago Area Computer Hobbyists' Exchange (CACHE), the computerized bulletin board system made it possible for CACHE members to post information and read posts from other members.
- The National Savings Movement, started during World War One in 1916 by the British government, was discontinued after a final meeting of its Board of Trustees.
- Serial killers Kenneth Bianchi and Angelo Buono Jr., cousins who worked as a pair in the Hillside Strangler case initially believed to have been committed by one person, claimed their 10th and last victim. Cindy Hudspeth, a 20-year-old student and waitress, had come to Buono's Auto Upholstery Shop in Glendale, California, as a customer. When Bianchi arrived, the pair decided to make Hudspeth their last victim. She was kidnapped, raped and then strangled to death. Her nude body was then placed in the trunk of her car, which was pushed down a hillside. The two were not arrested until Bianchi, on his own, murdered two women in Bellingham, Washington.
- Serial killer John Wayne Gacy killed and buried 19-year-old William Kindred and buried him in the crawl space beneath his home in the Chicago suburb of Norwood Park, Illinois. Kindred was the last of 26 young men and boys whose body was buried in the basement because Gacy had run out of room. On Gacy's final five murders, the victims' bodies were thrown in the Des Plaines River. Gacy, who killed 33 victims over almost seven years, would be arrested on December 21, 1978.
- Born:
  - Philipp Plein, German-born Swiss fashion designer, entrepreneur, and CEO of the Plein Group; in Munich, West Germany
  - Tia Hellebaut, Belgian track and field athlete, 2008 Olympic gold medalist in the women's high jump; in Antwerp
  - Yekaterina Volkova, Russian long-distance runner, winner of the 2007 women's world championship in the 3000 meter steeplechase; in Zheleznogorsk, Kursk Oblast, Russian SFSR, Soviet Union

== February 17, 1978 (Friday) ==
- The explosion of an IRA incendiary bomb killed 12 people and severely injured 30 others at the restaurant of the La Mon House hotel at Comber, County Down, near Belfast. The bomb exploded at 9:00 in the evening while 450 diners and employees were inside.
- A motorcycle gang war in Canada began between the Hells Angels Motorcycle Club and the Outlaws Motorcycle Club, after Hells Angels enforcer Yves Trudeau shot and killed Robert Côté of the Outlaws in Montreal, outside the Brasserie Joey tavern. The feud would last for more than six years.
- Born:
  - Zhang Yi, Chinese film and TV actor, award winner known for Cock and Bull (2016), Operation Red Sea (2018) and Cliff Walkers (2021), winner of two Golden Rooster Awards; in Harbin
  - Rory Kinnear, English stage, film and TV actor known for Peterloo and Bank of Dave, winner of two Laurence Olivier Awards; in Hammersmith, London
  - Jacob Wetterling, American kidnapping and murder victim whose death at the age of 11 led to the 1994 passage of the federal Jacob Wetterling Act, requiring all U.S. states to maintain a sex offender registry to require a person convicted of any crime against a minor to report his or her address to a state agency; in Long Prairie, Minnesota (d. 1989). The crime would not be solved until 2016.

== February 18, 1978 (Saturday) ==
- In an event that triggered the Iranian Revolution that would topple the Iranian monarchy within one year, at least 14 people were killed and 125 injured in the city of Tabriz when police intervened to stop a ceremony to commemorate the deaths of protesters on January 9.
- The city of Faya-Largeau in northern Chad fell to FROLINAT (Front de libération nationale du Tchad), the Chadian rebel group led by Hissène Habré and supported by the Libyan Army.
- The very first Ironman Triathlon race, which would later develop into a series of races worldwide for the Ironman World Championship, was started on the island of Oahu in the U.S. state of Hawaii. A followup to triathlon events staged in San Diego, California in 1974 and 1975, the event was the first to refer to its champion as an "Ironman" and followed the standards used in three existing long-distance events: the Waikiki Roughwater Swim (2.4 mi (3.9 km)), the Around-Oahu Bike Race (115 mi (185 km)) and the Honolulu Marathon (26.219 mi (42.195 km)), with all three to be run on the same day in the Ironman competition with one change, making the bicycle race 115 mi (185 km). Of 15 entrants, 12 finished the race, with Gordon Haller, a U.S. Navy Communications Specialist, finishing first in 11 hours and 46 minutes.
- Born: Sarah Jio, American journalist and novelist known for Blackberry Winter; in Seattle
- Died:
  - Maggie McNamara, 48, American stage, film and TV actress, committed suicide with an overdose of barbiturates.
  - Yusuf Sibai, 60, the Egyptian Minister of Culture, editor of the newspaper Al Ahram and a popular novelist, was assassinated by two Abu Nidal Organization terrorists— one from Kuwait and the other from Iraq— while he was attending an international conference of cultural officials at the Nicosia Hilton Hotel in Cyprus. The terrorists then took 30 other delegates hostage and threatened to kill their captives unless they were flown out of the country.

== February 19, 1978 (Sunday) ==
- A rescue attempt by Egypt's Sa'ka Forces to rescue 15 hostages on a Cyprus Airways DC-8 at Larnaca on the island of Cyprus succeeded in saving 14 of the captives, but at the cost of the lives of 18 of the 76 commandos and the wounding of 18 others during a battle with troops of the Cypriot National Guard. Eight Cypriot soldiers and two journalists were injured as well. The government of Cyprus had agreed to let the two Abu Nidal Organization gunmen safe passage out of the country and 19 of the hostages were released, while the terrorists kept 12 others to take with them, along with the airline's crew of three. After departing Nicosia, the DC-8 was refused permission to land by the nations of Algeria, South Yemen and Libya, and returned to Cyprus and landed at Larnaca. According to the government of Cyprus, negotiators had reached a deal with the terrorists when Egyptian C-130 Hercules made an unauthorized landing with the commando force.
- Bobby Allison won the Daytona 500 NASCAR race after four favorites— Richard Petty, Darrell Waltrip, David Pearson and A. J. Foyt— crashed because of tires that disintegrated at high speed. Petty, Waltrip and Pearson, were "far ahead of the rest of the pack" when a blowout happened on one of Petty's tires and the three leaders slid into the infield. Foyt took the lead, but lost control when his car ran over tire debris from Benny Parsons's car.
- Died: Pankaj Mullick, 72, Indian film composer, singer and actor

== February 20, 1978 (Monday) ==
- Chad's President Felix Malloum commenced Opération Tacaud to call in French Army troops to defend the Chadian capital, N'Djamena, from the FROLINAT rebels led by Hissène Habré.
- The Office of National Assessments (ONA) was established in Australia as an intelligence agency directly accountable to the prime minister, to complement the existing Australian Secret Intelligence Service (ASIS) and the Australian Security Intelligence Organisation (ASIO).
- Representatives of the government of Canada and of the Canadian province of Quebec signed an immigration agreement allowing Quebec decision-making power in independently choosing its immigrants, who would then still have to be approved by Ottawa.
- Marco's Pizza, which would become a nationwide chain in the United States with over 1,000 restaurants, opened its first location as Italian immigrant Pasquale "Pat" Giammarco began operating a restaurant in Oregon, Ohio, a suburb of Toledo.
- Born:
  - Julia Jentsch, German actress, winner of the Best Actress award at the 2005 European Film Awards for Sophie Scholl; in West Berlin, West Germany
  - Lauren Ambrose, American TV actress and winner of two Screen Actors Guild Awards for Six Feet Under; in New Haven, Connecticut
  - Jay Hernandez, American film and TV actor best known for starring as Thomas Magnum in Magnum P.I. from 2018 to 2024, a remake of the Tom Selleck series Magnum, P.I. that ran from 1980 to 1988; in Montebello, California
  - Chelsea Peretti, American actress known for Brooklyn Nine-Nine and screenwriter; in Oakland

== February 21, 1978 (Tuesday) ==
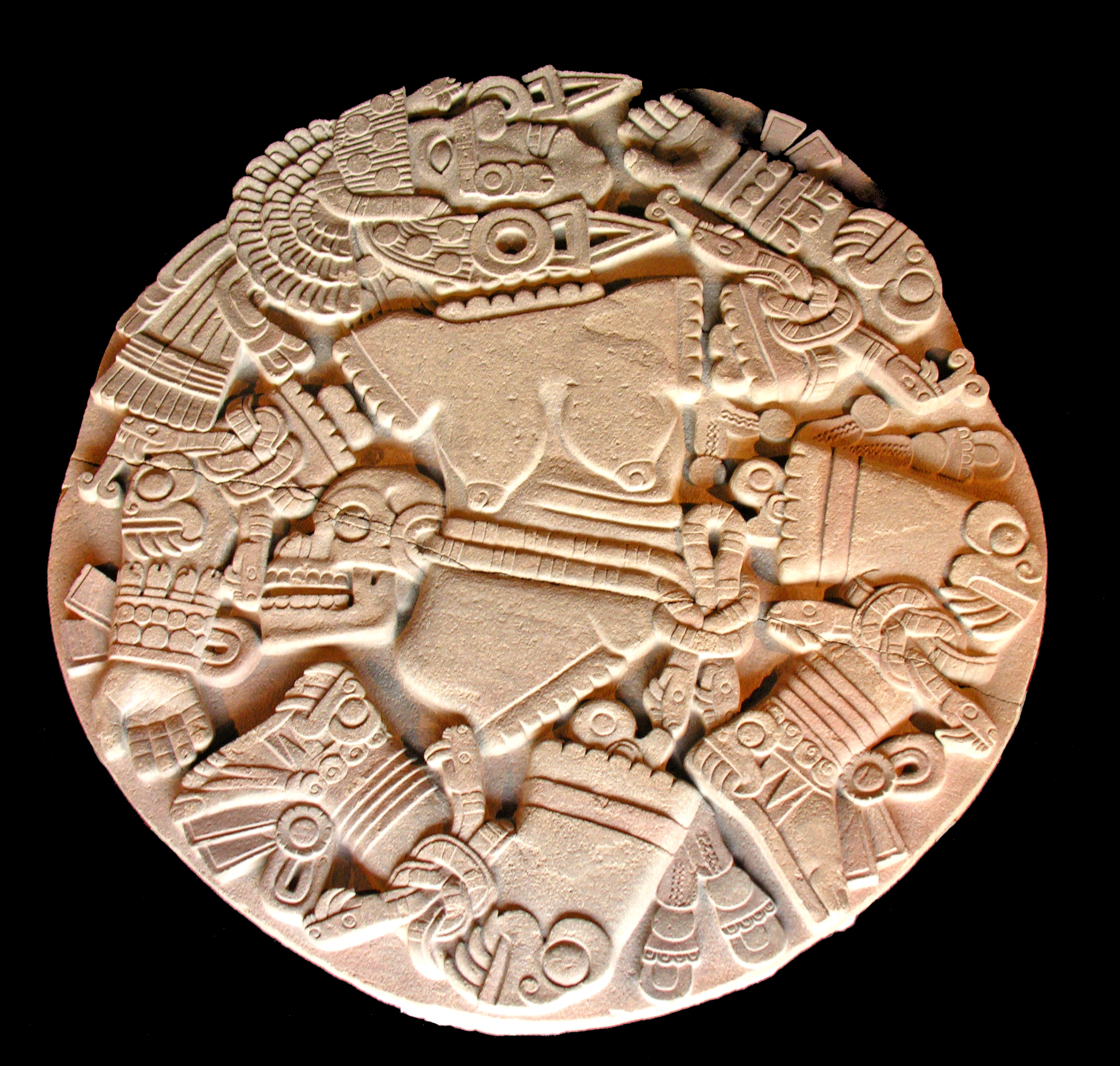
The Coyolxauhqui Stone

- The Coyolxauhqui Stone, an Aztec Empire artifact more than 500 years old, was accidentally discovered by a group of workers who were digging a trench for Mexico City's electrical power company, Comisión Federal de Electricidad (CFE). The find led to the rediscovery of the Templo Mayor, the primary temple in the Aztec capital, Tenochtitlan. At 10.5 feet (3.2 m) in diameter, the stone weighed 19,000 pounds (8,600 kg) and was determined from the inscriptions on it to have been created in the year 1438 during the reign of the Emperor Axayacatl.
- A law went into effect requiring a warning label warning on packages and bottles containing the artificial sweetener saccharin. The warning was implemented in place of a proposed 18-month ban of saccharin.
- Born: Kim Ha-neul, South Korean actress, winner of the 2011 Grand Bell Award for Best Actress for Blind; in Seoul

== February 22, 1978 (Wednesday) ==
- Navstar 1, the first satellite in the Global Positioning System (GPS), was launched into Earth orbit from Vandenberg Air Force Base in California. Liftoff took place at 23:44 UTC (3:44 in the afternoon local time) from Vandenberg Space Launch Complex 3. The Navstar, officially "OPS 5111", was part of "Block I", the first group of 11 GPS satellites.
- The Istiqlal Mosque, with capacity for as many as 120,000 worshipers, was inaugurated in Jakarta by President Suharto as Indonesia's national mosque.
- The U.S. House of Representatives voted, 234 to 182, to cancel $462 million of further funding for the B-1 bomber and to divert the money elsewhere, following up to the U.S. Senate vote to cancel funding for a fifth and sixth B-1.
- Died: Debbie Weems, 28, American singer and actress on stage and TV, best known as a recurring cast member on the children's TV show Captain Kangaroo, jumped or fell from a building in New York City.

== February 23, 1978 (Thursday) ==
- William H. Webster took office as the new Director of the Federal Bureau of Investigation (FBI), replacing Clarence M. Kelley, who had retired on February 15. Webster, who had been a federal judge for the U.S. Court of Appeals for the Eighth Circuit, had been nominated by U.S. President Jimmy Carter and confirmed by the U.S. Senate.
- Died: John Howard, 33, Canadian mountain guide and mountaineer, was killed while climbing the Athabasca Glacier in the Joffre Group of the Lillooet Ranges of British Columbia's Coast Mountains, when he fell into a crevasse. Though climbing with a companion, the two made the journey without being linked by a rope and Howard plunged into the crevasse when a snow bridge collapsed beneath him. The 8,369-foot (2,551 m) high Mount Howard in the Joffre Group was named in his honor on June 11, 1979.

== February 24, 1978 (Friday) ==
- The explosion of a railroad tanker car killed 16 people in Waverly, Tennessee, and injured 43 others. Two days earlier, the freighter hauling the car had derailed on the Louisville & Nashville Railroad line, and a hazardous materials (hazmat) crew of workers was handling the cleanup effort. At 2:58 in the afternoon, as temperatures were warming up from 20 °F (−7 °C) to 60 °F (16 °C) a tanker that had been carrying over 30,000 U.S. gallons of liquefied petroleum gas experienced a boiling liquid expanding vapor explosion (BLEVE).
- U.S. President Carter signed the Endangered American Wilderness Act of 1978 into law, adding 400,000 acres 625 square miles (1,620 km^{2}) of wilderness in four western U.S. states to the National Wilderness Preservation System.
- Fishermen in Japan finished a three-day operation to kill dolphins who were in the waters around Iki Island. Starting on February 22, a fleet of 300 fishing boats converged on a school of dolphins at sea, herded them toward the island shore, dragged them onto the beach and clubbed over 1,000 dolphins to death. A spokesman said that the fishermen had decided on the dolphin massacre because the swimming mammals consumed cuttlefish and hamachi (yellowtail snappers), the two varieties of fish that the fishermen relied upon for most of their income.
- Born:
  - Andrea Di Paolo, Italian classical music composer; in Atessa
  - Gary (stage name for Kang Hee-gun), South Korean rapper and record producer; in Jamsil-dong, Seoul
- Died:
  - Alma Thomas, 86, African-American painter
  - Sam Byrne (Michael Eldridge Samuel), 94, Australian painter
  - Mrs Mills (Gladys Jordan Mills), 59, English pianist and recording artist of sing-along songs

== February 25, 1978 (Saturday) ==
- In Argentina, the collision of a train with a delivery truck killed 55 people at a crossing in Sa Pereira, Santa Fe Province. With 2,130 passengers on board, the Estrella del Norte train was traveling from San Miguel de Tucumán to Buenos Aires. The truck's driver disregarded warning signals in an attempt to cross the tracks before the train arrived.
- Poitín, the first feature film to be made entirely with Irish dialogue, was released. The title referred to poitin, homemade distilled beverage produced by moonshiners.
- The owner of the NHL's Toronto Maple Leafs, Harold Ballard, angry over a new bylaw of the National Hockey League requiring all uniforms to include a player's name, complied with the letter of the law, if not the spirit, by sending out his team with names stitched on their dark blue jerseys used for away games, but with letters of the same dark blue color. "I've complied with the NHL bylaw," Ballard told reporters in Chicago. "The names are stitched on, three inches high. It's a pity you can't see them."
- Born: Yuji Nakazawa, Japanese footballer with 110 caps for the Japan national team; in Yoshikawa, Saitama Prefecture
- Died:
  - U.S. Air Force General Daniel James Jr., 58, the first African American to reach the four-star rank in the U.S. Armed Forces, died of a heart attack only three weeks after his retirement.
  - Edith Humphrey, 102, British inorganic chemist and the first British woman to obtain a doctorate in chemistry
  - Margarete Bieber, 98, the second woman to become a university professor in Germany

== February 26, 1978 (Sunday) ==
- The 5th National People's Congress of the People's Republic of China, with 3,497 delegates, opened its first session for a term that would last for more than five years. Almost 90% of the seats (3,116) were filled by members of the Chinese Communist Party, while another 381 were reserved for eight other organizations approved by the Communists, including the "Taiwan Democratic Self-Government League", the "China Association for Promoting Democracy" and the "China Democratic League".
- Eight motorists were killed and 67 motorists and residents injured near the town of Youngstown, Florida, by chlorine gas from a ruptured railway tank car. The cloud of gas stalled car engines on U.S. Route 231 by cutting off the oxygen needed for combustion. Those remaining in their vehicles died quickly, and others who tried to flee were overcome. The accident arose when 47 freight cars and five locomotives of a Bay Line Railroad train were derailed. The cause of the derailment was laid by National Transportation Safety Board to "sabotage as a result of someone realigning the rails at a joint in the track."
- Elections were held in the West African nation of Senegal for the 100-seat National Assembly and for president. The voting was the first since independence to allow candidates from more than one political party. President Léopold Sédar Senghor of the Parti Socialiste du Sénégal (PS) was re-elected with 82% of the vote, compared to slightly less than 18% for his opponent from the Parti démocratique sénégalais (PDS), Abdoulaye Wade.
- Voting was held in the South American nation of Colombia for the 112-member Senate and the 199-member Chamber of Representatives. The Partido Liberal Colombiano (PLC) won a majority in both chambers, with 62 in the Senate and 111 in the Chamber. The Partido Conservador Colombiano gained seats but remained in the minority. Voting for President would take place on June 4.
- Died:
  - Camilo Ortega, 27, Nicaraguan revolutionary with the Sandinista National Liberation Front, was killed by the Nicaraguan National Guard, whose soldiers had discovered the Sandinista hideout in the Las Sabogales neighborhood of the city of Masaya.
  - Maria Bach, 81, Austrian composer and violinist, died from accidental carbon monoxide poisoning from a defective gas stove.
  - Pooley Hubert, 76, American college football player who later coached both the football and basketball teams at Mississippi State University and the Virginia Military Institute, inductee to the College Football Hall of Fame

== February 27, 1978 (Monday) ==
- The Rhodesian Army crossed into the neighboring nation of Botswana at the border town of Kazungula and encountered members of a unit of the Botswana Defence Force at Lesoma, mistaking them for Zimbabwean nationalists. Fifteen Botswanan soldiers and a civilian were killed and three of its army's vehicles were destroyed in the battle.
- For the first time, South African political prisoners on Robben Island were allowed to receive news. Prison authorities taped the Radio South Africa news service report in the morning and in the afternoon, and then played it over the audio system in the prisoner cells every evening. Newspapers and magazines would not be allowed until 1980.
- Pope Paul VI approved the publication of Normae Congregationis de Modo Procedendi in Diudicandis Praesumptis Apparitionibus as Revelationibus (Norms of the Congregation for Proceeding in Judging Alleged Apparitions and Revelations), written in Latin and intended solely for reading by authorized Roman Catholic bishops.
- The Soviet Union launched the last of its Tsiklon (Cyclone) navigation satellites into orbit, after placing the first one into space in May 1967. With the system in place, the Soviet government allowed the USSR's merchant marine and fishing vessels to use the service.
- Born:
  - Kakhaber Kaladze, Georgian politician and Mayor of Tbilisi since 2017, previously a footballer with 83 caps for the Georgia national team; in Samtredia, Georgian SSR, Soviet Union
  - Adam Kinzinger, U.S. Representative from 2011 to 2023 as a Republican for Illinois, later a political commentator for CNN; in Kankakee, Illinois
- Died: Robert Sobukwe, 53, South African anti-apartheid activist and first president of the Pan Africanist Congress, died of complications of lung cancer.

== February 28, 1978 (Tuesday) ==
- Moussa Traoré, the president of the west African nation of Mali, ordered the arrest of his allies Tiécoro Bagayoko, Director of the National Security Service, along with Kissima Doukara, the Minister of Defense and Internal Security, and Public Works Minister Karim Dembele, who had been plotting a coup d'état. Bagayoko and Doukara were sentenced to the Taoudenni prison camp that they had designed for political prisoners, and worked in the salt mines until being murdered in August 1983.
- Born:
  - Yasir Hameed, Pakistani cricketer with 176 caps for the Pakistan national team in Test cricket and 147 caps in One Day International Play; in Peshawar
  - Benjamin Raich, Austrian alpine skier and winner of two Olympic gold medals in 2006 in the slalom and giant slalom, and three world championships; in Arzl im Pitztal
- Died:
  - Philip Ahn, 72, Asian-American character actor of Korean descent
  - Zara Cully, 86, African-American stage, film and TV actress best known for being the elderly mother on The Jeffersons
