= Musik und Gesellschaft =

German music magazine

Musik und Gesellschaft was a music magazine in the German Democratic Republic. It was published monthly from 1951 to 1990 in East Berlin by Henschelverlag.

== History ==
The journal was published from the first issue in March 1951 onwards by Ernst Hermann Meyer and the Staatliche Kommission für Kunstangelegenheiten. In 1954 the editorship changed to the Verband der Komponisten und Musikwissenschaftler der DDR, of which it simultaneously became the official organ of communication. The music magazine regularly awarded a recording prize.

== Chief editors ==
- 1951–1952 Karl Laux
- 1952–1959 Eberhard Rebling.
- 1959–1960 Horst Seeger.
- 1960–1973 Hansjürgen Schaefer
- 1973–1990 Liesel Markowski

== Literature ==
- Bettina Hinterthür: Noten nach Plan. Die Musikverlage in der SBZ, DDR – Zensursystem, zentrale Planwirtschaft und deutsch-deutsche Beziehungen bis Anfang der 1960er Jahre. Franz Steiner Verlag, Stuttgart 2006, ISBN 3-515-08837-7.
