= Horst Seeger =

German music critic, intendant and writer (1926-1999)

Horst Seeger (6 November 1926 – 2 January 1999), pseudonyme Horst Schell, was a German musicologist, music critic, dramaturg, librettist and opera director.

== Leben ==
Born in Erkner in the Province of Brandenburg, Seeger studied musicology at the Humboldt University of Berlin with Walter Vetter, Ernst Hermann Meyer and Hans-Heinz Dräger and worked as a music journalist and critic from 1954. From 1959 to 1960 he was editor-in-chief of the journal Musik und Gesellschaft. From 1960-1973 he was chief dramaturge at the Komische Oper Berlin. In 1973 he took over the direction of the Staatsoper Dresden in the building of the Schauspielhaus and since 1979 also the direction of the Staatstheater Dresden. Seeger brought directors like Harry Kupfer and Ruth Berghaus and conductors like Herbert Blomstedt to Dresden. He rendered great services to the reconstruction of the Semperoper.

Seeger died in Dresden at age 72.

== Writings ==
=== Books ===
- Wolfgang Amadeus Mozart. VEB Deutscher Verlag für Musik, Leipzig 1956.
- Kleines Musiklexikon. Henschelverlag, Berlin 1958.
- Biografische Nachrichten von Joseph Haydn. Bärenreiter-Verlag, Kassel 1964.
- Musiklexikon in zwei Bänden. VEB Deutscher Verlag für Musik, Leipzig 1966.
- Wir und die Musik. Henschelverlag Kunst und Gesellschaft, Berlin 1968.
- with U. Bökel: Wie stark ist nicht dein Zauberton. Kinderbuchverlag Berlin, Berlin 1974.
- Opern-Lexikon. 3rd, extended new edition (licensed edition from Henschelverlag Kunst und Gesellschaft, Berlin. - Edition for the Federal Republic of Germany, Berlin (West), Austria and Switzerland), Heinrichshofen-Bücher. Florian Noetzel Verlage, Wilhelmshaven 1987, ISBN 3-7959-0271-1.
- Musiklexikon in zwei Bänden. VEB Deutscher Verlag für Musik, Leipzig 1966.
- Die große Liedertruhe. Verlag Faber&Faber, Leipzig 1997.

=== Libretti ===
- Lazarillo vom Tormes, opera by Siegfried Matthus, Henschelverlag Kunst und Gesellschaft, Berlin 1964
- Der Doppelgänger, ballet by Fritz Geißler
- Barockkonzert, by Günther Fischer
- 1963: Ritter Blaubart with Walter Felsenstein after the original by Henri Meilhac and Ludovic Halévy
- 1966: Don Giovanni with Walter Felsenstein after the original by Lorenzo Da Ponte

== Literature ==
- Siegfried Matthus: Nimmermüde, opernbesessen – Zum Tod von Horst Seeger. In Berliner Zeitung, 5 January 1999; (obituary)
