= Hans-Joachim Spremberg =

East German news photographer

- Born: 8 December 1943; Berlin, Germany
- Died: 6 March 1978; Wadi Suf al-Jin, Libya
- Occupation: News photographer
- Political party: SED

Hans-Joachim Spremberg (8 December 1943 – 6 March 1978) was an East German news photographer with the state news agency. His photographs documented high-profile state occasions along with daily life in East Berlin. He died as the result of a helicopter accident while on an assignment in Libya.

Sources attributing his work sometimes identify him simply as Joachim Spremberg.

== Life ==
Joachim Spremberg was born in Berlin late in 1943. After leaving school he trained as a film copying technician, a preparation to becoming a photo-journalist. He started work with the Pictures Department of the state news agency (Allgemeiner Deutscher Nachrichtendienst / ADN) in 1964. Here he quickly and single-mindedly started photo-reporting significant events. Along with daily life he documented the construction of the Berlin Television Tower and was frequently employed at important national events, including some involving the national leader, Walter Ulbricht.

Spremberg joined the country's ruling Socialist Unity Party of Germany (Sozialistische Einheitspartei Deutschlands / SED) in 1969. His reporting career earned him awards that included the East German Medal of Merit (Verdienstmedaille), the Banner of Labor and the Distinguished Service Medal of the National People's Army.

In March 1978 Spremberg accompanied the media-savvy politician Werner Lamberz on a visit to Libya where Lamberz was scheduled to negotiate a complex trade and investment deal with that country's leader. Early in March 1978, the final meeting between Lamberz and Gaddafi took place in a large tented encampment set up by the latter in the Libyan desert. At 21.30 on 6 March 1978, shortly after taking off en route back from the tented encampment at Wadi Suf al-Jin (Wādī Sawfajjīn), the Super Frelon helicopter carrying the four-member East German delegation fell into a tailspin and crashed. None of the four survived. Those who died along with Werner Lamberz were the Central Committee International Relations chief, Paul Markowski, the translator Armin Ernst and the news-photographer Hans-Joachim Spremberg. It was later reported that Lamberz's Libyan negotiating partners had urged him to stay an extra night and not to risk traveling in a helicopter with a Libyan pilot who was known to have no experience of night flying. The formal agreement between the two countries on the training of military personnel came into effect only twelve months later. The leadership in Libya did not permit any external investigation of what happened, but according to the Libyan accident report the helicopter reached an altitude of about 30 meters, and then attempted to move off to the left, but instead fell like a stone to the ground and exploded. The official Libyan report imputed all the blame for the accident to the pilot. Subsequent conspiracy theories have circled the events ever since, but none of these has progressed beyond a series of tantalising conjectural scenarios.

== Gallery ==
Some Hans-Joachim Spremberg photographs transferred from the old East German ADN (news agency) archive to the German Federal Archives and published on the internet by them:

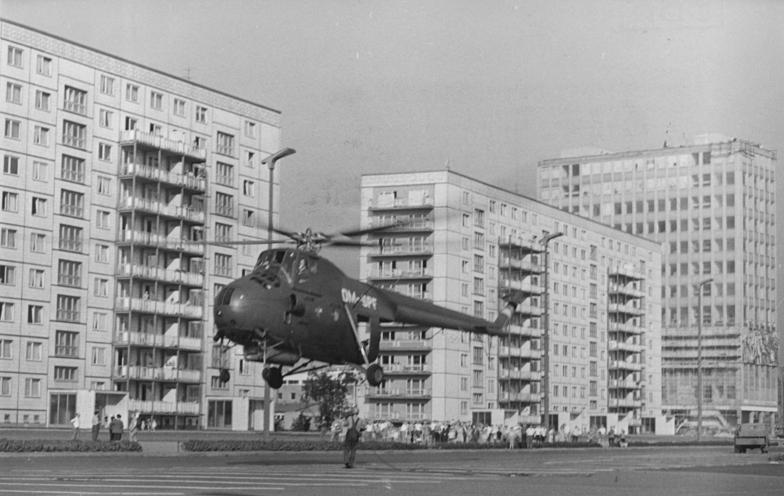
1964:Helicopter used in a Berlin building project

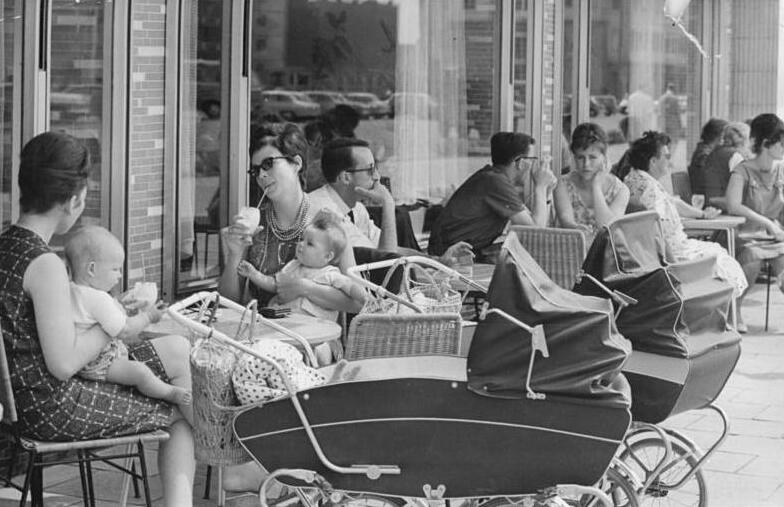
1964: Coffee-Milk-Ice Bar in Berlin's Karl-Marx-Allee

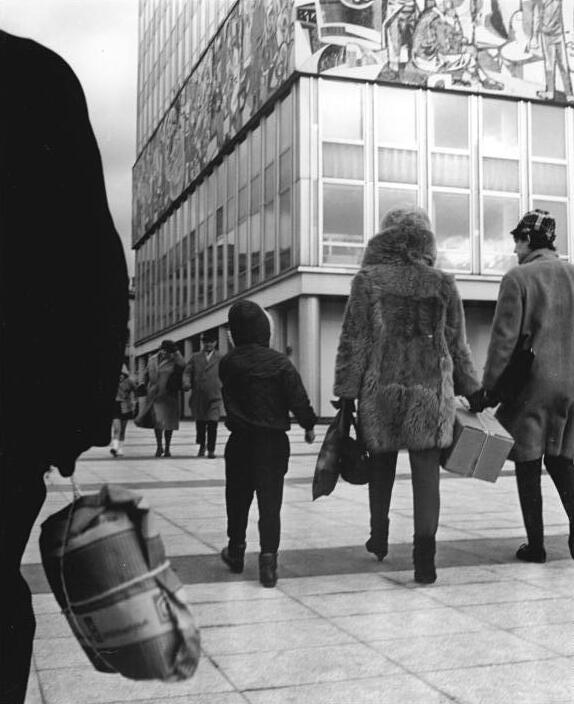
1965: Passers-by at the Berlin Teachers' Association Building

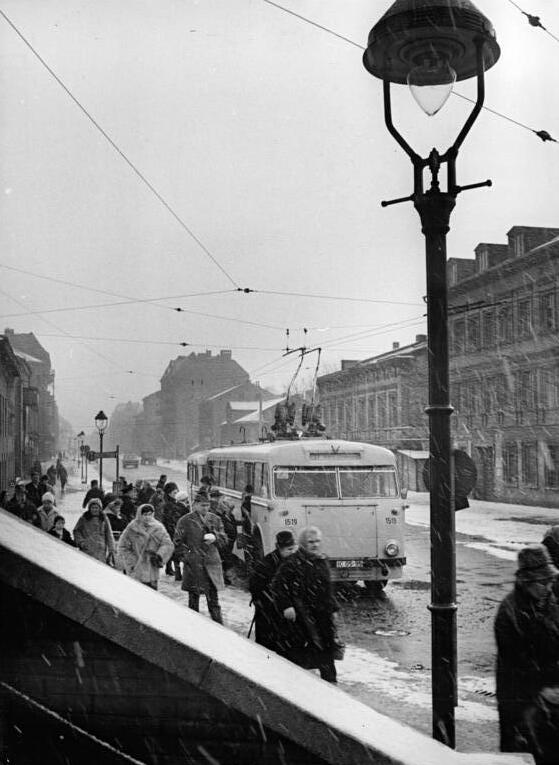
1965: Berlin-Lichtenberg station in winter
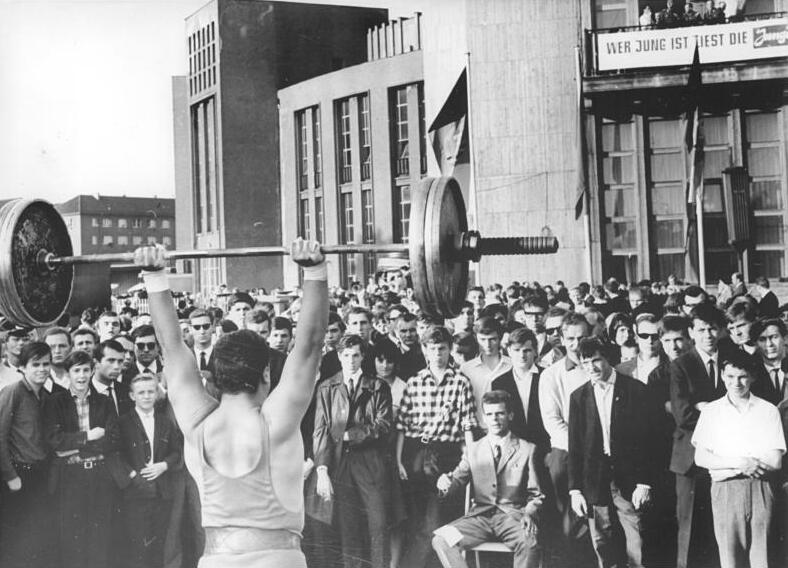
1966: Weightlifting-Demonstration at the European Championships in the GDR

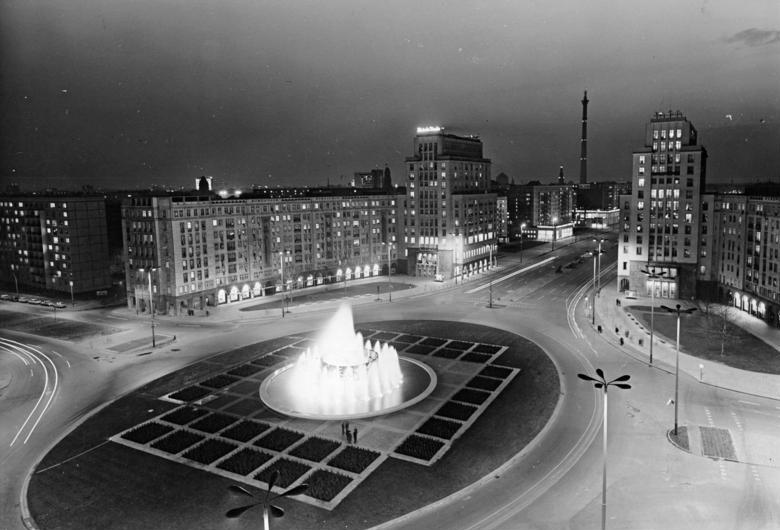
1967: Strausberger Platz (Berlin) by night

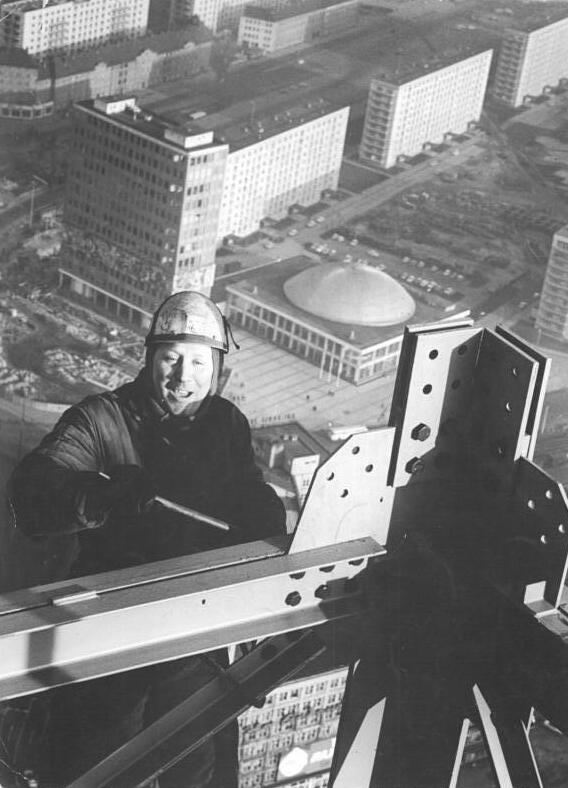
1967: Berlin Television Tower under construction

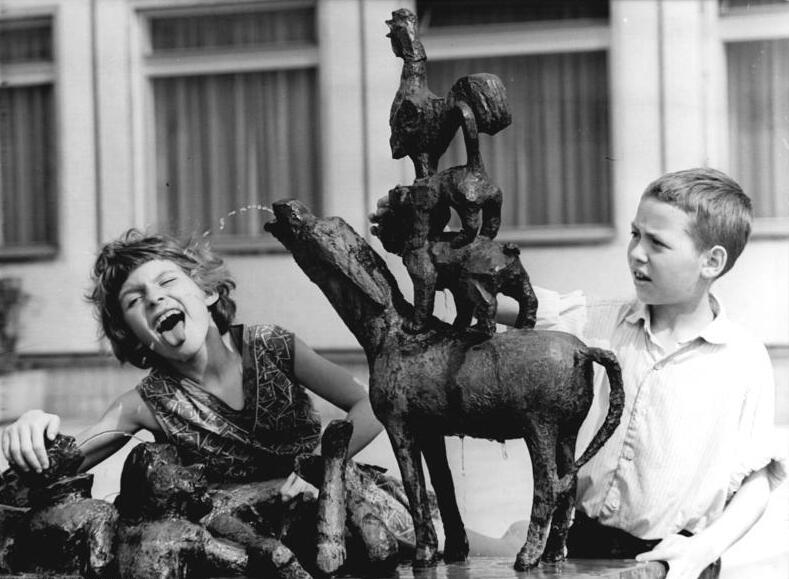
31967: Children in Berlin's Hans-Loch Quarter, (a high-profile post-war reconstruction project)
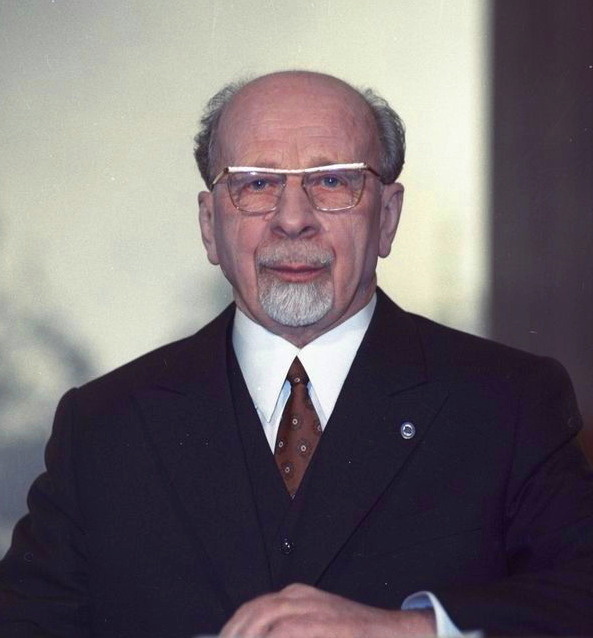
1970: Walter Ulbricht's New Year's Speech

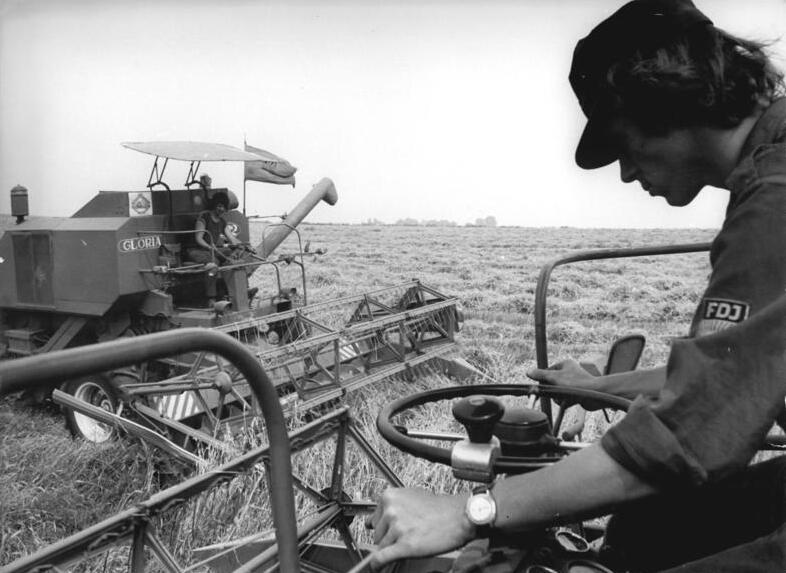
1973: Harvest in the GDR

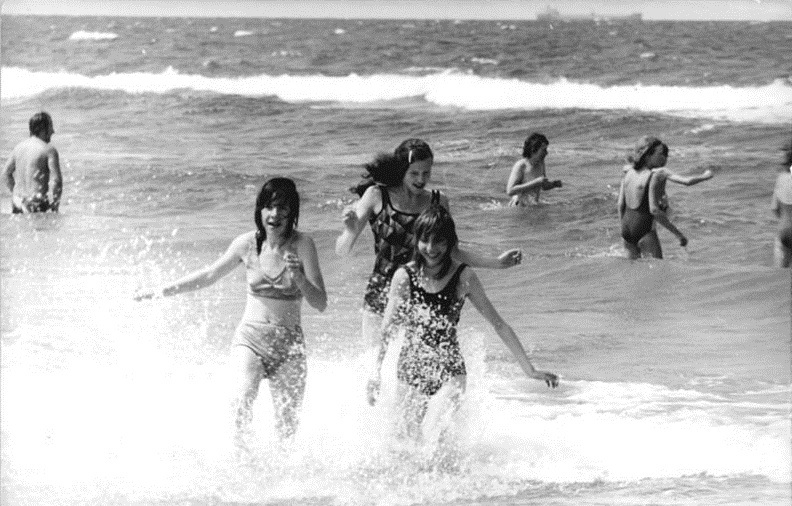
1975: Girls bathing in the Baltic Sea

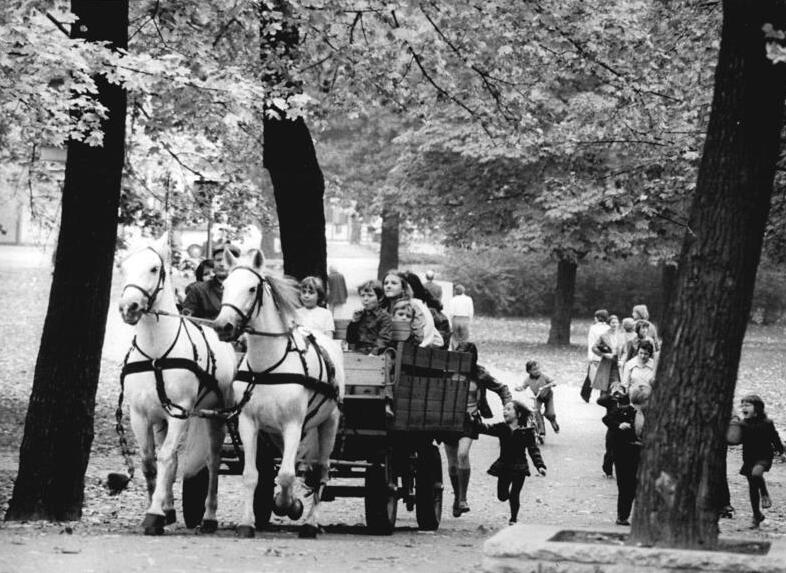
1976: Children on a "carriage ride" in the Friedrichshain public park (Berlin)
