= Paul Markowski (politician) =

East German politician

Head of the International Relations Department of the Central Committee
- In office 1966 – 6 March 1978
- Secretary: Hermann Axen
- Deputy: Rudi Guttmann; Harry Ott; Egon Winkelmann; Gerd König
- Preceded by: Peter Florin
- Succeeded by: Egon Winkelmann
Volkskammer
Member of the Volkskammer for Berlin
In office 29 November 1971 – 6 March 1978
Appointed by	Magistrate of East Berlin
Succeeded by	Egon Winkelmann

Personal details
- Born: 1 June 1929 Magdeburg, Province of Saxony, Free State of Prussia, Weimar Republic (now Saxony-Anhalt, Germany)
- Died: 6 March 1978 (aged 48) Wadi Suf al-Jin, Libya
- Party: Socialist Unity Party (1950–1978)
- Spouse: Liesel Carow (m. 1955; died 1978)
- Education: Deutsche Akademie für Staats- und Rechtswissenschaft (DASR) „Walter Ulbricht“ (Dipl.-Staatswiss.); CPSU Higher Party School "W. I. Lenin"
- Occupation: Politician; Party Functionary; Machinist
- Awards: Patriotic Order of Merit; Banner of Labor
- Central institution membership: 1971–1978: Full member, Central Committee; 1967–1971: Candidate member, Central Committee; Other offices held: 1964–1966: Deputy Head, International Relations Department of the Central Committee

Paul Markowski (1 June 1929 – 6 March 1978) was an East German politician. He became a member of the country's powerful Party Central Committee in 1971, at the unusually young age of 43. He was also unusually talented as a linguist. A promising career was cut short, however, when he died as the result of a desert helicopter accident while accompanying Werner Lamberz on a trade mission to Libya.

== Life ==
Paul Markowski, the son of a Kashubian industrial worker who had relocated from Danzig, was born in Magdeburg. His father had taken part in the 1918 Kiel mutiny and in the subsequent revolutionary events in Berlin. Markowski attended school locally between 1935 and 1940. He joined a youth sports group in 1939 and the Hitler Youth organisation in 1940. His school career was interrupted by the war: by the time he completed his schooling, between 1946 and 1948, the war had ended with a large part of what had been central Germany - including Magdeburg - administered as the Soviet occupation zone. Passing his school leaving exams (Abitur) opened the way to university level education, and in 1948 he moved on to the University of Rostock, some way to the north of Magdeburg. Here he studied modern languages (English, French, and Russian).

In October 1949, following that year's Berlin siege, the Soviet occupation zone was relaunched as the Soviet sponsored German Democratic Republic (East Germany), a new kind of German one-party dictatorship with many of its political and economic structures closely modeled on those of the Soviet Union itself. Markowski joined the Free German Youth ("Freie Deutsche Jugend" / FDJ), effectively the youth wing of the recently created Socialist Unity Party ("Socialist Unity Party of Germany" / SED) which by this stage was increasingly firmly ensconced as the ruling party. 1949 was also the year in which he joined the Free German Trade Union Federation ("Freier Deutsche Gewerkschaftsbund " / FDGB) and the Society for German–Soviet Friendship ("Gesellschaft für Deutsch-Sowjetische Freundschaft" / DSF). In 1950 he attended a specialist training in simultaneous translation at the regional FDJ academy in Bärenklau (Velten) in preparation for the FDJ's "Third international World Youth Festival", which in 1951 was hosted by East Berlin. He joined the SED (party) itself only in 1952. By this time he had added Spanish to his repertoire of foreign languages.

Between 1950 and 1951 he is listed as an instructor with the National Council of the FDJ. From October 1950 he furthered his studies in Berlin, at the Humboldt University, now focusing on Slavistic studies. Between 1951 and 1953 he studied foreign policy at the "Walter Ulbricht" College of Administration at Babelsberg (Potsdam) and diplomacy-statecraft at the closely associated German academy for Government and Jurisprudence.

After this Markowski embarked on a career in the extensive bureaucratic apparatus of the Party Central Committee, between 1953 and 1956 as an instructor in the Department for Foreign Policy and International Relations (Capitalist states) and between 1956 and 1964 as a section head in the same department. It was during this period, in 1955, that he married Liesel Carow who has subsequently achieved notability as a musicologist. They had originally got to know one another several years earlier as language students in Berlin. The marriage seems to have been a good one: more than half a century later, in an interview, the widow Liesel Markowski would warmly endorse a fellow student's admiring description of the young Paul Makowski back in the early 1950s as "the smallest, the poorest and the best" ("der Kleinste, der Ärmste und der Beste").

Along with his other responsibilities, in 1960 Paul Markowski became head of the "Struggle against Colonialism" working group. The path to further promotion opened up in 1961/62 when he was sent to Moscow and spent a year as a student at the Communist Party Academy. On his return he initially resumed his work with the "Struggle against Colonialism" working group. Then in February 1964 he was appointed deputy head of the Party Central Committee's Department for International Relations, taking overall charge of the department, in succession to Peter Florin, in 1966. In April 1967, at the seventh party conference of the SED, he became one of 50 candidates for membership of the Party Central Committee. Four years later, in 1971, he became one of 135 full Central Committee members. Within the Central Committee he also became, in July 1971, a member of the Politburo Foreign Policy Commission. Under the Leninist constitutional structure in operation, executive power in East Germany was concentrated not in any parliament, nor in the hands of government ministers but in the Party Central Committee. The starkness of the hierarchy was to some extent concealed, given that Central Committee members were frequently also government ministers and / or members of the legislature. Paul Markowski sat as an SED member of the National Parliament (Volkskammer) representing the Berlin electoral district between 1971 and his death in 1978.

== Death ==
In March 1978 Markowski accompanied the media-savvy politician Werner Lamberz as part of a small delegation to Libya in order to negotiate a complex trade and investment deal with that country's leader. Early in March 1978, the final meeting with Gaddafi took place in a large tented encampment set up by the latter in the Libyan desert. At 21.30 on 6 March 1978, shortly after taking off en route back from the tented encampment at Wadi Suf al-Jin (Wādī Sawfajjīn), the Super Frelon helicopter carrying the four-member East German delegation fell into a tailspin and crashed. None of the four survived. Those who died along with Werner Lamberz were Paul Markowski, the translator Armin Ernst and the news-photographer Hans-Joachim Spremberg. It was later reported that their Libyan negotiating partners had urged them to stay an extra night and not to risk traveling in a helicopter with a Libyan pilot who was known to have no experience of night flying. The formal agreement between the two countries on the training of military personnel came into effect only twelve months later. The leadership in Libya did not permit any external investigation of what happened, but according to the Libyan accident report the helicopter reached an altitude of about 30 meters, and then attempted to move off to the left, but instead fell like a stone to the ground and exploded. The official Libyan report imputed all the blame for the accident to the pilot. Subsequent conspiracy theories have circled the events ever since, but none of these has progressed beyond a series of tantalising conjectural scenarios.

== Awards and honours ==
- 1965 Patriotic Order of Merit
- 1969 Banner of Labor
- 1973 Patriotic Order of Merit

In Magdeburg, a short distance to the north of the city centre, "Paul-Markowski-Platz" ("Paul Markowski Square") was named after him, but has subsequently been renamed "Neustädter Platz".
