= Werner Lamberz =

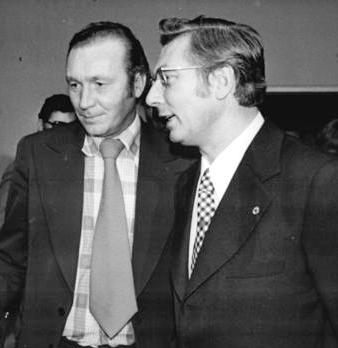
- Lamberz (right) in 1975

Secretary for Agitation of the Central Committee Secretariat
- In office 22 April 1967 – 6 March 1978
- General Secretary: Walter Ulbricht; Erich Honecker
- Preceded by: Albert Norden
- Succeeded by: Joachim Herrmann

Head of the Agitation Department
- In office 15 September 1966 – 19 June 1971
- Secretary: Albert Norden; himself
- Deputy: Eberhard Fensch; Günter Fischer; Frank-Joachim Herrmann; Hans-Joachim Kobert; Herbert Malcherek
- Preceded by: Rudi Singer
- Succeeded by: Hans Modrow

Head of the Foreign Information Working Group
- In office 27 March 1963 – 17 September 1966
- Secretary: Albert Norden
- Deputy: Ernst-Otto Schwabe
- Preceded by: Position established
- Succeeded by: Manfred Feist
Parliamentary constituencies
Member of the Volkskammer for Frankfurt/Oder, Beeskow, Eisenhüttenstadt-Stadt, Eisenhüttenstadt-Land, Seelow
In office 14 July 1967 – 6 March 1978
Preceded by	multi-member district
Succeeded by	Lothar Burkhardt

Personal details
- Born: 14 April 1929 Mayen, Rhine Province, Free State of Prussia, Weimar Republic (now Rhineland-Palatinate, Germany)
- Died: 6 March 1978 (aged 48) Wadi Suf al-Jin, Libya
- Party: Socialist Unity Party (1947–1978)
- Children: 1
- Education: Central Komsomol School
- Occupation: Politician; Heating Engineer
- Awards: Patriotic Order of Merit; Banner of Labor
- Central institution membership: 1971–1978: Full member, Politburo of the Central Committee; 1970–1971: Candidate member, Politburo of the Central Committee; 1967–1978: Full member, Central Committee; 1963–1967: Candidate member, Central Committee; Other offices held: 1966–1971: Head, Commission for Agitation and Propaganda; 1963–1978: Member, Commission for Agitation and Propaganda

Werner Lamberz (14 April 1929 – 6 March 1978) was a senior politician in the German Democratic Republic (East Germany).

In a system under which political advancement was generally achieved only slowly and the men who reached the higher levels of government generally did so after decades of patient progression, Lamberz was unusual because of the speed of his promotion. Despite having spent three years during the 1940s attending an Adolf Hitler Leadership School, during 1967 he became a member of the important Central Committee of the ruling party, aged around 38, and after only four years on the candidate list. During the 1970s he was sometimes seen as a possible successor to his political ally, the country's leader Erich Honecker.

Werner Lamberz was killed in a helicopter accident in Libya shortly after take-off, following a meeting in a large desert encampment with the Libyan head of government, Muammar Gaddafi. The cause of the accident in which Lamberz and his three fellow travelers lost their lives has been a subject for media speculation ever since it happened.

== Life ==
=== Early life and Nazi years ===
Werner Lamberz was born in Mayen in the Eifel region, approximately 36 kim (22 miles) to the west of Koblenz. His father, Peter Lamberz, was a building worker and local leader ("Politleiter") in the (since 1933 illegal) Communist Party. The son became a member of the German Youth organisation, a junior version of the Hitler Youth movement, between 1939 and 1943. One of his contemporaries in the Mayen youth group was the future actor, Mario Adorf, who got to know the family well, being particularly keen on Werner's sister, Liane. Werner Lamberz switched to the Hitler Youth in 1943,

In 1941 he was removed from the local school in Mayen and sent away to boarding school at the Ordensburg Sonthofen, an elite special school for those identified as future leaders of Nazi Germany. His mother had been urged both by local party officials and by her own respectable relatives locally to go along with this step in order protect her children, Werner and Liane, from being influenced by his father, the known communist "public enemy" ("Volksfeinde"), Peter Lamberz. Peter Lamberz had been one of the first citizens of Mayen to find himself in "Protective custody" ("Schutzhaft") when the Nazis had come to power early in 1933, but had been released, subject to ongoing surveillance. Mario Adorf encountered Peter Lamberz on his first visit to the two bedroom apartment where the family lived in Mayen's Koblenzer Straße and later recalled, "The father looked in a bad way. He was pale and coughing. One knew he had been in the [concentration] camp, but you were not allowed to talk about it". Werner Lamberz attended the elite boarding school at Sonthofen till 1944.

=== Soviet occupation zone and German Democratic Republic ===
The final months of the war found him helping to keep his father hidden in the Mayen area, also undertaking some work for a nursery garden and for a building company. War ended in defeat for Germany, formally in May 1945, shortly after Werner Lamberz celebrated his sixteenth birthday. Germany was divided by her wartime enemies into military occupation zones. Mayen would end up under French military control. Werner Lamberz undertook an apprenticeship as a heating engineer and installer in the Mayen area. At the beginning of 1946 his mother died and he moved to join his father, who had himself relocated to Luckenwalde, in the Soviet occupation zone as soon as the war ended, In Luckenwalde Lamberz continued to work as a heating engineer. In 1947, now aged 18, he joined the Free German Youth (Freie Deutsche Jugend/ FDJ), which was becoming the national youth movement of the Soviet administered part of Germany. Despite the deep mutual hatred between proponents of the Nazism with which he had grown up in Germany and of the Communism advocated by the Soviet occupier, the education that Werner Lamberz had received in a school for future Nazi leaders evidently provided appropriate training for a leadership role within the ostensibly Communist FDJ organisation. In 1947 Lamberz also joined the newly created Socialist Unity Party of Germany (Sozialistische Einheitspartei Deutschlands/ SED) which would become the ruling party of a second German one-party dictatorship after the Soviet occupation zone was relaunched, formally in October 1949, as the German Democratic Republic (East Germany). Werner Lamberz achieved a series of rapid promotions within the local party hierarchy till 1949, when he took on equivalent responsibilities in respect of the occupied state of Brandenburg. Party organisation in Brandenburg remained the focus of his employment till 1952.

Between January and July 1950 he attended a study course at the regional party academy at Schmerwitz, after which he was employed as an assistant at the academy till March 1951. Further political education came with a period from August 1952 till August 1953 at the Komsomol (Young Communist League) Academy in Moscow. During the 1950s he held a succession of senior positions in the permanent staff of the FDJ. Between 1953 and 1963 he was successively a member and party secretary for its central council, then its Agitation and Propaganda ("Agitprop") Secretary, and then its Culture Secretary. Between 1955 and 1959 he also served as the FDJ's permanent representative from East Germany to the Central Council of the Budapest based World Federation of Democratic Youth, with which he would retain links throughout his subsequent career. A significant aspect of Werner Lamberz's long career as an official with the FDJ was the close relationship it enabled him to form and sustain with the organisation's founder and constant supporter, the country's future leader, Erich Honecker, who himself headed up the FDJ's central council till 1955.

Lamberz was listed as one of twelve membership candidates for the powerful Party Central Committee in January 1963, and in 1967, still not yet 40, he became one of its 131 members. Between 1963 and 1966 he served under Albert Norden on the Central Committee's Agitation and Propaganda Commission, with special responsibility for Foreign propaganda. It was sometimes claimed that Lamberz was able to speak more than twelve languages, and his fluency in Russian and French is particularly well attested. 1967 was the year in which he became the Central Committee's Agitation Secretary, which effectively placed him immediately in the ranks of the body's "top management". Additionally in 1967, the year of his admission to the Central Committee, a seat was found for Werner Lamberz in the "Volkskammer" ("People's Chamber"), officially the national legislature of the German Democratic Republic. He was also, in 1967, a member of the Electoral Commission which supervised the country's singular electoral processes.

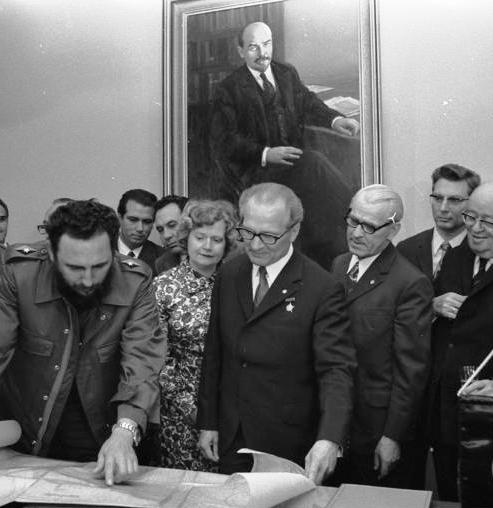
A number of the evidently "staged" photographs of the East German leader Erich Honecker in the 1970s feature Werner Lamberz, sitting or (as here ) standing one or two rows, close behind the leader. This picture, taken on the occasion of a high profile state visit by Fidel Castro, shows the Cuban and East German leaders studying a map of Cuba while Friedrich Ebert and Werner Lamberz look on supportively. Because there is a wall behind the people it has even been possible, here, to top off the entire composition with a portrait of Lenin. June 1972

He became a candidate for Politburo membership in 1970 and a Politburo member just eight months later, in 1971, the appointment being announced at the Eighth Party Conference in June 1971. The 1971 Party Conference was significant for another reason: Walter Ulbricht had finally been persuaded out of most of his offices a couple of months earlier and, with the encouragement of General Secretary Brezhnev, June 1971 marked the dawn of the Honecker era. It was no coincidence that Werner Lamberz was drawn into the Politburo in the slipstream of the newly elevated Party Secretary. It appears to have been Werner Lamberz, applying his skills as a propagandist and backed with powerful support from the Soviet Union, who choreographed the fall of Walter Ulbricht in 1971, and Ulbricht, for one, knew it. Leonid Maltsev and Yuri Bassistov secretly escorted Lamberz to Moscow for a discussion with Brezhnev in late April 1971, which led to Ulbricht stepping down a few days later.

Because he was the leader of the Central Committee's agitation department, the responsibilities of Werner Lamberz included keeping the domestic press in line. The nation's news editors were required to attend weekly "Discussion Debates" ("Argumentationssitzungen") at the party headquarters. Sometimes the precise wording of headlines and the formulation of texts was provided at these meeting. Lamberz was a "hands-on" propaganda chief, prone to telephoning editors individually late at night to give final instructions or to berate one of them savagely in respect of a minor oversight. If a television show failed to include a required camera shot, it was not unknown for the programme producer to find one of his cameras had been re-allocated to another studio.

The Agitprop job also included handling the foreign news media, and here a contrasting approach was noticed, both in respect of domestic news providers, and when the easy social skills of Werner Lamberz were compared with those of other East German politicians. The West German diplomat-journalist Günter Gaus recalled the persuasive volubility of the Central Committee Secretary at social functions, cocktail glass in hand, switching back and forth between French and Russian. Western journalists, who sometimes felt themselves excluded from sources of information, could find an unexpected ally in the Agitprop Secretary. In 1976, at the opening ceremony for the People's Palace in Berlin, the party opinion former told one stunned newsman from the west that he only had to telephone ("einfach anrufen"), if "one of those Foreign Ministry bureaucrats failed to come up with the goods" ("...den Bürokraten im Außenministerium etwas nicht klappt").

With Werner Lamberz in charge of "agitation and propaganda", an East German "media elite" grew up which in some ways resembled developments in western Europe and North America more closely than anything to be found in other central European countries sponsored from Moscow. However, in the East German system developed under Lamberz the dependence of the media elite on the political elite was more overt than it generally became in the west. Attractive movie actresses and television presenters could be sure that sooner or later they would catch the eye of the media-savvy young Agitprop Secretary. The parties held by Lamberz presented a style and polish not normally associated with the social lives, in public, of senior members of the East German government. Although Lamberz evidently enjoyed the opportunities to socialize with attractive women, he was nevertheless clear that these functions also served the important political purpose of providing support for the regime from a flattered and contented media class.

=== Death in Libya ===
During the 1970s governments from various parts of Europe sought to cultivate relations with the leadership in Libya: both German states participated with enthusiasm. For East Germany, Libya offered an attractive market for the country's heavy industrial and armaments sectors, along with the possibility of investment of Libyan petro-dollars at a time when the country was desperately short of convertible currency. The Libyan leader at the time feared a military attack from Egypt and was particularly concerned over the potential military imbalance between Libya, with a population of slightly more than 2 million people, and Egypt, then with a population of around 40 million. East Germany's military and manufacturing expertise and support were attractive to Libya, as was the chance to develop a political relationship with a still trusted ally of the Soviet Union. Negotiations with such a potentially important trading and investment partner would under most circumstances have been handled by Hermann Axen, the senior Politburo member who was the architect of East German foreign policy during the 1960s and 1970s, but Axen was Jewish which made him an inappropriate negotiator to represent a government hoping to make progress with Muammar al-Gaddafi. Secret negotiations were instead headed up, from the East German side, by Erich Honecker's trusted lieutenant, Werner Lamberz. Early in March 1978, the final meeting between Lamberz and Gaddafi took place in a large tented encampment set up by the latter in the Libyan desert. Matters discussed included finalisation of major trade credits and exports deals negotiated substantively during Lamberz's previous visit, three months earlier. Additionally there was discussion concerning the proposed secret provision of Libyan credit to finance high-tech exports by East Germany to third countries. However, Lamberz died on the evening of their last encounter, and these aspects were not all implemented.

At 21.30 on 6 March 1978, shortly after taking off en route back from the tented encampment at Wadi Suf al-Jin (Wādī Sawfajjīn), the Super Frelon helicopter carrying Lamberz and three other members of the East German delegation fell into a tailspin and crashed. On board were six other passengers, including Libyan Minister of Transport Taha el sherif ben Amer. None survived. The Germans who died along with Werner Lamberz were the Central Committee International Relations chief, Paul Markowski, the translator Armin Ernst and the news-photographer Hans-Joachim Spremberg, the man who took the photograph of Lamberz with Frank Beyer appearing at the top of this piece (2015). It was later reported that Lamberz's Libyan negotiating partners had urged him to stay an extra night and not to risk traveling in a helicopter with a Libyan pilot who was known to have no experience of night flying. The formal agreement between the two countries on the training of military personnel came into effect only twelve months later. The leadership in Libya did not permit any external investigation of what happened, but according to the Libyan accident report the helicopter reached an altitude of about 30 meters, and then attempted to move off to the left, but instead fell like a stone to the ground and exploded. The official Libyan report imputed all the blame for the accident to the pilot. Subsequent conspiracy theories have circled the events ever since, but none of these has progressed beyond a series of tantalising conjectural scenarios.

Bodies of the German victims of the accident were subjected to autopsies at the Charité (university hospital) in Berlin. The corpses should have included that of Werner Lamberz, but one of the pathologists involved, Wolfgang Keil, stated in a later interview that it had not been possible to find the remains of Lamberz. Nevertheless, Werner Lamberz received a state funeral and an urn believed to contain his ashes following cremation was placed beside the remains of other privileged East German politicians in the cemetery at Berlin-Lichtenberg.

== Awards and honours ==
- 1964: Patriotic Order of Merit in bronze
- 1968: Banner of Labor
- 1968: Patriotic Order of Merit in gold

The list is not exhaustive. Streets were also named after Werner Lamberz, although they tended to be renamed after the East German state became discredited following German reunification in 1990.
