= Hansjürgen Schaefer =

German musicologist and music critic (1930–1999)

Hansjürgen Schaefer (1930 – 1999) was a German musicologist and music critic.

== Life ==
Born in Freiberg, Schaefer studied music in Leipzig from 1952 to 1954 and musicology in Berlin from 1954 to 1957. From 1957 to 1960, he was editor of the Berliner Zeitung. From 1960 to 1973, he was editor-in-chief of the magazine Musik und Gesellschaft. From 1973 to 1991, he was the artistic director of the VEB Deutsche Schallplatten.

== Publications ==
- Musik in der sozialistischen Gesellschaft. (1967)
- Johann Sebastian Bach : 1685-1750. (1984)
- Orchestermusik. (1987)
- Johannes Brahms : ein Führer durch Leben und Werk. (1997)
- Joseph Haydn : Leben und Werk : ein Konzertbuch. (2000)
