= Mount Howard (British Columbia) =

Mountain summit in the Coast Mountains of British Columbia, Canada

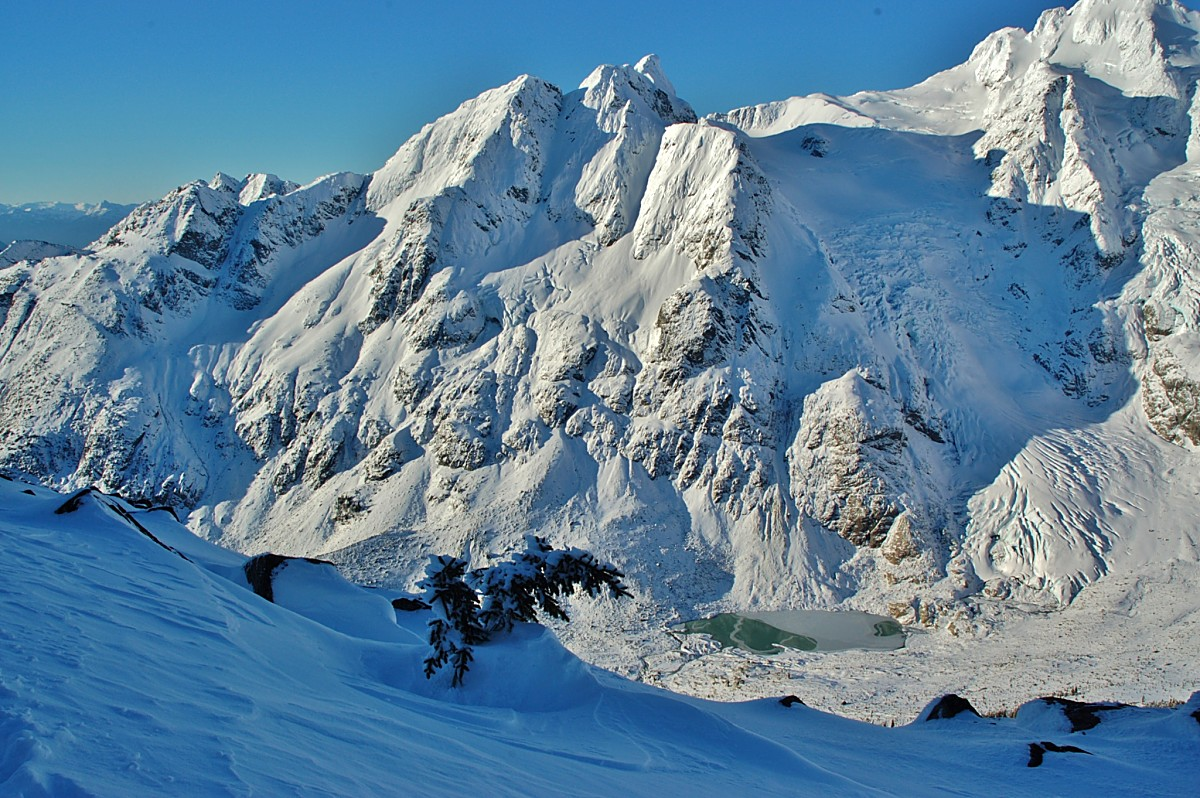
- Northeast aspect, centered

Highest point
- Elevation: 2,551 m (8,369 ft)
- Prominence: 151 m (495 ft)
- Parent peak: Mount Matier (2,783 m)
- Isolation: 0.92 km (0.57 mi)
- Listing: Mountains of British Columbia
- Coordinates: 50°19′10″N 122°25′48″W

Naming
- Etymology: John Howard

Geography
- Location within British Columbia Location within Canada
- Interactive map of Mount Howard
- Country: Canada
- Province: British Columbia
- Parent range: Joffre Group; Lillooet Ranges; Coast Mountains
- Topo map: NTS 92J8 Duffey Lake

Mount Howard is a 2,551-metre (8,369-foot) mountain summit located in the Coast Mountains of British Columbia, Canada. It is part of the Joffre Group, which is a subset of the Lillooet Ranges. Mount Howard is situated 27 km (17 mi) east of Pemberton and immediately southeast of Mount Matier. Precipitation runoff from the peak drains into Twin One Creek thence Lillooet Lake which is within the Lillooet River watershed. Mount Howard is more notable for its steep rise above local terrain than for its absolute elevation as topographic relief is significant with the summit rising 1,650 meters (5,413 ft) above Twin One Creek in 4 km (2.5 mi).

== Etymology ==
The mountain was named after John Howard, (1944–1978), an avid mountaineer and founder of a guide service that opened up the Joffre Group area for other climbers. He was killed in a climbing accident near the Columbia Icefield when he fell into a crevasse near the top of the Athabasca Glacier on February 23, 1978. The mountain's toponym was officially adopted June 11, 1979, by the Geographical Names Board of Canada.

== Climate ==
Based on the Köppen climate classification, Mount Howard is located in a subarctic climate zone of western North America. Most weather fronts originate in the Pacific Ocean, and travel east toward the Coast Mountains where they are forced upward by the range (Orographic lift), causing them to drop their moisture in the form of rain or snowfall. As a result, the Coast Mountains experience high precipitation, especially during the winter months in the form of snowfall. Winter temperatures can drop below −20 °C with wind chill factors below −30 °C. This climate supports the Twin One Glacier on the peak's north slope. The months July through September offer the most favorable weather for climbing Mount Howard.

== Gallery ==
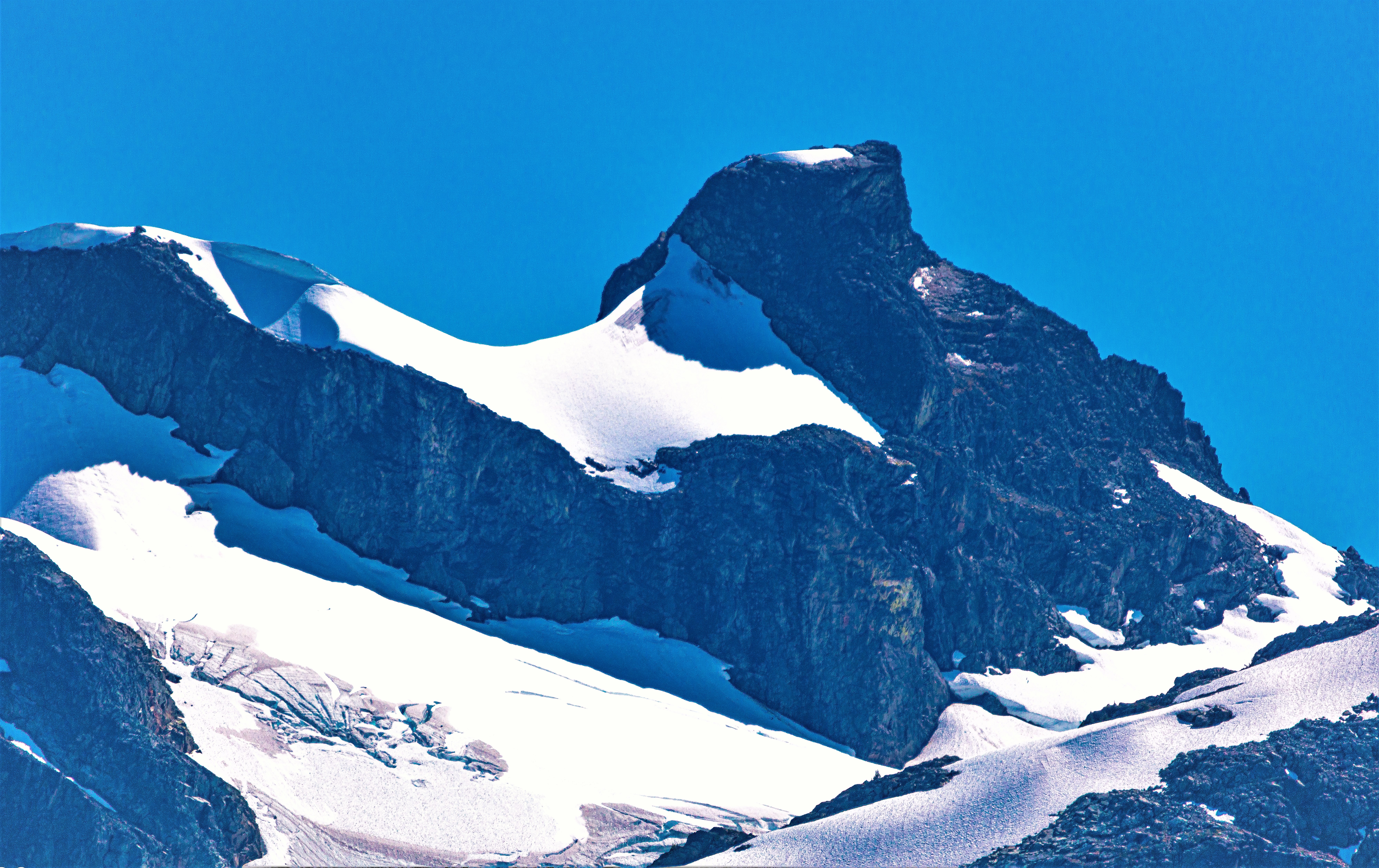
North aspect

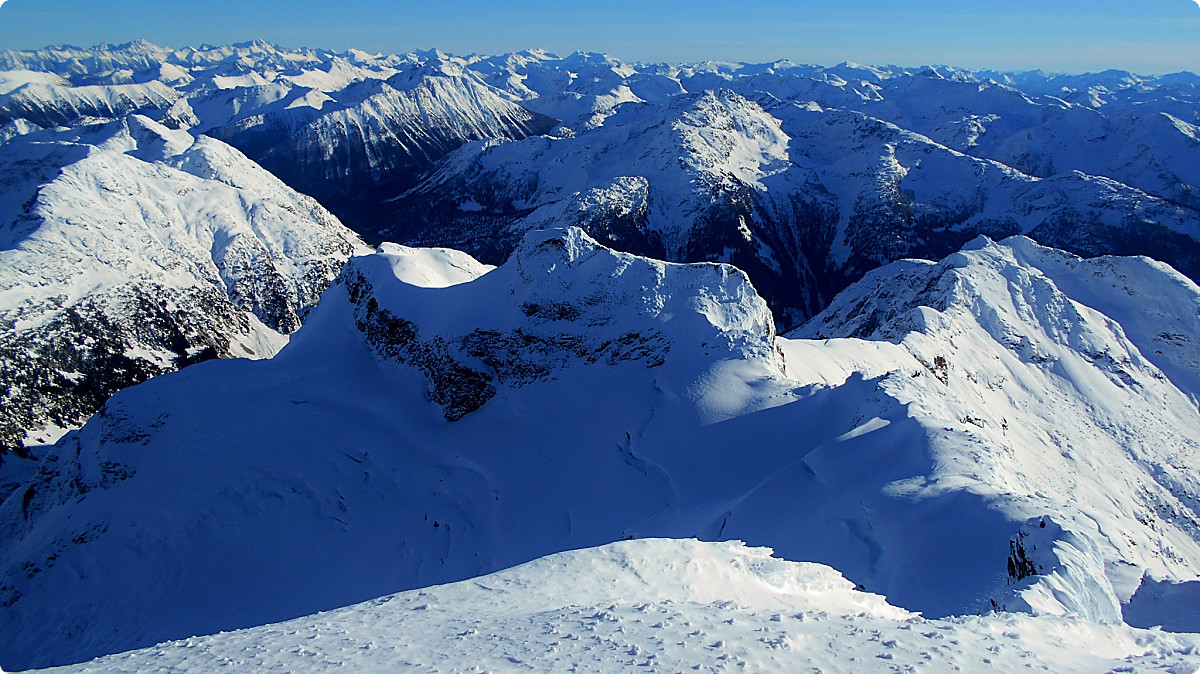
Mount Howard (centered) viewed from Mount Matier.

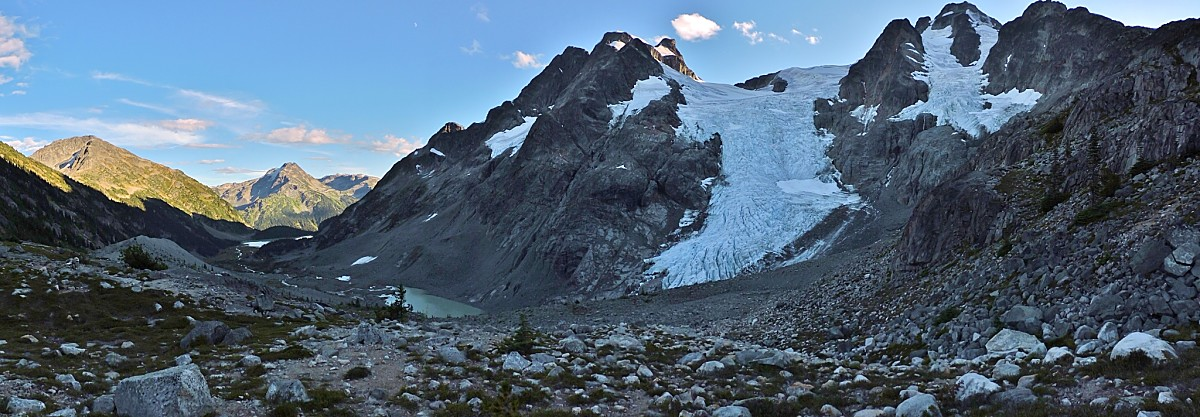
Northeast aspect of Mount Howard (centered) and Twin One Glacier. Mount Matier in upper right.

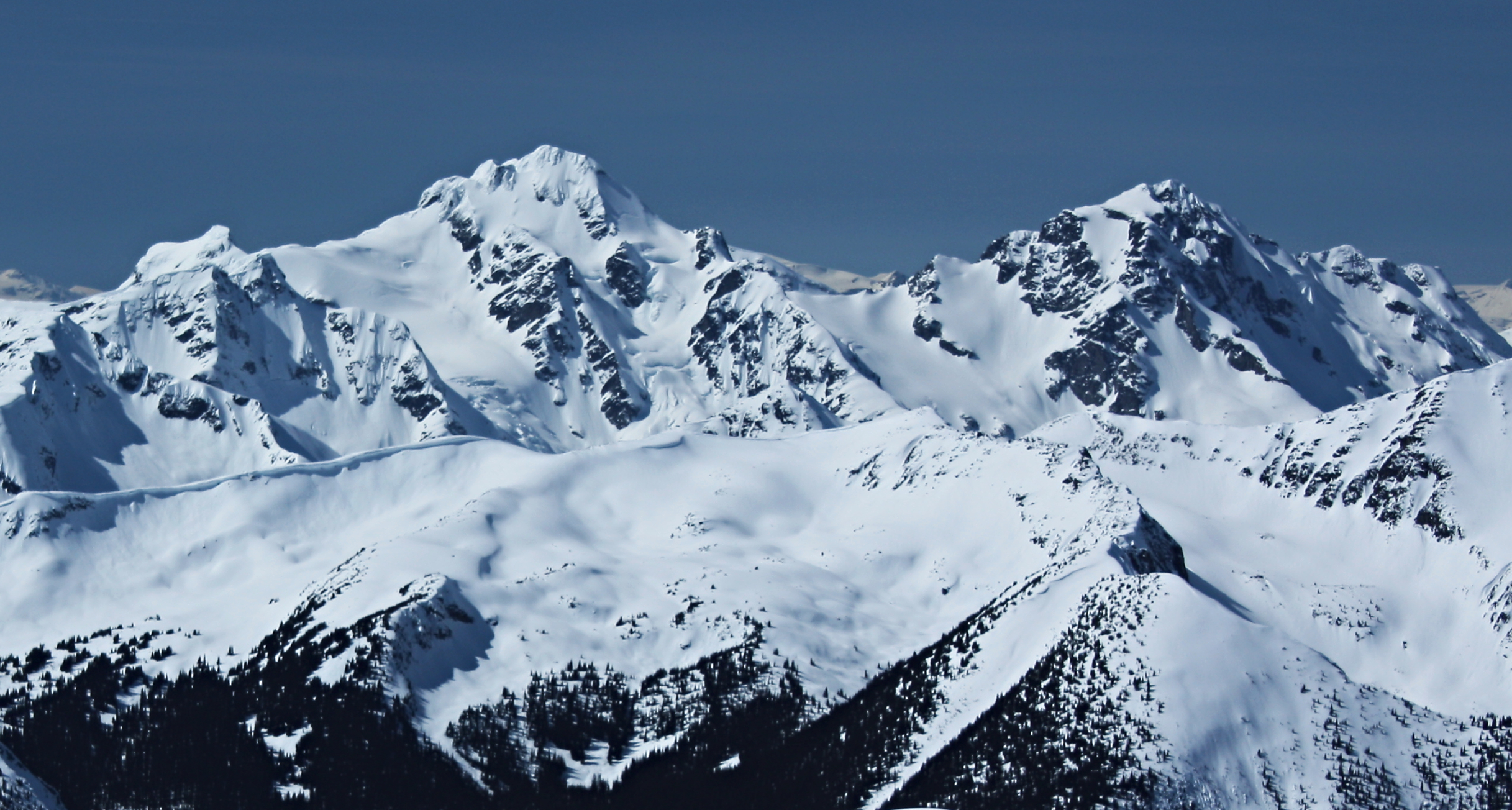
Looking west, the two major peaks are Matier (left) and Joffre (right). Mount Howard is to left of Matier.

== See also ==
- Geography of British Columbia
- Geology of British Columbia
