= Taha El Sherif Ben Amer =

Libyan politician (1936–1978)

Taha El Sherif Ben Amer (June 28, 1936 - March 6, 1978) was a Libyan engineer and politician.

He was born in the city of Benghazi, Libya in June 1936. He spent his childhood in Benghazi where he finished his primary school and high school. He was awarded a scholarship in order to pursue his education in Cairo, Egypt. In 1959 he obtained a bachelor's degree with honours in Civil Engineering from Ain Shams University.

Soon after graduation, he went back to Benghazi to work as a Junior Engineer and establish an engineering office which involved in many engineering projects across the eastern region of Libya. After the revolution in Libya in 1969, Taha El Sherif was appointed as the Deputy Minister of Transportation until 1971. Then, he became the Minister of Transportation to 1975. Soon after this date, he was selected as the Secretary of State.

On March 6, 1978 Taha El Sherif Ben Amer died in a helicopter crash of which he was going to visit a project near the city of Tripoli with the East German Politburo member Werner Lamberz who was the party's second most important ideological spokesman.
