= April 27 =

April 27 this year in various calendars
- Monday, 27 April 2026
Akan	Kwadwo
Armenian	11 Mareri 1475
Aztec	Xocotlhuetzi 7, 4 Cuāuhtli
Babylonian	9 Nisanu, 2337 SE
Balinese pawukon	Menga, Beteng, Jaya, Wage, Was, Coma of Kulantir, Kala, Jangur, Dewa
Bengali	14 Boisakh, BS 1433
Chinese	Yin Metal Goat・Exntended Net Mansion; Fire Horse Year, Month 3, Day 11 (Guyu, 8 days until Lixia)
Common Era	27 April 2026 CE
Coptic	19 Parmouti, AM 1742
Egyptian	11 Thoth, 2775 NE
Ethiopian	19 Miyāzyā, 2018 Amätä Məhrät
French Republican	Décade I, Octidi de Floréal de l'Année 234 de la République
Gregorian	27 April, AD 2026
Hebrew	10 Iyar, AM 5786; Omer 25
Hindu	Pūrvaphalgunī・Vṛddhi; Solar: 14 Vaiśākha, 1948 SE; Lunisolar: Ekādaśī, Śukla pakṣa of Vaiśākha, 2083 VE; Rāudra・5127 KY・1,872,692
Icelandic	Mánudagur, 5 Harpa 2026
Islamic	10 Dhu al-Qi'dah, AH 1447 (using tabular method)
ISO week date	2026-W18-1
Japanese	11 Yayoi, Reiwa 8 (Kokuu, 8 days until Rikka)
Julian	14 April, AD 2026 (AM 7534)
Julian day	2461158
Korean	11 Yongdal, 4359 DE
Maya	13.0.13.9.15; 8 Uo, 4 Men
Roman	ante diem XVIII Kalendas Maias, MMDCCLXXIX AUC
Solar Hijri	7 Ordibehesht, SH 1405
Tibetan	11 nag pa, me pho rta 2153 or 1772 or 1000

<<	April					>>
Su	Mo	Tu	We	Th	Fr	Sa
			1	2	3	4
5	6	7	8	9	10	11
12	13	14	15	16	17	18
19	20	21	22	23	24	25
26	27	28	29	30
2026

April 27 in recent years
2026 (Monday)
2025 (Sunday)
2024 (Saturday)
2023 (Thursday)
2022 (Wednesday)
2021 (Tuesday)
2020 (Monday)
2019 (Saturday)
2018 (Friday)
2017 (Thursday)

April 27 is the 117th day of the year (118th in leap years) in the Gregorian calendar; 248 days remain until the end of the year.

== Events ==
=== Pre-1600 ===
- 247 – Philip the Arab marks the millennium of Rome with a celebration of the ludi saeculares.
- 395 – Emperor Arcadius marries Aelia Eudoxia, daughter of the Frankish general Flavius Bauto. She becomes one of the more powerful Roman empresses of Late Antiquity.
- 711 – Islamic conquest of Hispania: Moorish troops led by Tariq ibn Ziyad land at Gibraltar to begin their invasion of the Iberian Peninsula (Al-Andalus).
- 1296 – First War of Scottish Independence: John Balliol's Scottish army is defeated by an English army commanded by John de Warenne, 6th Earl of Surrey at the Battle of Dunbar.
- 1509 – Pope Julius II places the Italian state of Venice under interdict.
- 1521 – Battle of Mactan: Explorer Ferdinand Magellan is killed by natives in the Philippines led by chief Lapulapu.
- 1522 – A Spanish-Imperial army defeats French-Venetian army in the battle of Bicocca. The battle marks the end of dominance of Swiss mercenaries on the battlefield and is one of the first where firearms play a decisive role.
- 1539 – Official founding of the city of Bogotá, New Granada (nowadays Colombia), by Nikolaus Federmann and Sebastián de Belalcázar.
- 1565 – Cebu is established becoming the first Spanish settlement in the Philippines.
- 1595 – The relics of Saint Sava are incinerated in Belgrade on the Vračar plateau by Ottoman Grand Vizier Sinan Pasha; the site of the incineration is now the location of the Church of Saint Sava, one of the largest Orthodox churches in the world

=== 1601–1900 ===
- 1650 – The Battle of Carbisdale: A Royalist army from Orkney invades mainland Scotland but is defeated by a Covenanter army.
- 1667 – Blind and impoverished, John Milton sells Paradise Lost to a printer for £10, so that it could be entered into the Stationers' Register.
- 1805 – First Barbary War: United States Marines and Berbers attack the Tripolitan city of Derna (The "shores of Tripoli" in the Marines' Hymn).
- 1813 – War of 1812: American troops capture York, the capital of Upper Canada, in the Battle of York.
- 1861 – American President Abraham Lincoln suspends the writ of habeas corpus.
- 1865 – Carrying more than 2,400 people, mostly Union army soldiers, the steamboat SS Sultana suffers a series of boiler explosions and catches fire, killing at least 1,164 passengers and crew. It is the worst maritime disaster in U.S. history to date.

=== 1901–present ===
- 1906 – The State Duma of the Russian Empire meets for the first time.
- 1909 – Sultan of Ottoman Empire Abdul Hamid II is overthrown, and is succeeded by his brother, Mehmed V.
- 1911 – The Second Canton Uprising takes place in Guangzhou, Qing China, but is suppressed.
- 1927 – Carabineros de Chile (Chilean national police force and gendarmerie) are created.
- 1936 – The United Auto Workers (UAW) gains autonomy from the American Federation of Labor.
- 1941 – World War II: German troops enter Athens.
- 1945 – World War II: The last German formations withdraw from Finland to Norway. The Lapland War and thus, World War II in Finland, comes to an end and the Raising the Flag on the Three-Country Cairn photograph is taken.
- 1945 – World War II: Benito Mussolini is arrested by Italian partisans in Dongo, while attempting escape disguised as a German soldier.
- 1953 – Operation Moolah offers $50,000 to any pilot who defects with a fully mission-capable Mikoyan-Gurevich MiG-15 to South Korea. The first pilot was to receive $100,000.
- 1967 – Expo 67 officially opens in Montreal, Quebec, Canada with a large opening ceremony broadcast around the world. It opens to the public the next day.
- 1974 – One hundred nine people are killed in a plane crash near Pulkovo Airport.
- 1976 – Thirty-seven people are killed when American Airlines Flight 625 crashes at Cyril E. King Airport in Saint Thomas, U.S. Virgin Islands.
- 1978 – John Ehrlichman, a former aide to U.S. President Richard Nixon, is released from the Federal Correctional Institution, Safford, Arizona, after serving 18 months for Watergate-related crimes.
- 1978 – The Saur Revolution begins in Afghanistan, ending the following morning with the murder of Afghan President Mohammed Daoud Khan and the establishment of the Democratic Republic of Afghanistan.
- 1978 – Willow Island disaster: In the deadliest construction accident in United States history, 51 construction workers are killed when a cooling tower under construction collapses at the Pleasants Power Station in Willow Island, West Virginia.
- 1986 – The city of Pripyat and surrounding areas are evacuated due to the Chernobyl disaster.
- 1987 – The U.S. Department of Justice bars Austrian President Kurt Waldheim (and his wife, Elisabeth, who had also been a Nazi) from entering the US, charging that he had aided in the deportations and executions of thousands of Jews and others as a German Army officer during World War II.
- 1989 – The April 27 demonstrations, student-led protests responding to the April 26 Editorial, during the Tiananmen Square protests of 1989.
- 1992 – The Federal Republic of Yugoslavia, comprising Serbia and Montenegro, is proclaimed.
- 1992 – Betty Boothroyd becomes the first woman to be elected Speaker of the British House of Commons in its 700-year history.
- 1992 – The Russian Federation and 12 other former Soviet republics become members of the International Monetary Fund and the World Bank.
- 1993 – Most of the Zambia national football team lose their lives in a plane crash off Libreville, Gabon en route to Dakar, Senegal to play a 1994 FIFA World Cup qualifying match against Senegal.
- 1994 – South African general election: The first democratic general election in South Africa, in which black citizens could vote. The Interim Constitution comes into force.This marked the end of Apartheid.
- 2005 – Airbus A380 aircraft has its maiden test flight.
- 2006 – Construction begins on the Freedom Tower (later renamed One World Trade Center) in New York City.
- 2007 – Estonian authorities remove the Bronze Soldier, a Soviet Red Army war memorial in Tallinn, amid political controversy with Russia.
- 2007 – Israeli archaeologists discover the tomb of Herod the Great south of Jerusalem.
- 2011 – The 2011 Super Outbreak devastates parts of the Southeastern United States, especially the states of Alabama, Mississippi, Georgia, and Tennessee. Two hundred five tornadoes touched down on April 27 alone, killing more than 300 and injuring hundreds more.
- 2012 – At least four explosions hit the Ukrainian city of Dnipropetrovsk with at least 27 people injured.
- 2018 – The Panmunjom Declaration is signed between North and South Korea, officially declaring their intentions to end the Korean conflict.
- 2026 – A train crash kills at least 15 people and injures 84 others near Jakarta, Indonesia.

== Births ==
=== Pre-1600 ===
- 85 BC – Decimus Junius Brutus Albinus, Roman politician and general (died 43 BC)
- 1468 – Frederick Jagiellon, Primate of Poland (died 1503)
- 1564 – Henry Percy, 9th Earl of Northumberland (died 1632)
- 1556 – François Béroalde de Verville, French writer (died 1626)
- 1593 – Mumtaz Mahal, Mughal empress buried at the Taj Mahal (died 1631)

=== 1601–1900 ===
- 1650 – Charlotte Amalie of Hesse-Kassel, Queen Consort of Denmark (1670–1699) (died 1714)
- 1654 – Charles Blount, English deist and philosopher (died 1693)
- 1701 – Charles Emmanuel III, King of Sardinia (died 1773)
- 1718 – Thomas Lewis, Irish-born American surveyor and lawyer (died 1790)
- 1748 – Adamantios Korais, Greek-French philosopher and scholar (died 1833)
- 1755 – Marc-Antoine Parseval, French mathematician and theorist (died 1836)
- 1759 – Mary Wollstonecraft, English philosopher, historian, and novelist (died 1797)
- 1788 – Charles Robert Cockerell, English architect, archaeologist, and writer (died 1863)
- 1791 – Samuel Morse, American painter and inventor, co-invented the Morse code (died 1872)
- 1812 – William W. Snow, American lawyer and politician (died 1886)
- 1812 – Friedrich von Flotow, German composer (died 1883)
- 1820 – Herbert Spencer, English biologist, anthropologist, sociologist, and philosopher (died 1903)
- 1822 – Ulysses S. Grant, American general and politician, 18th President of the United States (died 1885)
- 1840 – Edward Whymper, English-French mountaineer, explorer, author, and illustrator (died 1911)
- 1848 – Otto, King of Bavaria (died 1916)
- 1850 – Hans Hartwig von Beseler, German general and politician (died 1921)
- 1853 – Jules Lemaître, French playwright and critic (died 1914)
- 1857 – Theodor Kittelsen, Norwegian painter and illustrator (died 1914)
- 1861 – William Arms Fisher, American composer and music historian (died 1948)
- 1866 – Maurice Raoul-Duval, French polo player (died 1916)
- 1875 – Frederick Fane, Irish-born, English cricketer (died 1960)
- 1880 – Mihkel Lüdig, Estonian organist, composer, and conductor (died 1958)
- 1882 – Jessie Redmon Fauset, American author and poet (died 1961)
- 1887 – Warren Wood, American golfer (died 1926)
- 1888 – Florence La Badie, Canadian actress (died 1917)
- 1891 – Sergei Prokofiev, Russian pianist, composer, and conductor (died 1953)
- 1893 – Draža Mihailović, Serbian general (died 1946)
- 1893 – Allen Sothoron, American baseball player, coach, and manager (died 1939)
- 1894 – George Petty, American painter and illustrator (died 1975)
- 1894 – Nicolas Slonimsky, Russian pianist, composer, and conductor (died 1995)
- 1896 – Rogers Hornsby, American baseball player, coach, and manager (died 1963)
- 1896 – William Hudson, New Zealand-Australian engineer (died 1978)
- 1896 – Wallace Carothers, American chemist and inventor of nylon (died 1937)
- 1898 – Ludwig Bemelmans, Italian-American author and illustrator (died 1962)
- 1899 – Walter Lantz, American animator, producer, screenwriter, and actor (died 1994)
- 1900 – August Koern, Estonian politician and diplomat, Estonian Minister of Foreign Affairs in exile (died 1989)

=== 1901–present ===
- 1902 – Tiemoko Garan Kouyaté, Malian educator and activist (died 1942)
- 1904 – Cecil Day-Lewis, Anglo-Irish poet and author (died 1972)
- 1904 – Nikos Zachariadis, Greek politician (died 1973)
- 1905 – John Kuck, American javelin thrower and shot putter (died 1986)
- 1906 – Yiorgos Theotokas, Greek author and playwright (died 1966)
- 1909 – Lim Bo Seng, Chinese businessman, resistance fighter of Force 136 and war hero of Singapore (died 1944)
- 1910 – Chiang Ching-kuo, Chinese politician, 3rd President of the Republic of China (died 1988)
- 1911 – Bruno Beger, German anthropologist and ethnologist (died 2009)
- 1911 – Chris Berger, Dutch sprinter and footballer (died 1965)
- 1912 – Jacques de Bourbon-Busset, French author and politician (died 2001)
- 1912 – Zohra Sehgal, Indian actress, dancer, and choreographer (died 2014)
- 1913 – Philip Abelson, American physicist and author (died 2004)
- 1913 – Irving Adler, American mathematician, author, and academic (died 2012)
- 1913 – Luz Long, German long jumper and soldier (died 1943)
- 1916 – Robert Hugh McWilliams, Jr., American sergeant, lawyer, and judge (died 2013)
- 1916 – Enos Slaughter, American baseball player and manager (died 2002)
- 1917 – Roman Matsov, Estonian violinist, pianist, and conductor (died 2001)
- 1918 – Sten Rudholm, Swedish lawyer and jurist (died 2008)
- 1920 – Guido Cantelli, Italian conductor (died 1956)
- 1920 – Mark Krasnosel'skii, Ukrainian mathematician and academic (died 1997)
- 1920 – James Robert Mann, American colonel, lawyer, and politician (died 2010)
- 1920 – Edwin Morgan, Scottish poet and translator (died 2010)
- 1921 – Robert Dhéry, French actor, director, and screenwriter (died 2004)
- 1922 – Jack Klugman, American actor (died 2012)
- 1922 – Sheila Scott, English nurse and pilot (died 1988)
- 1923 – Betty Mae Tiger Jumper, Seminole chief (died 2011)
- 1924 – Vernon B. Romney, American lawyer and politician, 14th Attorney General of Utah (died 2013)
- 1925 – Derek Chinnery, English broadcaster (died 2015)
- 1926 – Tim LaHaye, American minister, activist, and author (died 2016)
- 1926 – Basil A. Paterson, American lawyer and politician, 59th Secretary of State of New York (died 2014)
- 1926 – Alan Reynolds, English painter and educator (died 2014)
- 1927 – Coretta Scott King, African-American activist and author (died 2006)
- 1927 – Joe Moakley, American soldier, lawyer, and politician (died 2001)
- 1929 – Nina Ponomaryova, Russian discus thrower and coach (died 2016)
- 1931 – Igor Oistrakh, Ukrainian violinist and educator (died 2021)
- 1932 – Anouk Aimée, French actress (died 2024)
- 1932 – Pik Botha, South African lawyer, politician, and diplomat, 8th South African Ambassador to the United States (died 2018)
- 1932 – Casey Kasem, American disc jockey, radio celebrity, and voice actor; co-created American Top 40 (died 2014)
- 1932 – Chuck Knox, American football coach (died 2018)
- 1932 – Derek Minter, English motorcycle racer (died 2015)
- 1932 – Gian-Carlo Rota, Italian-American mathematician and philosopher (died 1999)
- 1933 – Peter Imbert, Baron Imbert, English police officer and politician, Lord Lieutenant for Greater London (died 2017)
- 1935 – Theodoros Angelopoulos, Greek director, producer, and screenwriter (died 2012)
- 1935 – Ron Morris, American pole vaulter and coach (died 2024)
- 1936 – Geoffrey Shovelton, English singer and illustrator (died 2016)
- 1937 – Sandy Dennis, American actress (died 1992)
- 1937 – Robin Eames, Irish Anglican archbishop
- 1937 – Richard Perham, English biologist and academic (died 2015)
- 1938 – Earl Anthony, American bowler and sportscaster (died 2001)
- 1938 – Alain Caron, Canadian ice hockey player (died 1986)
- 1939 – Judy Carne, English actress and comedian (died 2015)
- 1939 – Stanisław Dziwisz, Polish cardinal
- 1941 – Fethullah Gülen, Turkish preacher and theologian (died 2024)
- 1941 – Dilip Kumar Chakrabarti, Indian archaeologist
- 1941 – Lee Roy Jordan, American football player
- 1942 – Ruth Glick, American author
- 1942 – Jim Keltner, American drummer
- 1943 – Helmut Marko, Austrian race car driver and manager
- 1944 – Michael Fish, English meteorologist and journalist
- 1944 – Cuba Gooding Sr., American singer (died 2017)
- 1944 – Herb Pedersen, American singer-songwriter and guitarist
- 1945 – Martin Chivers, English footballer and manager (died 2026)
- 1945 – Terry Willesee, Australian journalist and television host
- 1945 – August Wilson, American author and playwright (died 2005)
- 1946 – Franz Roth, German footballer
- 1947 – G. K. Butterfield, African-American soldier, lawyer, and politician
- 1947 – Nick Greiner, Hungarian-Australian politician, 37th Premier of New South Wales
- 1947 – Pete Ham, Welsh singer-songwriter and guitarist (died 1975)
- 1947 – Keith Magnuson, Canadian ice hockey player and coach (died 2003)
- 1947 – Ann Peebles, American soul singer-songwriter
- 1948 – Frank Abagnale Jr., American security consultant and criminal
- 1948 – Josef Hickersberger, Austrian footballer, coach, and manager
- 1948 – Kate Pierson, American singer-songwriter and bass player
- 1950 – Jaime Fresnedi, Filipino politician
- 1950 – David W. Duclon, American television writer and producer (died 2025)
- 1951 – Ace Frehley, American guitarist and songwriter (died 2025)
- 1952 – Larry Elder, American lawyer and talk show host
- 1952 – George Gervin, American basketball player
- 1952 – Ari Vatanen, Finnish race car driver and politician
- 1953 – Arielle Dombasle, French-American actress and model
- 1954 – Frank Bainimarama, Fijian commander and politician, 8th Prime Minister of Fiji
- 1954 – Herman Edwards, American football player, coach, and sportscaster
- 1954 – Mark Holden, Australian singer, actor, and lawyer
- 1955 – Eric Schmidt, American engineer and businessman
- 1956 – Bryan Harvey, American singer-songwriter and guitarist (died 2006)
- 1957 – Dietmar Keck, Austrian politician
- 1957 – Willie Upshaw, American baseball player and manager
- 1959 – Sheena Easton, Scottish-American singer-songwriter, actress, and producer
- 1959 – Marco Pirroni, English singer-songwriter, guitarist, and producer
- 1960 – Mike Krushelnyski, Canadian ice hockey player and coach
- 1961 – Andrew Schlafly, American lawyer and activist, founded Conservapedia
- 1962 – Ángel Comizzo, Argentinian footballer and manager
- 1962 – Seppo Räty, Finnish javelin thrower and coach
- 1962 – Im Sang-soo, South Korean director and screenwriter
- 1962 – Andrew Selous, English soldier and politician
- 1963 – Russell T Davies, Welsh screenwriter and producer
- 1965 – Anna Chancellor, English actress
- 1966 – Siobhan Finneran, English actress
- 1966 – Peter McIntyre, Australian cricketer
- 1966 – Yoshihiro Togashi, Japanese illustrator
- 1967 – Willem-Alexander, King of the Netherlands
- 1967 – Tommy Smith, Scottish saxophonist, composer, and educator
- 1967 – Erik Thomson, Scottish-New Zealand actor
- 1967 – Jason Whitlock, American football player and journalist
- 1968 – Dana Milbank, American journalist and author
- 1969 – Cory Booker, African-American lawyer and politician
- 1969 – Darcey Bussell, English ballerina
- 1972 – Nigel Barker, English photographer and author
- 1973 – Sharlee D'Angelo, Swedish bass player and songwriter
- 1973 – Sébastien Lareau, Canadian tennis player
- 1974 – Frank Catalanotto, American baseball player
- 1975 – Chris Carpenter, American baseball player
- 1975 – Pedro Feliz, Dominican baseball player
- 1975 – Kazuyoshi Funaki, Japanese ski jumper
- 1976 – Isobel Campbell, Scottish singer-songwriter and cellist
- 1976 – Sally Hawkins, English actress
- 1976 – Walter Pandiani, Uruguayan footballer
- 1979 – Vladimir Kozlov, Ukrainian actor and wrestler
- 1980 – Sybille Bammer, Austrian tennis player
- 1980 – Christian Lara, Ecuadorian footballer
- 1983 – Ari Graynor, American actress and producer
- 1984 – Pierre-Marc Bouchard, Canadian ice hockey player
- 1984 – Daniel Holdsworth, Australian rugby league player
- 1984 – Patrick Stump, American musician, singer, and songwriter
- 1985 – Meselech Melkamu, Ethiopian runner
- 1986 – Jenna Coleman, English actress
- 1986 – Dinara Safina, Russian tennis player
- 1987 – Taylor Chorney, American ice hockey player
- 1987 – William Moseley, English actor
- 1987 – Wang Feifei, Chinese singer and actress
- 1988 – Lizzo, American singer and rapper
- 1988 – Semyon Varlamov, Russian ice hockey player
- 1989 – Lars Bender, German footballer
- 1989 – Sven Bender, German footballer
- 1990 – Austin Dillon, American race car driver
- 1990 &nfash; Balendra Shah, Nepali politician and former rapper, Prime Minister of Nepal
- 1991 – Lara Gut, Swiss skier
- 1992 – Keenan Allen, American football player
- 1994 – Corey Seager, American baseball player
- 1995 – Nick Kyrgios, Australian tennis player
- 1997 – Jesse Ramien, Australian rugby league player
- 1998 – Cristian Romero, Argentine footballer
- 1999 – Peter Hola, Australian rugby league player
- 2002 – Anthony Elanga, Swedish footballer
- 2003 – Xavier Worthy, American football player
- 2004 – Arch Manning, American football player
- 2005 – Mathys Tel, French footballer

== Deaths ==
=== Pre-1600 ===
- 630 – Ardashir III of Persia (born 621)
- 1160 – Rudolf I, Count of Bregenz (born 1081)
- 1272 – Zita, Italian saint (born 1212)
- 1321 – Nicolò Albertini, Italian cardinal statesman (born c. 1250)
- 1353 – Simeon of Moscow, Grand Prince of Moscow and Vladimir
- 1403 – Maria of Bosnia, Countess of Helfenstein (born 1335)
- 1404 – Philip II, Duke of Burgundy (born 1342)
- 1463 – Isidore of Kiev (born 1385)
- 1521 – Ferdinand Magellan, Portuguese sailor and explorer (born 1480)
- 1599 – Maeda Toshiie, Japanese general (born 1538)

=== 1601–1900 ===
- 1605 – Pope Leo XI (born 1535)
- 1607 – Edward Cromwell, 3rd Baron Cromwell, Governor of Lecale (born 1560)
- 1613 – Robert Abercromby, Scottish priest and missionary (born 1532)
- 1656 – Jan van Goyen, Dutch painter and illustrator (born 1596)
- 1694 – John George IV, Elector of Saxony (born 1668)
- 1695 – John Trenchard, English politician, Secretary of State for the Northern Department (born 1640)
- 1702 – Jean Bart, French admiral (born 1651)
- 1782 – William Talbot, 1st Earl Talbot, English politician, Lord Steward of the Household (born 1710)
- 1813 – Zebulon Pike, American general and explorer (born 1779)
- 1873 – William Macready, English actor and manager (born 1793)
- 1882 – Ralph Waldo Emerson, American poet and philosopher (born 1803)
- 1893 – John Ballance, Irish-born New Zealand journalist and politician, 14th Prime Minister of New Zealand (born 1839)
- 1896 – Henry Parkes, English-Australian businessman and politician, 7th Premier of New South Wales (born 1815)

=== 1901–present ===
- 1915 – John Labatt, Canadian businessman (born 1838)
- 1915 – Alexander Scriabin, Russian pianist and composer (born 1872)
- 1932 – Hart Crane, American poet (born 1899)
- 1936 – Karl Pearson, English mathematician and academic (born 1857)
- 1937 – Antonio Gramsci, Italian sociologist, linguist, and politician (born 1891)
- 1938 – Edmund Husserl, Czech mathematician and philosopher (born 1859)
- 1949 – Benjamin Faunce, American druggist and businessman (born 1873)
- 1952 – Guido Castelnuovo, Italian mathematician and statistician (born 1865)
- 1961 – Roy Del Ruth, American director, producer, and screenwriter (born 1893)
- 1962 – A. K. Fazlul Huq, Bangladeshi-Pakistani lawyer and politician, Pakistani Minister of the Interior (born 1873)
- 1964 – Jack Critchley, Australian politician (born 1892)
- 1965 – Edward R. Murrow, American journalist (born 1908)
- 1967 – William Douglas Cook, New Zealand farmer, founded the Eastwoodhill Arboretum (born 1884)
- 1969 – René Barrientos, Bolivian soldier, pilot, and politician, 55th President of Bolivia (born 1919)
- 1970 – Arthur Shields, Irish rebel and actor (born 1896)
- 1972 – Kwame Nkrumah, Ghanaian politician, 1st President of Ghana (born 1909)
- 1973 – Carlos Menditeguy, Argentinian race car driver and polo player (born 1914)
- 1977 – Stanley Adams, American actor and screenwriter (born 1915)
- 1988 – Fred Bear, American hunter and author (born 1902)
- 1989 – Konosuke Matsushita, Japanese businessman, founded Panasonic (born 1894)
- 1992 – Olivier Messiaen, French organist and composer (born 1908)
- 1992 – Gerard K. O'Neill, American physicist and astronomer (born 1927)
- 1995 – Katherine DeMille, Canadian-American actress (born 1911)
- 1995 – Willem Frederik Hermans, Dutch author, poet, and playwright (born 1921)
- 1996 – William Colby, American diplomat, 10th Director of Central Intelligence (born 1920)
- 1996 – Gilles Grangier, French director and screenwriter (born 1911)
- 1998 – John W. H. Bassett, Canadian journalist and politician (born 1915)
- 1998 – Carlos Castaneda, Peruvian-American anthropologist and author (born 1925)
- 1998 – Anne Desclos, French journalist and author (born 1907)
- 1998 – Browning Ross, American runner and soldier (born 1924)
- 1999 – Al Hirt, American trumpet player and bandleader (born 1922)
- 1999 – Dale C. Thomson, Canadian historian, author, and academic (born 1923)
- 1999 – Cyril Washbrook, English cricketer (born 1914)
- 2002 – George Alec Effinger, American author (born 1947)
- 2002 – Ruth Handler, American inventor and businesswoman, created the Barbie doll (born 1916)
- 2005 – Red Horner, Canadian ice hockey player (born 1909)
- 2006 – Julia Thorne, American author (born 1944)
- 2007 – Mstislav Rostropovich, Russian cellist and conductor (born 1927)
- 2009 – Frankie Manning, American dancer and choreographer (born 1914)
- 2009 – Woo Seung-yeon, South Korean model and actress (born 1983)
- 2009 – Feroz Khan (actor), Indian Actor, Film Director & Producer (born 1939)
- 2011 – Marian Mercer, American actress and singer (born 1935)
- 2012 – Daniel E. Boatwright, American soldier and politician (born 1930)
- 2012 – Bill Skowron, American baseball player (born 1930)
- 2013 – Aída Bortnik, Argentinian screenwriter (born 1938)
- 2013 – Lorraine Copeland, Scottish archaeologist (born 1921)
- 2013 – Antonio Díaz Jurado, Spanish footballer (born 1969)
- 2013 – Jérôme Louis Heldring, Dutch journalist and author (born 1917)
- 2013 – Aloysius Jin Luxian, Chinese bishop (born 1916)
- 2013 – Mutula Kilonzo, Kenyan lawyer and politician, Kenyan Minister of Justice (born 1948)
- 2014 – Yigal Arnon, Israeli lawyer (born 1929)
- 2014 – Vujadin Boškov, Serbian footballer, coach, and manager (born 1931)
- 2014 – Daniel Colchico, American football player and coach (born 1935)
- 2014 – Harry Firth, Australian race car driver and manager (born 1918)
- 2015 – Gene Fullmer, American boxer (born 1931)
- 2015 – Verne Gagne, American football player, wrestler, and trainer (born 1926)
- 2015 – Alexander Rich, American biologist, biophysicist, and academic (born 1924)
- 2017 – Vinod Khanna, Indian actor, producer and politician (born 1946)
- 2017 – Sadanoyama Shinmatsu, Japanese sumo wrestler (born 1938)
- 2021 – Manoj Das, Indian writer (born 1934)
- 2022 – Liao Guoxun, Chinese politician (born 1963)
- 2023 – Jerry Springer, American politician and actor (born 1944)
- 2024 – C. J. Sansom, British author (born 1952)
- 2025 – Jiggly Caliente, Filipino-American drag performer, singer and actress (born 1980)

== Holidays and observances ==
- Christian feast days:
  - Assicus
  - Floribert of Liège
  - John of Constantinople
  - Liberalis of Treviso
  - Blessed María Antonia Bandrés Elósegui
  - Blessed Osanna of Cattaro
  - Pedro Armengol
  - Pollio
  - Virgin of Montserrat, co-patroness of Catalonia
  - Zita
  - Origen Adamantius
  - April 27 (Eastern Orthodox liturgics)
- Day of Russian Parliamentarism (Russia)
- Day of the Uprising Against the Occupying Forces (Slovenia)
- Flag Day (Moldova)
- Freedom Day (South Africa)
- Independence Day, celebrates the independence of Sierra Leone from United Kingdom in 1961.
- Independence Day, celebrates the independence of Togo from France in 1960.
- King's Day (Netherlands, Aruba, Curaçao, Sint Maarten) (celebrated on April 26 if April 27 falls on a Sunday)
- National Veterans' Day (Finland)
