= Public holidays in Indonesia =

The following table indicates declared Indonesian government national holidays. Cultural variants also provide opportunity for holidays tied to local events. Beside official holidays, there are the so-called "libur bersama" or "cuti bersama", or joint leave(s) declared nationwide by the government. In total there are 20 public holidays every year.

== List of national public holidays ==
=== General holidays ===
Date	English name	Local name	Remarks
1 January	New Year's Day	Tahun Baru Masehi	New Year of Gregorian calendar; National public holiday since 1946.
1 May	Labour Day	Hari Buruh Internasional	National public holiday between 1953 and 1967 and reinforced since 2014.
1 June	Pancasila Day	Hari Lahir Pancasila	Marks the date of Sukarno's 1945 address on Pancasila upon the members of the Investigating Committee for Preparatory Work for Independence; National public holiday since 2017.
17 August	Independence Day	Hari Kemerdekaan Republik Indonesia	Anniversary of the proclamation of independence read by Sukarno in 1945; National public holiday since 1946.

=== Religious holidays ===
Date	English name	Local name	Remarks
25 December	Christmas Day	Hari Raya Natal	Birth of Jesus Christ; National public holiday since 1953.
1 Muharram	Islamic New Year	Tahun Baru Hijriah	1st day of the Muharram, the beginning of the New Islamic Year; National public holiday between 1953 and 1962 and reinforced since 1968.
12 Rabi' al-Awwal	Mawlid	Maulid Nabi Muhammad SAW	Birthday of the Islamic prophet Muhammad; National public holiday between 1953 and 1962 and reinforced since 1968.
27 Rajab	Isra' and Mi'raj	Isra Mikraj Nabi Muhammad SAW	Prophet Muhammad ascended to the sky during a night journey; National public holiday between 1953 and 1962 and reinforced since 1968.
1-2 Shawwal	Eid al-Fitr	Hari Raya Fitrah	National public holiday since 1953.
1-2 Shawwal	Eid al-Fitr	Lebaran Mudik	National public holiday since 1953.
10 Dhu al-Hijjah	Eid al-Adha	Hari Raya Kurban	National public holiday since 1953.
10 Dhu al-Hijjah	Eid al-Adha	Lebaran Haji	National public holiday since 1953.
variable	Chinese New Year	Tahun Baru Imlek	National public holiday since 2003.
variable	Nyepi	Hari Suci Nyepi	National public holiday since 1983.
variable	Nyepi	Tahun Baru Saka	National public holiday since 1983.
variable	Good Friday	Wafat Yesus Kristus	The Friday before Easter (the first Sunday after the first Paschal Full Moon following the vernal equinox); National public holiday between 1953 and 1962 and reinforced since 1971.
variable	Easter	Hari Paskah	National public holiday since 2024.
variable	Easter	Kebangkitan Yesus Kristus	National public holiday since 2024.
variable	Ascension Day	Kenaikan Yesus Kristus	Commemorates the Christian Belief of the bodily Ascension of Jesus into the heaven.; National public holiday between 1953 and 1962 and reinforced since 1968.
variable	Vesak	Hari Raya Waisak	National public holiday since 1983.

=== General / local elections ===
Under Law Number 7 of 2017 concerning General Elections, Polling Day for a general election or a regional election is a public holiday that is gazetted by the returning officer from the General Elections Commission. Under the Circular Letter (SE) of the Minister of Manpower, employees not required to work on that day are entitled to one day off in lieu or be given one day's pay.

Latest Date	Name	Remarks	Last Election
14 February 2024	General Election	To elect the next Parliament of Indonesia and President of Indonesia	2024 general election
27 November 2024	Local election	To elect the next Governor, Mayoral, and Regent	2024 local election

== Other observances ==
In addition to the official holidays, many religious, historical, other traditional holidays, and even United Nations observances populate the calendar, as well as observances proclaimed by officials and lighter celebrations. These are often observed by businesses and schools as holidays.

Since the presidency of Joko Widodo, the government often give "national themes" to commemorate these observances, even if these are United Nations observances with a UN-designated theme.

Date (Gregorian calendar)	English name	Local name	Year established	Remarks
variable	Galungan and Kuningan	Galungan dan Kuningan		
variable	Diwali	Hari Raya Diwali		
variable	Lantern Festival	Cap Go Meh		Ending of 15th days celebration of Chinese New Year
3 January	Ministry of Religious Affairs Day	Hari Kementerian Agama Republik Indonesia		The founding of the Indonesian Ministry of Religious Affairs in 1946, during the First Sjahrir Cabinet
15 January	Ocean Duty Day / Day of the Sea and Ocean Event	Hari Dharma Samudera / Hari Peristiwa Laut dan Samudera		Commemorate the services and sacrifices of those who died in various battles at sea. The day is the date of the Battle of Arafura Sea in 1962.
25 January	Food and Nutrition Day / National Nutrition Day	Hari Gizi dan Makanan / Hari Gizi Nasional		The day of the founding of dietetic school Sekolah Djuru Penerang Makanan on 25 January 1951 by Poorwo Soedarmo.
30 January	Indonesian Primate Day	Hari Primata Indonesia	2014	
9 February	National Press Day / Anniversary of the Indonesian Journalists Association	Hari Pers Nasional (HPN) / Hari Ulang Tahun Persatuan Wartawan Indonesia	1985	The 1946 founding of the Indonesian Journalists Association (PWI)
21 February	National Waste Awareness Day	Hari Peduli Sampah Nasional	2006	In remembrance of the 2005 Leuwigajah landslide which killed 143 people.
1 March	State Sovereignty Enforcement Day	Hari Penegakan Kedaulatan Negara	2022	Commemoration of the 1949 General Offensive in Yogyakarta.
8 March	International Women's Day	Hari Perempuan Internasional		United Nations observance.
9 March	National Music Day	Hari Musik Nasional	2013	Birthday of Wage Rudolf Supratman, author of the Indonesian national anthem.
18 March	Indonesian Architecture Day	Hari Arsitektur Indonesia		
30 March	National Film Day	Hari Film Nasional	1999	First shooting day of Darah dan Doa, the first "national film".
1 April	National Broadcasting Day	Hari Penyiaran Nasional	2019	Commemorates the 1933 establishment of the first radio station owned by native Indonesians, Solosche Radio Vereeniging (SRV).
4 April	National Encryption Day	Hari Persandian Nasional		Commemorates the 1946 establishment of the Codes Service (Dinas Kode) by Roebiono Kertopati on the orders of Defence Minister Amir Sjarifuddin.
6 April	National Fisherman Day	Hari Nelayan Nasional		
9 April	Air Force Day	Hari Jadi TNI Angkatan Udara	1950	Honors the active and reserve serving men and women and veterans of the Indonesian Air Force
20 April	National Consumer Day	Hari Konsumen Nasional	2012	
21 April	Kartini Day	Hari Kartini		"Women Emancipation Day". The birthday of Kartini, an Indonesian women's rights activist.
22 April	Earth Day	Hari Bumi		United Nations observance.
25 April	Regional Autonomy Day	Hari Otonomi Daerah	1996	
28 April	National Poetry Day / National Literature Day	Hari Puisi Nasional		The anniversary of the death of one of Indonesia's leading poet legends, Chairil Anwar.
30 April	National Information Openness Day	Hari Keterbukaan Informasi Nasional	2015	Commemorates the promulgation of the Public Information Openness Act of 2008 (Undang-Undang Keterbukaan Informasi Publik 2008, formal name: Act No. 14 of 2008 on Public Information Openness [Undang-Undang No. 14 Tahun 2008 Tentang Keterbukaan Informasi Publik]).
2 May	National Education Day	Hari Pendidikan Nasional	1959	Birthday of Ki Hajar Dewantara, founder of Taman Siswa and first Minister of Education during the Presidential Cabinet
11 May	Day of the Military Police of the Indonesian National Armed Forces	Hari POM TNI		
17 May	National Book Day	Hari Buku Nasional	2002	Anniversary of the National Library of the Republic of Indonesia.
18 May	National Archives Day	Hari Kearsipan Nasional	2005	Commemorates the promulgation of the Archives Basic Provision Act of 1971 (formal name: Act No. 7 of 1971 on Basic Provision of Archives [Undang-Undang No. 7 Tahun 1971 Tentang Ketentuan Pokok Kearsipan]).
20 May	National Awakening Day	Hari Kebangkitan Nasional	1985	Commemorates the 1908 formation of the first nationalist group, Budi Utomo. Since 2008 it was observed by the Indonesian Doctors' Union as Indonesian Doctors' Service Day (Hari Bakti Dokter Indonesia) as Budi Utomo's founding members are STOVIA students.
29 May	National Elderly Day	Hari Lanjut Usia Nasional	1996	The date of the opening day of the first plenary meeting of the Investigating Committee for Preparatory Work for Independence (BPUPK) which was led by Rajiman Wediodiningrat who was 66 at the time of the event in 1945.
21 June	Agricultural Activity Day	Hari Krida Pertanian	1972	
24 June	National Midwife Day	Hari Bidan Nasional	1951	
26 June	International Day Against Drug Abuse and Illicit Trafficking	Hari Anti Narkoba Internasional (lit. 'International Anti-Drug Day')		United Nations observance.
29 June	National Family Day	Hari Keluarga Nasional (Harganas)	2014	
1 July	Bhayangkara Day	Hari Bhayangkara		Official anniversary of the Indonesian National Police (formally formed the previous year; this date commemorates the day it became a non-departmental public body)
5 July	Bank Indonesia Day	Hari Bank Indonesia		
7 July	National Librarian Day	Hari Pustakawan Nasional	2025	Commemorates the 1973 establishment of the Indonesian Librarians Association (IPI).
14 July	Tax Day	Hari Pajak	2017	
22 July	Attorney Day	Hari Kejaksaan / Hari Bhakti Adhyaksa	1961	The establishment of the Indonesian Attorney as a stand-alone institution in 1960, previously a non-departmental institutions under the Department of Justice.
23 July	National Children's Day	Hari Anak Nasional	1984	
24 July	Kebaya Day	Hari Kebaya Nasional	2023	
6 August	National Space Day	Hari Keantariksaan Nasional	2013	Commemorates the promulgation of the Space Act of 2013 (Undang-Undang Keantariksaan 2013, formal name: Act No. 21 of 2013 on Space [Undang-Undang No. 21 Tahun 2013 Tentang Keantariksaan])
8 August	Indonesian Game Day	Hari Gim Indonesia		
10 August	National Veterans' Day	Hari Veteran Nasional	2014	
10 August	National Technology Uprising Day	Hari Kebangkitan Teknologi Nasional	1995	Commemorates the maiden flight of the IPTN N-250
14 August	Gerakan Pramuka Indonesia Day	Hari Pramuka	1961	Commemorates the public inauguration of the Indonesian Scout Movement on 14 August 1961, marked by the handover of the Indonesian scout flag by Presidential Decree. The movement has been established earlier on 20 May in the same year.
18 August	Constitution Day	Hari Konstitusi Republik Indonesia	2008	Commemorates the promulgation in 1945 of the Constitution of Indonesia, also marked as the official anniversary of the People's Consultative Assembly (MPR)
22 August	National Police Service Day	Hari Juang Kepolisian Negara	2023	Commemorates the formal establishment of the Indonesian National Police on August 19, 1945, and the formation of the first city police department post-Independence in Surabaya three days later (Aug. 22, 1945)
24 August	Television Day / Anniversary of TVRI	Hari Televisi / Hari Ulang Tahun Televisi Republik Indonesia	1962	The day of the opening ceremony of the 1962 Asian Games, the very first programme officially broadcast for the general public by TVRI. Also TVRI's anniversary.
4 September	National Customer Day	Hari Pelanggan Nasional	2003	
9 September	National Sports Day	Hari Olahraga Nasional	1983	Commemorates the opening day of the first National Sports Week in Surakarta in 1948, initially devised as an alternative to the then-newborn state's ineligibility to participate in the 1948 Summer Olympics.
11 September	National Radio Day / Anniversary of RRI	Hari Radio Nasional / Hari Ulang Tahun Radio Republik Indonesia	1945	Commemorates the takeover of Japanese-military operated radio stations by Indonesians on 1945. Also RRI's anniversary.
17 September	Red Cross Day	Hari Palang Merah	1945	Commemorates the establishment of the Indonesian Red Cross Society on 17 September 1945, marked by the formation of the executive board with its first chairman, Mohammad Hatta.
17 September	National Transport Day	Hari Perhubungan Nasional	1971	Designated by the then Minister of Transportation to simplify national transport days as well as due to the reason that state-owned transport companies (like Perum DAMRI and Kereta Api Indonesia) have nearby anniversaries.
23 September / 21 August	National Maritime Day	Hari Maritim Nasional	1964	The proposal of 21 August as National Maritime Day (the day when the Indonesian independence fighter attacked the Japanese military storage in Pulau Nyamukan (Djamuan Riff), near Surabaya, on 21 August 1945) was disputed by the Association of Indonesian Marine Youth (APMI) because at that time the Indonesian Navy has not been formed. BKR Laut, the predecessor of the Indonesian Navy, was formed later on 10 September 1945. The 23 September date refers to the first (and last) Musyawarah Maritim in 1963, and actually has been established as National Maritime Day in 1964 during the tenure of Sukarno as the president of Indonesia but was overlooked by the recent government.
24 September	National Agrarian and Spatial Planning Day / National Peasants' Day	Hari Agraria dan Tata Ruang Nasional/Hari Tani Nasional	1963 (for the National Peasants' Day)	Commemorates the promulgation of the Agrarian Basics Act of 1960 (Undang-Undang Pokok Agraria 1960, formal name: Act No. 5 of 1960 on Basic Law on Agrarian Affairs [Undang-Undang No. 5 Tahun 1960 Tentang Peraturan Dasar Pokok-pokok Agraria])
26 September	National Statistics Day	Hari Statistik Nasional		Commemorated to increase public awareness of the importance of statistics, increase public participation in statistics and encouraging statistical players to continue to carry out statistical activities in accordance with applicable rules.
27 September	Post and Telecommunications' Service Day	Hari Bakti Pos dan Telekomunikasi		Commemorates the 1945 takeover of Japanese military-controlled post, telegraph and telephone systems of Java by the Indonesian revolutionary youth. However, Telkom Indonesia and Pos Indonesia do not commemorate this day anymore as their anniversaries; instead they observed their anniversaries at 6 July (to commemorate the separation of post and telecommunications public corporations in 1965) and 26 August (the opening of the first post office in Batavia by the then Governor-General of the Dutch East Indies, Gustaaf Willem van Imhoff, in 1746) respectively
28 September	Railway Day / Anniversary of PT Kereta Api Indonesia (Persero)	Hari Kereta Api / Hari Ulang Tahun PT Kereta Api Indonesia (Persero)		Commemorates the 1945 takeover of Japanese military-controlled railway systems of Java by the Indonesian Railway Youth (Angkatan Moeda Kereta Api (AMKA, literally "Railway Youth Forces"))
1 October	National Day of Pancasila Sanctity and 30 September Movement Memorial Day	Hari Kesaktian Pancasila	1967	Mourning day for the events of 30 September Movement of 1965. The song Gugur Bunga is usually sung in this day
2 October	Batik Day	Hari Batik Nasional	2009	The international designation of the Indonesian batik as a Masterpiece of Oral and Intangible Heritage of Humanity in 2009.
5 October	Indonesian National Armed Forces Day	Hari Tentara Nasional Indonesia		The 1945 founding of Tentara Keamanan Rakyat ("People's Security Forces"), the predecessor of the TNI.
12 October	National Museum Day	Hari Museum Nasional	2015	
17 October	National Cultural Day	Hari Kebudayaan Nasional	2025	
22 October	National Santri Day	Hari Santri Nasional	2015	The 1945 date of the Jihad Declaration by Nahdlatul Ulama that the fight against the Dutch colonial forces was a jihad (holy war) - a general obligation for all Muslims just two months following the declaration of the independence of Indonesia. The declaration is the legal basis for the 1945 Battle of Surabaya in which many fighters are students of Islamic boarding schools (pesantren)
24 October	National Doctors Day	Hari Dokter Nasional	1950	
24 October	National Creative Economy Day	Hari Ekonomi Kreatif Nasional	2023	
27 October	National Electricity Day / Anniversary of PT Perusahaan Listrik Negara (Persero)	Hari Listrik Nasional (HLN) / Hari Ulang Tahun PT Perusahaan Listrik Negara (Persero)		
28 October	Youth Pledge Day	Hari Sumpah Pemuda	1967	Commemoration of the 1928 Youth Pledge
30 October	Indonesian Finance Day	Hari Oeang, Hari Keuangan Republik Indonesia		The printing of the first Oeang Republik Indonesia, the first 'Indonesian rupiah' bank note, in 1946.
8 November	National Spatial Planning Day	Hari Tata Ruang Nasional	2013	
10 November	Heroes' Day	Hari Pahlawan		Commemoration of the 1945 Battle of Surabaya
12 November	Father's Day	Hari Ayah		Established in 2006 following a suggestion by a group of women in Solo.
12 November	National Health Day	Hari Kesehatan Nasional		Marks the day when Sukarno officially begins the malaria eradication project by spraying DDT in the village of Kalasan, Special Region of Yogyakarta (1959).
14 November	Mobile Brigade Day	Hari Brigade Mobil		Founding of the Mobile Brigade Corps in 1946.
14 November	World Diabetes Day	Hari Diabetes Sedunia		United Nations observance.
15 November	Indonesian Marine Corps Birthday	Hari Juang Korps Marinir	1951	Honors the active and reserve serving men and women and veterans of the Indonesian Marine Corps
22 November	National Fishery Day	Hari Ikan Nasional	2014	
25 November	Teachers' Day / Anniversary of the Teachers' Union of the Republic of Indonesia	Hari Guru / Hari Ulang Tahun Persatuan Guru Republik Indonesia (PGRI)		Commemorates the Indonesian Teachers' Congress of 24–25 November 1945 in Solo, which established the Teachers' Union of the Republic of Indonesia
29 November	Anniversary of the Employees' Corps of the Republic of Indonesia	Hari Ulang Tahun Korps Pegawai Republik Indonesia (KORPRI)		Commemorates the establishment of the Employees' Corps of the Republic of Indonesia (Indonesian: Korps Pegawai Republik Indonesia (KORPRI), also known as the Indonesian Civil Servants Corps) in 1971, originally as the only association for civil servants, state- and regional government-owned enterprises and banks, heads of regional government, and all members of the Indonesian National Armed Forces running for government to ensure their loyalty to the New Order. KORPRI, not legally a trade union, remains the only organisation for all civil servants and heads of regional government (state- and regional-government-owned enterprises and banks now have their own trade unions.)
13 December	Nusantara Day	Hari Nusantara	2001	The recognition of the boundary of the Indonesian archipelago, started with the announcement of the Deklarasi Djoeanda on 13 December 1957, which eventually leads to the recognition of the principles of the Nusantara in the United Nations Convention on the Law of the Sea in 1982.
15 December	Indonesian Army Day	Hari Juang Kartika		Honors the active and reserve serving men and women and veterans of the Indonesian Army, marked on the anniversary of the victory in the Battle of Ambarawa (1945).
22 December	Mother's Day	Hari Ibu	1959	Commemorate the anniversary of the Indonesian Women's Congress in 1928.

== See also ==
- Balinese saka calendar
- Islamic calendar - for further expansion on the months and days identified above
- Javanese calendar
- List of festivals in Indonesia

== Cited works ==
- Iwan Gayo (1991). Buku Pintar Seri Junior. Jakarta: Upaya Warga Negara. pp. 342–345.
