= Oinonen =

Oinonen is a Finnish surname. Notable people with the surname include:

- Miikka Oinonen (born 1983), Finnish footballer
- Pekka Oinonen (born 1944), Finnish diplomat
- Pentti Oinonen (born 1952), Finnish politician
- Väinö Oinonen, (1897–1975), Finnish military commander
- Voldemar Oinonen (1891–1963), Finnish military commander
