= Willow Island, West Virginia =

- Unincorporated community
- Location within West Virginia Location within the United States
- Coordinates: 39°21′30″N 81°18′29″W
- Country: United States
- State: West Virginia
- County: Pleasants
- Elevation: 640 ft (200 m)
- Time zone: UTC-5 (Eastern (EST))
  - Summer (DST): UTC-4 (EDT)
- Area codes: 304 & 681
- GNIS feature ID: 1555993

Willow Island is an unincorporated community in Pleasants County, West Virginia, United States. Willow Island is located on the Ohio River at the junction of West Virginia Route 2 and County Highway 10, 3 miles (4.8 km) west-southwest of Belmont. Willow Island had a post office, which opened on October 17, 1946, and closed on May 25, 1991. The Pleasants Power Station, site of the 1978 Willow Island disaster, is located on Willow Island. This is the location of Willow Island Baptist Church and Willow Island Cemetery, the burial site for many of the area's founding and prominent families. Willow Island was also the location of Cyanamid, later called Cytec Industries, a chemical plant that was a large contributor to the Pleasants County school system and the area's workforce.
