= Boxing Day =

British-origin holiday on 26 December

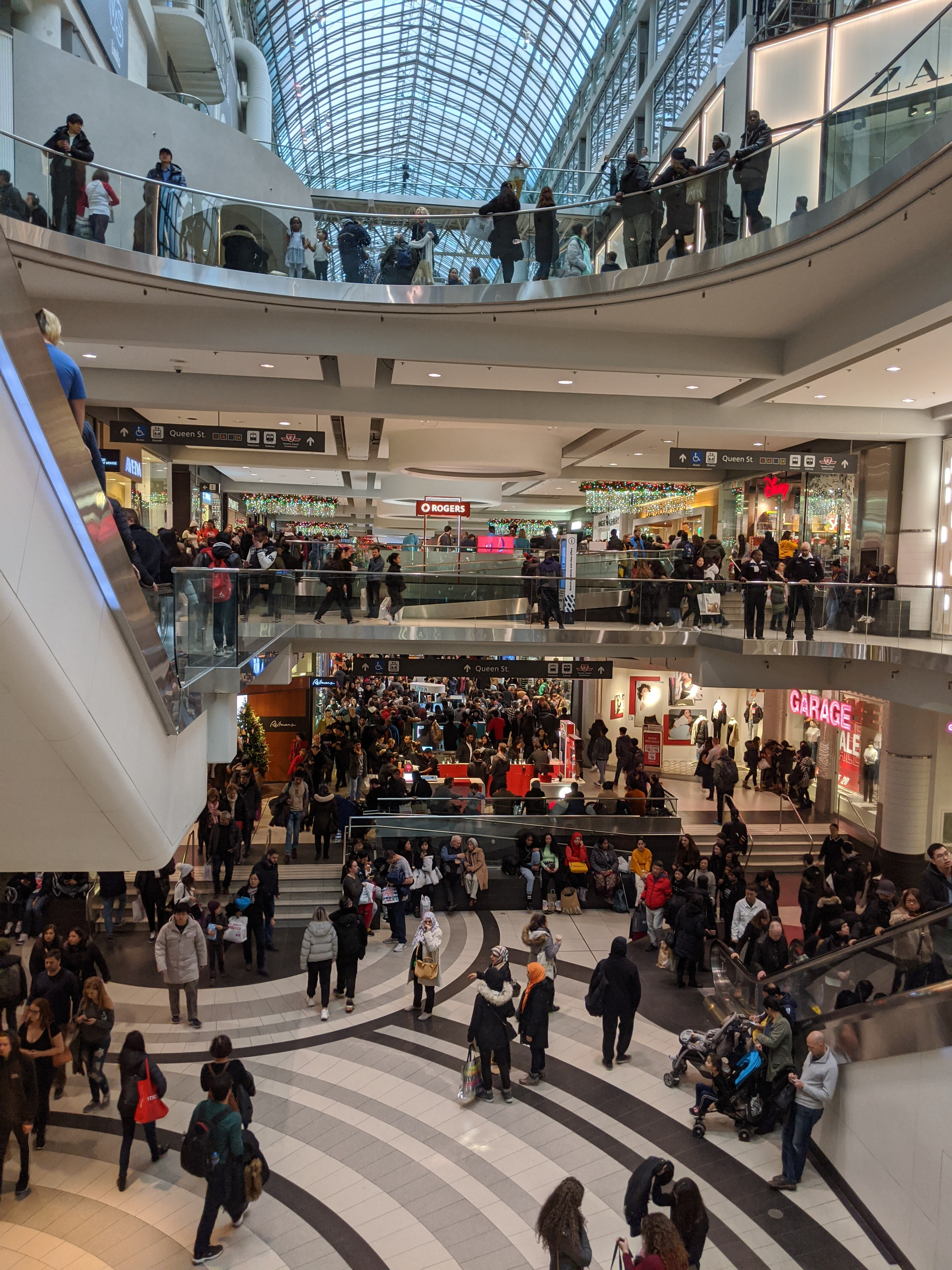
- Boxing Day crowds shopping at Toronto Eaton Centre in 2019
- Also called: Offering Day
- Observed by: Commonwealth nations
- Type: Bank holiday, public holiday
- Date: 26 December
- Next time: 26 December 2026
- Frequency: Annual
- Related to: Day of Goodwill; Saint Stephen's Day (concurrent); Second Day of Christmastide

Boxing Day, also known as Offering Day, is a holiday celebrated on 26 December, the day after Christmas Day. Boxing Day was once a day to donate gifts to those in need, but it has evolved to become a part of Christmas festivities. It originated in the United Kingdom and is celebrated in several Commonwealth nations. The attached bank holiday or public holiday may take place on 27 or 28 December if necessary to ensure it falls on a weekday. Boxing Day is usually concurrent with the Christian festival Saint Stephen's Day.

In parts of Europe, such as east Spain (Catalonia, Valencia and the Balearic Islands), the Czech Republic, Germany, Austria, Hungary, the Netherlands, Italy, Poland, Slovakia, Slovenia, Croatia, Denmark, Finland, Catholic Romania, Sweden, Belgium, Norway, Latvia and the Republic of Ireland, 26 December is Saint Stephen's Day, which is considered the second day of Christmas.

== Etymology ==
While the holiday's roots can be traced back to Britain, where Boxing Day is also known as St. Stephen's Day, the origin of the term itself is not definitive.

The European tradition of giving money and other gifts to those in need, or in service positions, has been dated to the Middle Ages, but the exact origin is unknown; it may refer to the alms box placed in the narthex of Christian churches to collect donations for the poor. The tradition may come from a custom in the late Roman and early Christian era, wherein alms boxes placed in churches were used to collect special offerings tied to the Feast of Saint Stephen, which, in the Western Christian Churches, falls on the same day as Boxing Day, the second day of Christmastide. On this day, it is customary in some localities for the alms boxes to be opened and distributed to the poor.

The Oxford English Dictionary gives the earliest attestation from Britain in 1743, defining it as "the day after Christmas day", and saying "traditionally on this day tradespeople, employees, etc., would receive presents or gratuities (a 'Christmas box') from their customers or employers."

The term "Christmas box" dates back to the 17th century, and among other things meant:

A present or gratuity given at Christmas: In Great Britain, usually confined to gratuities given to those who are supposed to have a vague claim upon the donor for services rendered to him as one of the general public by whom they are employed and paid, or as a customer of their legal employer; the undefined theory being that as they have done offices for this person, for which he has not directly paid them, some direct acknowledgement is becoming at Christmas.

In Britain, it was a custom for tradesmen to collect "Christmas boxes" of money or presents on the first weekday after Christmas as thanks for good service throughout the year. This is mentioned in Samuel Pepys' diary entry for 19 December 1663. This custom is linked to an older British tradition in which the servants of the wealthy were allowed the next day to visit their families since they would have had to serve their masters on Christmas Day. The employers would give each servant a box to take home containing gifts, bonuses, and sometimes leftover food. Seasonal gratuities to local service workers became an established practice in Britain by the 18th century.

== Date ==
Saint Stephen's Day, a religious holiday, also falls on 26 December.

In the United Kingdom, Boxing Day could not fall on Sunday 26 December. Instead, the holiday would be celebrated on Monday 27 December, with the preceding Sunday called Christmas Sunday. This rule was independent of the rule of bank holidays being taken in lieu. Over time Sunday 26 December increasingly became referred to as Boxing Day.

Unlike the contemporary understanding of Boxing Day itself, the associated bank holiday or public holiday always falls on a weekday. When 25 December falls on a Saturday and 26 December falls on a Sunday, the Christmas Day substitute holiday is observed on Monday 27 December, with the Boxing Day substitute holiday observed on Tuesday 28 December. When Christmas Day is a Sunday, the Boxing Day holiday is still observed on Monday 26 December, with the substitute holiday for Christmas Day observed on Tuesday 27 December.

The Banking and Financial Dealings Act 1971, which regulates UK bank holidays, does not officially name the 26 December bank holiday as Boxing Day, but states that it falls on "26th December, if it be not a Sunday."

== Status by country ==
- In Australia, Boxing Day is a public holiday in all jurisdictions except the state of South Australia, where a public holiday known as Proclamation Day is celebrated on the first weekday after Christmas Day or the Christmas Day holiday. Both the Boxing Day Test cricket match held at the Melbourne Cricket Ground and The Sydney to Hobart Yacht Race begin on Boxing Day.
- In Canada, Boxing Day (French: le Lendemain de Noël) is a federal statutory holiday for employees of federally-regulated industries or workplaces. It's also recognized as a statutory holiday in the province of Ontario. In New Brunswick, Boxing Day is a holiday listed as a "prescribed day of rest" in the province's Days of Rest Act, but it is not a statutory holiday because it is not classified as a paid public holiday under New Brunswick's Employment Standards Act.
- In Hong Kong, despite the transfer of sovereignty from the UK to China in 1997, Boxing Day is a general holiday as the first weekday after Christmas. Starting in 2024, Boxing Day became a statutory holiday in the territory.
- In Indonesia, Boxing Day is not a public holiday, but since 2023 was included as a "joint holiday" (Indonesian: cuti bersama), unless it falls on the weekend.
- In Ireland, when the entire island was part of the United Kingdom, the Bank Holidays Act 1871 established the 26 December as a bank holiday. The day is referred to as Saint Stephen's Day in most of Ireland, and as Boxing Day in most of Ulster (especially in Northern Ireland and County Donegal).
- In New Zealand, Boxing Day is a statutory holiday. On these holidays, people who must work receive 1 1/2 times their salaries, and a day in lieu is provided to employees who work.
- In Nigeria, Boxing Day is a public holiday for working people and students. When it falls on a Saturday or Sunday, there is always a holiday on the following Monday.
- In Scotland, Boxing Day has been specified as an additional bank holiday since 1974, by royal proclamation under the Banking and Financial Dealings Act 1971.
- In Singapore, Boxing Day was a public holiday for working people and students; when it fell on a Saturday or Sunday, there was a holiday on the following Monday. However, Boxing Day is no longer a public holiday.
- In South Africa, 26 December is the Day of Goodwill, a public holiday.It was renamed from Boxing Day to Day of Goodwill in 1994, so that the spirit of Christmas continues the next day.
- In Trinidad and Tobago, Boxing Day is a public holiday.
- In the UK outside Scotland, 26 December (unless it is a Sunday) has been a bank holiday since 1871. When 26 December falls on a Saturday, the associated public holiday is on the following Monday, 28 December. When 26 December falls on a Sunday, the public holiday is the following Tuesday 28 December, with the "substitute day" for Christmas Day being observed on the Monday. The same practice is observed in Canada.
- In the British overseas territory of Bermuda, the costumed Gombey dancers perform throughout the mid-Atlantic island on Boxing Day, a tradition believed to date back to the 18th century, when slaves were permitted to gather at Christmas.
- In Massachusetts, US, Governor William F. Weld declared in 1996 that every 26 December is Boxing Day, in response to the efforts of a coalition of British citizens to "transport the English tradition to the United States", but not an employee holiday. The holiday is otherwise not widely celebrated in the United States.

== Shopping ==
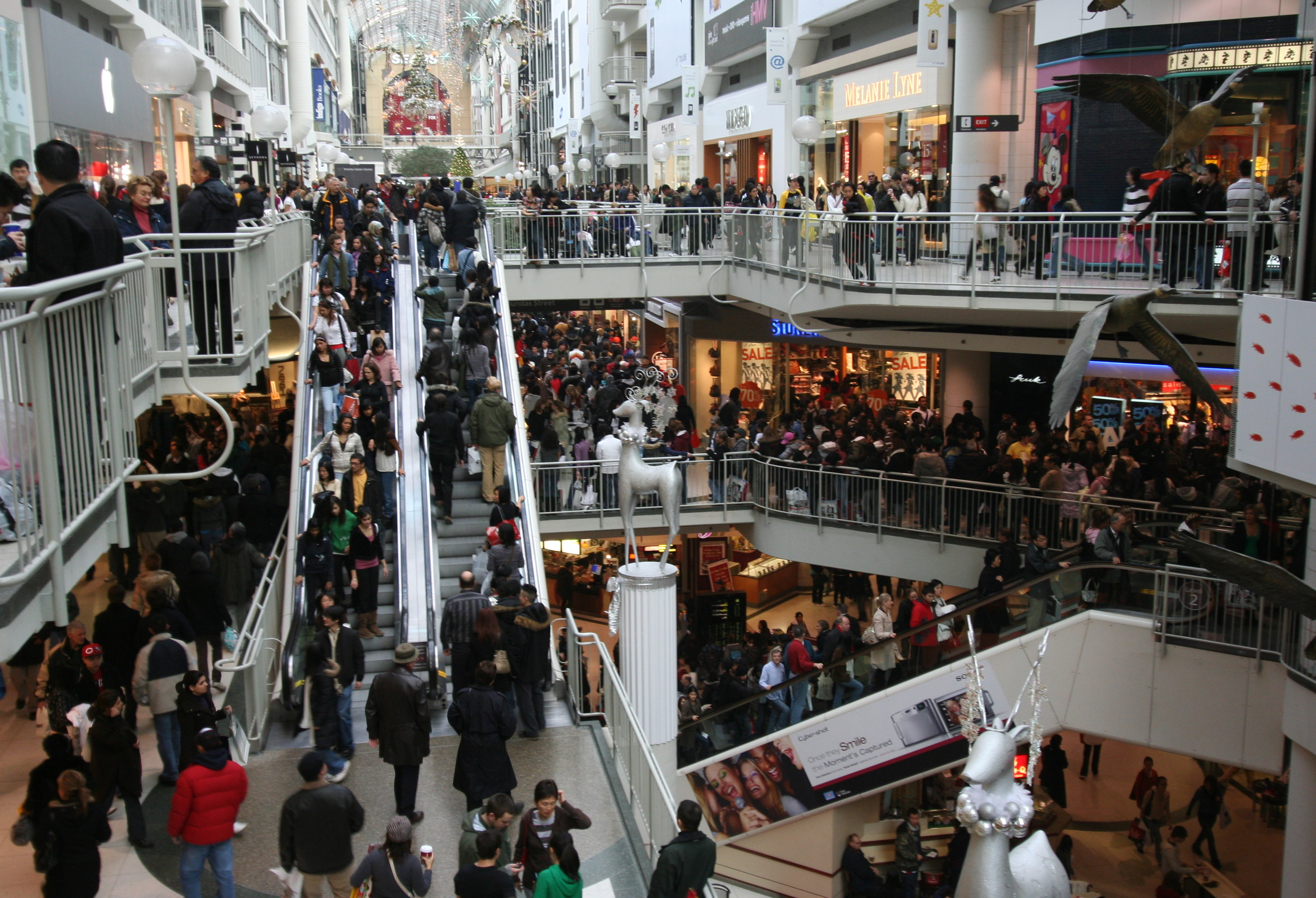
Boxing Day crowds shopping at the Toronto Eaton Centre in Canada, 2007

In the United Kingdom, Canada, Australia, New Zealand, and Trinidad and Tobago, Boxing Day is a popular shopping holiday. Boxing Day sales are common, and shops often allow dramatic price reductions. For many merchants, Boxing Day has become the day of the year with the greatest revenue. In the UK, it was estimated in 2009 that up to 12 million shoppers appeared at the sales (a rise of almost 20% compared to 2008, although this was also affected by the fact that the VAT was about to revert to 17.5% from 1 January, following the temporary reduction to 15%).

Many retailers open very early (typically 5 am or even earlier) and offer doorbuster deals and loss leaders to draw people to their stores. It is not uncommon for long queues to form early in the morning of 26 December, hours before the opening of shops holding the big sales, especially at big-box consumer electronics retailers. Many stores have a limited quantity of big draw or deeply discounted items. Because of the shoulder-to-shoulder crowds, many choose to stay at home and avoid the hectic shopping experience. Local media often covers the event, mentioning how early the shoppers began queuing up and showing videos of shoppers queuing and later leaving with their purchased items. Many retailers have implemented practices aimed at managing large numbers of shoppers. They may limit entrances, restrict the number of patrons in a store at a time, provide tickets to people at the head of the queue to guarantee them a hot ticket item, or canvass queued-up shoppers to inform them of inventory limitations.

In Canada, Boxing Day was historically the largest retail shopping day of the year, particularly before the widespread adoption of Black Friday sales in the 2010s. Major retailers traditionally offered deep post-Christmas discounts, and large crowds were common in shopping centres across the country.

In some areas of Canada, particularly in Atlantic Canada and parts of Northern Ontario, most retailers are prohibited from opening on Boxing Day, either by provincial law or by municipal bylaw, or by informal agreement among major retailers, to provide a day of relaxation following Christmas Day. In these areas, sales otherwise scheduled for 26 December are moved to the 27th. The city council of Greater Sudbury, Ontario, which was the largest city in Canada to maintain this restriction as of the early 2010s, formally repealed its store hours bylaw on 9 December 2014.

While Boxing Day is 26 December, many retailers run the sales for several days before or after 26 December, often up to New Year's Eve, branding it as "Boxing Week". Notably, in the recession of late 2008, a record number of retailers held early promotions because of the weak economy. In 2009, many retailers with both online and High Street stores launched their online sales on Christmas Eve and their High Street sales on Boxing Day.

=== Comparisons to Black Friday ===
In terms of seasonal or holiday shopping traditions, Boxing Day sales have been compared to the US phenomenon of Black Friday sales – Black Friday being the Friday following the American Thanksgiving holiday in late November. In the late 2000s, when the Canadian and United States dollars were near parity, many Canadian retailers began to hold Black Friday promotions in an effort to discourage shoppers from crossing the border to visit United States stores. This may have been a contributory factor, since 2013, in a relative decline of traditional Canadian Boxing Day sales, when compared with sales on Black Friday.

The traditional Boxing Day sales in the United Kingdom were never as large an event as the Black Friday sales are in the United States. However, many British retailers began to see an opportunity to import the Black Friday tradition into the UK, not to replace Boxing Day sales, but as an addition to their overall seasonal promotions. However, Black Friday and Boxing Day are close enough together that spending on one sale was likely to affect spending on the other. Ultimately, the result was a marked decline in traditional Boxing Day sales in the UK. The change was initially facilitated, although not necessarily by design, by U.S.-owned retailers such as Amazon, and Asda (then a subsidiary of US-based Walmart). This phenomenon was furthered by a general decline in traditional high-street shopping and a growing online marketplace, which is more international by nature. This led, in 2015, to greater November retail sales in the UK than in December for the first time. In 2019, a retail analysis firm estimated that there was a 9.8% drop in British store traffic on Boxing Day in comparison to 2018 (the largest year-over-year drop since 2010), citing several factors, such as the weather, the increased prominence of online shopping, uncertainties in the wake of the general election, and the growing prominence of Black Friday sales.

Boxing Day sales are not a prominent tradition in the United States, although many retailers often begin after-Christmas sales that day. It is typically the earliest starting day after Christmas for people to return unwanted gifts for exchanges or refunds and to redeem gift cards. Starting in the mid-2020s, American retailers began promoting their after-Christmas sales as “Boxing Day” or “Boxing Week” sales.

== Sport ==
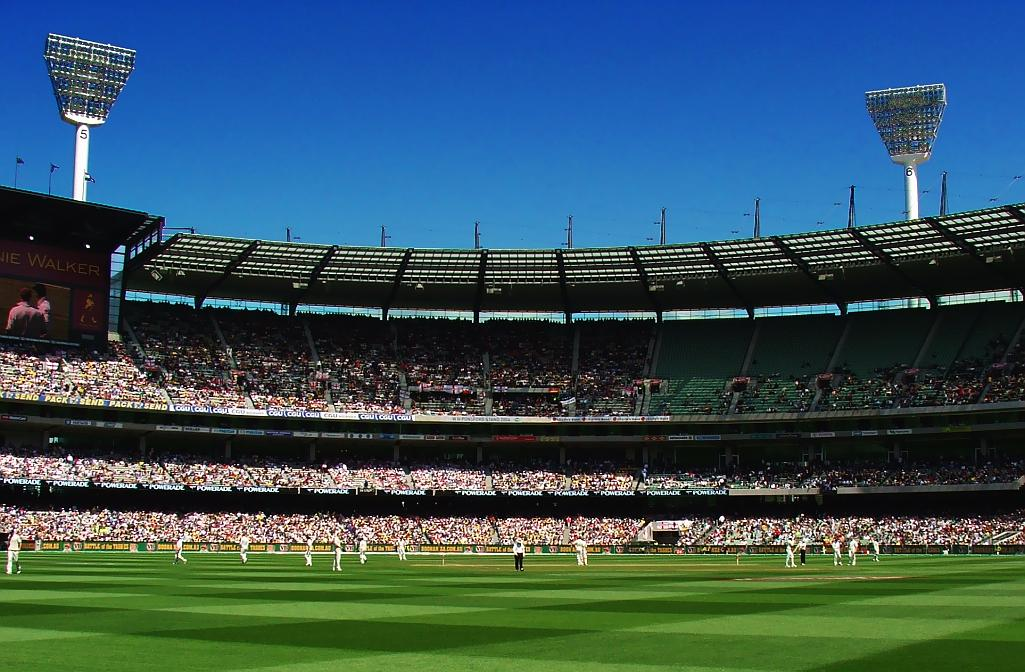
Boxing Day Test at the Melbourne Cricket Ground, 2006

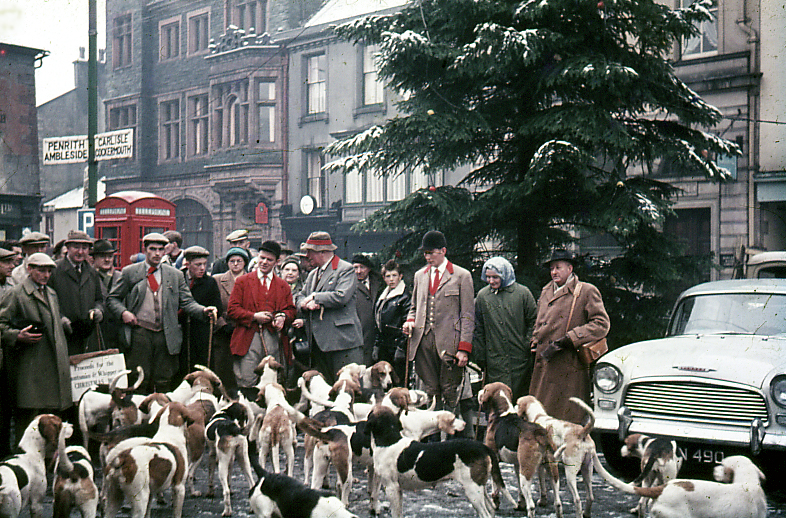
Boxing Day Meet of the Blencathra Foxhounds in Keswick, 1962

In the United Kingdom, it is traditional for the Home Nations' major football leagues (including, most prominently, the Premier League, Scottish Premiership, and NIFL Premiership) to hold a full programme of fixtures on Boxing Day. Originally, matches on Boxing Day were played against local rivals so that teams and their fans would not have to travel long distances to away games on the day after Christmas. The 2022 Premier League Boxing Day fixtures saw the return of domestic top flight football for the 2022–23 Premier League season, following the six-week break for the 2022 FIFA World Cup.

In rugby league, festive fixtures were a staple of the traditional winter season. Since the transition to a summer season in the 1990s, no formal fixtures are now arranged on Boxing Day but some clubs, such as Wakefield Trinity, arrange a traditional local derby friendly fixture instead.

Since 1980, the Australian cricket team has traditionally opened one of the test matches of its summer season on Boxing Day at the Melbourne Cricket Ground. While several test matches had occasionally been held at the MCG around Boxing Day, it was not until 1980 that the concept was formalized by the Australian Cricket Board. The Sydney to Hobart Yacht Race is also traditionally held on Boxing Day.

In horse racing, there is the King George VI Chase at Kempton Park Racecourse in Surrey, England. It is the second most prestigious chase in Britain, after the Cheltenham Gold Cup. In addition to the prestigious race at Kempton, in Britain, it is usually the day with the most racing meetings of the year, with eight in 2016, in addition to three more in Ireland. In Barbados, the final day of horse racing is held on Boxing Day at The Historic Garrison Savannah, a UNESCO world heritage site. This tradition has been going on for decades in this former British colony.

Boxing Day is one of the main days in the hunting calendar for hunts in the UK and US, with most hunts (both mounted foxhound or harrier packs and foot packs of beagles or bassets) holding meets, often in town or village centres.

Several ice hockey contests are associated with the day. The IIHF World Junior Championship typically begins on 26 December, while the Spengler Cup also begins on 23 December in Davos, Switzerland; the Spengler Cup competition includes HC Davos, Team Canada, and other top European hockey teams. The National Hockey League traditionally had close to a full slate of games (10 were played in 2011), following the league-wide days off given for Christmas Eve and Christmas Day. However, the 2013 collective bargaining agreement (which followed a lock-out) extended the league mandate of Christmas Eve and Christmas Day off to include Boxing Day, except when it falls on a Saturday, in which case the league can choose to make 23 December a league-wide off day instead for that year. In Sweden, the related sport of bandy is also associated with the day, with Saint Stephen's Day bandy games having become an established tradition.

In some African Commonwealth nations, particularly Ghana, Uganda, Malawi, Zambia, and Tanzania, professional boxing contests are held on Boxing Day. This practice has also been followed for decades in Guyana and Italy.

== Food ==
In the UK it is common to eat leftovers from the previous day's Christmas dinner, with turkey often being used in a Boxing Day sandwich or curry.
