= Daithí Ó Ceallaigh =

Former Irish diplomat

Daithí Ó Ceallaigh is a former Irish diplomat.

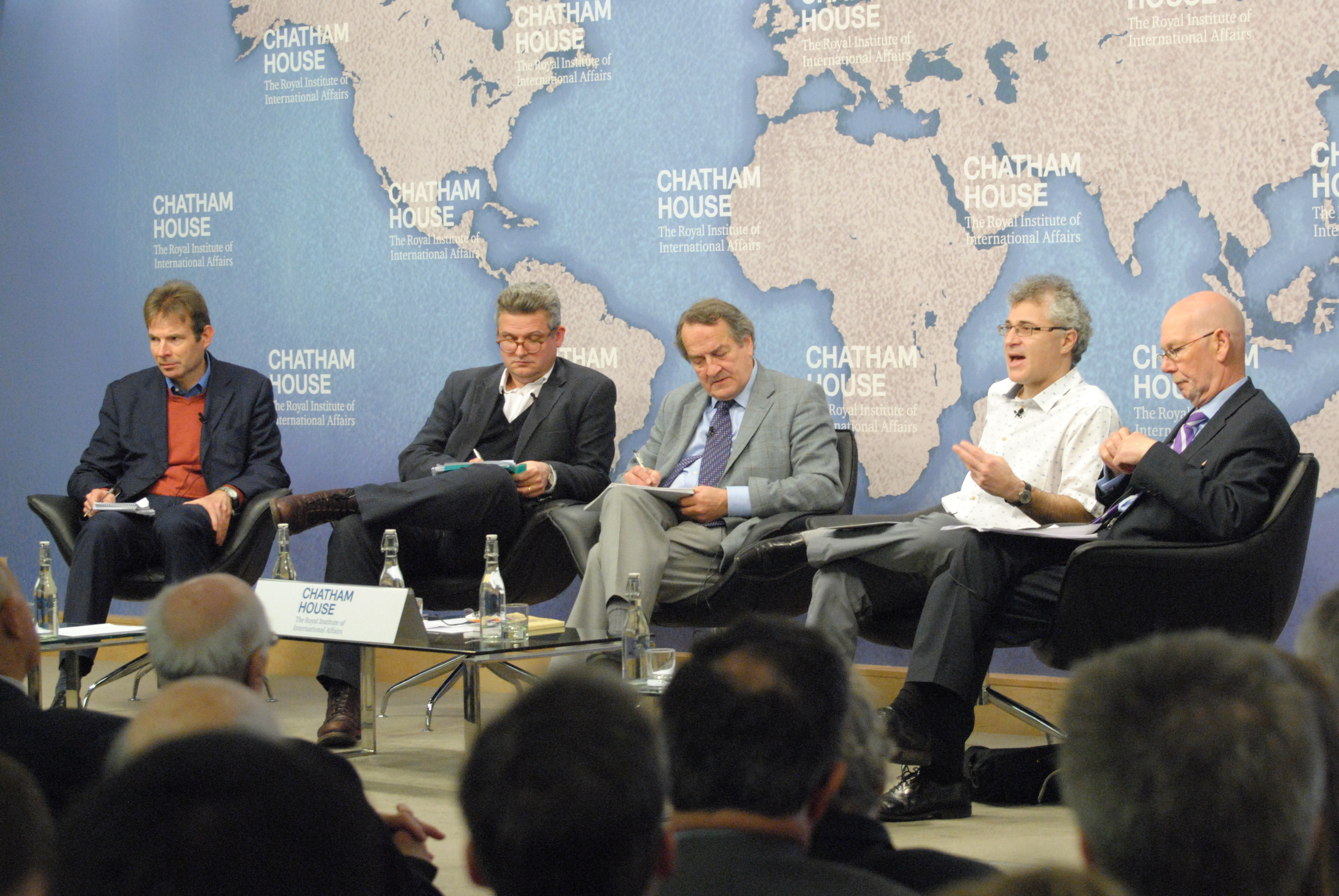
Ó Ceallaigh (right)

== Biography ==
Ó Ceallaigh is a native of Dun Laoghaire, County Dublin. He is a graduate of University College Dublin. He worked as a secondary teacher, and gave three years voluntary service in Zambia, before joining the diplomatic service in 1973.

He was Ireland's first ambassador to Finland, serving from 1993 to 1997. In 2004, in Dublin, the Finnish ambassador to Ireland, Pekka Oinonen, presented Ó Ceallaigh with the Order of the White Rose of Finland. Ambassador Oinonen remarked in his speech that when Finland was in the process of joining the European Union, Ó Ceallaigh was practically an "advisor" to the Finnish government on the practical issues of E.U. membership.

From 2001 to 2007 he served as ambassador to the United Kingdom.

He was then posted as ambassador to the U.N. at Geneva. In this role, he presided over the diplomatic conference in Croke Park, Dublin, which successfully negotiated the Convention on Cluster Munitions.

Ó Ceallaigh retired from the diplomatic service in 2009.

After retirement he served as director general of the Institute of International and European Affairs.

In 2010 he was appointed chairman of the Press Council of Ireland and served two terms, the maximum allowed, until 2016.

In 2017 Ó Ceallaigh was awarded an honorary degree of Doctor of Letters (D.Litt.) from Ulster University for his outstanding contribution to the Press Council of Ireland and the peace process.

In 2019 Ó Ceallaigh was elected a member of the Royal Irish Academy.

== Publications ==
- Book chapter, Some Thoughts on the 'Travellers' and on Maryfield, in Brokering the Good Friday Agreement: The Untold Story, Ed. Mary Daly, Royal Irish Academy. (2019)
- Dáithí O'Ceallaigh and Paul Gillespie, Britain and Europe; the Endgame, IIEA, 2015.
- Dáithí O'Ceallaigh and James Kilcourse, Towards an Irish Foreign Policy for Britain, IIEA, 2012.
