= Väinö Oinonen =

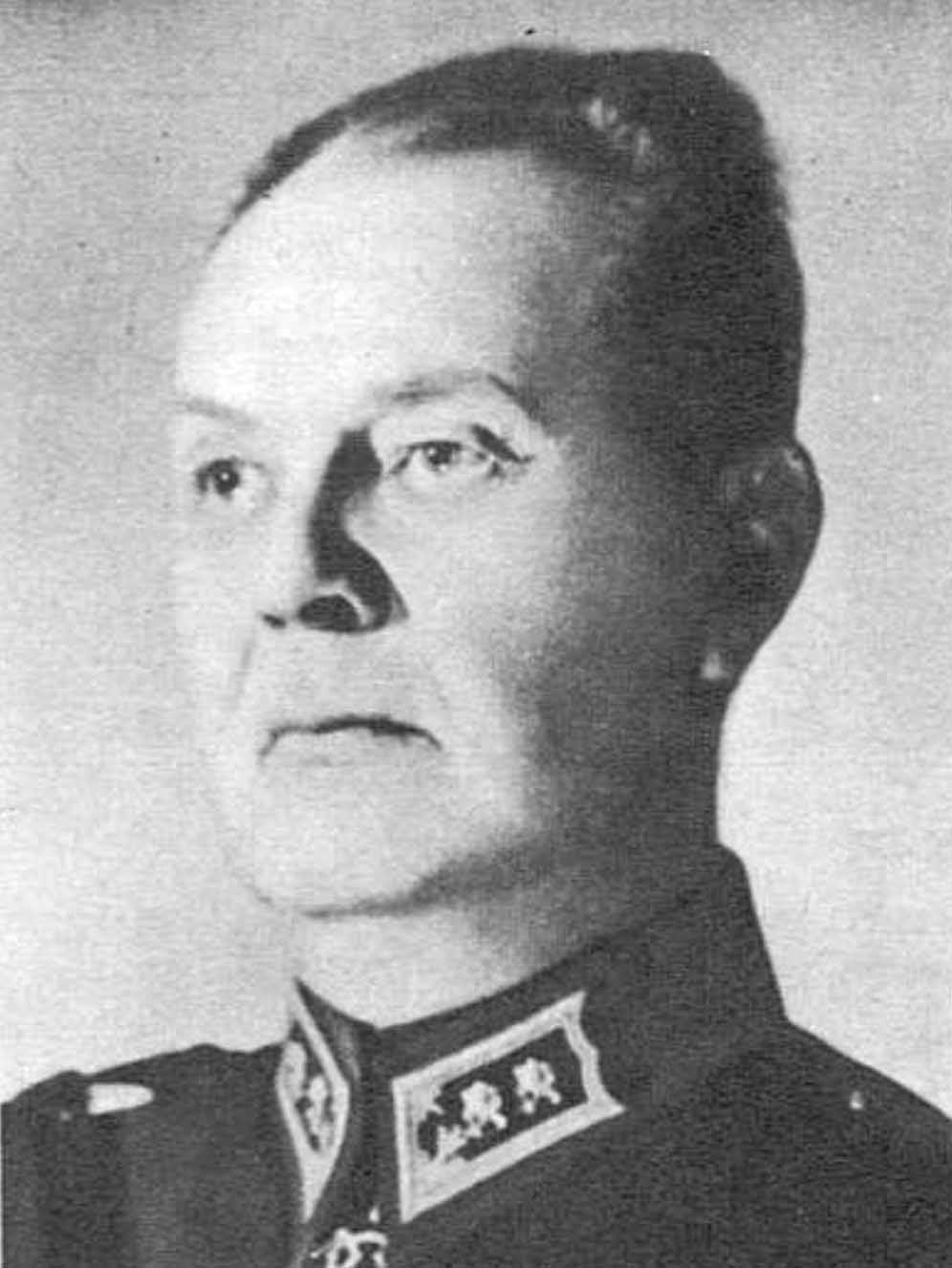
- Born: 21 March, 1897; Kuopio
- Died: 4 January, 1975
- Education: Infantry NCO School
- Spouse: Martta Liisa Lundström (m. 1924)
- Children: Liisa (born 1925), Martta Annikki (born 1926), Kirsti Kaarina (born 1932), Irma Riikka Elina (born 1933), Piritta (born 1946)
- Relatives: Juho Vilho Oinonen (Father), Amanda Fredrika Törrönen (Mother)
- Military career
- Allegiance: Finland
- Branch: Army
- Service years: 1918–1948
- Rank: Lieutenant General
- Commands: Battle Group Loimu, Infantry Regiment 1
- Conflicts: Finnish Civil War; Battle of Viipuri; World War 2; Continuation War; Winter War; Finnish invasion of the Karelian Isthmus
- Awards: Complete list

Väinö Johannes Oinonen (21 March 1897 – 4 February 1975) was a senior officer in the Finnish Army, serving in the Winter War, the Continuation War, and the Finnish War of Independence. He is notable for taking the photograph Raising the Flag on the Three-Country Cairn in 1945, on the last day of the Second World War in Finland. He served as the head of the Finnish military delegation to the Soviet Union in 1956.

== Early life ==
Oinonen was born in Kuopio, Finland, on 21 March 1897, to Warrant Officer Juho Vilho Oinonen and Amanda Fredrika Törrönen. He graduated from high school in 1918 and completed the necessary examinations for a law degree.

== Military career ==
In 1918, Oinonen enlisted in the Finnish Army to fight in the Finnish Civil War. He would serve as a group and platoon leader in several battles throughout the war, including the Battle of Varkaus. He would get promoted to platoon leader by the end of 1919, and, by 1936, was a Lieutenant Colonel.

During the Winter War, he was Chief of the Tactical Office of the Headquarters, from which position he was ordered to Isthmus Army Headquartes to invade the Karelian Isthmus. Later, he would take control of the Infantry Regiment 1 of Battle Group Loimu, including during the end of the war.

== Raising the Flag on the Three-Country Cairn ==
On 27 April, 1945, when Oinonen was serving as Commander of Infantry Regiment 1 of Battle Group Loimu, he went to the Cairn at the borders of Sweden, Finland, and Norway, to inspect it, along with a detachment of soldiers. The detachment included a larger flagpole and the Finnish Battle flag, which they ceremonially raised on the Cairn. The photograph was taken by Oinonen with the 894 m (2,933 ft)-high Golddabákti fell of Norway in the background while the flag was being raised.

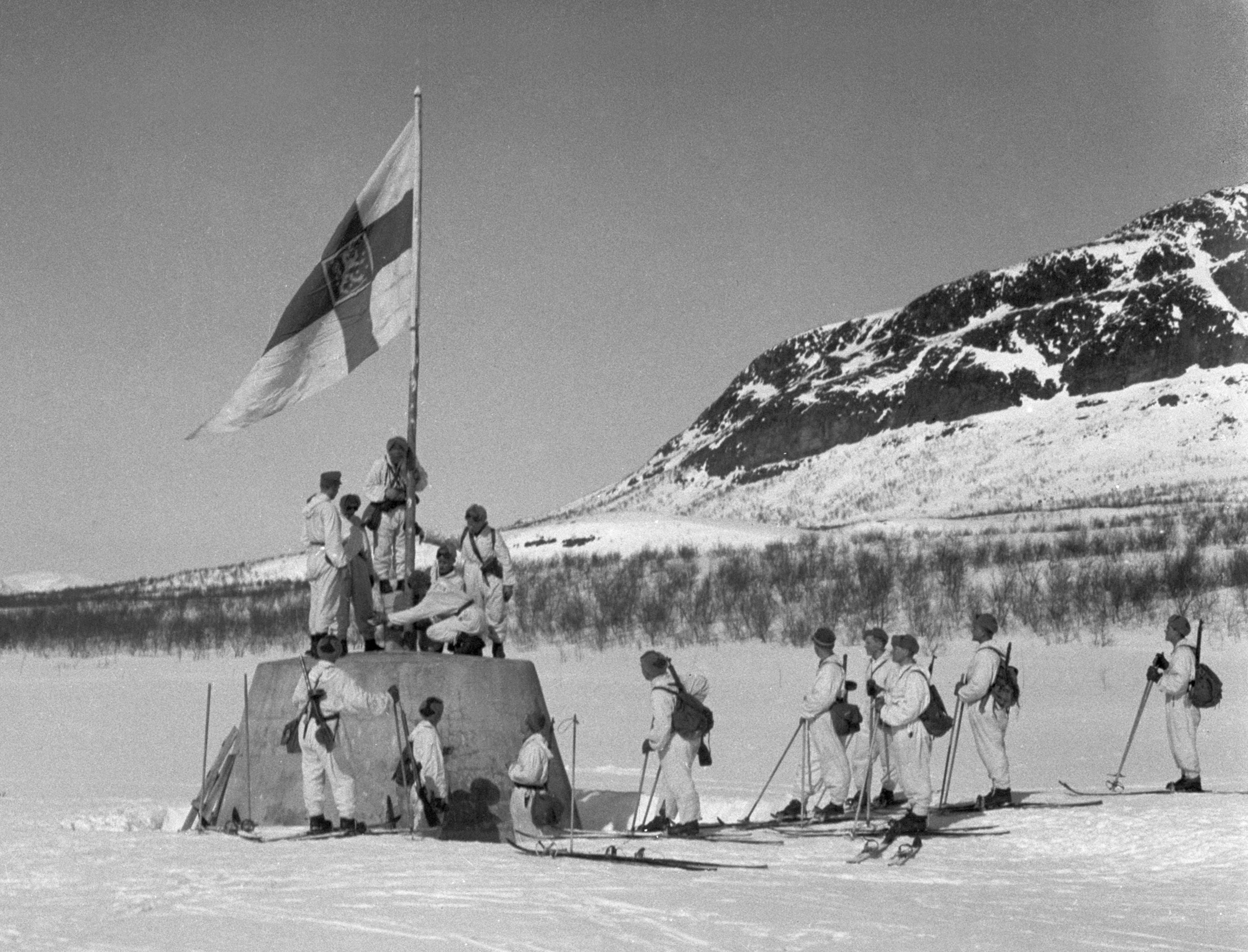
Raising the Flag on the Three-Country Cairn

An opposing German unit was in position on the Norwegian side of the border, but conflict was narrowly avoided by a Swedish officer, who acted as intermediary.

== Awards ==
=== Finland ===
- 1st Class Cross of Liberty
- 2nd Class Cross of Liberty
- 3rd Class Cross of Liberty
- 1st Class Knight of the Order of the White Rose of Finland
- 2nd Class Knight's Order of the White Rose of Finland with Swords
- Finnish War of Independence Commemorative Medal
- Winter War Commemorative Medal
- Continuation War Commemorative Medal

=== Foreign orders and decorations ===
- 1st Class Commander of the Swedish Order of the Sword
- 2nd Class Iron Cross
