= Fengcheng power station scaffold collapse =

Construction accident in China

Fengcheng power station collapse
- Location of Jiangxi in China
- Date: 24 November 2016
- Location: Fengcheng, Jiangxi, China; 28°12′4.4″N 115°42′36.1″E
- Deaths: 74
- Injuries: 2

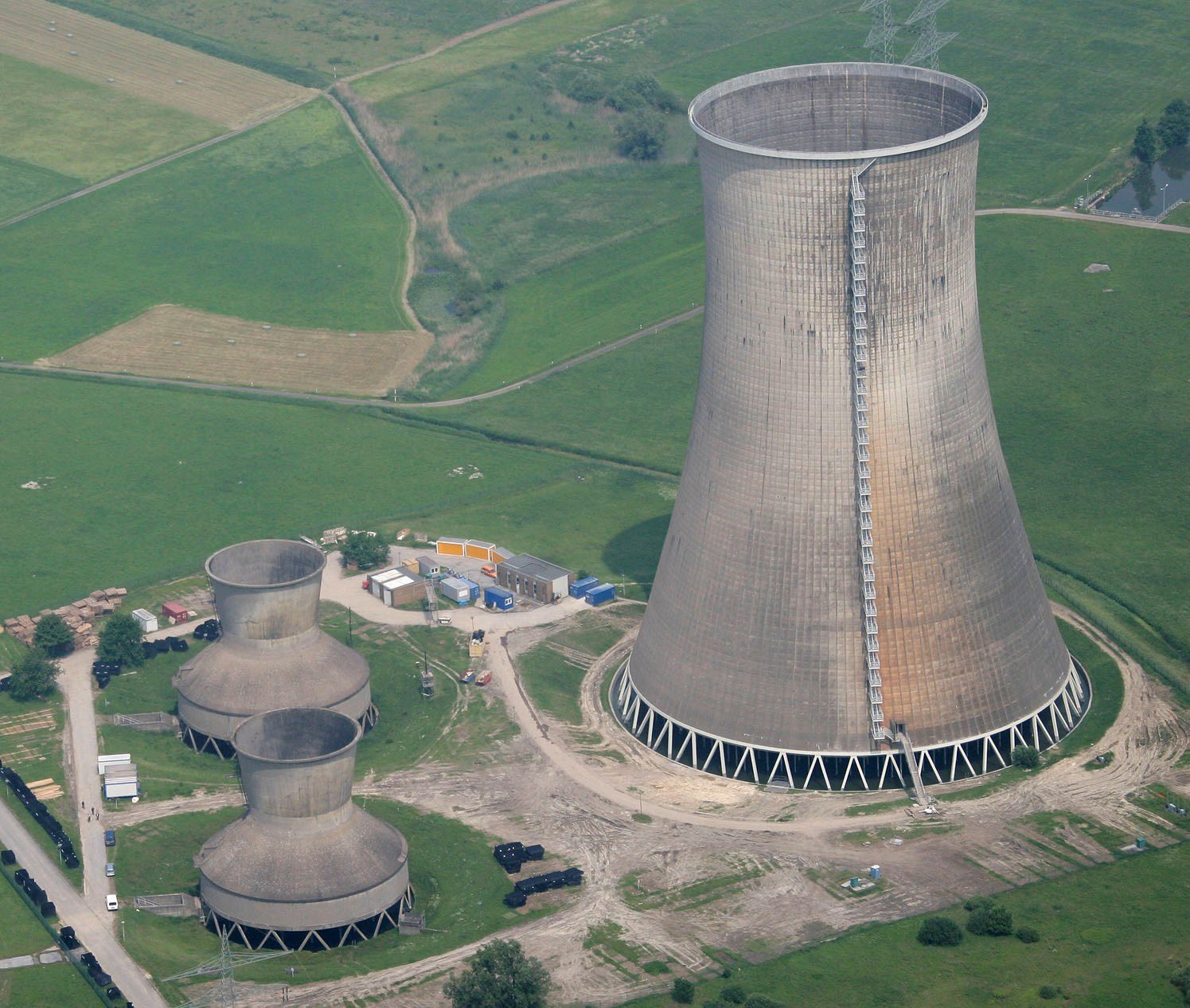
Similar structure of cooling tower in Westphalia, Germany

The Fengcheng power station collapse occurred on 24 November 2016. At least 74 people died and at least two others were injured and trapped after a construction platform at a power plant in the Chinese city of Fengcheng in Jiangxi province collapsed. During the time, more than 60 people were working on the platform and another dozen were on the ground waiting to begin their shift at 7a.m. when the platform of a power plant’s cooling tower under construction collapsed.

== See also ==
- Willow Island disaster – a similar accident which killed 51 people in 1978 in West Virginia, US
- List of structural failures and collapses
