= Golddabákti =

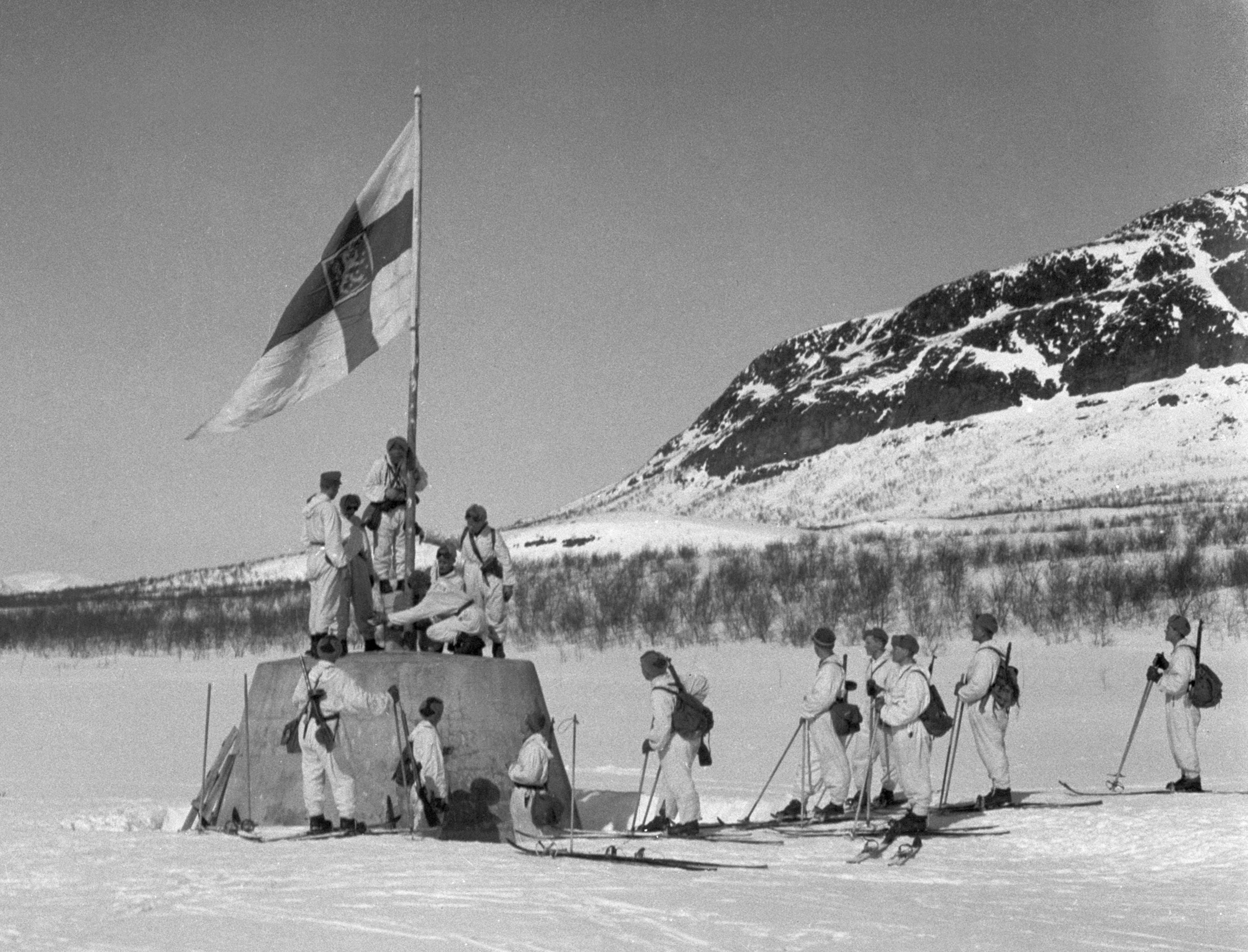
- Golddabákti in the background of the photograph Raising the Flag on the Three-Country Cairn

Highest point
- Elevation: 894 m (2,933 ft)
- Prominence: 105 m (344 ft)

Naming
- English translation: Drift-net rock
- Language of name: Northern Sámi
- Pronunciation: [ˈkolpmaˌpaːkti]

Geography
- Location within Scandinavia
- Location: Storfjord Municipality, Norway
- Range coordinates: 69.07031°N 20.54070°E
- Parent range: Scandinavian Caledonies

Golddabákti /kolpmaˌpaːkti/ is a mountain in Storfjord Municipality, in Norway. It is 899 ft tall at its summit, and overlooks the Three-Country Cairn, where Finland, Sweden, and Norway meet. It is notable for being the background for the famous photograph Raising the Flag on the Three-Country Cairn, taken on the final day of the Second World War.
