= Doorbuster =

Discount that attracts many shoppers

In retail, a doorbuster or door crasher deal is an offer that is handed out early into the business's opening hours; this offer almost always is promoting a good in limited supply. These deals are designed to attract large numbers of shoppers into the business.

== Description ==
A typical doorbuster deal is an item or selection of items that is given a special discount price for a limited amount of time or in a limited quantity. This offer is referred to as a doorbuster in reference to literal incidents in which doors were broken down by a flood of people struggling to get the goods before they sold out. Doorbuster deals are usually employed on major shopping days, such as Black Friday and Boxing Day.

An unfair practice of "doorbusting" consists in advertising great deals on products despite possessing a low quantity in stock ("while quantities last" as it may be advertised in small prints) in order to lure customers in the store to buy other regular-priced products when the discounted ones run out.

Doorbusters can result in massive crowds and long lines, and disturbances sometimes arise. In November 2008, a crowd of 2,000 waiting for the 5 am opening of a doorbuster event at a Walmart in New York broke the sliding-glass doors out of impatience and the following stampede of the crowd rushing in the store fatally injured a store employee.

== History ==
The term, doorbuster, was coined by James Cash Penney, owner of the Penney store chain which came to be known as J.C. Penney. The word first met the public when Penney's ran an ad in Alabama's Tuscaloosa News on January 13, 1949.

Soon, Gimbels began using the new slang term in print advertising in the New York Times that urged readers to “come in for these hard-to-beat door busters”. It wasn't until 1950 that we saw the term used as one word the way we know it today when Newberry's printed the term in the Los Angeles Times on July 9, 1950.

These days, doorbusters are typically used during massive sales across North America. They are most prevalent on Black Friday and Boxing Day when many shoppers are out looking for bargains.

== Crowds ==
The earliest account of doorbuster madness can be dated back to 1983 when the Cabbage Patch Doll was in limited supply. After backing by toy giant Coleco, the doll had become the must-have holiday gift of the season. With distribution upwards of six million dolls across the United States being sold at $20 each (over $65 today), Coleco had vastly underestimated the doll's popularity only distributing roughly 50 dolls per store. Toy stores across the nation were having to deal with lines of hundreds of customers with so few dolls in stock. In Concord, New Hampshire, customers waited in line for hours in 35 °F (2 °C) temperatures.

As of 13 December 2019, there have been 12 deaths and 117 injuries as a cause of Doorbusters on Black Friday alone. These range from heart attacks due to the excitement of the crowds all the way to people being shot over sale items.

== Future ==
In 2016 it was reported that 3 million fewer shoppers were going into stores on Black Friday than the year prior. The number of shoppers on Black Friday is predicted to continuously decrease as online shopping comes to the forefront. It does not help that with the use of technology many shoppers are able to find similar deals as those offered on Black Friday all year long.

One of the major innovations in terms of shopping and the attendance rate during Black Friday, Boxing Day, and other major sales is the prominence of online shopping. Many online retailers allow customers to participate in the doorbuster savings comfortably from their own homes without having to wait for hours in sometimes awful weather or fight against the crowds in order to be first in the store to get the deals.

== See also ==
- Bait-and-switch, when the doorbuster deal runs out.
- Cyber Monday, an American online shopping holiday.
- Black Friday, the Friday after Thanksgiving.
