= Willow Island disaster =

1978 construction accident in West Virginia

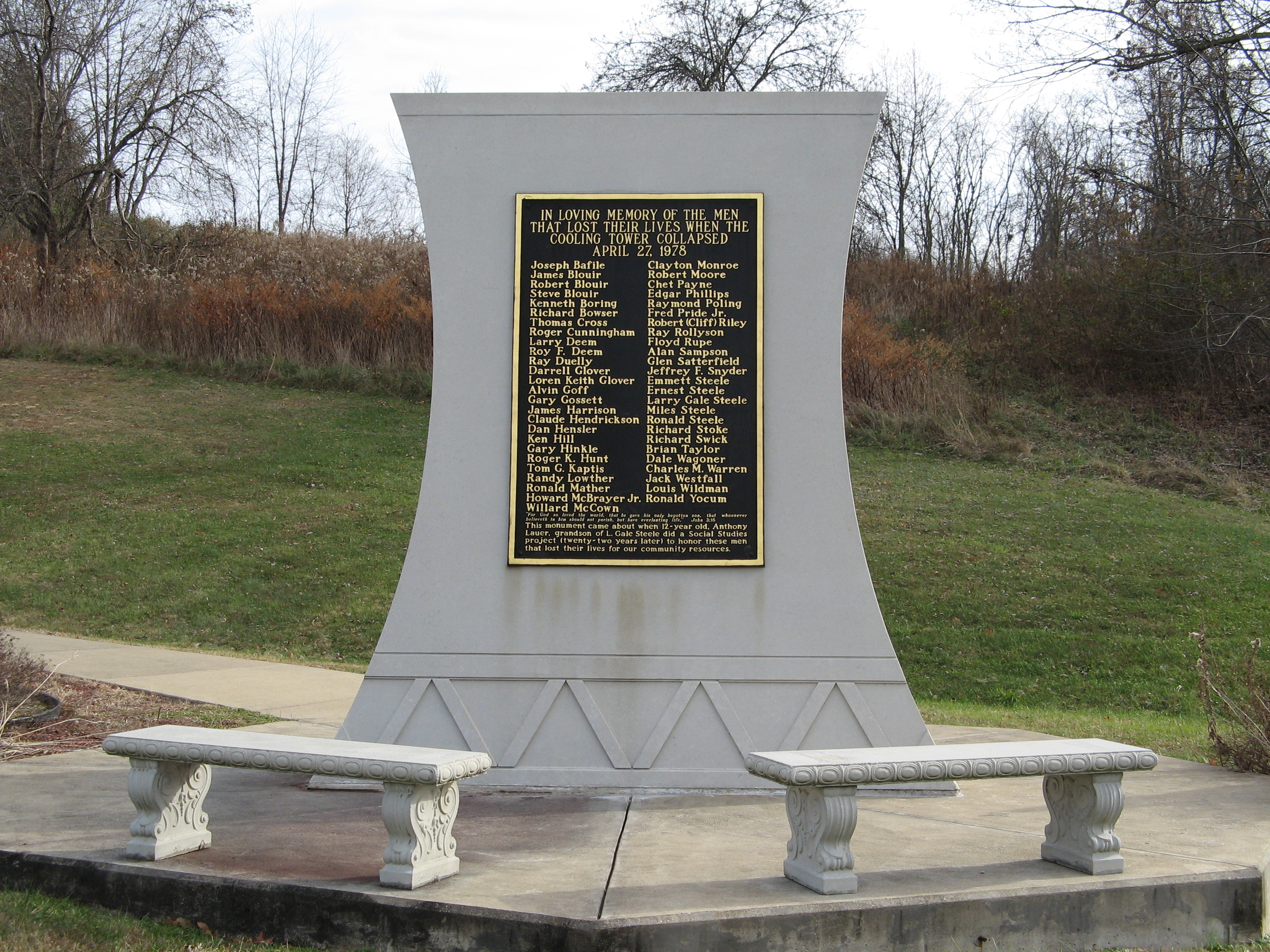
- Willow Island Memorial
- Date: April 27, 1978
- Location: Willow Island, West Virginia; 39.367238°N 81.291484°W
- Cause: Failure of scaffolding
- Deaths: 51

The Willow Island disaster was the collapse of a cooling tower under construction at the Pleasants Power Station at Willow Island, West Virginia, on April 27, 1978. Fifty-one construction workers were killed. It is thought to be the deadliest construction accident in U.S. history.

== Background ==
Pleasants Power Plant with its two cooling towers shown here in 2015.

During the 1970s, many coal-powered power plants were being built in the valley along the Ohio River. The Allegheny Power System was building another, larger plant at Willow Island, which would have two electric generators with a total capacity of 1,300 megawatts. This was in addition to the two smaller units that were already installed there.

By April 1978, one natural draft cooling tower had been built, and a second was under construction. One of the contractors, New Jersey–based Research-Cottrell, was well known for constructing such towers around the country.

The usual method of scaffold construction has the base of the scaffold built on the ground, with the top being built higher to keep up with the height of the tower. The scaffolding on the Willow Island cooling tower was bolted to the structure it was being used to build. A layer of concrete was poured; then, after the concrete forms were removed, the scaffolding was raised and bolted onto the new section. Cranes atop the scaffolding raised buckets of concrete. One 5-foot (1.5 m) lift of concrete was poured each day.

== Collapse ==
On April 27, 1978, tower number 2 had reached a height of 166 feet (51 m). Just after 10:00 a.m., the previous day's concrete started to collapse under the weight of the scaffolding and the construction workers on it. Concrete and scaffolding began to unwrap from the top of the tower, first peeling counter-clockwise, then in both directions. A jumble of concrete, wooden forms, metal scaffolding, and construction workers fell into the hollow center of the tower. All fifty-one construction workers on the scaffold fell to their deaths.

Immediately following the collapse, other construction workers onsite began digging for their coworkers. Fire departments from Belmont, Parkersburg, Vienna, and St. Marys in West Virginia, and Marietta in Ohio, were called in. Ambulances from Parkersburg and Marietta hospitals were also dispatched. The Volunteer Fire Department in Belmont was turned into a temporary morgue. Many of the men could be identified only by the contents of their pockets. All but one worker were identified by co-workers.

== Investigation ==
The Occupational Safety and Health Administration (OSHA) investigation team arrived at the site the day of the accident. A team from the National Bureau of Standards (now called the National Institute of Standards and Technology) arrived two days later.

A number of safety lapses caused the collapse:

- Scaffolding was attached to concrete that had not been given time to sufficiently cure.
- Bolts were missing, and the existing bolts were of insufficient grade. (See Bolted joint)
- There was only one access ladder, thereby resulting in an escape restriction.
- An elaborate concrete hoisting system had been modified without proper engineering review.
- Contractors were rushing the construction.

On June 8, 1978, OSHA cited Willow Island contractors for 20 violations, including failures to field test concrete and anchor the scaffold system properly. The cases were settled for $85,500, or about $1,700 per worker killed. OSHA referred the case to the United States Department of Justice for criminal investigation. A grand jury was convened, but no charges were filed.

== List of those killed ==
- Joseph V. Bafile, Washington, Pa.
- James B. Blouir, St. Marys
- Robert W. Blouir, St. Marys
- Steve D. Blouir, St. Marys
- Kenneth E. Boring, Salem
- Richard L. Bowser, Parkersburg
- Thomas E. Cross, St. Marys
- William R. Cunningham, Parkersburg
- Roy F. Deem, Waverly
- Ray Deulley, Glenville
- Darryl Glover, Moundsville
- Loren K. Glover, Moundsville
- Alvin W. Goff, Tuppers Plains, Ohio
- Gary L. Gossett, Walker
- James A. Harrison, Parkersburg
- Claude J. Hendrickson, St. Marys
- Daniel R. Hensler, Newport, Ohio
- Kenneth V. Hill, Midland, Pa.
- Roger K. Hunt, Parkersburg
- Tom G. Kaptis, Cairo
- C. Randy Lowther, St. Marys
- Ronald Lee Mathers, Walker
- Howard R. McBrayer Jr., St. Marys
- Willard H. McCown, Pennsboro
- Clayton P. "Paul" Monroe, Parkersburg
- Robert B. Moore, Flatwoods
- Chet Payne, St. Marys
- Edgar A. Phillips, Marietta, Ohio
- Raymond W. Poling, Thornton
- Robert C. Riley, Parkersburg
- Ray R. Rollyson, Pennsboro
- Floyd Rupe, Dexter, Ohio
- Alan W. Sampson, Parkersburg
- Glen E. Satterfield, St. Marys
- Jeffry F. Snyder, Vienna
- Earnest Steele, St. Marys
- Emmett R. Steele, St. Marys
- Larry G. Steele, St. Marys
- Miles E. Steele, St. Marys
- Ronald D. Steele, St. Marys
- Richard A. Stoke, Waverly
- Richard P. Swick, Beverly, Ohio
- Brian H. Taylor, St. Marys
- Dale Martin Wagoner, Belington
- Charles Warren, Parkersburg
- Jackie R. Westfall, Newport, Ohio
- Lewis D. Wildman, Stouts Mills
- Ronald W. Yocum, Parkersburg
- Gary Hinkle, Parkersburg
- Larry Deem, Parkersburg
- Fred Pride, St. Marys

== Other cooling tower collapses ==
- A cooling tower at the Vermont Yankee Nuclear Power Plant collapsed on August 22, 2007. There were no fatalities.
- On November 1, 1965, three of the cooling towers at Ferrybridge Power Station collapsed due to vibrations in 85 mph (137 km/h) winds.
- On November 20, 1979, a cooling tower of Bouchain Power Station near Bouchain, France collapsed.
- A cooling tower of Turow Power Plant, Bogatynia, Poland collapsed in 1987.
- Collapse of Ivanovo Power Plant, Cooling Tower 4 near Ivanovo, Russia in 2015, no casualties.
- Scaffolding collapsed on a cooling tower being built at the Fengcheng power plant in the eastern Chinese province of Jiangxi on November 24, 2016. At least 74 workers were killed.

== See also ==
- Pleasants Power Station
- Allegheny Energy
