= Poorwo Soedarmo =

Indonesian nutritionist

Dr Poorwo Soedarmo (1904 in Malang, East Java, Indonesia – 13 March 2003) was an Indonesian nutritionist. He is regarded as the "Father of Nutrition" ("Bapak gizi") in Indonesia.

== Career ==
Poorwo Soedarmo lived in Banten, West Jakarta, during the Japanese occupation in Indonesia and was head of its medical services until 1948. He was then expelled during the time of emerging Indonesian independence and went as a ship's doctor on the "Polodarus" (a Blue Funnel Line ship) to the Netherlands for six months and then to London in 1949. This was the turning point in his career orientation towards nutrition.

At the London School of Hygiene and Tropical Medicine, he undertook studies in malaria and the role of DDT in its control with Prof McDonald, but also developed an interest in nutrition with Professor Platt.

He became aware of diseases as nutritional, such as the dermatological manifestations of kwashiorkor, which previously had not been appreciated in Indonesia.

On his return to Indonesia he set up a dietetic school with the help of Dutch dietitians who stayed on under contract in Indonesia after independence. "Akademi Gizi" was founded in 1952 and the dietetic school commenced operation in 1950.

== Family life ==
After the death of his first wife, he married Djoeweriah (born 1920 in Jakarta), a noted Indonesian home economist. He had eight children, 21 grandchildren and four great-grandchildren. One of his sons is Professor Sumarmo Poorwo Soedarmono, adviser to the Indonesian Minister of Health.
