= Cuti bersama =

Collective leave day in Indonesia

Cuti bersama (or the “joint holiday”, literally collective leave) is a collective leave day in Indonesia. Cuti bersama was introduced by the Indonesian government as a means of stimulating tourism within the country and increasing the efficiency of public servants. Private companies and businesses follow suit by adjusting in line with government policy. During major religious holidays such as before and after the Eid al-Fitr day in three days, and also one day after the Christmas joint-holiday can span an entire working week. Mostly bank and most companies are closed during Major religious joint holiday.

== See also ==
- Public holidays in Indonesia
