= Pekka Oinonen =

Finnish Foreign Affairs Counselor

Pekka Oinonen (born. 23 January 1944 Helsinki) is a Finnish Foreign Affairs Counselor who served as Ambassador to Sofia from 1990 to 1992, Tallinn from 1996 to 2001 and Dublin from 2001 to 2005. Since 2007, he has been Deputy Director of the Legal Department of the Ministry for Foreign Affairs.

Oinonen started working at the Ministry of Foreign Affairs in 1969, where he has also worked in the Administrative Department, the Development Cooperation Department and the Department of Commerce in addition to the Legal Department. From 1982 to 1985, he was a cabinet justice at the Ministry of Trade and Industry. He also worked as an inspector of foreign affairs from 1992 to 1996.
