= Belmont, West Virginia =

- Town
- Logo

- Location of Belmont in Pleasants County, West Virginia.
- Coordinates: 39°22′35″N 81°16′05″W
- Country: United States
- State: West Virginia
- County: Pleasants
- Incorporated: April 19, 1946

Area
  - Total: 0.41 sq mi (1.06 km^{2})
  - Land: 0.41 sq mi (1.06 km^{2})
  - Water: 0 sq mi (0.00 km^{2})
- Elevation: 643 ft (196 m)

Population (2020)
  - Total: 872
  - Estimate (2021): 862
  - Density: 2,112.1/sq mi (815.49/km^{2})
- Time zone: UTC-5 (Eastern (EST))
  - Summer (DST): UTC-4 (EDT)
- ZIP code: 26134
- Area code: 304
- FIPS code: 54-06004
- GNIS feature ID: 2390564
- Website: https://www.cityofbelmont.info/about

Belmont is a town in Pleasants County, West Virginia, United States. It is part of the Parkersburg–Vienna metropolitan area. The population was 872 at the 2020 census.

== History ==
Belmont was incorporated on April 19, 1946, by the Circuit Court of Pleasants County. The city was named for the beautiful hills (beau mont) in the area.

== Geography ==
Belmont is located along the Ohio River.

According to the United States Census Bureau, the city has a total area of 0.41 square miles (1.06 km^{2}), all land.

== Demographics ==
Historical population
Census	Pop.	Note	%±
1950	215		—
1960	454		111.2%
1970	802		76.7%
1980	887		10.6%
1990	912		2.8%
2000	1,036		13.6%
2010	903		−12.8%
2020	872		−3.4%
2021 (est.)	862		−1.1%
U.S. Decennial Census

=== 2010 census ===
As of the census of 2010, there were 903 people, 361 households, and 234 families living in the city. The population density was 2,202.4 inhabitants per square mile (850.4/km^{2}). There were 395 housing units at an average density of 963.4 per square mile (372.0/km^{2}). The racial makeup of the city was 97.2% White, 0.3% African American, 0.7% Native American, 0.1% Asian, 0.1% from other races, and 1.6% from two or more races. Hispanic or Latino of any race were 0.8% of the population.

There were 361 households, of which 31.3% had children under the age of 18 living with them, 49.6% were married couples living together, 11.6% had a female householder with no husband present, 3.6% had a male householder with no wife present, and 35.2% were non-families. 30.7% of all households were made up of individuals, and 15.2% had someone living alone who was 65 years of age or older. The average household size was 2.32 and the average family size was 2.93.

The median age in the city was 44.7 years. 22.6% of residents were under the age of 18; 5.3% were between the ages of 18 and 24; 22.3% were from 25 to 44; 27.9% were from 45 to 64; and 21.8% were 65 years of age or older. The gender makeup of the city was 44.9% male and 55.1% female.

=== 2000 census ===
As of the census of 2000, there were 1,036 people, 401 households, and 289 families living in the city. The population density was 2,376.6 people per square mile (909.1/km^{2}). There were 411 housing units at an average density of 942.8 per square mile (360.7/km^{2}). The racial makeup of the city was 98.84% White, 0.29% African American, 0.48% Native American, and 0.39% from two or more races.

There were 401 households, out of which 33.4% had children under the age of 18 living with them, 53.6% were married couples living together, 15.7% had a female householder with no husband present, and 27.9% were non-families. 24.7% of all households were made up of individuals, and 13.7% had someone living alone who was 65 years of age or older. The average household size was 2.43 and the average family size was 2.85.

In the city, the population was spread out, with 23.1% under the age of 18, 9.1% from 18 to 24, 26.0% from 25 to 44, 24.2% from 45 to 64, and 17.7% who were 65 years of age or older. The median age was 40 years. For every 100 females, there were 77.4 males. For every 100 females age 18 and over, there were 72.9 males.

The median income for a household in the city was $27,375, and the median income for a family was $37,656. Males had a median income of $34,000 versus $21,071 for females. The per capita income for the city was $14,802. About 21.5% of families and 23.7% of the population were below the poverty line, including 37.3% of those under age 18 and 19.3% of those age 65 or over.

== Points of interest ==
- Pleasants Power Plant

== See also ==
- List of cities and towns along the Ohio River
