= Raising the Flag on the Three-Country Cairn =

Photograph depicting the end of World War II in Finland

Coordinates: 69°03′35.9″N 20°32′55.1″E

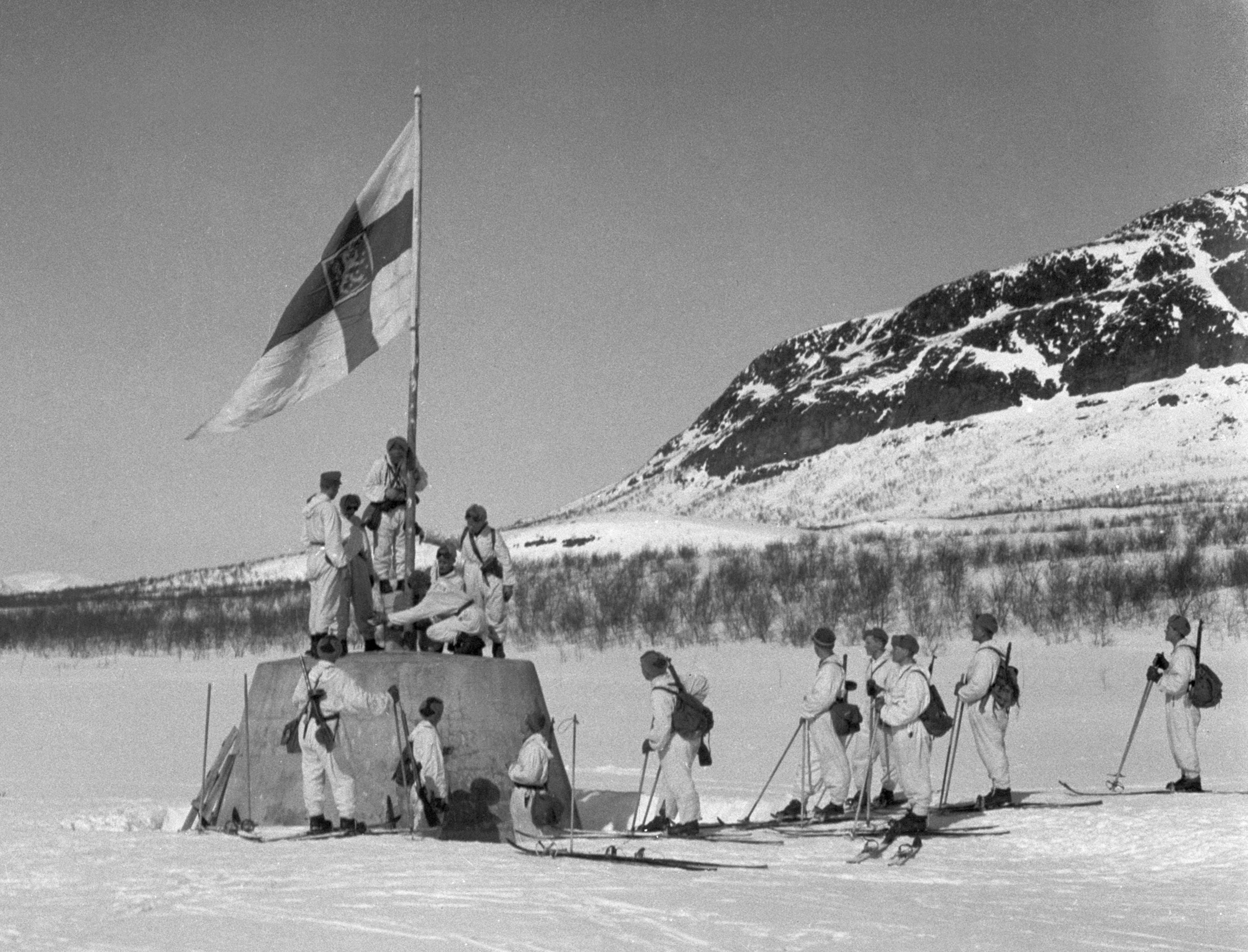
Finnish soldiers raise the war flag at the three-country cairn between Norway, Sweden, and Finland on 27 April 1945, the end of World War II in Finland

Raising the Flag on the Three-Country Cairn (Note: Colonel Oinonen originally titled the picture as a "scene at the three-country boundary stone on 27 April 1945" (Finnish: Kohtaus kolmen valtakunnan rajakivellä 27.4.1945; original photograph scan received from the Military Museum of Finland), but it is usually labelled as "Finnish soldiers raising the flag on the three-country cairn" (Finnish: Suomalaissotilaat nostavat lipun kolmen valtakunnan rajapyykille) or a similar variation.) is a historic photograph taken on 27 April 1945, which was the last day of the Second World War in Finland. It depicts a Finnish Army patrol of Battle Group Loimu, Infantry Regiment 1 (Finnish: taisteluosasto Loimu, jalkaväkirykmentti 1), raising the Finnish war flag on the three-country cairn between Norway, Sweden, and Finland. As the cairn marked the westernmost point on the Finnish mainland, this symbolized that the last German troops were gone from Finland. The photograph was taken by the commander of Infantry Regiment 1, Colonel Väinö Oinonen (alternatively V. J. Oinonen). It became a widely circulated symbol of the end of World War II in Finland.

== Background ==
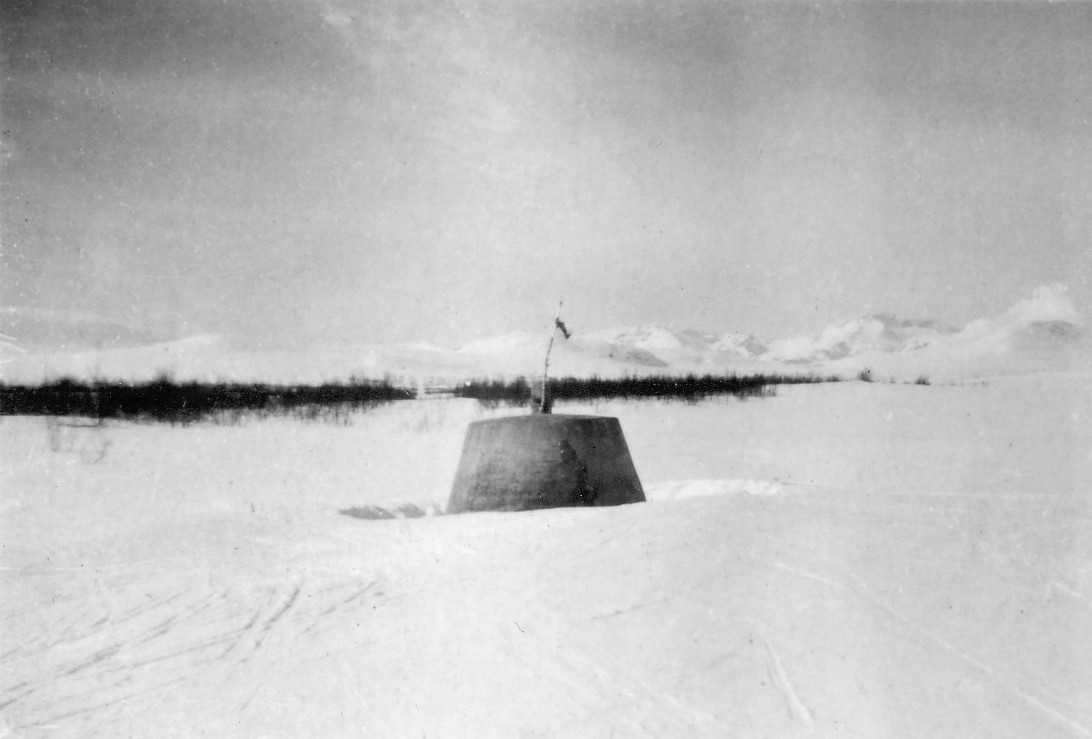
The small Finnish flag raised first on the cairn on 26 April 1945

Amidst World War II, Finland fought both the Winter War of 1939–1940 and Continuation War of 1941–1944 against the Soviet Union. During the latter, Finland cooperated with Nazi Germany, who deployed the 200,000-strong 20th Mountain Army led by Generaloberst Lothar Rendulic to Finnish Lapland. In September 1944, Finland agreed to a separate peace with the Soviet Union, which required that Finland disarm or expel any German soldiers from Finland. The demand led to the Lapland War; the 20th Mountain Army started withdrawing north towards occupied Norway with the Finnish Army's III Corps, led by General Hjalmar Siilasvuo, in pursuit. By November, the war came to an effective end when most German units had withdrawn to Norway and the Lyngen Line –although some entrenched German forces still remained in Finland at Kilpisjärvi in the corridor leading to the border tripoint between Norway, Sweden, and Finland. (Note: The corridor is nationally called Arm's Lapland (Finnish: Käsivarren Lappi) or the Finnish Arm (Swedish: Finska armen).)

On 25 April 1945, after it was determined that the final German formations in Finnish territory were withdrawing, a 60-strong battle patrol led by Captain Valkonen was assigned to reconnoitre if Finnish Lapland was free from Wehrmacht forces. The detachment was assembled from 1st Company, Battle Group Loimu, Infantry Regiment 1, and departed on its mission at 1:00 pm the same day from southern Kilpisjärvi. The ski patrol advanced north-west towards Norway for around 8 km (5.0 mi) until it was split in two near the Saana fell. The smaller group would approach the Norwegian border along the road while the bulk of the patrol would continue with Captain Valkonen towards the three-country cairn farther off. They reached the cairn by 1:15 am on 26 April after skiing approximately 10 km (6.2 mi) more. Pioneer Antti Poikola attached a small flag of Finland to the cairn and the patrol reported back by radio that no Germans had been sighted on Finnish soil. Valkonen and his team shot three gun salutes at the cairn before leaving; the shots rang out across the fells and startled a Swedish border guard unit nearby.

Around noon of 26 April, Major Martti Santavuori, commander of the battalion, and a mixed Finnish–Swedish patrol arrived at the tripoint. A German Gebirgsjäger unit approached them from Norway, and, with knowledge that they would not engage the Swedes, Major Santavuori signalled the German leader to meet up at the border. An Austrian Feldwebel soon skied closer and they discussed the war, both past and future. Major Santavuori and the Feldwebel saluted, shook hands and bid each other "as good a future as fate has to offer" before parting ways.

== Flag-raising ==
Location of the tripoint depicted on a map of northern Europe (modern boundaries shown)

On 27 April, commander of Infantry Regiment 1, Colonel Väinö Oinonen, arrived at the cairn to inspect the situation with a detachment of soldiers including photography specialists, a larger flag, and a better flagpole. The war flag of Finland was ceremoniously raised on the cairn and Colonel Oinonen took the titular photo with the 894 m (2,933 ft)-high Golddabákti fell of Norway in the background. Amidst the festivities, a shout of "Wer da?!" ("Who's there?!") surprised the Finnish soldiers. Even though the area had been inspected, a German unit was in position on the Norwegian side of the border. The flag-raising soldiers took cover behind the cairn. Battle was avoided after a Swedish army officer approached to act as an intermediary. Colonel Oinonen soon resolved the situation with two Oberleutnants, who shared German Juno cigarettes with him. The officers saluted each other and went their separate ways; the time was 1:30 p.m. On 28 April, General Siilasvuo sent a telegram to Finnish Commander-in-Chief C.G.E. Mannerheim, reporting that the Wehrmacht had been expelled from Northern Finland.

== Aftermath ==
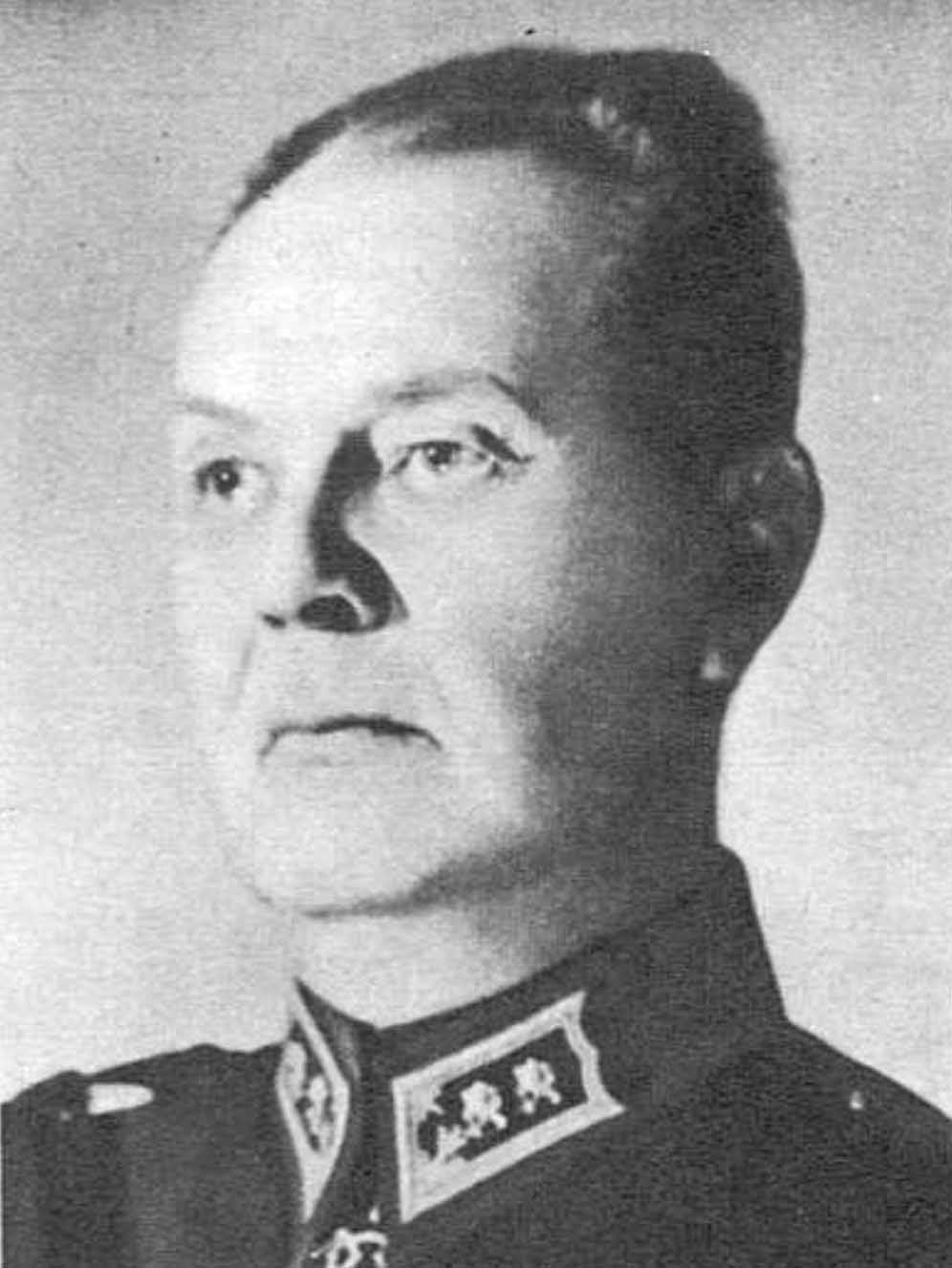
Väinö Oinonen, who took the photograph, pictured before 1957

The picture became widely circulated in Finland and became an exemplar of war photography in Finnish World War II history. It has been compared to similar pictures, such as the American Raising the Flag on Iwo Jima and the Soviet Raising a Flag over the Reichstag. The Finnish popular memory of the conflict relied equally on illustrations, such as the cover of The Unknown Soldier, a 1954 war novel about the Continuation War.

== See also ==
- Aftermath of World War II
- Hitler and Mannerheim recording
- Liberation of Finnmark
- List of photographs considered the most important
- National Veterans' Day
