= National Veterans' Day =

National day of remembrance in Finland

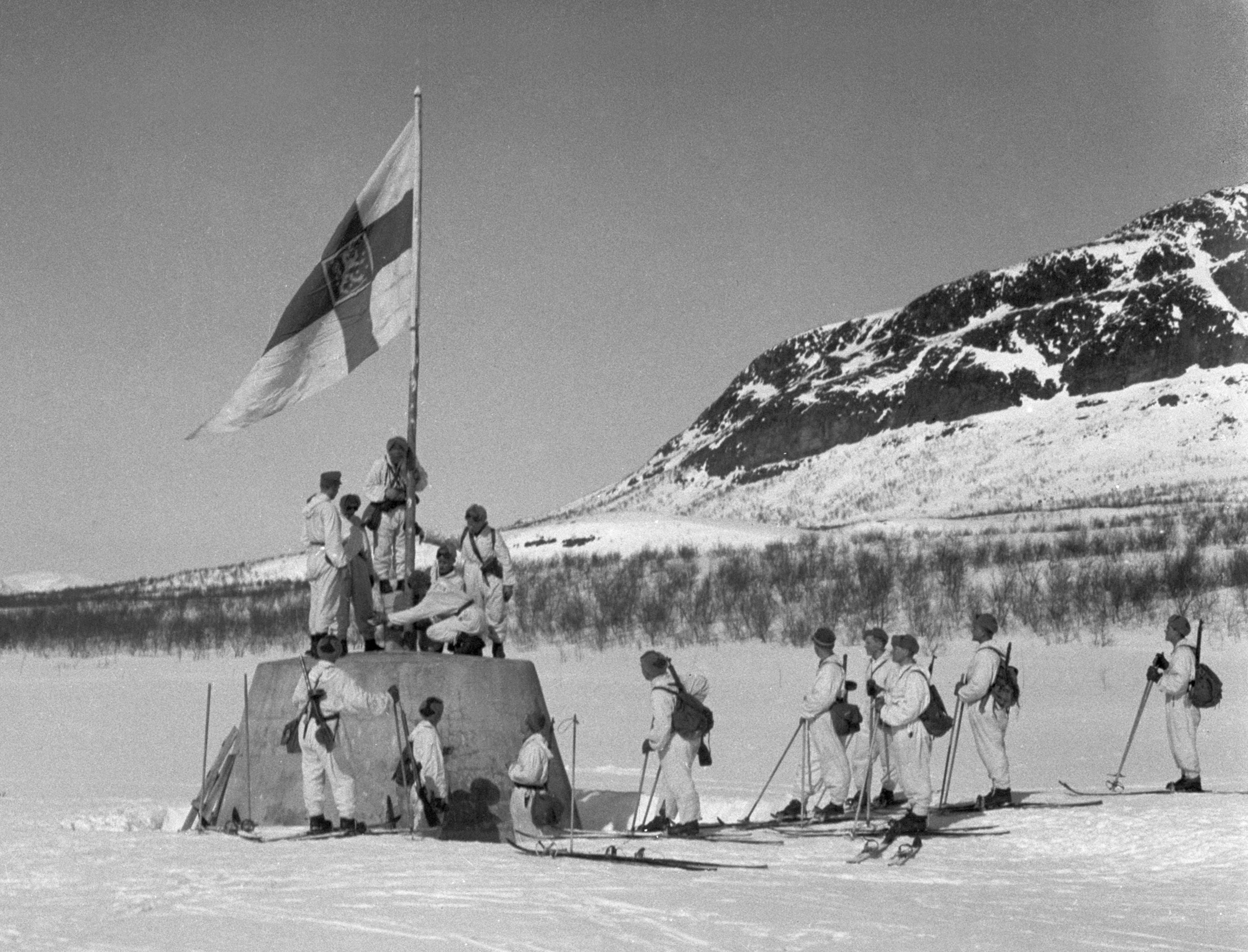
- Finnish soldiers raise the war flag at the three-country cairn between Norway, Sweden, and Finland on 27 April 1945, ending the Lapland War, and the Second World War in Finland.
- Official name: Finnish: kansallinen veteraanipäivä Swedish: nationella veterandagen
- Observed by: Finland
- Significance: remembrance day for all the war veterans of Finland
- Date: 27 April
- Next time: 27 April 2027
- Frequency: annual

National Veterans' Day (Finnish: kansallinen veteraanipäivä, Swedish: nationella veterandagen) is a remembrance day for all the war veterans of Finland. It is celebrated each year on 27 April.

According to Moscow Armistice Finland was obliged to demand all German troops to leave Finland by 15 September 1944, which was technically impossible. The Germans executed the operation Tanne Ost, trying to occupy Hogland from the Finnish armed forces and defend the Estonian coast from the Soviet Baltic Navy on the Eastern isles of the Baltic Sea. The Finns, at the request of the Allied Control Committee, attacked the Germans in Pudasjärvi on 28 September 1944, which marked the beginning of combat in Finnish Lapland between the former co-belligerents. World War II in Finland ended on 27 April 1945, when the very last German troops had left Finland and crossed the border to the German-occupied Norway in the municipality of Enontekiö. Finnish Defence Forces would reach Three-Country Cairn of Finland, Norway and Sweden that same day.

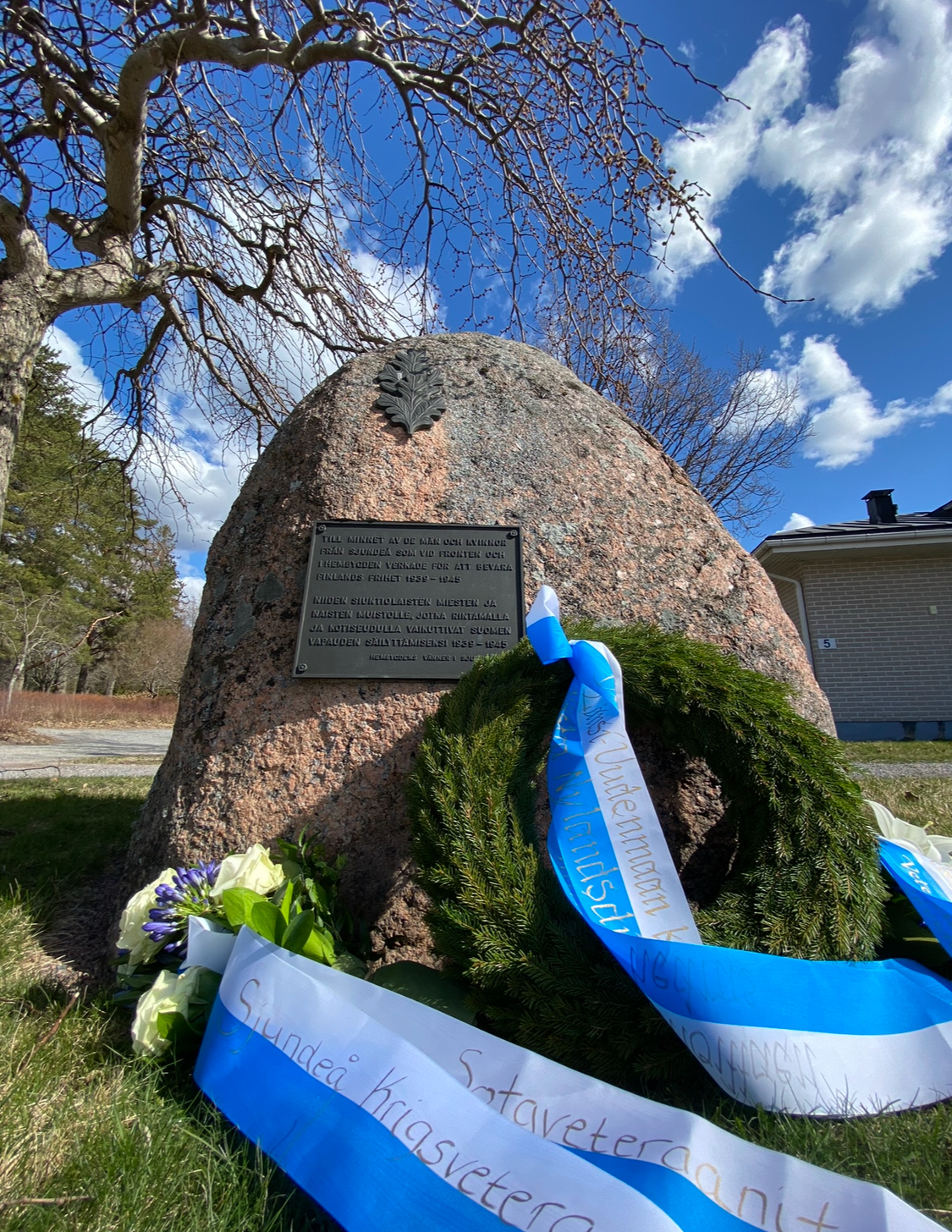
Memorial wreaths laid at the veteran stone in Siuntio.

Even if the day reminds a victory day, it is not celebrated as such. Among the events there are services in the Evangelical Lutheran churches, honorary guards on the war hero tombs, deposing wreath and the collecting money for the charity of the last war veterans' needs.

== History ==
On the initiative of the war veteran organisations the Finnish Government declared the National Veterans' Day in 1986. It was celebrated the first time in Lahti, 27 April 1987. There is one main event and several smaller main events in the various regions and many local events.

- 24th National Veterans' Day, in Tampere 2010
  - 11 000 attendants, 4 300 in the main happening
- 25th National Veterans' Day, in Turku 2011
  - Motto
    - Finnish: Viesti kulkee – vetovastuu vaihtuu
    - Swedish: Budskapet förs vidare – vi yngre tar över
    - English: The message is carried – we the younger take over
