= Pleasants Power Station =

Coal-fired power plant in Pleasants County, West Virginia

- Pleasants Power Station viewed from West Virginia Route 2 in 2015
- Country: United States
- Location: Belmont, West Virginia
- Coordinates: 39°22′01″N 81°17′41″W
- Status: Operational
- Commission date: Unit 1: 1979; Unit 2: 1980
- Owner: Omnis Pleasants LLC

Thermal power station
- Primary fuel: Coal

Power generation
- Nameplate capacity: 1,300 MW

External links
- Commons: Related media on Commons

Pleasants Power Station is a 1.3-gigawatt (1,300 MW) coal power plant located near Belmont, West Virginia, in Pleasants County, West Virginia. The plant is owned by Omnis Pleasants LLC and began operations in 1979. The power plant was the site of the Willow Island disaster in 1978.

== History ==
In what is considered to be the deadliest construction accident in United States history, Cooling Tower #2 collapsed on April 27, 1978 as it was still under construction. Fifty-one workers were killed in the accident.

Pleasants was completed in 1980 at a cost of $677 million. There are two cooling towers, each 428 feet (130 m) high, and two 1,000-foot (305 m)-high chimneys. In 2008, Allegheny Energy completed a $105 million project which saw the installation of flue-gas desulfurization (FGD) technology which reduced sulfur dioxide (SO_{2}) emissions at Pleasants. FirstEnergy would assume ownership of Pleasants following its merger with Allegheny Energy in 2011.

In December 2016, FirstEnergy announced they were putting Pleasants up for sale. FirstEnergy had plans to sell Pleasants to its subsidiaries, Potomac Edison and Monongahela Power for $195 million. The sale would help meet its subsidiaries projected shortfalls of electricity demand. Although the West Virginia Public Service Commission gave a conditional approval of the sale in January 2018, it was rejected by the Federal Energy Regulatory Commission (FERC) as the sale did not meet public interest. The sale of Pleasants was cancelled the following month. This decision forced FirstEnergy to consider either selling or closing Pleasants by the end of 2018. Ownership was then transferred to FirstEnergy Solutions in September 2018 with closure delayed to June 1, 2022. To stave off a potential closure, a bill passed by the West Virginia Legislature and signed into law by Governor Jim Justice would give FirstEnergy Solutions $12.5 million in annual tax breaks.

FirstEnergy's generating division Energy Harbor (previously called FirstEnergy Solutions) announced in March 2022 that it would close both units by June 2023. However, the West Virginia Public Service Commission approved a subsidy deal under which Mon Power ratepayers will pay $3 million a month to keep the power plant from closing. However, the plant ceased operation in June 2023 and the subsidy deal was later abandoned in July as Quantum Pleasants purchased the power plant with plans to use the hydrogen byproducts of their graphite production to power the plant. Until the plant is upgraded to use hydrogen, it has resumed coal operations starting August 31, 2023 under the new ownership.

In July 2026, the current owners of the power plant filed for Chapter 11 bankruptcy protection after revealing tens of millions of dollars in debt. CEO David Hindman accused former ownership of fraud after millions of dollars went into a never-finished hydrogen technology project instead of the power plant. The filing allows for the power plant to be sold off once more without debt.
