= April 1978 =

Month of 1978

<<	April 1978					>>
Su	Mo	Tu	We	Th	Fr	Sa
						1
2	3	4	5	6	7	8
9	10	11	12	13	14	15
16	17	18	19	20	21	22
23	24	25	26	27	28	29
30

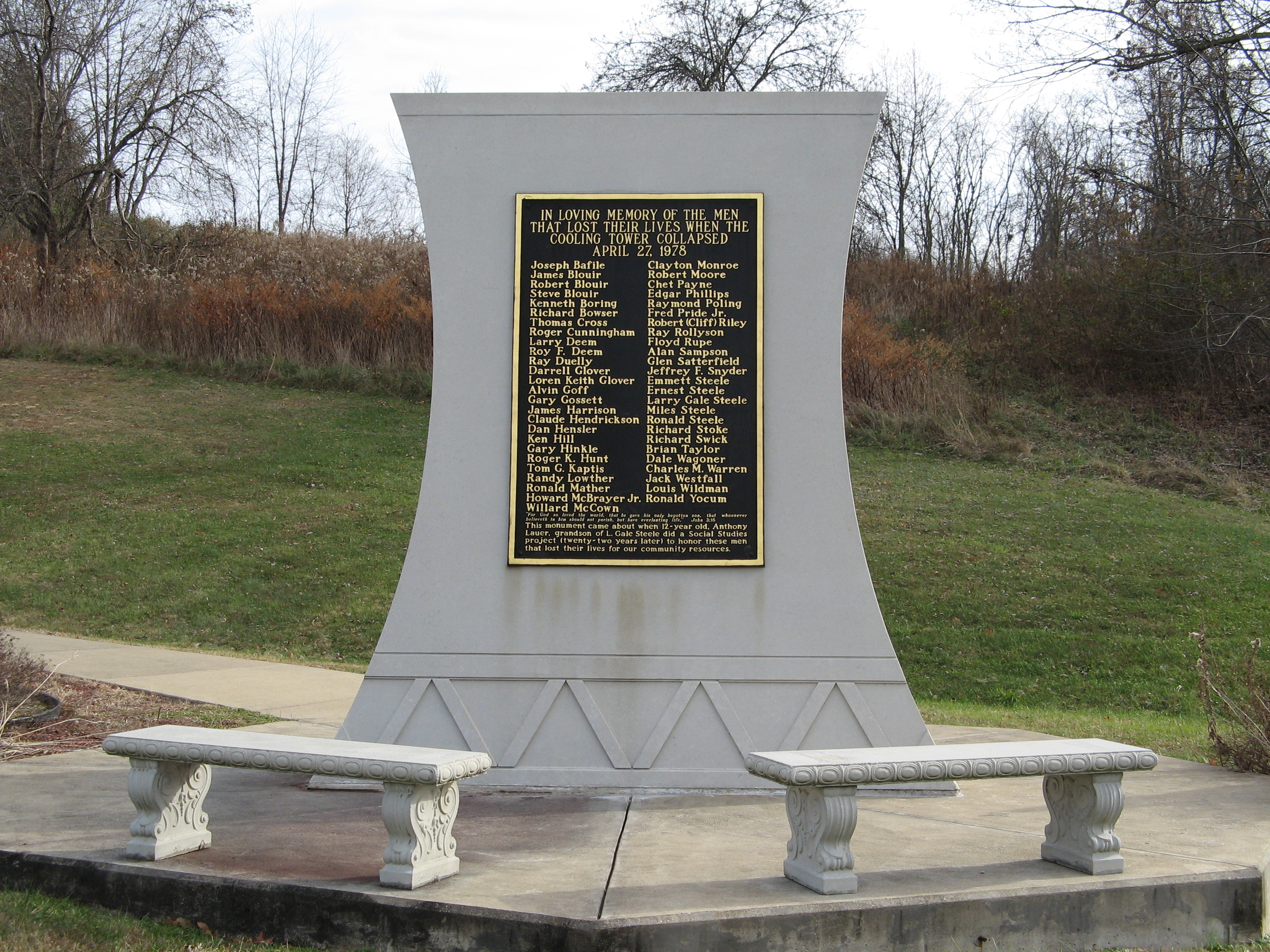
April 27, 1978: Monument to the construction workers killed in the Willow Island disaster

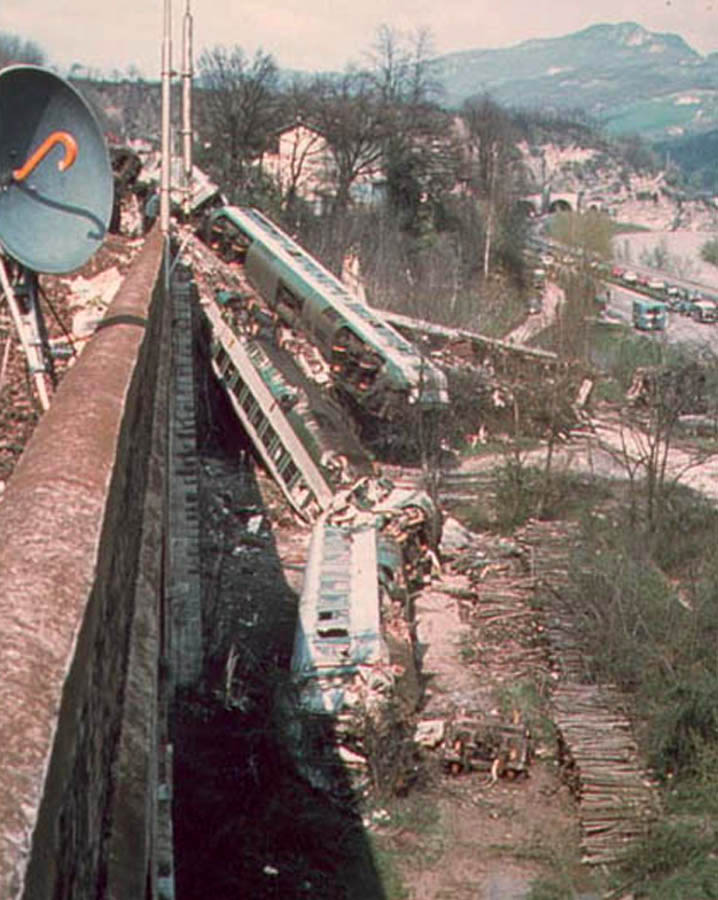
April 15, 1978: Train wreck in Italy kills 48 people and injures 117

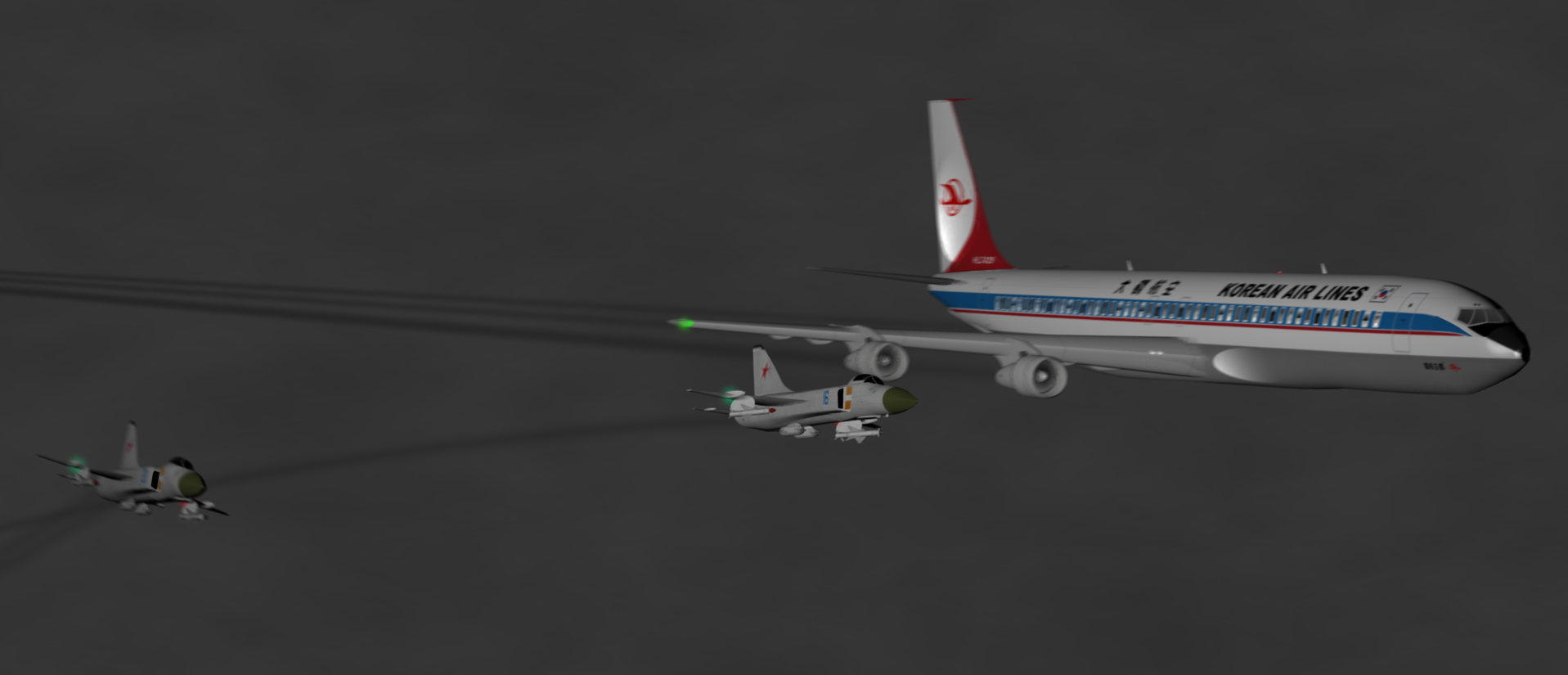
April 20, 1978: Korean Air Lines Flight 902 strayed into Soviet airspace, leading to the Soviet Air Force intercepting and shooting it down (artist's rendition)

The following events occurred in April 1978:

== April 1, 1978 (Saturday) ==
- Space Invaders, one of the most popular arcade video games of its time and a breakthrough in display, was introduced in arcades in Japan by the electronic entertainment company Taito, and would be brought to North America in November. The game was the first in video with no time limit and no limit on scoring, with players able to continue (as in pinball) for as long as their skills would allow.
- Dick Smith of Dick Smith Foods staged an elaborate April Fool's Day prank in Australia by towing a fake, but realistic-looking iceberg into Sydney Harbour.
- Lucius, ridden by Bob Davies, won the Grand National steeplechase at Aintree Racecourse, near Liverpool in England. Rag Trade, the 1976 Grand National winner, pulled up at Fence 21 and was later euthanized.
- New Zealand National Airways Corporation (NAC), the domestic airline of New Zealand merged with the nation's international airline, Air New Zealand.
- The Philippine College of Commerce, through a presidential decree, was converted to the Polytechnic University of the Philippines.
- Freddy Maertens of Belgium won the 1978 E3 Prijs Vlaanderen cycle race.
- At Richmond International Airport in Richmond, Virginia, a hijacker commandeered a Piedmont Airlines Boeing 737-200 bound for Norfolk, Virginia, with 66 people on board, and forced the plane to fly to New York City, where he was arrested.
- In Yanchuan County in China's Shaanxi province, 12 people were killed when a truck fell off a road and into a deep valley near the village of Yanshuiguan.
- In Baton Rouge, Louisiana, five children between the ages of 4 months and 9 years died in a house fire after their mother left them alone to go grocery shopping. Firefighters delayed entering the house because they thought it was empty.
- Born:
  - Anamaria Marinca, Romanian film and TV actress, winner of the 2005 British Academy Television Award for Best Actress, for Sex Traffic; in Iași
  - Rolandas Džiaukštas, Lithuanian footballer who had 40 caps for the Lithuania national football team; in Vilnius, Lithuanian SSR, Soviet Union
  - Andrei Karyaka, Russian footballer with 27 caps for the Russia national team, later an assistant coach; in Dnipropetrovsk, Ukrainian SSR, Soviet Union
  - Jean-Pierre Dumont, Canadian professional ice hockey forward who played for the 2004 world champion Czech Republic national team; in Montreal
  - Antonio de Nigris, Mexican footballer with 17 caps for the Mexico national team; in Monterrey (d. 2009, heart attack)
  - Maxime Agueh, French-born Beninese footballer and goalkeeper with 9 caps for the Benin national team; in Lille, France

== April 2, 1978 (Sunday) ==
- The long-running American TV show Dallas, starring Larry Hagman as J. R. Ewing, began a run of 14 seasons and 357 episodes on CBS, creating the modern-day primetime soap opera. The show, popular worldwide, was ranked #1 in the U.S. Nielsen ratings in the 1980–81 and 1981–82 seasons, as well as the 1983–84 season.
- Pakistan won the 1978 field hockey World Cup in Buenos Aires, Argentina, defeating the Netherlands, 3 to 2.
- The United States men's curling team won the 1978 Air Canada Silver Broom and the World Curling Championships, at Winnipeg Arena in Canada.
- The "Bell Island Boom", the thunder from an unusually powerful lightning bolt in the upper atmosphere, was heard in and around the town of Bickfordville, Newfoundland, on Canada's Bell Island shortly before noon.
- The U.S. town of Brownson, Nebraska, with 500 people, was evacuated after the derailment and explosion of a tank car full of liquid phosphorus on the Union Pacific Railroad, but only three people were injured.
- Björn Borg won the men's singles title in the 1978 Milan Indoor tennis championship at the Palasport di San Siro in Italy.
- Jos Schipper of the Netherlands won the 1978 Dwars door België cycle race.
- Seven people were killed near Pettus, Texas, when a car collided with a van carrying a school band.
- Argentine driver Carlos Reutemann of the Scuderia Ferrari team won the 1978 United States Grand Prix West in Long Beach, California.
- Born:
  - Scott Lynch, American fantasy author known for the bestselling novel The Lies of Locke Lamora and its sequels; in Saint Paul, Minnesota
  - Nick Berg, American freelance businessman known for being kidnapped and beheaded by Islamic militants who videotaped the killing; in West Chester, Pennsylvania (murdered 2004)
  - Jaime Ray Newman, American TV actress known for Eastwick; in Farmington Hills, Michigan
  - Deon Richmond, American TV actor known for Sister, Sister; in Harlem, New York City
- Died:
  - Aurelio Baldor, 71, Cuban mathematician, educator and lawyer known for his textbooks used throughout the Spanish-speaking world
  - Jack Hubbard, 92, American college football player and inductee to the College Football Hall of Fame
  - Willi Kaidel, 65, German rower, silver medalist, winner of the 1937 European championships
  - Franco Pinna, 52, Italian neorealist photographer

== April 3, 1978 (Monday) ==
- Live radio broadcasts of British Parliamentary proceedings began.
- The 50th Academy Awards were held at the Dorothy Chandler Pavilion in Los Angeles, California. Annie Hall won the Academy Award for Best Picture, and its director, Woody Allen, and leading actress Diane Keaton won awards as well. Richard Dreyfuss won the Best Actor Award for The Goodbye Girl. Jason Robards and Vanessa Redgrave won the awards for Best Supporting Actor and Best Supporting Actress for Julia.
- The San Francisco Board of Supervisors voted, 10 to 1, to pass a gay rights ordinance, prohibiting discrimination against gay and lesbian people in employment, housing and public accommodations. The proposal had been introduced by the first openly gay city council member in the U.S., Harvey Milk, and the only vote against it was cast by Dan White. San Francisco mayor George Moscone signed the ordinance into law a few days later. White resigned on November 10, but sought to get his job back four days later. Refused, White murdered Moscone and Milk at City Hall on November 27, 1978.
- The French children's television series 1, rue Sésame, a French adaptation of the U.S. series Sesame Street, made its debut on the TF1 network.
- Born:
  - Luca Moncada, Italian rower and winner of the World Rowing Championships in 2001, 2002, 2003, 2005, 2006 and 2007; in Palermo
  - John Smit, South African rugby union player with 111 caps for the South Africa national rugby union team, the Springboks; in Pietersburg, Transvaal, South Africa
  - Raja Toumi, Tunisian handball player with 230 caps for the Tunisia national women's teamcoach; in Tunis
  - Matthew Goode, English actor; in Exeter, Devon
  - Michael Gravgaard, Danish footballer with 18 caps for the Denmark national team; in Spentrup
- Died:
  - Ernst Leche, Swedish jurist who helped establish, in 1938, Sweden's Allmänna säkerhetstjänsten ("General Security Service")
  - Ray Noble, 74, English bandleader and composer, died of cancer.
  - Karl Asplund, 87, Swedish poet, short story writer and art historian
  - Winston Sharples, 69, American film composer

== April 4, 1978 (Tuesday) ==
- Pakistani nuclear physicist A. Q. Khan announced that he and his team at the Engineering Research Laboratories in Kahuta had produced enriched uranium (with a substantial quantity of the isotope uranium-235) for the first time, less than two years after the laboratories had been established by Pakistan's secret "Project-706". The breakthrough in producing fissionable uranium made it possible for Pakistan to create its first atomic weapon; the explosion of an atomic bomb would not be attempted by Pakistan until May 26, 1998.
- Cyclone Alby caused heavy damage, killed 5 people and caused wildfires that (according to one report) destroyed two towns in Western Australia.
- Born:
  - Irene Skliva, Greek model and beauty pageant contestant who was crowned Miss World 1996; in Athens
  - René Wolff, German track cyclist who won the 2005 world championship for the sprint, and helped Germany win the 2004 Olympic gold medal; in Erfurt, Thuringia, East Germany
  - Marcel Nkueni, Congolese footballer with 12 caps for the Democratic Republic of the Congo team between 1997 and 2001; in Kinshasa, Zaire
  - Sam Moran, Australian singer for the children's band The Wiggles; in Sydney
  - Alan Mahon, Irish footballer with two caps for the Ireland national team; in Dublin
- Died: Morien Morgan CB FRS, 65, Welsh aeronautical engineer who led the effort of designing the Concorde supersonic aircraft

== April 5, 1978 (Wednesday) ==
- In Algiers, Algeria, mercenaries linked to the Spanish government attempted the assassination of Canary Islands Independence Movement leader Antonio Cubillo, stabbing him in the hallway of his house. Cubillo survived but was paralyzed.
- Avraham Amram, an Israeli Defense Forces soldier, was taken as a prisoner of war after being captured in a clash in Lebanon with soldiers of the Popular Front for the Liberation of Palestine. He would be freed on March 14, 1979, in return for the release by Israel of 76 convicted Palestinian prisoners in Israel's first prisoner exchange with an Arab terrorist organization.
- John Errol Ferguson, known for murdering 12 people in and around Carol City, Florida, over three and a half years, was arrested by FBI agents who had been tipped off about his location. Ferguson and three other people, Marvin Francois, Beauford White, and Adolphus Archie, were linked to the July 27, 1977, execution-style murder of six people at a Carol City home. While the other three were arrested a month later, Ferguson had remained at large and killed two teenagers on January 8. Ferguson would remain on death row the longest and would be executed by lethal injection on August 5, 2013.
- U.S. President Jimmy Carter gave an interview to Black Perspective, answering questions on his trip to Africa, national urban policy, support from African-Americans, his views on the presidency, reverse discrimination, the Humphrey-Hawkins bill, administration programs, foreign relations of the United States, and human rights.
- Born:
  - Arnaud Tournant, French track cyclist and winner of 14 UCI Track Cycling World Championships world championships from 1997 to 2008 in the Kilo, the 1,000 meter time trial, and the first person to ride one kilometer in less than a minute (58.75 seconds); in Roubaix, Nord département
  - Robert Glasper, American pianist, record producer and songwriter, winner of 5 Grammy Awards; in Houston
  - Franziska van Almsick, German swimmer, winner of two World Aquatics Championships (in 1994 in the 200m women's freestyle and the 1998 4 x 100 freestyle relay), and four Olympic silver medals (1992 and 1996); in East Berlin, East Germany
  - Bernd Heidicker, German rower, winner of the World Rowing Championships in 2002 and 2006 Olympic rower; in Recklinghausen, North Rhine-Westphalia, West Germany
  - Dwain Chambers, British Olympic track sprinter, winner of the 2010 World Athletics Indoor Championships in the 60-meter sprint; in London
  - Olek (artist) (Agata Oleksiak), Polish artist and sculptor; in Ruda Śląska, Poland
  - Tarek El-Said, Egyptian footballer with 61 caps for the Egypt national team from 1999 to 2005; in Tanta
  - Marcone Amaral Costa, Brazilian-born Qatari footballer with 38 caps for the Qatar national team from 2008 to 2013; in Poções, Brazil
  - Jairo Patiño, Colombian footballer with 35 caps for the Colombia national team; in Cali
  - Gerard Bush, American film director and screenwriter with his husband, Christopher Renz, in the Bush Renz partnership, known for the 2020 film Antebellum; in Houston
  - Alfredo Galán, Spanish serial killer who murdered six people and wounded three in the first three months of 2003; in Puertollano, Province of Ciudad Real, Castilla–La Mancha
  - Helgi Petersen, Faroese footballer with 8 caps for the Faroe Islands team; in Runavík
- Died: Carlo Tagliabue, 80, Italian baritone

== April 6, 1978 (Thursday) ==
- U.S. President Carter named Colonel Margaret A. Brewer to become the first female general officer in the United States Marine Corps, as well as the Corps' first female director of information.
- Fred Richmond, a member of the United States House of Representatives from New York, was arraigned in Washington, D.C., on a charge of soliciting sex from a 16-year-old boy. Although Richmond admitted to the act, he won the Democratic primary nomination again the following month and would be re-elected to Congress in 1978 and in 1980, before being arrested in 1982 on charges of tax evasion and drug possession, after which he would resign from Congress.
- The 1978 Masters Tournament began at Augusta National Golf Club in Augusta, Georgia. John Schlee of the United States was the leader after the first day.
- Gene Leroy Hart was arrested in Adair County, Oklahoma, for the killing of three Girl Scouts at a summer camp on June 13, 1977. Hart would be acquitted of the murders on March 30, 1979.
- Born:
  - Lauren Ridloff, American stage, TV and film actress known for The Walking Dead, Eternals and the Broadway revival of Children of a Lesser God, earning her a Tony Award nomination for Best Actress in a Play; in Chicago
  - Daphny van den Brand, Netherlands cyclo-cross bicycle racer, 2003 World Cyclo-cross Champion, three time European champion (2006, 2007 and 2010); in Zeeland, North Brabant
  - Igor Semshov, Russian footballer with 57 caps for the Russia national team from 2002 to 2012; in Moscow, Russian SFSR, Soviet Union
  - Jaco van der Westhuyzen, South African rugby union player with 32 caps for the Springboks national team; in Nelspruit
  - Fabiano Pereira, Brazilian footballer with 20 caps for the Brazilian national team that appeared in the 2000 Summer Olympic; in Marília, São Paulo, Brazil
  - Thomas Herschmiller, Canadian rower whose four-man team won the 2003 World Championships and finished second in the 2004 Olympic games; in Comox, British Columbia
- Died:
  - Nicolas Nabokov, 74, Russian-American composer and writer
  - Leslie Barker, 28, American schoolteacher and murder victim, was murdered in Akron, Ohio, between 3 a.m. and 5 a.m. after having gone to a bar hours earlier on a date with a person matched by a "computer dating" service. Barker's remains were found in the back seat of her car, which had been set on fire. As of 2021 the case would remain unsolved.

== April 7, 1978 (Friday) ==
- The first parliamentary elections since 1969 in the Philippines were held for 179 of the 189 seats in the new Interim Batasang Pambansa, with the winners to take office on June 12. The party of President Ferdinand Marcos, the Kilusang Bagong Lipunan (KBL), won 150 of the seats and more than 71% of the vote. Although the Lakas ng Bayan (LABAN) party of Benigno Aquino Jr. got more than 10 percent of the vote, its candidates won no seats at all in the Batasang. The Bagong Lipunan party won less than 4 percent of the vote but won 14 seats, and the Pusyon Bisaya party of future Chief Justice Hilario Davide Jr. got less than 5 percent of the vote and 13 seats.
- Members of the Liberation Tigers of Tamil Eelam, led by Uma Maheswaran, killed a team of four officers of the Criminal Investigation Department (CID) of the Sri Lanka Police led by Inspector of Police T.L.B. Bastianpillai.
- At the age of 19, Prince Rogers Nelson of Minneapolis, known by his mononym of Prince, released his debut album, For You, on the Warner Bros. label.
- U.S. President Jimmy Carter decided to postpone production of the neutron bomb, a weapon that kills people with radiation, but leaves buildings relatively intact.

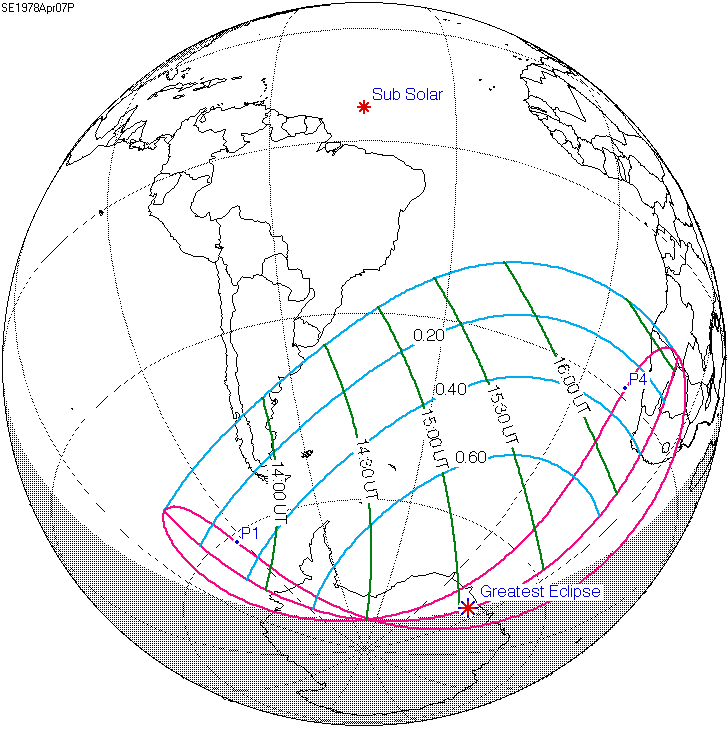
Partial solar eclipse of April 7, 1978

- A partial solar eclipse was visible in parts of Antarctica and southern Africa.
- The Russian-owned cargo ship Astron ran aground off the coast of Punta Cana, Dominican Republic, while carrying corn to Cuba, spilling 7330 barrels of bunker fuel. The wreck is still in place and attracts underwater divers.

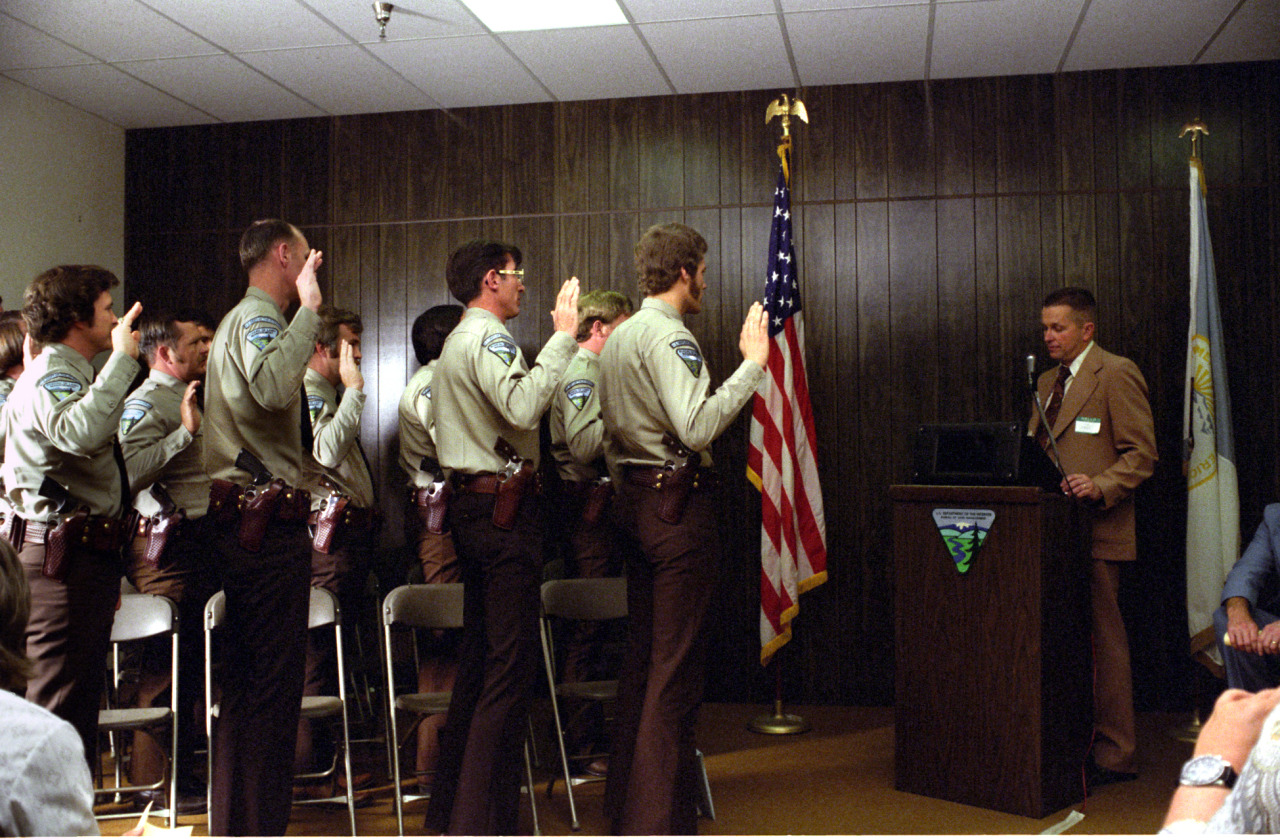
First 13 Bureau of Land Management rangers take oath of office

- The first 13 rangers of the United States Bureau of Land Management were sworn in.*Carmen Franco, 1st Duchess of Franco, daughter of Francisco Franco, attempted to board a flight from Madrid–Barajas Airport to Lausanne, Switzerland, with a bag full of gold, jewelry and medals that had belonged to her father. She was accused of smuggling.
- Born:
  - Davor Dominiković, Croatian handball player with 174 appearances for the Croatia national men's handball team that won the 2004 Olympic games and the 2003 World Championship; in Metković, SR Croatia, SFR Yugoslavia
  - Marius Țincu, Romanian rugby union player with 53 caps for the Romania national team; in Vânători, Iași
  - Jimmy Akingbola, British actor known for HolbyBlue and Holby City; in Plaistow, Newham, England
  - Duncan James, English singer and TV actor known for the Channel 4 soap opera Hollyoaks; in Bournemouth, Dorset
- Died: Albert Tangora, 74, American office supplies store owner best known for setting the record of 147 words per minute on a manual typewriter in a speed typing contest on October 22, 1923, a mark that has never been exceeded in more than 100 years after it was achieved.

== April 8, 1978 (Saturday) ==
- The homes of two Iranian dissidents were bombed by SAVAK, the Shah of Iran's secret police, in Tehran. Neither Mehdi Bazargan, who would become the first Prime Minister of the Islamic Republic of Iran, nor Karim Sanjabi, the republic's first Minister of Foreign Affairs, sustained any injuries. A group that called itself "The Underground Committee for Revenge" claimed responsibility for both attacks.
- Geoff Hunt defeated Qamar Zaman to win the 1978 Men's British Open Squash Championship at Wembley.
- In Saint Paul, Minnesota, U.S. Senator Muriel Humphrey announced that she would not run in the November election to fill the remaining four years of her late husband's term in the United States Senate. Senator Humphrey, the widow of Senator Hubert Humphrey, had been appointed to fill his Senate seat after his death on January 13.
- Born:
  - Anja Schneiderheinze, German bobsledder, winner of two-woman team bobsled in the 2006 Olympics and the world championship of 2005 and 2016; in Erfurt, East Germany
  - Bernt Haas, Swiss footballer with 36 caps for the Switzerland national team; in Vienna, Austria
  - Evans Rutto, Kenyan long-distance runner who won the Chicago Marathon in 2003 and 2004, and the London Marathon in 2004, before being injured; in Marakwet District, Kenya
  - Paola Núñez, Mexican TV actress known for Amor en custodia and the Netflix series based on Resident Evil; in Tijuana, Baja California
  - Mario Pestano, Spanish Olympic discus thrower; in Tenerife, Canary Islands, Spain
  - Rachel Roberts, Canadian model and actress; known for the science fiction comedy film S1M0NE; in Vancouver
- Died:
  - Ford C. Frick, 83, American sportswriter who served as the Commissioner of Major League Baseball from 1951 to 1965.
  - Lon L. Fuller, 75, American legal philosopher
  - Peter Igelhoff (born Rudolf August Ordnung), 73, Austrian pianist, composer and entertainer
  - Gaston Leval (born Pierre Robert Piller), 82, French historian and anarchist
  - Brendan Megraw, 23, Northern Irish Catholic civilian, was abducted from his home in Belfast by the Irish Republican Army and murdered. His remains would not be located until 36 years later, on October 1, 2014, near Kells, County Meath.
  - Kurt Voss, 77, German footballer who played 2 games for the Germany national team in 1925

== April 9, 1978 (Sunday) ==
- A group of 17 Somali military officers, led by Colonel Mohamed Osman Irro, attempted to overthrow the unpopular President of Somalia, Mohammed Siad Barre, but failed. The rebellious officers were court-martialed, found guilty and executed in October.
- Gary Player of South Africa won the 1978 Masters Tournament, the first of the year's four men's major golf championships in Augusta, Georgia. Player, who was in tenth place when the final round started, won the 72-hole tournament by a single stroke, with 277 and one better than Rod Funseth, Tom Watson, and Hubert Green, who finished with 278 strokes.
- As part of the Hundred Days' War in Lebanon, fighting took place between the Christian suburb of Ain el-Rummaneh and the Muslim suburb of Chyah, both near Beirut.

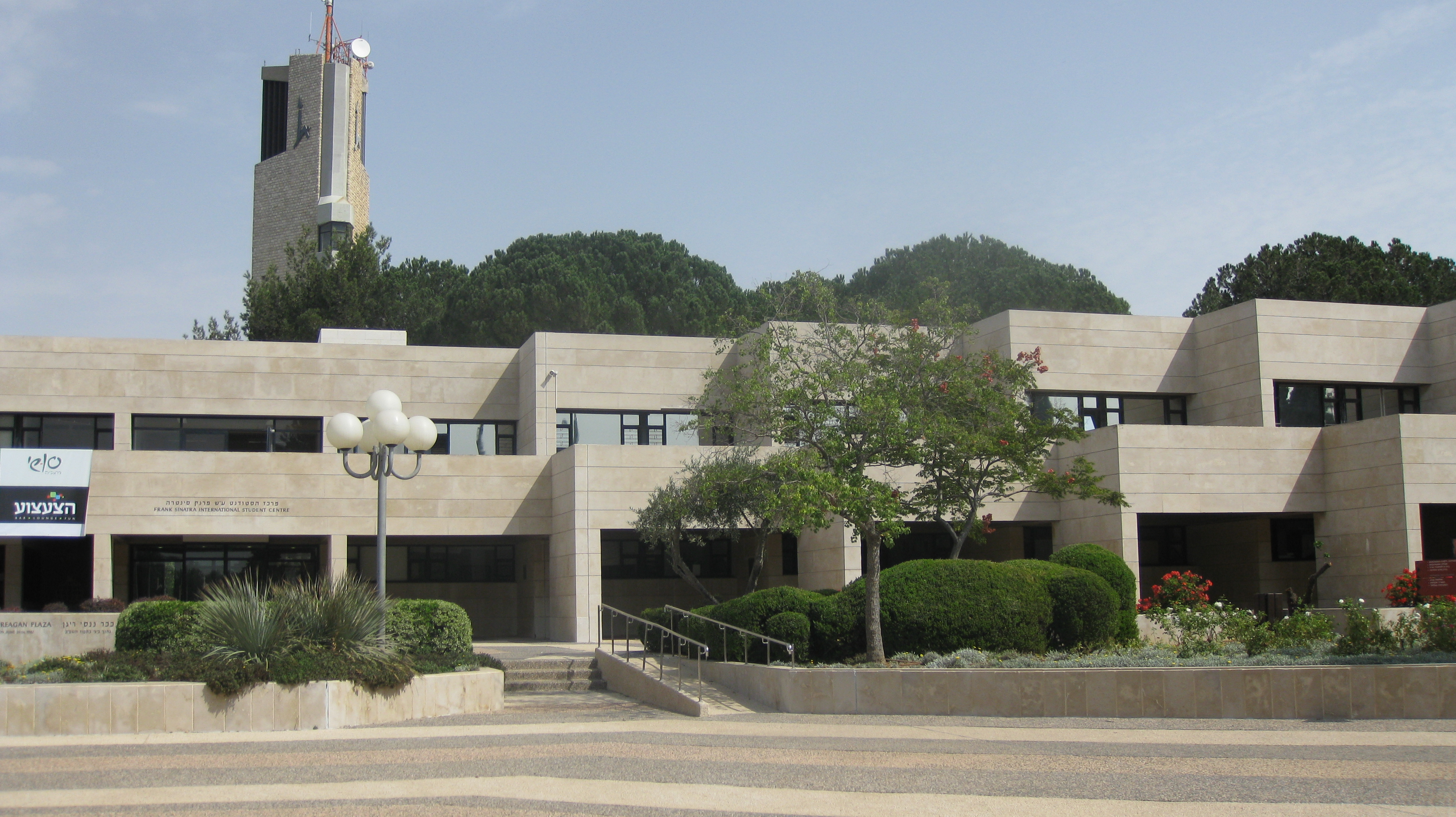
The Frank Sinatra International Student Center in 2009

- The Hebrew University of Jerusalem dedicated its Frank Sinatra International Student Center. Sinatra and his wife, Barbara Sinatra, were in attendance at the ceremony, as was actor Gregory Peck.
- In Okahandja, South West Africa, over 10,000 members of the Herero people attended the burial of Chief Clemens Kapuuo, despite fears that the cemetery was mined. Kapuuo had been assassinated the previous week.
- In the northeast United States, fires in three different apartment buildings killed a total of 16 people. In Syracuse, New York, four members of the Syracuse Fire Department – Stanley Duda, Michael Petragnani, Frank Porpiglia Jr. and Robert Schuler — were killed when the roof collapsed on them while they were searching the top floor of an apartment house after receiving an incorrect report that a woman was trapped inside. The fire had started from a candle that had been left burning by one of the residents. On the same morning, a five-member family (including two children) was killed in a predawn tenement fire in Monticello, New York. Finally, five children, their mother and a family friend died in an apartment building fire caused by arson in Lawrence, Massachusetts.
- Lee Kam of Hong Kong poisoned her family's breakfast orange juice with cyanide, killing herself and her 8- and 9-year-old sons. Her 14-year-old daughter refused her mother's order to drink the juice and called the police. Lee Kam had been upset about marital problems.
- Walter Godefroot of Belgium won the 1978 Tour of Flanders classic cycle race.
- Born:
  - Jorge Andrade, Portuguese footballer with 51 caps for the Portugal national team; in Lisbon
  - Alex Gaumond, Canadian stage and film actor; in Montreal
  - Dmitry Byakov, Kazakh footballer with 33 caps for the Kazakhstan national team; in Alma-Ata, Kazakh SSR, Soviet Union
  - Naman Keïta, French Olympic track and field athlete, part of the 4 × 400 m relay team that won the 2003 World Championships; in Paris
  - Artiom Tsepotan, Ukrainian chess International Master; in Kharkov, Ukrainian SSR, Soviet Union
  - Rachel Stevens, English singer; in Southgate, London
  - Takashi Ōhara, Japanese voice actor; in Yokohama, Japan
- Died:
  - Sir Clough Williams-Ellis, CBE, MC, 94, Welsh architect, known for designing the Portmeirion folly village in the County of Gwynedd
  - Vivian McGrath, 62, Australian tennis player, winner of the men's singles in the 1937 Australian Open
  - Elmer Woggon, 79, American comic strip artist
  - René Carol (born Gerhard Tschierschnitz), 58, German Schlager singer
  - Allan Sproul, 82, American banker, former president of the Federal Reserve Bank of New York, died of a heart attack.

== April 10, 1978 (Monday) ==
- Soviet diplomat Arkady Shevchenko, the United Nations Under-Secretary-General for Political Affairs, who had been a CIA informant since 1975, defected to the United States.

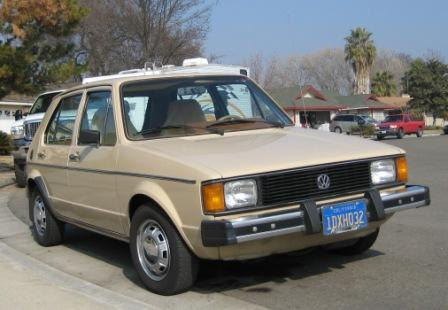
1982 Volkswagen Rabbit manufactured at the Westmoreland Assembly plant

- Volkswagen became the second non-American automobile manufacturer (after Rolls-Royce from 1921 to 1931) to produce automobiles in the United States, as the first Volkswagen Rabbit rolled off the line at the Westmoreland Assembly plant near New Stanton, Pennsylvania. The Rabbit was the North American version of the Volkswagen Golf. The plant closed in 1988.
- Christian residents of Beirut, Lebanon, fought a half-hour gun battle with Syrian peacekeeping troops that began when mourners firing rifles into the air at a funeral procession began firing on the Syrians. The previous day's fighting between Ain el-Rummaneh and Chyah tapered off but killed two more people, for a total death toll of at least seven, including a 13-year-old girl.
- L. Patrick Gray, the former Director of the FBI in the U.S., was indicted along with former Associate Director Mark Felt and a deputy, Edward S. Miller, at the direction of U.S. Attorney General Griffin Bell.
- The body of Baron Charles Bracht, a wealthy Belgian businessman who at one time had been in the Winter Olympics as an alpine skier, was found in a garbage dump in Oelegem, a suburb of Antwerp. Bracht had been kidnapped in Antwerp on March 7.
- A three-way traffic collision in Clair-Mel City, Florida, killed the driver of a tank truck and injured two other motorists. A cloud of ammonia gas escaped from the overturned truck, forcing several hundred people to evacuate.
- A blackout across most of the Canadian province of Quebec lasted for almost two hours, leaving over 1.5 million homes without power.
- The 1978 Family Circle Cup women's tennis tournament began on Hilton Head Island, South Carolina.
- Born:
  - Katja Kettu (pen name for Katja Maaria Heikkinen), Finnish novelist and film producer known for her 2011 bestseller Kätilö, translated into English in 2016 as The Midwife and the 2015 film adaptation distributed in North America as Wildeye; in Muhos
  - Rustam Saparow, Turkmenistani footballer with 17 caps for the national team
  - Joe Pack, American freestyle skier and silver medalist in the 2002 Winter Olympics; in Eugene, Oregon
- Died:
  - Hjalmar Mäe, 76, Estonian collaborationist who led the Estonian Directorate, the puppet government of Reichskommissariat Ostland during the German occupation of Estonia during World War II.
  - Irma Lindheim, 91, American Zionist fundraiser and educator
  - Endre Sík, 87, Hungarian historian and politician, former Minister of Foreign Affairs
  - Albert Vollrat, 74, Estonian footballer and wrestler, later the manager of FC Spartak Moscow whose team won the Soviet Cup in 1946 and 1947 and manager of the Estonia national team in 1932
  - Leo Michelson, 90, Latvian-American artist
  - Long John Nebel (born John Zimmerman), 66, New York City talk radio host, died of complications from cancer.

== April 11, 1978 (Tuesday) ==
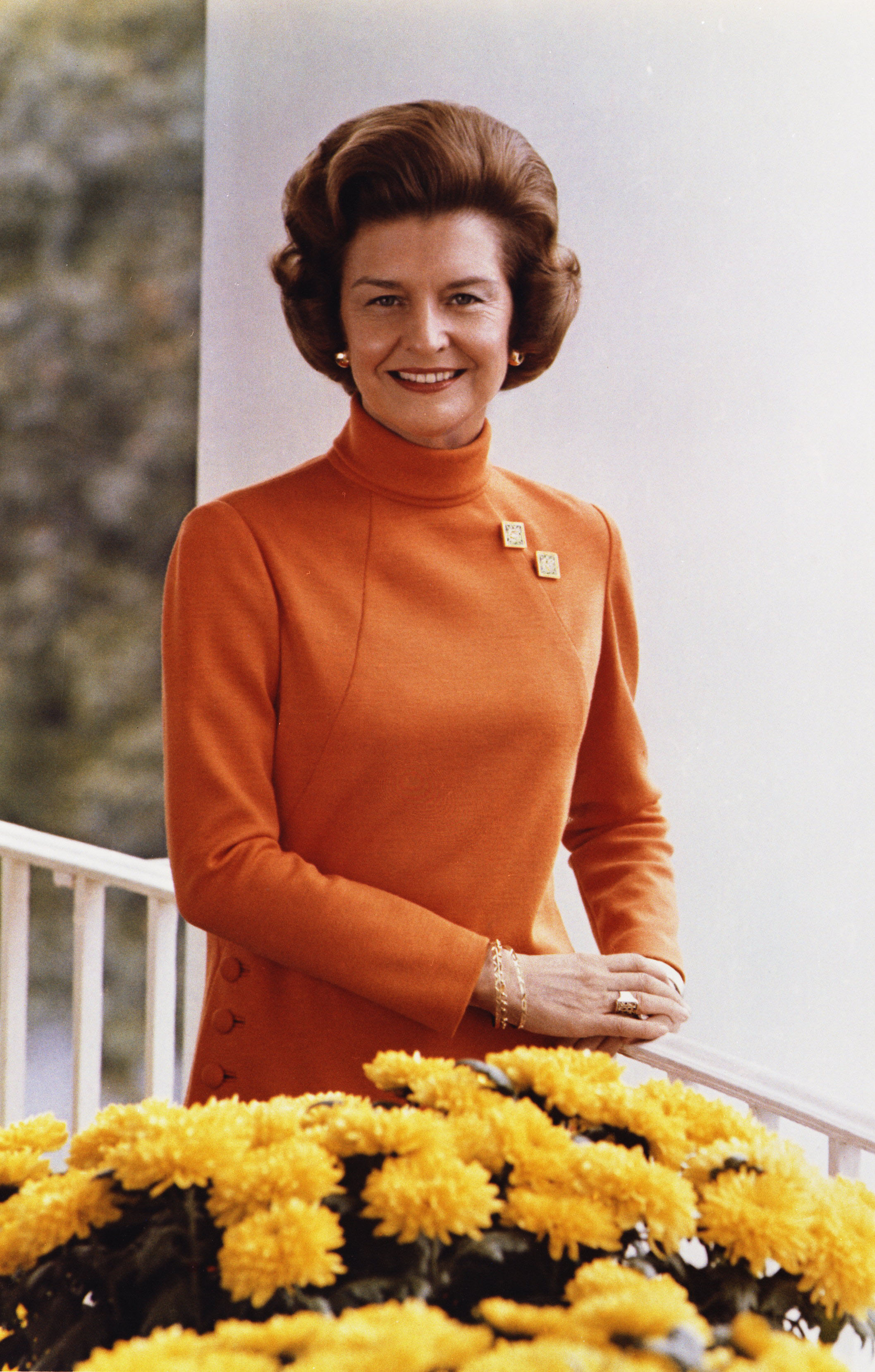
Betty Ford

- After 10 days in which former First Lady of the United States Betty Ford was in an intervention by her family for substance abuse, including an addiction to alcohol and prescription narcotics, and Mrs. Ford's public acknowledgment of her problem, she checked herself in to a rehabilitation program at the Naval Regional Medical Center in Long Beach, California. Her public admission of an addiction problem would help remove the social stigma of seeking help for substance abuse, and lead to the establishment of the Betty Ford Center in 1982.
- Former National Basketball Association player John Brisker telephoned his girlfriend in Seattle, Washington, supposedly from Africa, where he had traveled to launch an import-export business. This was the last known communication with Brisker, who would be declared legally dead in May 1985.
- Born:
  - Yury Maksimov, Russian entrepreneur and co-founder and the first CEO of Positive Technologies; in Fryazino, Moscow Oblast, Russian SFSR, Soviet Union
  - Mychael Knight, African-American fashion designer, American parents in Nuremberg, West Germany
  - Brett Claywell, American actor known for One Tree Hill and One Life to Live; in Greensboro, North Carolina
  - Marie Gaspard, French slalom canoeist and winner of the 2006 World Championship; in Remiremont
  - Ben Clymer, American NHL ice hockey defenceman; in Edina, Minnesota
  - Josh Hancock, American MLB baseball pitcher; in Cleveland, Mississippi (killed in auto accident, 2007)
  - Kevin Hulsmans, Belgian road bicycle racer; in Lommel
- Died:
  - Ian MacDonald (stage name for Ulva Pippy), 63, American actor known as the villain Frank Miller in the film High Noon
  - George C. Cory Jr., 57, American pianist and composer known for the melody for "I Left My Heart in San Francisco", committed suicide by drug overdose.
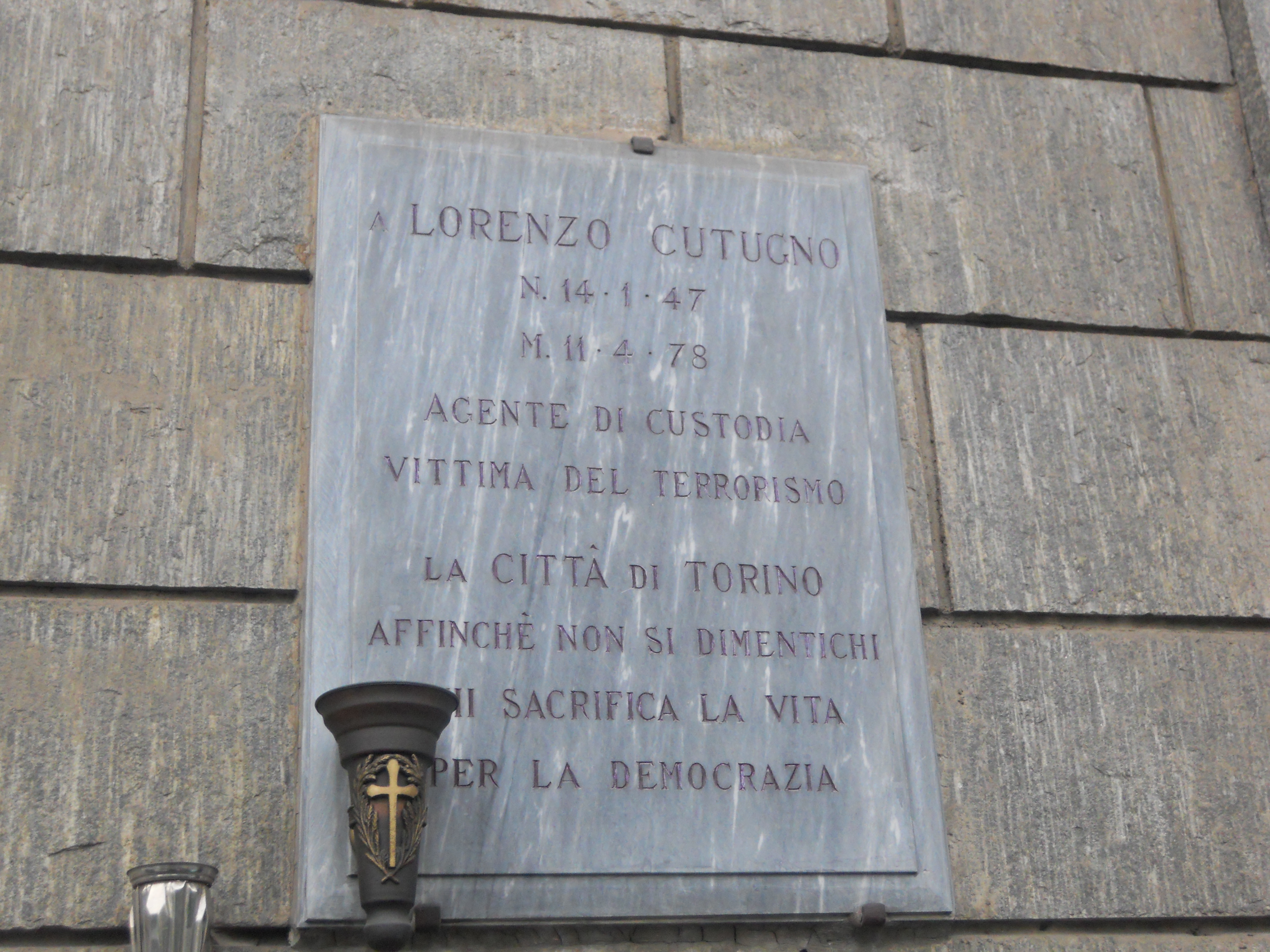
    Plaque in Turin commemorating Lorenzo Cutugno
  - Lorenzo Cutugno, 31, Italian policeman for the Polizia Penitenziaria, was ambushed and killed by the Red Brigades terrorist group in Turin.

== April 12, 1978 (Wednesday) ==
- The Supreme Soviet of the RSFSR (the Russian Soviet Federative Socialist Republic), the largest of the 15 constituent republics of the USSR, adopted the Russian Constitution of 1978. As with the subnational constitutions adopted by other member states of the USSR, the purpose was consistency to bring the principles of the 1977 Constitution of the Soviet Union to each republic's laws.
- The opera Le Grand Macabre, composed by György Ligeti, received its world premiere at the Königliche Oper Stockholm.
- The foreign ministers of India and Pakistan signed a bilateral agreement to jointly build the Salal Dam, a hydroelectric power project to bring electricity to the disputed Kashmir region, claimed by both nations, with India administering the state of Jammu and Kashmir, and Pakistan governing the Azad Jammu Kashmir province.
- In a racist hate crime, Betty Gardner, a 33-year-old African American woman, was raped, tortured and murdered in Saint Helena Island, South Carolina, by four white people who picked her up while she was hitchhiking. John Arnold, who had suggested killing her, and John Plath, who helped another woman would be convicted of her murder in February 1979; both of them would be executed by lethal injection in 1998. The execution was a rare instance of white perpetrators in the U.S. being executed for the murder of a black victim. According to a 2020 Associated Press report, in the 42 years that followed the 1977 resumption of executions in the U.S., "295 Black defendants were executed for killing a white victim, but only 21 white defendants were executed for the killing of a Black victim even though Black people are disproportionately the victims of crime."
- Born:
  - Stanislav Angelov, Bulgarian footballer with 39 caps for the Bulgaria national team; in Sofia
  - Luca Argentero, Italian actor nominated for the David di Donatello for best actor for Different from Whom?, and star of Solo un padre; in Turin
  - Guy Berryman, Scottish musician and bassist for the rock band Coldplay; in Kirkcaldy, Fife
  - Christos Poyiatzis, Cypriot footballer with 6 caps for the Cyprus national team; in Famagustas
  - Andrés San Martín, Argentine footballer; in Lomas de Zamora, Buenos Aires Province
  - Riley Smith, American TV actor known for the CW series Nancy Drew; in Cedar Rapids, Iowa
  - Linda Ogugua, Nigerian Olympic basketball player; in Anambra State, Nigeria
  - Svetlana Lapina, Russian Olympic high jumper; in Makhachkala, Dagestan Autonomous Soviet Socialist Republic, Russian SFSR, Soviet Union
  - John DeFilippo, pro football head coach for the minor United Football League; in Youngstown, Ohio

== April 13, 1978 (Thursday) ==
- Sixteen people were killed at Amritsar in India's Punjab state, when rival sects of the Sikh religion fought each other at a convention in Amritsar of members of the Sant Nirankari Mission. Gurbachan Singh, the guru and leader of the Sant Nirankari sect, had obtained permission from the Punjab state government to hold a public celebration of the founding of the Khalsa religious order. At the same time, the leaders of two of the more traditional Sikh groups— Fauja Singh of the Akhand Kirtani Jatha and Jarnail Singh Bhindranwale of the Damdami Taksal — marched with 200 people from the Golden Temple toward the gathering of the Nirankaris, after which the clash ensued, leaving 16 of the traditional Sikhs and three of the Nirankaris dead.
- The 43rd Amendment to the Constitution of India, restoring human rights that had been taken away in 1977 during the administration of Indira Gandhi, took effect upon ratification by 18 of India's 22 states, and repealed the 42nd Amendment, which had added six articles that had given India's Parliament broad power to enforce Gandhi's decrees, and prohibited the India Supreme Court from declaring a law unconstitutional.
- The first of three assassination attempts against Spanish politician José Larrañaga Arenas took place in Spain in San Sebastián in the province of Gipuzkoa. Larrañaga was wounded when two people shot him from a car, fracturing his left leg. Earlier in the day, an early-morning attempted car bombing at the offices of ADEGUI (Asociación Democrática Empresarial de Guipúzcoa) injured one of the perpetrators, who surrendered to French authorities after fleeing across the border. Larrañaga was wounded in the chest in a second shooting on April 10, 1980, and the third assassination attempt by the Basque ETA terrorist group, on December 31, 1984, would be successful.
- In the course of the "Dirty War" in Argentina, lawyer and Montoneros activist Eduardo Héctor Garat, 32, was kidnapped on a street corner in the city of Rosario, Santa Fe, and became one of the many desaparecidos who disappeared and were never heard from again.
- Born:
  - Carles Puyol, Spanish footballer with 100 caps for the Spain national team from 2000 to 2013, and 392 for FC Barcelona in La Liga, winner of the One Club Man Award (2018) and the Don Balón Award for La Liga's breakthrough player (2001); in La Pobla de Segur, Catalonia
  - Kyle Howard, American TV actor, star of WB's Run of the House and Your Family or Mine on TBS; in Loveland, Colorado
  - Farrukh Amonatov, Tajikistani chess grandmaster; in Dushanbe, Tajik SSR, Soviet Union
  - Antoni Sivera, Andorran footballer with 22 caps for the Andorra national team
  - Arron Asham, Canadian NHL ice hockey right winger; in Portage la Prairie, Manitoba
- Died:
  - Paul McGrath, 74, American radio, film, stage and TV actor best known for the NBC radio program My Son Jeep
  - Funmilayo Ransome-Kuti, 77, Nigerian suffragist and women's rights activist, died from injuries suffered on February 18, 1977, from being thrown out of window by Nigerian government soldiers.
  - Violetta Thurstan, 99, English wartime nurse during World War One and author of Field Hospital and Flying Column
  - Jack Chambers, 47, Canadian artist and filmmaker
  - William Rees-Thomas CB FRCP FRSM, 90, Welsh psychiatrist
  - Ernst Bantle, 77, German international footballer

== April 14, 1978 (Friday) ==
- Thousands of Georgians demonstrated in Tbilisi, capital of the Georgian Soviet Socialist Republic, one of the 15 republics of the USSR, to protest an attempt by government of the Soviet Union to change the status of the Georgian language from being Georgia's sole official language, and adding Russian as the primary form for documents. Georgian Communist Party First Secretary Eduard Shevardnadze was able to persuade Leonid Brezhnev and the Central Committee of the Soviet Communist Party to drop its efforts to make Russian universal. April 14 is now celebrated as the Day of the Georgian Language.
- In Rhodesia, nine black ministers were sworn in to serve on the Ministerial Council of the Transitional Government.
- Abel Mthembu, former deputy president of the African National Congress in the Transvaal, was murdered after turning state witness at the Pretoria ANC trial.
- In India, the government-controlled Samachar News Agency, created in 1976 by the forcible merger of the four independent agencies, was dissolved and split into its four original organizations, reviving United News of India, Press Trust of India (PTI), Hindustan Samachar and Samachar Bharati.
- Born:
  - Toni Söderholm, Finnish ice hockey defenceman and coach, winner of trophies in Finland's Liiga for rookie of the year (2003), best defenseman (2004), best player in the playoffs (2011) and most effective player (2012); in Kauniainen
  - Tony Bombardieri, Italian Olympic figure skater, winner of the Italian championship in 1997 and 1998; in Bergamo
  - Roland Lessing, Estonian Olympic biathlete; in Tartu, Estonian SSR, Soviet Union
  - Georgina Harland, British Olympic modern pentathlete; in Canterbury, Kent, England
  - Louisy Joseph (born Lydy Louisy-Joseph), French singer; in Vénissieux, Lyon Metropolis, France
  - Sorin Botiș, Romanian footballer; in Arad, Romania
- Died:
  - Joe Gordon, 63, American MLB baseball player, 1942 MVP of the American League, 2009 posthumous inductee to the Baseball Hall of Fame
  - Mauk Weber, 64, Dutch footballer with 27 caps for the Netherlands national team in the 1930s
  - F. R. Leavis CH, 82, English literary critic
  - Arline Pretty, 92, American silent film actress known as the star of Tipped Off (1923) and co-star in The Girl on the Stairs (1924)
  - James McKee, 61, and Robert McCullough, 27, in separate incidents in Northern Ireland; McKee, a Protestant member of the Ulster Defence Regiment, was shot and killed by the Irish Republican Army while driving a school bus in Creggan, County Tyrone and McCullough was shot and killed by the Ulster Volunteer Force at his home in Newtownabbey, County Antrim.

== April 15, 1978 (Saturday) ==
- The derailment of two trains in Italy killed 48 people and injured 117 others near the town of Murazze di Vado in the Province of Bologna. Express train 572-B had been traveling north from Florence to Bologna, while the train Rapido 813 was traveling south from Bolzano toward Rome. Shortly after noon, Train 572-B derailed after heavy rain caused a landslide to spill over the railroad, and several cars plunged into a ravine, while a locomotive was pushed across both the northbound and southbound tracks. Minutes later, Rapido 813 crashed into 572-B's derailed engine. Two engineers on 572-B were killed, while the front four passenger cars of Rapido 813 fell into a ravine, killing 46 of the people on board.
- Four people were killed and 31 injured at the Squaw Valley Ski Resort in the U.S. state of California when the aerial car on which they were riding came off one of its cables and dropped 75 feet (23 m). On the way down, it collided with another cable that sheared through the car.
- The Freedom From Religion Foundation was incorporated as a nonprofit organization by Anne Nicol Gaylor in Madison, Wisconsin. As of 2024, it claimed 36,000 members.

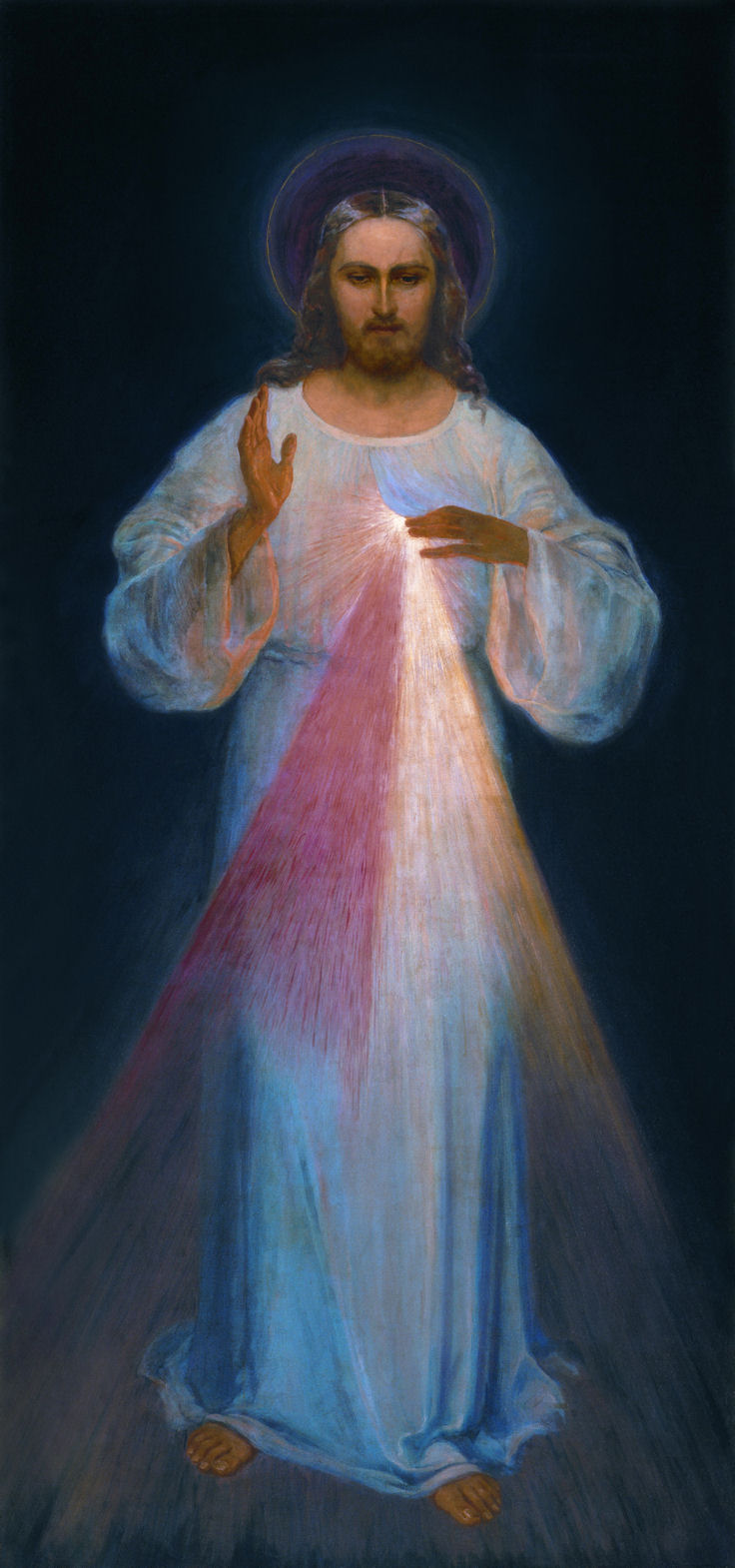
Divine Mercy by Eugeniusz Kazimirowski

- Pope Paul VI lifted a 19-year ban against display and veneration of the image of the Divine Mercy (Miłosierdzia Bożego) in Poland, a practice that had been started in 1934 by Sister Faustina Kowalska after her vision of Jesus Christ and her recording in her diary of the initial vision and later encounters. Images had been painted by Eugeniusz Kazimirowski in 1934 and by Adolf Hyla.
- West Germany's knockout football cup competition, the DFB-Pokal, was won by 1. FC Köln, 2 to 0, over Fortuna Düsseldorf after starting with 128 competitors. The championship game was played in front of 70,000 people at the Parkstadion in Gelsenkirchen.
- The 1978 European Badminton Championships, played in Preston, Lancashire, England, concluded after three days, with England winning three of the events and Denmark two.
- Born:
  - Chris Stapleton, American country singer, guitarist and songwriter, winner of 10 Grammy Awards, 11 Academy of Country Music (ACM) Awards, and 15 Country Music Association (CMA) Awards; in Lexington, Kentucky
  - Luis Fonsi, Puerto Rican singer and songwriter, 2017 American Music Award winner for favorite pop/rock song for "Despacito"; in San Juan, Puerto Rico
  - Helena Costa, Portuguese football manager who coached the Qatar national women's team (2010–2012) and the Iran national women's team (2012–2014); in Alhandra, São João dos Montes e Calhandriz, Vila Franca de Xira, Portugal
  - Soumaïla Coulibaly, Malian footballer with 57 caps for the Mali national team; in Bamako
  - Giorgi Latso (stage name for Giorgi Latsabidze), Georgian-born American concert pianist and composer; in Tbilisi, Georgian SSR, Soviet Union
- Died:
  - Frank Tallman, 58, American stunt pilot, was killed in a plane crash.
  - Olan Mills Sr., 78, American photographer and entrepreneur who founded, with his wife, the traveling Olan Mills portrait photography service, died of head injuries sustained in a fall.

== April 16, 1978 (Sunday) ==
- The Khaleej Times, the first English-language daily newspaper in the United Arab Emirates, began publication.
- Three British mountaineers— Jimmy Jewell, Joe Brown and Dave Cuthbertson — became the first persons to climb "the Flytrap", the 679-foot (207 m) vertical mountainside of the Great Orme in Scotland.
- Francesco Moser of Italy won the 1978 Paris–Roubaix cycle race, covering 263 kilometres (163 mi) in 7 hours and 12 minutes.
- Chris Evert won the singles title at the 1978 Family Circle Cup tennis tournament.
- Born:
  - Matthew Lloyd, Australian rules footballer and three-time winner of the Coleman Medal (2000, 2001 and 2003) for most goals scored in a season, inductee to the Australian Football Hall of Fame; in Melbourne
  - Ivan Urgant, popular Russian actor and late night television host; in Leningrad, Russian SFSR, Soviet Union (now Saint Petersburg, Russia)
  - Igor Tudor, Croatian footballer with 55 caps for the Croatia national team from 1997 to 2006; in Split, SR Croatia, SFR Yugoslavia
  - Lara Dutta, Indian beauty pageant contestant and film actress who was Miss Universe 2000, winner of the 2003 Filmfare Award for Best Female Debut; in Ghaziabad, Uttar Pradesh state
  - Yelena Prokhorova, Russian Olympic heptathlete, winner of the 2001 World champion in the women's heptathlon; in Kemerovo, Russian SFSR, Soviet Union
  - Hailu Negussie, Ethiopian marathon runner, winner of the 2005 Boston Marathon
  - Lucie Borhyová, Czech newscaster for TV Nova; in Prague, Czechoslovakia
- Died:
  - Philibert Tsiranana, 65, the first President of Madagascar, from 1959 to 1972
  - Lucius D. Clay, 79, American military governor of the U.S. Zone of Germany after World War II, architect of the Berlin Airlift in 1948 after the Soviet Union closed all corridors to West Berlin
  - Nagamichi Kuroda, 88, Japanese ornithologist
  - Fay Inchfawn (pen name for Elizabeth Rebecca Ward), 97, English writer of children's books, religious tracts and popular verse
  - Richard Lindner, 76, German-American painter
  - Gerald Dunning, 72, British archaeologist
  - Ralph Bushman, 74, American actor and son of Francis X. Bushman
  - Eddie Morgan, 64, Wales international rugby union player for the Wales and British Isles teams
  - Michael Lerner, 87, American businessman and co-founder of the Lerner Shops chain of women's stores, later a renowned sports fisherman, died of cancer.
  - John Sines, 63, American professional basketball player

== April 17, 1978 (Monday) ==
- The World Health Organization (WHO) branch office in Nairobi, Kenya, sent a telegram to the world headquarters about the results of searches of houses after the 1977 outbreak of smallpox, with the message, "Search complete. No cases discovered. Ali Maow Maalin is the world's last known smallpox case." On October 26, 1979, WHO would be able to declare the disease completely eradicated.
- Mir Akbar Khyber, the popular leader of a left-wing faction of the People's Democratic Party of Afghanistan (PDPA), was assassinated outside his home in Kabul, apparently on the orders of Afghan President Mohammad Daoud Khan. Khyber's death, and protests by angry PDPA sympathizers at his funeral on April 19, would lead to the Saur Revolution and the bloody coup d'état on April 28 that would overthrow President Daoud's government.
- The "Malatya massacre", an attack on the Alevi Muslims in the city of Malatya in Turkey, began after the assassination earlier in the day of the city's mayor, Hamit Fendoğlu. A package had been sent to Fendoğlu's house and contained a bomb which exploded, killing him, his daughter-in-law, and two grandchildren. While there was no proof of involvement of the Alevi Muslim minority, a group of Sunni Muslims targeted the homes of Alevis with red X marks, and then attacked the marked buildings after darkness fell. Over the next three days, 8 people were killed, hundreds injured and 960 workplaces and houses were destroyed.
- Argentinian author and left-wing activist Jacobo Timerman was released from prison a year after his April 15, 1977, incarceration, and moved to house arrest at this home on Ayacucho Street in Buenos Aires. Deported to Israel in 1979, Timerman would recount his experience in the 1981 bestseller Prisoner Without a Name, Cell Without a Number.
- The Best Little Whorehouse in Texas, a musical with music and lyrics by Carol Hall, was staged for the first time, appearing off-Broadway at the Entermedia Theatre in Manhattan before moving to Broadway on June 19 for the first of 1,584 performances.
- Born:
  - Jason White, Scottish rugby union player with 77 caps for the Scotland national team; in Edinburgh
  - Kyaw Kyaw Bo, Myanma film actor and singer, 2018 Myanmar Academy Award winner for best supporting actor for Clinging with Hate; in Rangoon, Burma (now Yangon, Myanmar)
  - Hannu Manninen, Finnish Nordic combined skier and member of the teams that won an Olympic gold medal (2002) and three world championship medals (1999 and 2007); in Rovaniemi, Finland
  - David Murdoch, Scottish curler with two world championship gold medals (2006 and 2009); in Dumfries
  - Monika Bergmann-Schmuderer (born Monika Bergmann), German Olympic alpine skier and 2005 World Champion gold medalist; in Lam, Bavaria, West Germany
  - Loukas Louka, Cypriot footballer with 29 caps for the Cyprus national team; in Larnaca
  - Juan Guillermo Castillo, Uruguayan footballer with 13 caps for the Uruguay national team; in Montevideo
- Died:
  - Ewald Balser, 79, German film actor
  - Ethel Bartlett, 83, British pianist who performed as a team with her husband, Rae Robertson, between 1924 and 1956

== April 18, 1978 (Tuesday) ==
- The United States Senate voted, 68–32, to ratify the Panama Canal Treaty, agreeing to turn the Panama Canal over to Panamanian control on December 31, 1999.

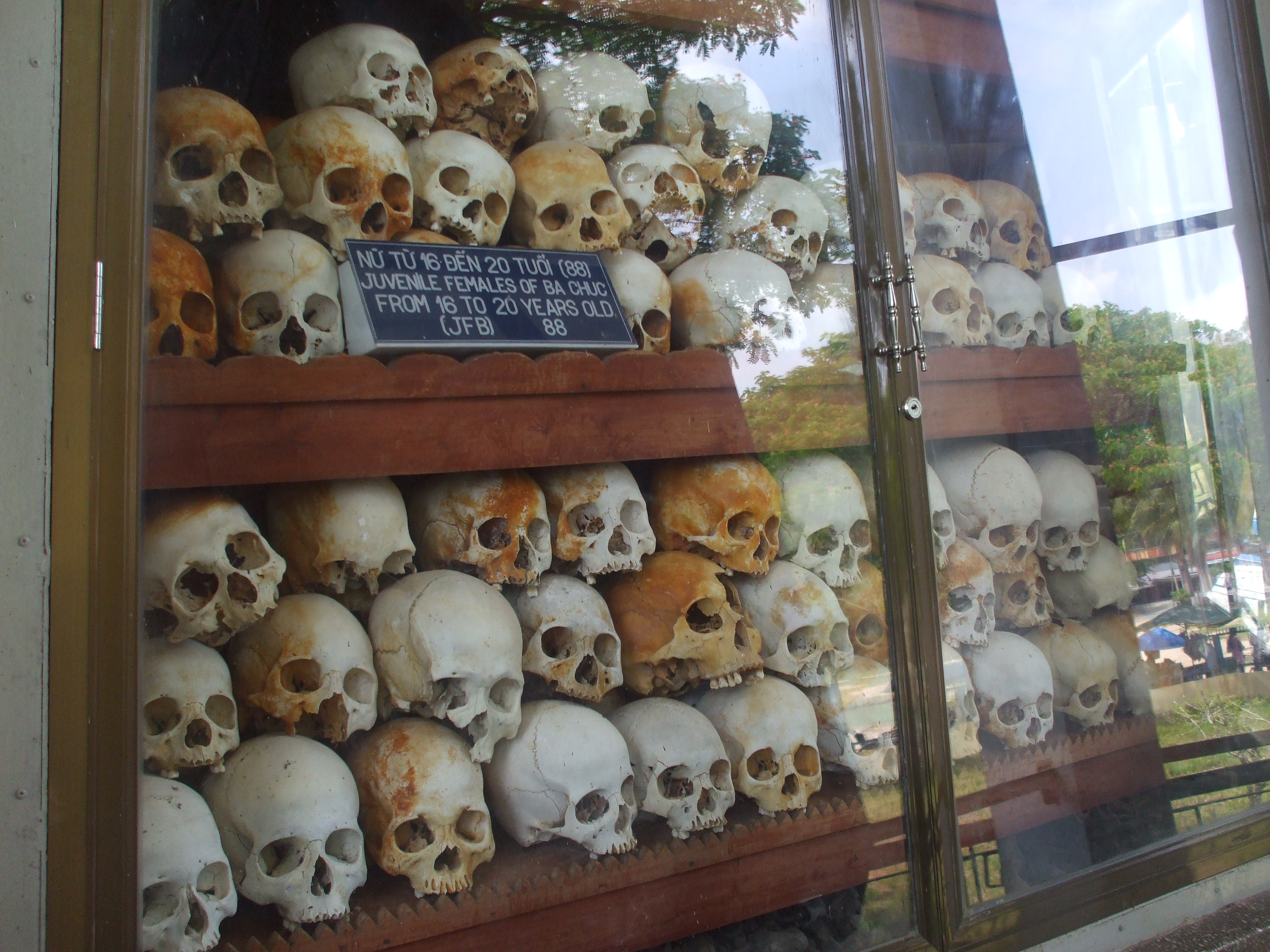
A display of skulls of the Ba Chuc victims

- Pol Pot, the Chairman of the Khmer Rouge and the government of Democratic Kampuchea (formerly Cambodia), sent the Revolutionary Army of Kampuchea on an invasion of Vietnam with a surprise attack on border towns. Over the next 12 days, until the Kampucheans were forced back by the People's Army of Viet Nam, thousands of civilians were massacred in and around the former South Vietnamese town of Ba Chúc, at An Giang Province.
- Police in Rome received a communication from Italy's Red Brigades terrorist group that announced that kidnapped former prime minister Aldo Moro was dead and that his body had been dropped into a mountain lake, the Lago della Duchessa, in the province of Rieti. Police searched the lake and concluded that the message had been false. Moro was still alive, though he would be murdered three weeks later by his captors.
- Born:
  - Ryōta Tsuzuki, Japanese footballer and goalkeeper with six caps for the Japan national team; in Heguri, Nara prefecture
  - Dias Caires (born Yahenda Joaquim Caires Fernandes), Angolan footballer
  - Dedé (born Leonardo de Deus Santos), Brazilian footballer; in Belo Horizonte, Brazil
  - Ryan Gardner, Canadian-born Swiss professional ice hockey forward; in Toronto, Ontario, Canada
  - Mehdi Leroy, French footballer; in Saint-Nazaire, France
  - Malcolm Licari, Maltese footballer; in Pietà, Malta
  - Baran bo Odar, German film and television director and screenwriter; in Olten, Switzerland
  - Luciano Pagliarini, Brazilian Olympic cyclist; in Arapongas, Paraná, Brazil
  - Maxim Podoprigora, Austrian Olympic swimmer; in Kiev, Ukrainian SSR, Soviet Union
  - Vanja Rupena, Croatian model; in Koper, Socialist Republic of Slovenia, SFR Yugoslavia
- Died:
  - Sobha Singh (born Sardar Bahadur), 90, Sikh Indian city planner who oversaw the growth and planning of the city of Delhi.
  - Rudolf Bonnet, 83, Dutch artist

== April 19, 1978 (Wednesday) ==
- Eight members of the United Nations Interim Force in Lebanon (UNIFIL) were killed when the South Lebanon Army (SLA), a Lebanese Christian paramilitary organization commanded by Major Saad Haddad, ordered shelling of UNIFIL headquarters.
- Israel's 120-member parliament, the Knesset, held a vote to select the fifth President of Israel. Yitzhak Navon, unopposed, required at least 61 votes; 86 were cast for him and 23 blank votes were submitted by Knesset members, while another 11 members declined to vote.
- The Uzbek Soviet Socialist Republic, one of the 15 constituent republics of the USSR, adopted a new constitution.
- In the finish of the playoff of Spain's futbol league, La Liga, FC Barcelona defeated UD Las Palmas, 3 to 1, to win the Copa del Rey, also called the Spanish Cup. Barcelona finished second to Real Madrid in La Liga and Las Palmas finished in seventh place.
- More than nine years after the Farmington Mine disaster that killed 78 coal miners in the U.S. state of West Virginia, the Consolidation Coal Company announced that it was ceasing further recovery efforts for the 19 remaining bodies still inside Mine Number 9. The site of the tragedy was then sealed as a permanent tomb.
- Hundreds of people rallied at the Minnesota State Capitol in Saint Paul against the proposed repeal of the gay rights provision in the city's human rights ordinance.
- Born:
  - James Franco, American film and actor, winner of the Golden Globe Award for Best Actor for The Disaster Artist (2017) and for the 2001 TV film James Dean; in Palo Alto, California
  - Joanna Gaines, American interior designer, TV personality and author who co-hosted (with her husband Chip Gaines) the U.S. cable TV series Fixer Upper; as Joanna Stevens in Wichita, Kansas
  - Gorka Brit, Spanish footballer; in San Sebastián, Gipuzkoa
  - Giulia Casoni, Italian tennis player; in Ferrara, Italy
  - Gabriel Heinze, Argentinean footballer; in Crespo, Entre Ríos, Argentina
  - Jeanne Herry, French filmmaker and actress
  - Amber Lawrence, Australian country music singer-songwriter; in Mascot, New South Wales, Australia
  - Dorothee Mantel, German politician; in Bamberg, West Germany
  - Flavio Medina, Mexican actor; in Mexico City, Mexico
  - Geordan Murphy, Irish rugby union player and coach; in Dublin, Ireland
  - Amanda Sage, American painter; in Denver, Colorado
- Died:
  - Nils Lie, 75, Norwegian novelist known for the 1923 crime thriller Bergenstoget plyndret i natt ("They plundered the Bergen train last night!")
  - Taavi "Dave" Komonen, 79, Finnish-born Canadian long-distance runner and winner of the 1934 Boston Marathon

== April 20, 1978 (Thursday) ==
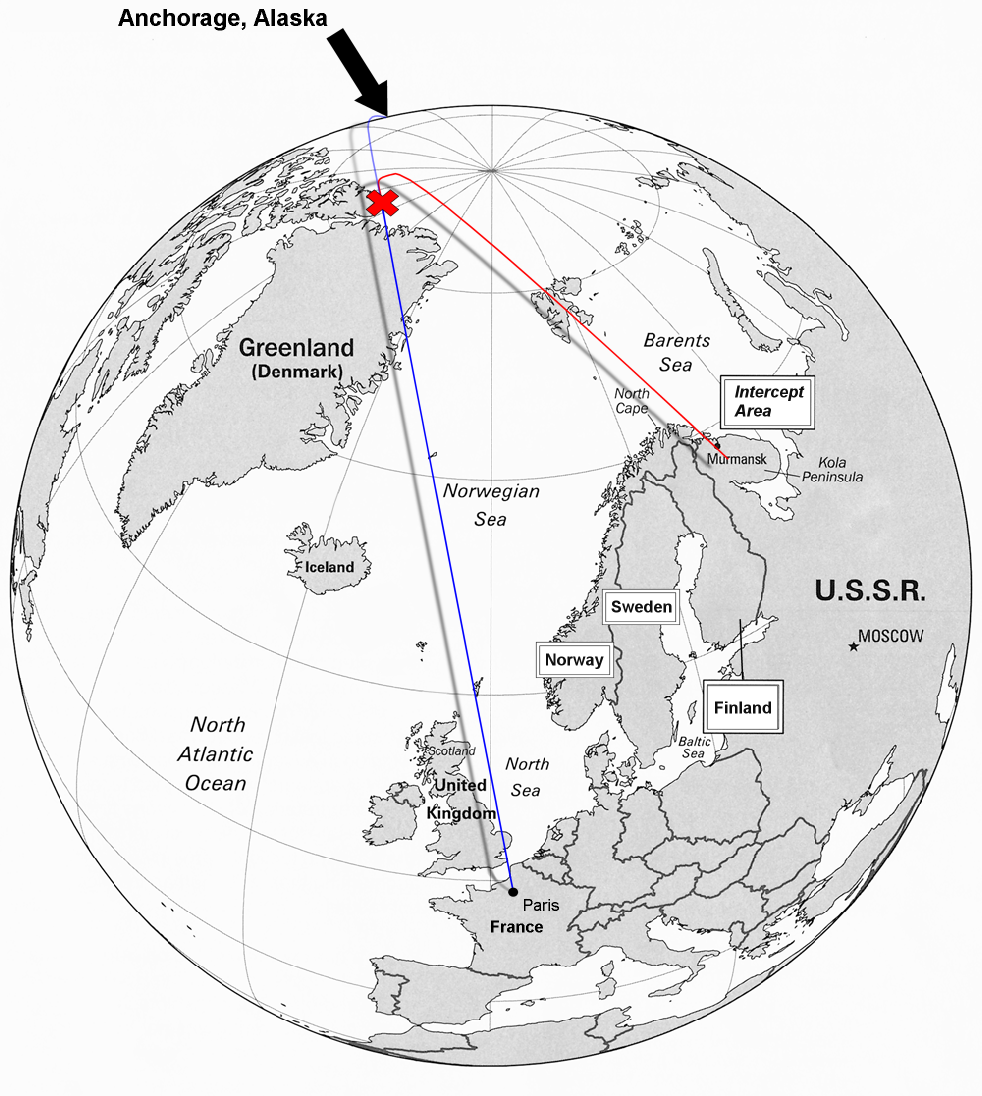
Flight path of Korean Air Lines Flight 902

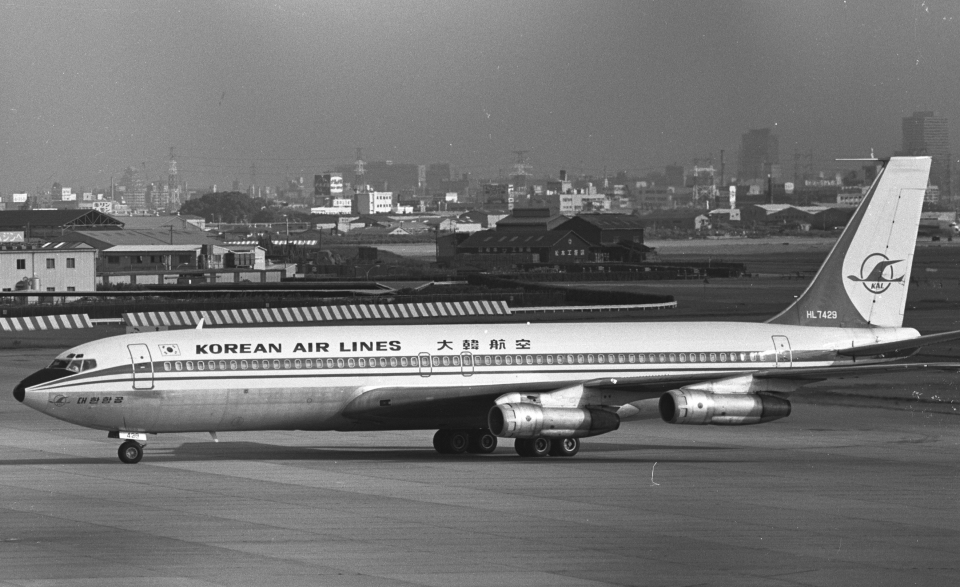
The Boeing 707 involved in the shootdown in August 1977

- A Soviet air defense plane shot down Korean Air Lines Flight 902 after the Boeing 707 strayed into Soviet airspace during its flight from Anchorage, Alaska, to Seoul, South Korea, after originating in Paris. The plane made an emergency landing on a frozen lake, killing two passengers.
- In Italy, the Red Brigades terrorist group assassinated Major Marshal Francesco Di Cataldo, 51, a high-ranking official and deputy commander of the San Vittore Prison in Crescenzago, near Milan.
- Michel Laurent of France won the 1978 La Flèche Wallonne cycle race.
- The 1978 Atlantic Coast Conference baseball tournament began at Beautiful Tiger Field in Clemson, South Carolina.
- Around 150 people attended a debate in the Great Hall of Cooper Union, at which graphic designer Massimo Vignelli and cartographer John Tauranac discussed their proposed designs for the map of New York City's subway system. A version of Tauranac's map was adopted in 1979 and is still in use.
- Born:
  - Clayne Crawford (stage name for William Joseph Crawford), American actor known for the TV series Rectify and Lethal Weapon; in Clay, Alabama
  - Lord Richard Cecil, 30, British freelance journalist and war correspondent, was shot and killed by a member of the Zimbabwe African National Liberation Army.
  - Jack Graney, 91, Canadian-born U.S. major league baseball player and broadcaster.
  - Mathew Hayman, Australian road bicycle racer; in Camperdown, New South Wales, Australia
  - David Karanka, Spanish footballer; in Vitoria-Gasteiz, Álava, Spain
  - Lauri Pyykönen, Finnish Olympic cross-country skier; in Pirkkala, Finland
  - Alessandro Rigotti, Italian voice actor; in Turin, Italy
  - Carlos Rodríguez, Venezuelan Olympic fencer
  - David Sánchez, Spanish tennis player; in Zamora, Spain
  - Kunihiko Takizawa, Japanese footballer; in Fuchū, Tokyo, Japan
  - Edvaldo Valério, Brazilian Olympic swimmer; in Salvador, Bahia, Brazil
  - Stefan Wächter, German footballer and coach; in Herne, North Rhine-Westphalia, West Germany
- Died:
  - Jean Babelon, 89, French librarian, historian and numismatist
  - Moses Kunitz, 90, Russian-born American biochemist
  - Ferdinand Peroutka, 83, Czech journalist and writer

== April 21, 1978 (Friday) ==
- Krystyna Chojnowska-Liskiewicz of Poland became the first woman to sail around the world by herself, arriving back at Las Palmas in the Canary Islands more than two years after her departure from there on March 28, 1976, on the sloop sailboat Mazurek. During her voyage, she traveled 35,865 miles (57,719 km).
- U.S. President Jimmy Carter announced that he would reduce the number of U.S. troops in South Korea by two-thirds by the end of the year, after being unable to get Congress to approve a budget for a compensatory aid package for the South Korean government.
- Born:
  - Yuliya Pechonkina, Russian track and field athlete, 2005 world champion in the women's 400m hurdles; in Krasnoyarsk, Russian SFSR, Soviet Union
  - Jacob Burns, Australian soccer player with 11 caps for the Australia national team; in Sydney
  - David Smith, Scottish adaptive rower and gold medalist in the 2012 Paralympic Games and the 2009 and 2011 World Championships; in Dunfermline, Fife
  - Glen Berry, British actor known as the co-star of the 1996 romantic comedy Beautiful Thing; in Romford, Greater London
- Died:
  - Sandy Denny, 31, British singer-songwriter, died from a head injury and intracerebral hemorrhage.
  - Robert de Nesle, 71, French film producer
  - Thomas Wyatt Turner, PhD, 101, American civil rights activist, biologist and educator

== April 22, 1978 (Saturday) ==
- The One Love Peace Concert was held at The National Stadium in Kingston, Jamaica. Bob Marley united two opposing political leaders, Michael Manley and Edward Seaga, at this concert, attempting to bring peace to the civil war-ridden streets of the city.
- In Canada, Edmonton became the first city in North America to begin operation of a light rail transit system, Edmonton LRT.
- Izhar Cohen & The Alphabeta won the Eurovision Song Contest 1978 for Israel with their song "A-Ba-Ni-Bi".
- Adventure World (Shirahama Adobenchā Wārudo), a Japanese combination of zoo, aquarium and amusement park, opened in the town of Shirahama, Wakayama prefecture, as Nanki Shirahama World Safari.
- Colombian professional boxer Rodrigo Valdez, the WBA world midleweight champion since 1974 and the undisputed champion of the WBA and WBC since 1977, lost the first defense of his title, beaten by points after a 15-round bout against Hugo Corro of Argentina in Sanremo in Italy.
- Dundalk defeated Cork Alberts on a penalty shootout to win the League of Ireland Cup, when the two teams remained tied, 4 to 4 on aggregate, after extra time. In the first game, played at Dundalk, the 2–2 draw, and the teams had played another 2–2 draw at Cork. On the shoot-out, Dundalk outshot Cork, 4 to 2.

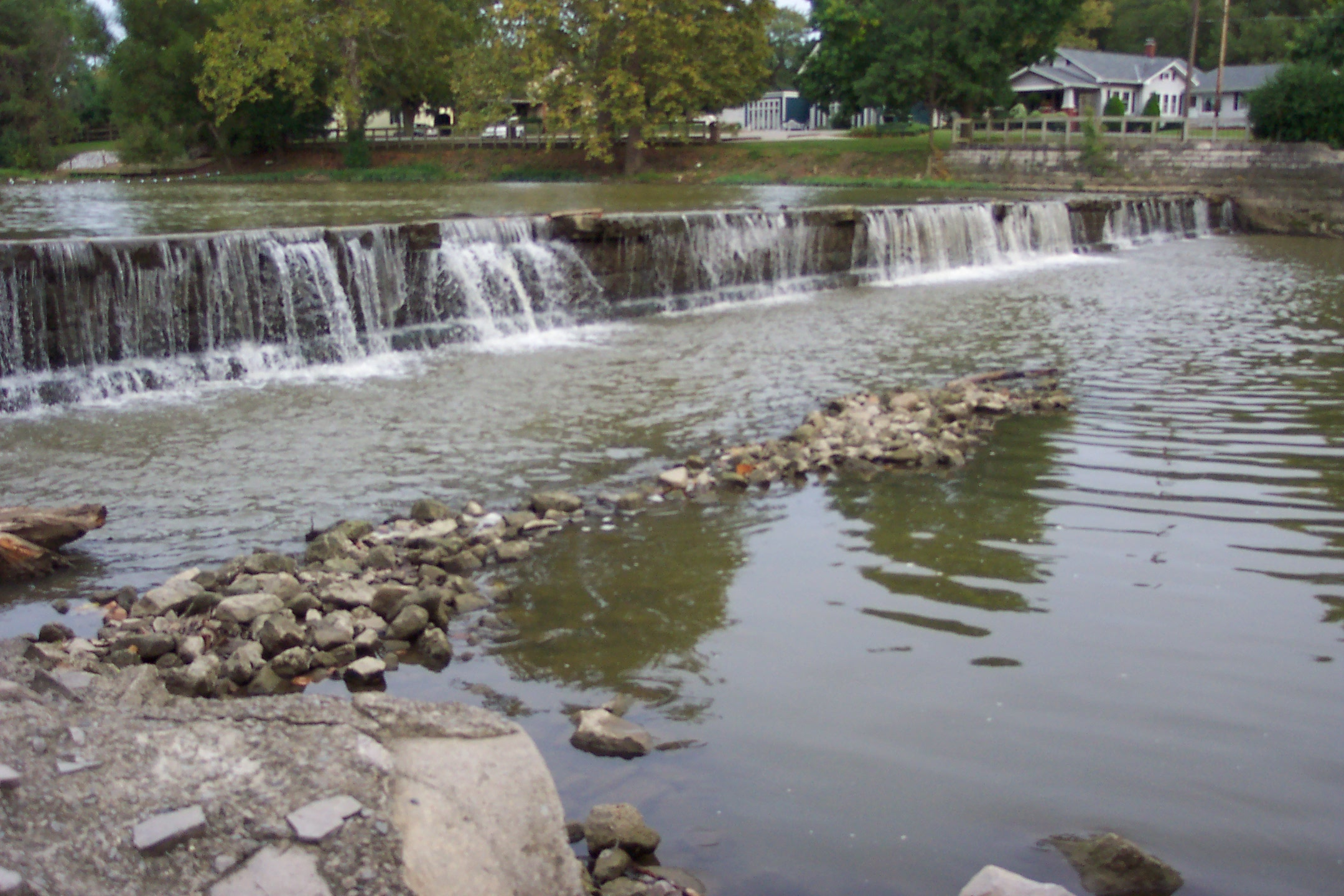
The weir on the Blanchard River in Findlay, Ohio

- In Findlay, Ohio, two teenagers and the two firefighters attempting to rescue them drowned after the overturning of a canoe on the Blanchard River. The city later erected a memorial to them.
- Born:
  - Ida Auken, Danish political scientist ane economist known for the 2016 essay Welcome to 2030: I own nothing, have no privacy, and life has never been better presented at the World Economic Forum, as well as being a priest in the Church of Denmark and as the Danish Minister for the Environment; in Frederiksberg
  - Paul Malakwen Kosgei, Kenyan long-distance and marathon runner, winner of the 2002 world championship in the half marathon; in Marakwet District
  - Hayrulla Karimov, Uzbek international footballer with 15 caps for the Uzbekistan national team; in Namangan, Uzbek SSR, Soviet Union
  - Penny Tai, Malaysian singer, songwriter and producer, winner of Golden Melody Awards; in Segamat, Johor
  - DJ Drama (stage name for Tyree Cinque Simmons), American DJ, record executive and music promoter, 2022 Grammy Award winner for Best Rap Album; in Philadelphia
  - Ezekiel Jackson (ring name for Rycklon Ezekiel Stephens), Guyanese-born American professional wrestler and bodybuilder, 2011 world champion; in Linden
- Died:
  - Basil Dean CBE, 89, English actor, producer and director of West End plays, as well as being a filmmaker
  - Will Geer, 76, American actor known for The Waltons, as well as being a musician and a social activist
  - Varvara Myasnikova, 77, Soviet Russian film actress
  - Jo Heims, 48, American screenwriter known for her collaboration with Clint Eastwood, died of breast cancer.

== April 23, 1978 (Sunday) ==
- The crash of a chartered airplane killed seven officials of the United States Auto Club as they were flying back to Indianapolis, after watching the USAC Gabriel 200 race at the Trenton Speedway in New Jersey.
- Joseph Bruyère of Belgium won the 1978 Liège–Bastogne–Liège cycle race.
- Finland's Markku Alén and co-driver Ilkka Kivimäki won the Rallye de Portugal, a 627 kilometres (390 mi) car race that was part of the 1978 World Rally Championship, after starting on April 19.
- A car bomb planted by rival mobsters killed Rochester, New York, mobster Salvatore "Sammy G" Gingello.
- Died:
  - James Whitney Fosburgh, 67, American painter, art collector and art historian, died of cancer.
  - Christian Lattier, 52, Ivorian sculptor
  - Ivan Pereverzev, 63, Soviet actor
  - Jacques Rueff, 81, French economist and adviser to the Government of France
  - Teo Soon Kim, 73, Singaporean barrister, first woman admitted to the Straits Settlements bar

== April 24, 1978 (Monday) ==
- The Red Brigades, who had taken former Italian prime minister Aldo Moro hostage on March 16, offered to free him in exchange for the release of 13 members of the terrorist group. The statement was the first indication, since the passage of a deadline of 3:00 pm on April 22, that Moro was still alive. The letter was followed later in the day by another letter, apparently written by Moro himself, asking his fellow Christian Democrat party members to save his life, and adding, "We are almost at zero hour, the moment of slaughter." After a meeting of the chief ministers, convened by Prime Minister Giulio Andreotti, the Italian government rejected the demand, declaring that it would "not submit to blackmail" and that the authorities believed that the terrorists had no intention of letting Moro live.
- The U.S. Supreme Court ruled that broadcasters are liable for civil damages when an episode of violence on television leads to a real-life crime. The decision cleared the way for an $11 million lawsuit against NBC for its broadcast on September 17, 1974, of the TV film Born Innocent, depicting a violent sexual assault. Three days after the broadcast, a group of juveniles had made a similar attack on a 9-year-old girl and told police that they had been inspired by the film.
- A judge in New York ruled that David Berkowitz, the accused "Son of Sam" killer, was mentally competent to stand trial for the murder last July 31 of 20-year-old Stacy Moskowitz.
- Born:
  - Stella Damasus, Nigerian film actress known for Two Brides and a Baby; in Benin City
  - Matt Nagy, Arena Football League quarterback and NFL head coach of the Chicago Bears, 2018 to 2021; in Dunellen, New Jersey
  - Beth Storry, English field hockey goalkeeper for the United Kingdom team that won a bronze medal in the 2012 Olympics; in Reading, Berkshire
  - Willy Blain, French amateur professional light welterweight boxer, winner of the 2003 world amateur title; in Le Tampon, Réunion
  - Jesper Christiansen, Danish footballer with 11 caps for the Denmark national team; in Roskilde, Denmark
  - Libor Došek, Czech Olympic and professional footballer with three caps for the Czech Republic Olympic team; in Brno, Czechoslovakia
- Died:
  - Hunk Anderson (Heartley William Anderson), 79, American football player inducted to the College Football Hall of Fame, and college and NFL head coach for Notre Dame (1931–1933) and for the Chicago Bears (1942–1945), whom he coached to the 1943 NFL championship
  - Federico Chávez, 96, President of Paraguay from 1949 to 1954

== April 25, 1978 (Tuesday) ==
- The ordeal of 19-year-old Kevin Strickland, who would spend 43 years in prison in the U.S. for his wrongful conviction on a murder charge, began in Kansas City, Missouri, when a group of three men carried out a home invasion and killed three of the four residents. A fourth victim, Cynthia Douglas, had survived by pretending to be dead, and initially identified Strickland as one of the three assailants. In the years that followed, Douglas would make multiple attempts prior to her death in 2015 to recant her identification of Strickland Strickland would remain incarcerated until November 23, 2021, and freed at the age of 65 with the overturning of the conviction.
- Japan's railways and subways were shut down by a walkout of 330,000 members of the Japan Railway Workers' Union and the National Railway Locomotive Engineers' Union. With highways normally jammed with traffic on normal weekdays, the gridlock got worse as thousands of extra cars were used by commuters, prompting an 18-mile (29 km) traffic jam on roads leading into the Tokyo Metropolitan Area.
- The Treaty of Friendship and Cooperation between Spain and Portugal became effective when Spain's parliament ratified the agreement, which had been signed on November 22, 1977, and ratified by Portugal eight days before Spain acted. The treaty, which came after both nations on the Iberian Peninsula had made the transition to democracy, replaced the 1939 Iberian Pact that had been signed by the dictators of the two nations.
- The 1978 Vuelta a España bicycle stage race began in Gijón, Spain. It would continue through May 14.

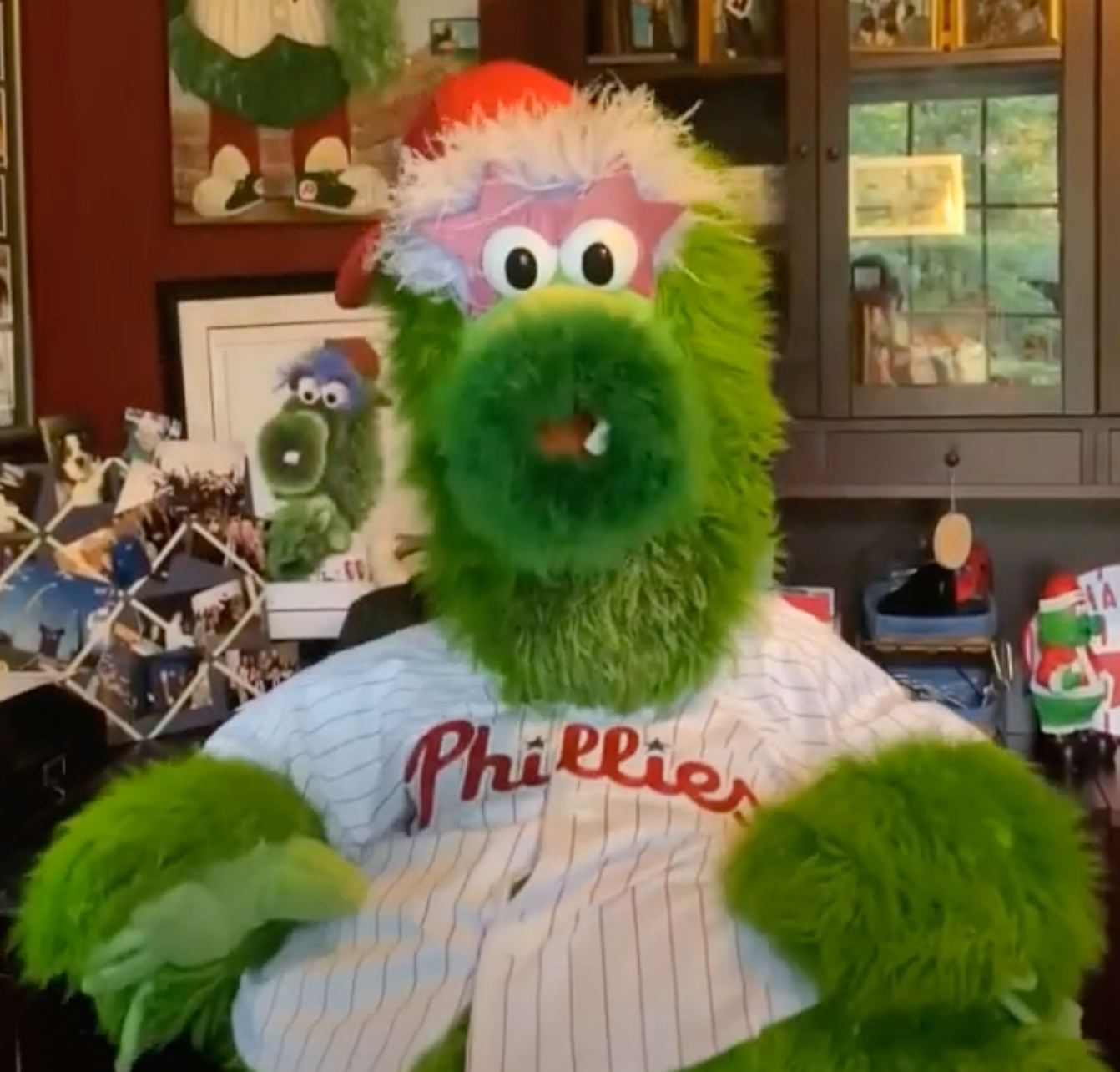
The Phillie Phanatic in 2020

- The Phillie Phanatic, mascot of the Philadelphia Phillies Major League Baseball team, made his on-field debut at Veterans Stadium during a home game against the Chicago Cubs. The creature had made his first public appearance on April 23, on an episode of the local children's TV show Captain Noah and His Magical Ark.
- By a 2-to-1 margin, voters in Saint Paul, Minnesota, elected to repeal a provision in the city's human rights ordinance that protected gays and lesbians from discrimination. Saint Paul was the second U.S. city to repeal its gay rights ordinance, after Anita Bryant's successful 1977 anti-gay campaign in Dade County, Florida.
- Born:
  - Malalai Joya, Afghan women's rights activist, writer and former member of the National Assembly; in Ziken, Farah Province
  - Jean-Michel Lucenay, French épée fencing team member whose 4-member team won the gold medal in the 2016 Summer Olympics and in the world championships in 2009, 2009, 2011, 2014 and 2017; in Fort-de-France, Martinique
  - Duncan Kibet, Kenyan marathon runner with the second fastest time for a marathon ever (2 hours, 4 minutes 27 seconds), winner of the 2009 Rotterdam Marathon
  - Matt Walker, British Paralympic swimmer and winner of gold medals in the 4 × 100 m freestyle in the 2000, 2004 and 2008 Paralympic Games; in Stockport, Greater Manchester
  - Hamchétou Maïga, Mali national women's basketball team member and WNBA player, MVP of the 2007 FIBA Africa Championship for Women; in Bamako
  - Fabian Wagner, German cinematographer, 2020 winner of an American Society of Cinematographers Award; in Munich, West Germany
- Died:
  - General Peng Shaohui, 71, Chinese military officer and Deputy Commander of the People's Liberation Army from 1954 to 1967 and since 1969, member of the Central Committee of the Chinese Communist Party since 1969, known as the "One-Armed General"
  - Leo Najo (Leonardo Alanis), 79, member of the Mexican Professional Baseball Hall of Fame
  - Eero Liives, 86, Estonian composer and violinist
  - Lee Kim Lai, 18, Singapore Police Force member, was abducted from the police unit at Mount Vernon, Singapore, forced into a stolen taxi and murdered for his service revolver. The taxi driver had previously been murdered. The crime became famous within Singapore, both because of the low crime rate in the Asian nation and because the murderers were apprehended the next day.
  - Constable Thomas King, 40, of the Royal Canadian Mounted Police was kidnapped, tortured and then shot to death by two high school students in Saskatoon, Saskatchewan.
  - Arne Rustadstuen, 72, Norwegian Olympic cross-country skier, 1930 World Champion in the 17 km event
  - Harry Griffiths, 47, Welsh footballer and manager, former head manager of Swansea City and then its assistant manager, died of a heart attack.
  - Zenta Mauriņa, 80, Latvian writer, essayist and philologist, 1973 nominee for the Nobel Prize in Literature

== April 26, 1978 (Wednesday) ==
- In Afghanistan, President Mohammad Daoud Khan ordered the arrest of several members of the PDPA in the wake of protests over the April 17 killing of Mir Akbar Khyber. Those arrested included PDPA leader Nur Mohammed Taraki and Babrak Karmal. Hafizullah Amin remained free until 10 hours later, but had used the time to give handwritten orders on carrying out the overthrow of the Daoud regime.
- The first samples were taken for the Cape Grim Air Archive, a project of the Australian Bureau of Meteorology to collect regular air samples from the same location for future study of air pollution trends.
- All seven people aboard a U.S. Navy Lockheed P-3B Orion aircraft were killed when the P-3B crashed at sea about 20 miles (32 km) northeast of Terceira-Lajes AFB, Azores. The bodies of four of the men were eventually recovered.
- The U.S. Supreme Court ruled for the first time that corporations had the same constitutional right to freedom of speech that applied to people. In a 5 to 4 decision in First National Bank of Boston v. Bellotti, the Court struck down a Massachusetts law that prohibited corporate donations to campaigns on ballot initiatives.
- The 1978 Ice Hockey World Championships began in Prague, Czechoslovakia, with eight teams (Canada, Czechoslovakia, Finland, East Germany, West Germany, Sweden, the U.S. and the USSR) participating, with each team to play the other seven in the first round. On the first day, the USSR beat the U.S., 9 to 5, Sweden beat West Germany 6 to 2, and Czechoslovakia defeated East Germany, 8 to 0. The four best teams (the USSR, Czechoslovakia, Canada and Sweden, each playing the other three twice) played the second round through May 14.
- In the first leg of the 1978 UEFA Cup Final, played at Stade Furiani in Corsica, France, SC Bastia (of Corsica) and visiting PSV Eindhoven of the Netherlands played to a goalless draw. The second leg of the two-game series, with winner to be determined by the aggregate of the two scores, was scheduled for May 9. Jacques Tati directed a film, Forza Bastia, documenting the match.
- Born:
  - Stana Katic, Canadian-American actress known for the TV series Castle and Absentia; in Hamilton, Ontario
  - Avant (stage name for Myron Lavell Avant), American contemporary R&B singer and songwriter known for the platinum selling album My Thoughts; in Cleveland
  - Pablo Schreiber, Canadian-born American actor; in Ymir, British Columbia
  - Rachel Morrison, American cinematographer and director, first woman nominated for the Academy Award for Best Cinematography (for Mudbound); in Cambridge, Massachusetts
  - Andrés Mendoza, Peruvian footballer with 44 caps for the Peru national team; in Chincha Alta
  - Anna Mouglalis, French model and film actress, known for Coco Chanel & Igor Stravinsky and for The Most Assassinated Woman in the World; in Nantes, Loire-Atlantique département
- Died:
  - Ottavio Alessi, 59, Italian screenwriter, producer and film director
  - Nino Valeri, 80, Italian historian
  - Elsie Knocker, 93, English nurse and winner of numerous medals for bravery in saving the lives of soldiers in World War I

== April 27, 1978 (Thursday) ==
- In the deadliest construction accident in United States history, 51 construction workers were killed when a cooling tower under construction collapsed at the Pleasants Power Station in Willow Island, West Virginia. Tower number 2 had reached a height of 166 feet (51 m) with the addition of new forms and concrete the day before. Construction workers were on top of scaffolding on the dried concrete. Shortly after 10:00 in the morning, the newest section began to collapse and then unravel in a counter-clockwise direction. All 51 of the workers on the scaffold fell into the hollow center of the tower.
- The Saur Revolution, a Marxist military coup d'état, began in Afghanistan, during which President Mohammad Daoud Khan would be killed and his family murdered. Nur Muhammad Taraki succeeded him, beginning the Afghan conflict which as of 2024 has not yet ended.
- Future Czech Republic President Václav Havel and others founded the Committee for the Defense of the Unjustly Prosecuted (Výbor na obranu nespravedlivě stíhaných or VONS), a Czechoslovak dissident organization.
- Giovanna Amati, 18, a future Formula One driver, was ransomed by her father for 800,000,000 Italian lire (equivalent to US$933,000 at the time) from kidnappers who had threatened to rape her and send her father a recording of the crime. Amati had been kept chained in a wooden box for two and a half months. Her father, a movie theater chain owner, paid part of the ransom with box office receipts from the film Star Wars. His wife sold some of her jewelry and borrowed her servants' life savings.
- In response to a petition filed the previous year by the Health Research Group, an organization affiliated with Ralph Nader, the U.S. Consumer Product Safety Commission (CPSC) voted unanimously to ban benzene. The Health Research Group criticized the CPSC's delay in imposing the ban, saying that it had caused new cases of leukemia.
- Born:
  - Jakub Janda, Czech ski jumper who won the gold medal in the 2005–06 FIS Ski Jumping World Cup; in Čeladná, Czechoslovakia
  - Fredrik Neij, Swedish entrepreneur who founded The Pirate Bay provider of Internet service and the web hosting company PRQ, as well as being a hacker who identified as "TiAMO"; later convicted of copyright infringement and assessed damages and a prison sentence; in Jönköping
  - Talya Lavie, Israeli filmmaker known for the 2014 movie Zero Motivation, the most successful Israeli film of the year; in Petah Tikva
- Died:
  - John Doeg, 69, American tennis player who won the men's singles competition at the U.S. Open in 1930, and the doubles at the U.S. Open in 1929 and 1930
  - Ralston Crawford, 71, American abstract painter, lithographer and photographer
  - Josef Gassler, 85, Austrian expressionist painter
  - Guido Stampacchia, 56, Italian mathematician known for his work on the theory of variational inequalities, the calculus of variation and the theory of elliptic partial differential equations, died of a heart attack.

== April 28, 1978 (Friday) ==
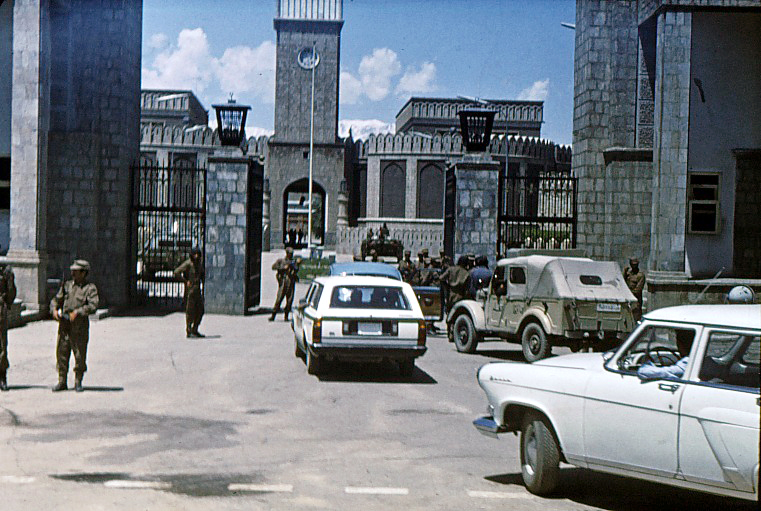
Outside the Arg on the day after the Saur Revolution in Kabul

- In Afghanistan, rebel soldiers surrounded the Arg, the presidential palace in Kabul, and demanded the surrender of the President, Mohammad Daoud Khan, 68, and his brother Naim Khan. According to the rebels, the President and his brother were shot to death after attempting to shoot their assassins.
- The Asian nation of Singapore first implemented its new policy of mandatory execution of convicted narcotics traffickers, as Teh Sin Tong was hanged at Changi Prison for trafficking 254.7 grams (8.98 oz) of diamorphine into the country in April 1976.
- In Rhodesia (now Zimbabwe), black Justice Minister Byron Mtonhodzi Hove (who served jointly with the white Justice Minister, Hilary Squires) was fired from his job by the African nation's multiracial transitional cabinet, after publicly criticizing the exclusion of black Zimbabweans from high-level jobs.
- Born:
  - Germain Katanga, Congolese war criminal who carried out the Bogoro massacre of at least 200 citizens of the Democratic Republic of the Congo in 2003; in Mambasa, Ituri District, Zaire
  - José Adrián Bonilla, Costa Rican professional and Olympic road bicycle racer; in Paraíso, Costa Rica
  - Lauren Laverne, English radio DJ, television presenter, author and singer (Kenickie); in Sunderland, Tyne and Wear, England
  - Robert Oliveri, American former child actor known for Honey, I Shrunk the Kids; in Los Angeles, California
  - Fernando Rapallini, Argentine football referee; in La Plata, Argentina
  - Nate Richert, American actor, director and musician; in Saint Paul, Minnesota
  - Drew Scott, Canadian reality television personality; in Vancouver, British Columbia, Canada
  - Jonathan Scott, Canadian reality television personality, identical twin brother of Drew Scott; in Vancouver, British Columbia, Canada
- Died:
  - Roman Karmen, 71, Soviet war photographer, cinematographer and documentary film director
  - Ghulam Haidar Rasuli, c. 59, Afghan major general, was assassinated.
  - Sir Philip Neame, VC, KBE, CB, DSO, 89, British Army officer and Olympic champion sport shooter; only winner of both an Olympic gold medal and the Victoria Cross
  - Evan Klamer, 55, Danish Olympic cyclist
  - Curt McMahon, 63, American professional basketball player
  - Russell Metty, 71, American cinematographer

== April 29, 1978 (Saturday) ==
- In Poland, the Free Trade Unions of the Coast (Wolne Związki Zawodowe Wybrzeża or WZZ) alliance of shipyard workers, which would eventually lead the 1980 strike at the Lenin Shipyard that gave rise to the Solidarity labor movement, was established in Gdańsk by Andrzej Gwiazda, Krzysztof Wyszkowski and Antoni Sokołowski.
- The Japanese science fiction film Message from Space (Uchū Kara no Messēji) premiered in Japan.
- Ray Reardon defeated Perrie Mans to win the 1978 World Snooker Championship, played at the Crucible Theatre in Sheffield in England. The 1978 World Snooker Championship had begun at the Crucible on April 17. At 45, Reardon became the oldest snooker player ever to win the championship.
- In West Germany's soccer football league, the 1977–78 Bundesliga season ended with 1. FC Köln in first place and Borussia Mönchengladbach in second, based on the tiebreaker rule of goal difference after both FC Köln (22 wins and 4 draws) and Mönchengladbach had finished with 48 points in the standings. Going into the 34th and final games of the season, FC Köln had 21 wins and 4 draws, with 81 goals for them and 41 against them, a difference of +40. Mönchengladbach had 19 wins and 8 draws, with 74 goals for and 44 against for a difference of +30. Mönchengladbach set a record by defeating Borussia Dortmund, 12 to 0 to increase its goal difference to +42 and hoped that FC Köln would either draw or lose its game against FC St. Pauli, or that Köln win its game by only one goal. Instead, Köln defeated St. Pauli, 5 to 0, for one of the narrowest championship wins in Bundesliga history.
- In East Germany's soccer football league, the DDR-Oberliga, the 1977–78 FDGB-Pokal tournament was won by 1. FC Magdeburg, 1 to 0, over Dynamo Dresden.
- In Northern Ireland's soccer league, the Irish Football Association, Linfield defeated Ballymena United, 3 to 1, to win the 1977–78 Irish Cup.
- The Miss USA pageant took place at the Gillard Municipal Auditorium in Charleston, South Carolina, and was won by Miss Hawaii USA, Judi Andersen. Miss Anderson would go on to be first runner-up at Miss Universe on July 24.
- Born:
  - Bob Bryan and Mike Bryan, the most successful doubles team in tennis of all time, who won 16 Grand Slam men's doubles titles between 2003 and 2014, with six in the Australian Open (2006, 2007, 2009, 2010, 2011, 2013); five in the U.S. Open (2005, 2008, 2010, 2012, 2014); three at Wimbledon (2006, 2011, 2013) and two at the French Open (2003, 2013); in Camarillo, California
  - Tyler Labine, Canadian film and television actor best known for the Hulu TV series Deadbeat; in Brampton, Ontario, Canada
  - Craig Gower, Australian rugby league (18 caps for Australia) and rugby union (14 caps for Italy) player; in Penrith, New South Wales
  - Neil Doyle, Irish international football referee for the FIFA World Cup qualifiers; in Dundrum, Dublin
  - Sam Jones, American professional basketball player and coach known for guiding SPM Shoeters Den Bosch to three Dutch League championships; in Chicago
  - Facundo Gómez Brueda, Mexican television host; in Mexico City
  - Javier Colon, American singer-songwriter known for winning the first season of the TV series The Voice; in Stratford, Connecticut
  - Masoud Haji Akhondzadeh, Iranian Olympic judoka; in Mashhad, Iran
- Died:
  - Abdul Qadir Nuristani, 41, Interior Minister of Afghanistan, was assassinated.
  - Theo Helfrich, 64, German racing driver
  - Giacomo Vaghi, 76, Italian operatic bass
  - Yukihiko Yasuda, 94, Japanese painter

== April 30, 1978 (Sunday) ==
Democratic Republic of Afghanistan

- The Marxist "Democratic Republic of Afghanistan" was proclaimed, under pro-communist leader Nur Muhammad Taraki, two days after the Saur Revolution had overthrown and killed President Mohammad Daoud Khan.
- Multiparty elections were held in the West African nation of Upper Volta (now Burkina Faso) with 367 candidates vying for the 57 seats of the Assemblée nationale de Haute Volta. The UDV-RDA Party lost its 37-seat majority, dropping nine seats to a 28-seat plurality while three new parties won 23 seats and the Parti du Regroupement Africain won six seats. Voter turnout was just 38.3%.
- The Ba Chúc massacre of Vietnamese civilians by an invasion of Cambodia's Khmer Rouge guerrillas came to an end after 12 days and the deaths of an estimated 3,157 people.
- In Ireland's 1977–78 National Hurling League, Clare GAA won the championship playoff, defeating Kilkenny GAA, 3–10 to 1-10 (equivalent to 19 to 13, based on three-point goals and one point for each shot above the crossbar).
- Born:
  - Sandra Hüller, German actress, winner of the Silver Bear for Best Actress for Requiem; in Suhl, East Germany
  - Simone Barone, Italian footballer and manager; in Nocera Inferiore, Italy
  - Joachim Boldsen, Danish Olympic team handball player; in Helsingør, Denmark
  - Alice Canepa, Italian tennis player; in Finale Ligure, Italy
  - Emily McInerny, Australian basketball player; in Bendigo, Victoria, Australia
- Died: Liane Augustin, 50, German Austrian singer and actress
