= Astron =

Astron may refer to:

- Astron Energy, a major South African petroleum company
- Mitsubishi Astron engine
- ASTRON, the Dutch foundation for astronomy research, operating the Westerbork Synthesis Radio Telescope and LOFAR
- Astron (comics), a fictional character, a member of the Marvel Comics group The Eternals
- Astron (spacecraft), Soviet ultraviolet space telescope
- Astron (fusion reactor), a fusion power design from the 1960s
- Astron (wristwatch), the world's first quartz wristwatch by Seiko
- The fourth month in the Shire Calendar
- Van Hool T917 Astron, a coach body
- Astron (ship), a Russian cargo vessel wrecked off the coast of the Dominican Republic
