= 1977–78 Irish Cup =

Tournament details
- Country: Northern Ireland
- Teams: 16

Final positions
- Champions: Linfield (31st win)
- Runners-up: Ballymena United

Tournament statistics
- Matches played: 18
- Goals scored: 71 (3.94 per match)

The 1977–78 Irish Cup was the 98th edition of the Irish Cup, Northern Ireland's premier football knock-out cup competition. It began on 4 February 1978, and concluded on 29 April 1978 with the final.

The defending champions were Coleraine, after they defeated Linfield 4–1 in the 1976–77 final. However, Linfield gained revenge by knocking the holders out with a 2–1 win in the first round. Linfield went on to win the cup for the 31st time, defeating Ballymena United 3–1 in the final.

== Results ==
=== First round ===
Team 1	Score	Team 2
Ards	5–2	Dungannon Swifts
Ballymena United	6–2	Downpatrick Rec.
Cliftonville	1–3	Bangor
Dundela	1–2^{1}	Crusaders
Glenavon	1–3	Larne
Glentoran	5–1	RUC
Linfield	2–1	Coleraine
Portadown	5–3	Distillery

^{1}This tie required a replay, after the first game was a 2–2 draw.

=== Quarter-finals ===
Team 1	Score	Team 2
Ballymena United	1–0	Ards
Bangor	0–6	Portadown
Crusaders	1–0	Larne
Linfield	4–3	Glentoran

=== Semi-finals ===
Team 1	Score	Team 2
Ballymena United	1–1 (4–1 p)^{2}	Crusaders
Linfield	2–1	Portadown

^{2}This tie was eventually decided by a penalty shoot-out in the second replay, after all three games ended as 1–1 draws.

=== Final ===
29 April 1978

Linfield	3 – 1	Ballymena United
Dornan 14'; Garrett 39'; Rafferty 83'	Report	Nelson 67'

The Oval, Belfast
