= Ernst Bantle =

German footballer

Personal information
- Date of birth: 16 February 1901
- Date of death: 13 April 1978 (aged 77)
- Position: Striker

Senior career*
Years	Team	Apps	(Gls)
1920–1925	Freiburger FC		

International career
1924	Germany	1	(0)
- * Club domestic league appearances and goals

Ernst Bantle (16 February 1901 – 13 April 1978) was a German international footballer.
