= Josef Gassler =

Austrian painter (1893–1978)

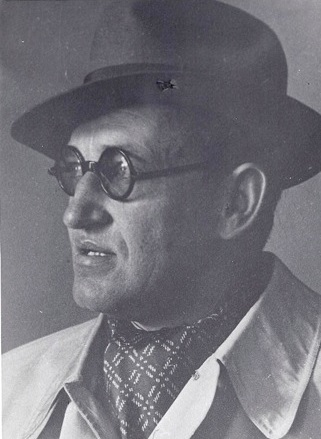
- Born: 6 March 1893; Austerlitz, Moravia
- Died: 27 April 1978 (aged 85); Vienna, Austria
- Known for: Academic Painter

Josef Gassler was an Austrian Expressionist painter. He was born in Austerlitz, Moravia, on 6 March 1893 and died in Vienna on 27 April 1978.

After early success at the Wiener Kunstakademie, where he received several awards including the Prix de Rome, the artist was later impeded in mid-career by the outbreak of war. Initially, enduring extreme poverty and oppressed by the First World War, he inclined towards melancholy subjects and an emotionally charged style with touches of the movement called Neue Sachlichkeit.

Josef Gassler lived in Paris from 1927 to 1930, travelled in Italy and the South of France and to Prague, Karlovy Vary and Vienna. After settling in the Czech Republic, he spent winters in cosmopolitan Prague where gained recognition. He occasionally designed porcelain and glass for Moser and other Czechoslovak manufacturers and worked on murals and theatrical scenery.

Gassler's career falters with the coming of Fascism, when Germany introduced the concept of degenerate arts. The German invasion of Czechoslovakia was followed by World War II, in turn followed by Communist occupation.

In 1945 Gassler returned to Vienna, where he continued to work, mainly painting portraits, landscapes and flower studies.

Josef Gassler exhibited in the Salon des Indépendants, the Wiener Sezession, the Kuenstlerhaus, the Rudolfinum and in private galleries. On his 70th birthday he received the Golden Laurel award from the Wiener Kuenstlerhaus. His work is found at the Oesterreichische Galerie as well as in private collections in Austria, Germany, England and the United States.
