= Eduardo Héctor Garat =

Argentine lawyer (1945–1978)

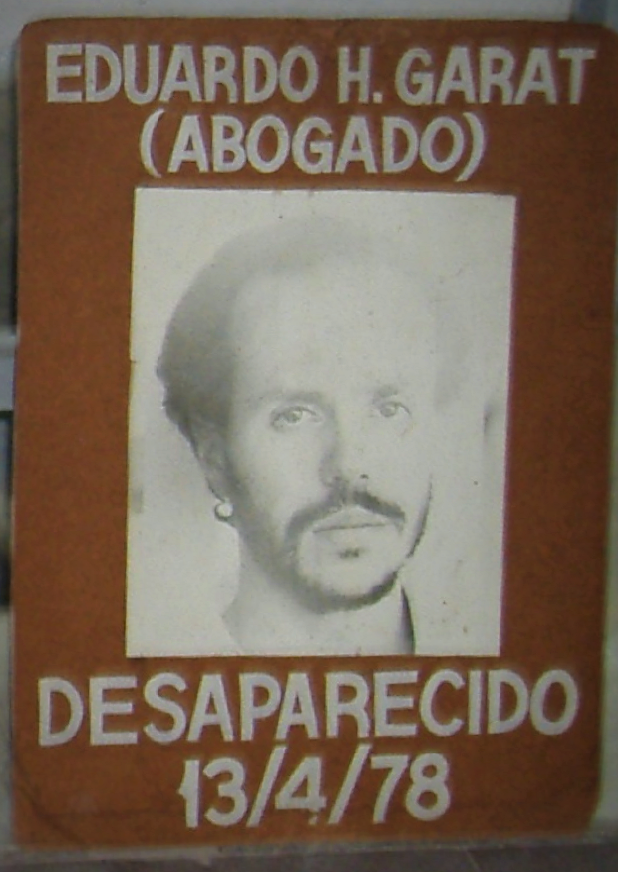
- Born: Eduardo Héctor Garat Cabanillas; 27 November 1945; Rosario, Santa Fe, Argentina
- Died: April 1978 (aged 32); Rosario, Santa Fe, Argentina
- Occupation(s): Lawyer, activist

Eduardo Héctor Garat Cabanillas (Note: In this Spanish name, the first or paternal surname is Garat and the second or maternal family name is Cabanillas.) (Rosario, Santa Fe, 27 November 1945 – Rosario, Santa Fe, April 1978) was an Argentine lawyer and notary and a Montoneros militant.

On 13 April 1978, he was kidnapped and disappeared by the National Reorganization Process, the last Argentine civil–military dictatorship (1976-1983).

== Life ==
Garat studied law at the National University of Rosario. In 1967 and 1968, he joined the national leadership of Franja Morada before it became the university arm of the Radical Civic Union in Argentina. He participated in the so-called Rosariazo in 1969 and in 1970 traveled to Chile to celebrate the triumph of Salvador Allende's socialism. He received his law degree as a lawyer and a notary.

He was a professor of Journalism and Political Science at the National University of Rosario and defended political prisoners. He was also a member of Juventud Peronista, Partido Reformista, Partido Auténtico and Montoneros. He married Elsa María Lilia Martín, with whom he had three children.

On 18 November 1974 he was arrested for pasting posters on the street with Ricardo Massa, who also remains missing, and was imprisoned for six or seven months.

A report by the Intelligence Directorate of the Buenos Aires Police (DIPBA) from 1967 mentions Garat. He participated in the Commission investigating the disappearance of Tacuarita Brandazza (1949–1972), whom he did not know but whose death would foreshadow his own.

== Kidnapping and disappearance ==
Seal of the Montoneros group.

Garat was kidnapped in the early hours of April 13, 1978 on a downtown corner of Rosario, Santa Fe.

=== Investigation ===
It was learned that Garat was kidnapped by a task force of the 121st Battalion and taken to the clandestine detention center located in the Salesian Seminary Ceferino Namuncurá, in Funes, Santa Fe, where Garat, Santiago Mac Guire (a former priest) and Roberto Pistacchia were tortured. According to some versions, the Archbishop of Rosario, Guillermo Bolatti, toured the clandestine centers with the torturers. Mac Guire and Pistacchia confirmed that Garat was tortured until he died, reportedly in late April 1978.

When Mac Guire's kidnapping was turned into detention, his wife, Maria Magdalena Carey, was able to visit him and contacted Garat's wife. He told her that they had been in a clandestine center in Funes and that after torturing the former priest they demanded that he sign a kind of confession, "or we make you a ballot like Garat who did not want to sign".

=== The cause "Guerrieri" ===
Garat's family presented itself as a plaintiff in the mega-case known as "Guerrieri," which investigates crimes committed by the Army in Santa Fe Province. Despite the efforts made by his wife and mother, which included habeas corpus and various interviews with military, ecclesiastical and political personnel, his whereabouts were never discovered. Garat remained missing. Pistacchia confirmed Garat's death to his brother, Carlos Garat, in 2009. As of 2017, Garat's final resting place was still unknown.

=== Mother of the Plaza ===
Garat's mother, Hayde Garat, was a member of the Mothers of the Plaza 25 de Mayo, as mentioned in Marianela Scocco's book El viento sigue soplando. Los orígenes de Madres de Plaza de Mayo de Rosario (1977-1985) ("The wind keeps blowing: The origins of Mothers of Plaza de Mayo de Rosario (1977-1985)").

== Posthumous book ==
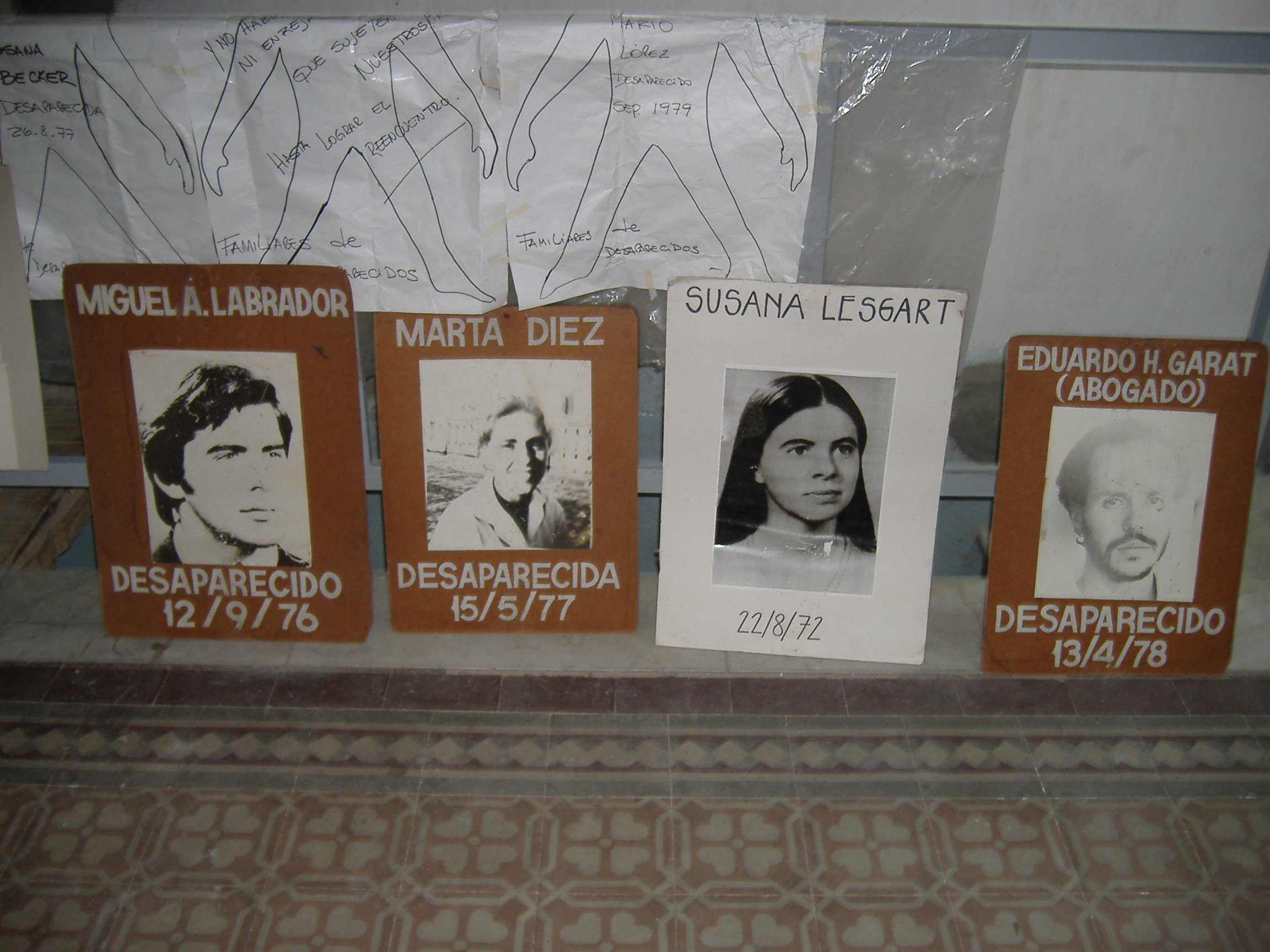
Display with photographs of desaparecidos from Rosario. Eduardo Garat's photograph is on the right.

Texto constitucional, proyecto hegemónico y realidad histórica ("Constitutional text, hegemonic project and historical reality") is a posthumous work by Eduardo Garat. Written in 1972, it describes the repression that would occur in 1976. A typed draft of his work was rescued, which was subsequently published. The book is an essay on the Peronist Constitution of 1949 and was presented in November 2012 in Buenos Aires by a panel consisting of former Foreign Minister Jorge Taiana; the then Secretary of Human Rights, Martín Fresneda; the historian Roberto Baschetti; the editor of the text, Esteban Langhi; and Florencia Garat, daughter of the author and member of HIJOS Rosario. The book was previously presented at the Faculty of Law of the National University of Rosario in August 2012.

== Tributes ==
On the initiative of the Deliberative Council of Rosario, in 2009 a memorial plaque was placed in the Plaza del Foro in Rosario with the names of lawyers and employees of the Foro Local who were killed or disappeared during the rule of the National Reorganization Process. The plaque includes the name of Eduardo Héctor Garat as well as those of Juan Máximo Ferrarons, Felipe Rodríguez Araya, César Manuel Tabares, Alberto Coraza, the prosecutor Luis Eduardo Lescano and the judicial employee Roberto Borda.
