= Astron (ship) =

Russian vessel wrecked off Dominican Republic

Coordinates: 18°43′49.79″N 68°27′14.27″W

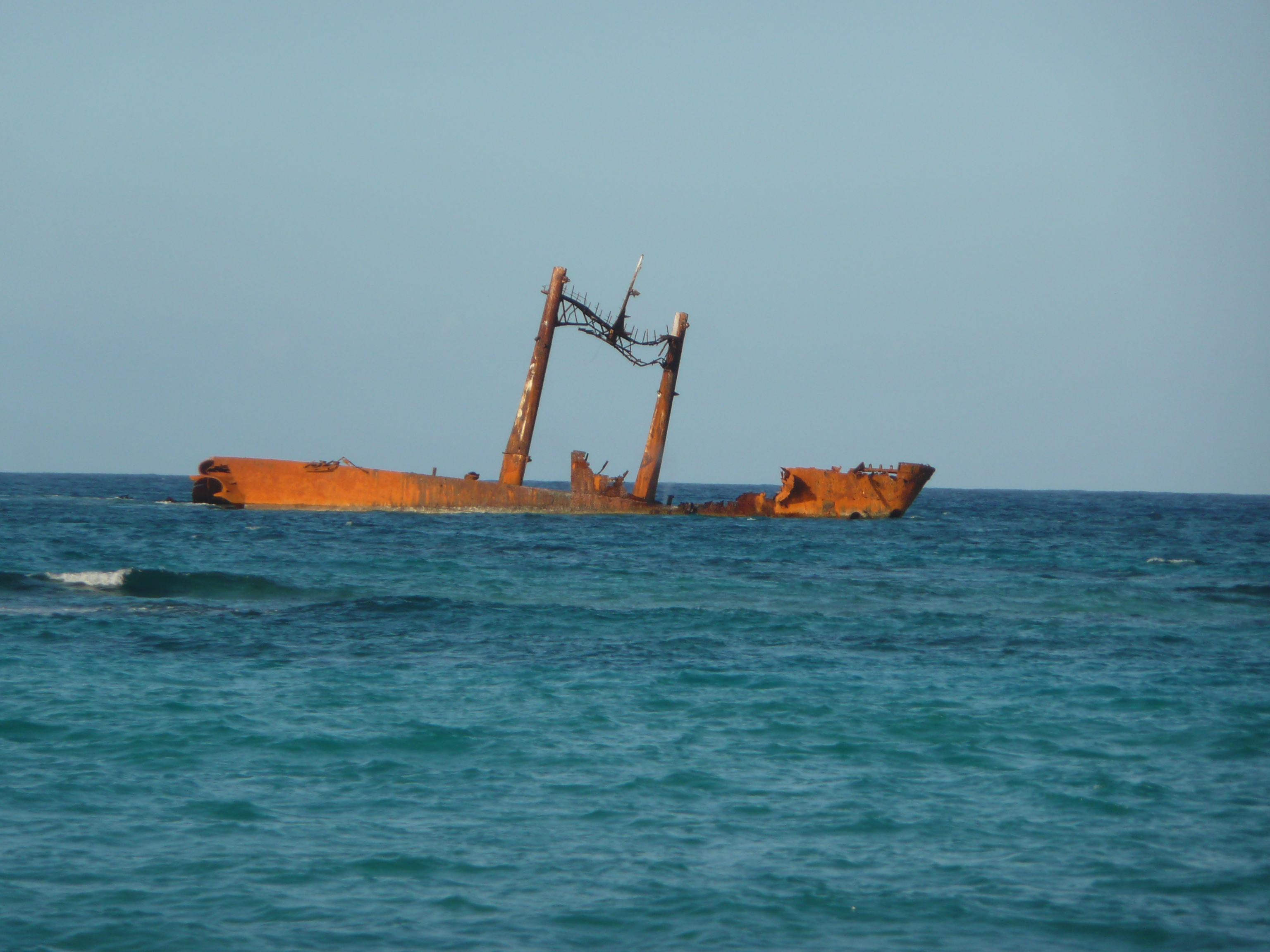
- The Astron shipwreck in 2008

History
- Name: Esmeralda
- Operator: Compagnie Auxiliaire De Navigation
- Builder: Chantiers de l'Atlantique, Saint-Nazaire, France
- Yard number: L17
- Launched: 1957
- Out of service: 1972
- Fate: Acquired by Pontiac Shipping Co. Ltd 1972

History
- Name: Bonnie
- In service: 1972
- Out of service: 1976
- Fate: renamed Astron

History
- Name: Astron
- Owner: Pontiac Shipping Co. Ltd
- Port of registry: Panama
- In service: 1976
- Identification: IMO number: 5106380
- Fate: Run aground in off Punta Cana, 7 April 1978

General characteristics
- Type: Oil tanker
- Tonnage: 26,947 GRT; 27,990 GT; 47,012 DWT
- Length: 127 m
- Propulsion: Steam Turbine
- Speed: 16.5 knots (30.6 km/h; 19.0 mph)

Astron (previously named Esmeralda and Bonnie) is a shipwreck located off the coast of Punta Cana in the Dominican Republic. She was a Russian-owned cargo ship built in France by Chantiers de l'Atlantique during 1957. She was 127 metres (417 feet) long, 27,990 gross tons, and was a motor ship.

Astron was delivering 60 tons of corn to Cuba on 7 April 1978, when she ran aground at Punta Cana. According to Christopher Paul Baker writing in National Geographic Traveler, the Astron ran aground in a storm, although there is no hurricane or tropical storm listed during this date in the history of the Atlantic Hurricane season of 1978. Various other speculations about cause of the sinking have circulated.

The ship is broken into two distinct sections with the bow above the water and the stern underwater. 7,330 barrels of bunker fuel were reported lost in the incident. The wreck is in water 16 metres (52 feet) deep, meaning it can be visited by scuba divers.

As of April 2025, only a small portion remains above water.

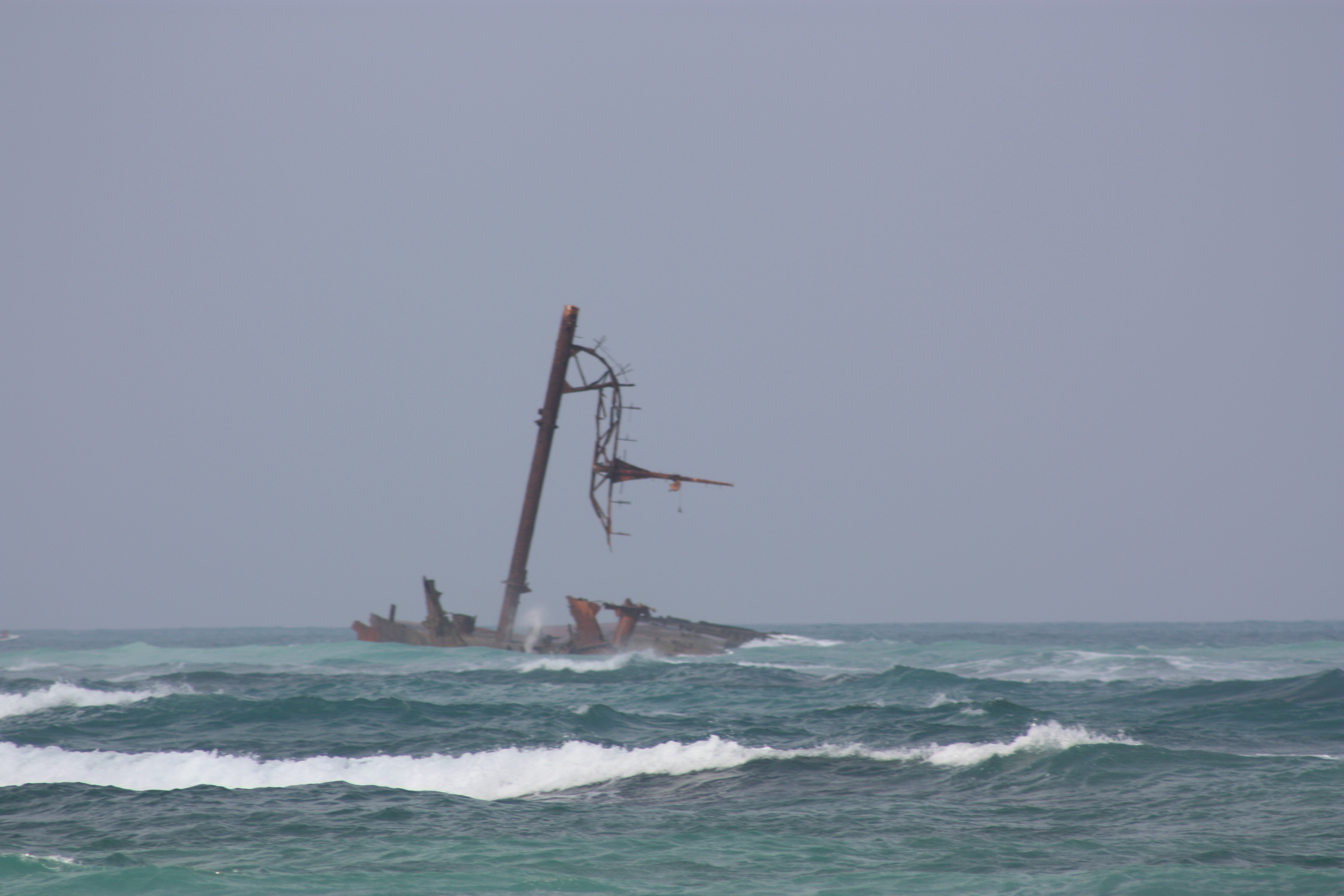
The Astron shipwreck in 2010
