= Duffey Peak =

Mountain in British Columbia, Canada

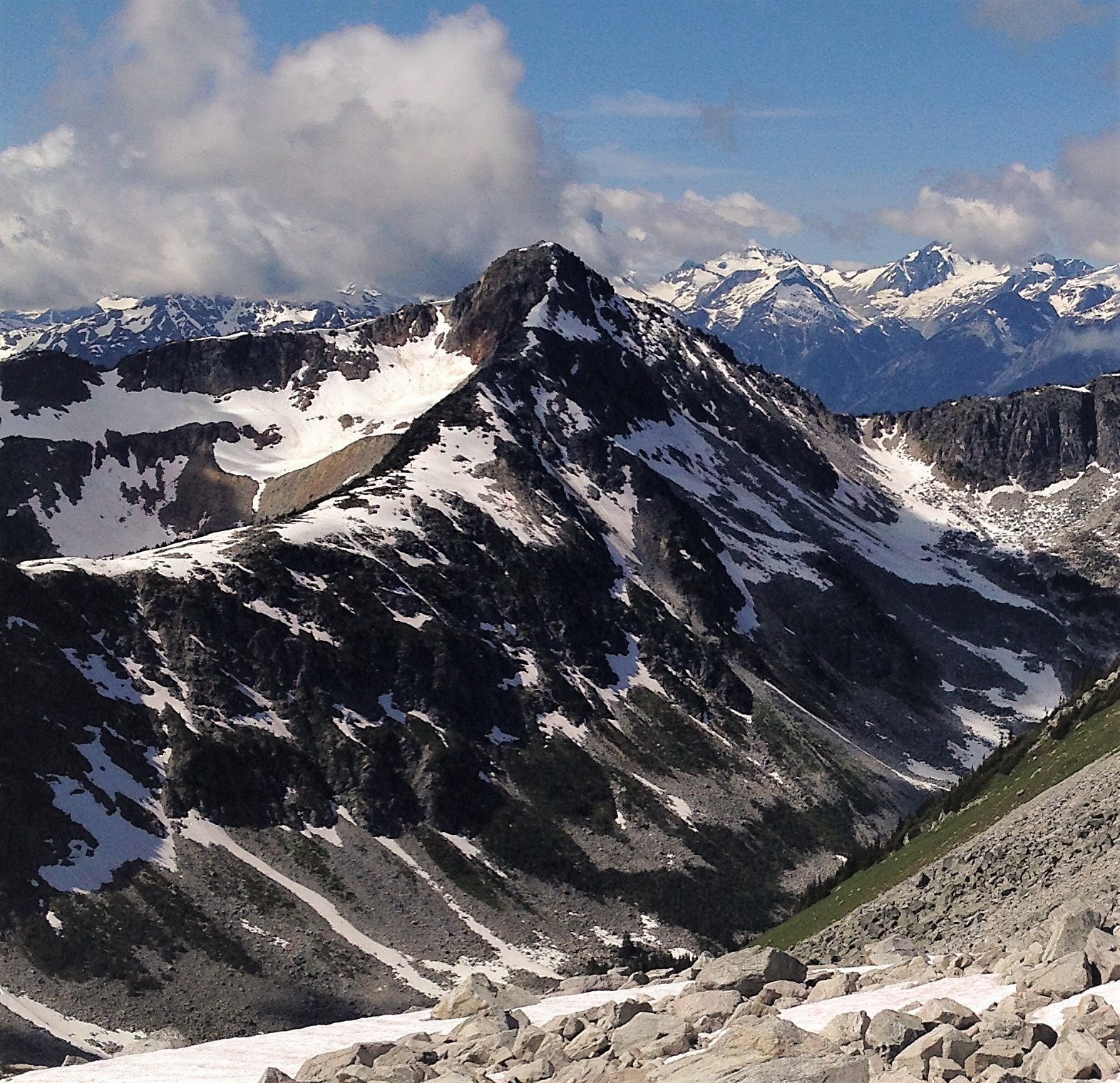
- Northeast aspect

Highest point
- Elevation: 2,219 m (7,280 ft)
- Prominence: 289 m (948 ft)
- Parent peak: Slalok Mountain (2,653 m)
- Isolation: 3.99 km (2.48 mi)
- Listing: Mountains of British Columbia
- Coordinates: 50°18′04″N 122°30′39″W

Geography
- Location within British Columbia Location within Canada
- Interactive map of Duffey Peak
- Country: Canada
- Province: British Columbia
- District: Lillooet Land District
- Parent range: Joffre Group; Lillooet Ranges; Coast Ranges
- Topo map: NTS 92J7 Pemberton

Climbing
- Easiest route: Scrambling

Duffey Peak is a 2,219-metre (7,280-foot) mountain summit located in southwest British Columbia, Canada.

== Description ==
Duffey Peak is part of the Joffre Group, which is a subset of the Lillooet Ranges of the Coast Mountains. It is situated 20 km (12 mi) east of Pemberton, and 4 km (2 mi) immediately northeast of Lillooet Lake. The nearest higher neighbor is Slalok Mountain, 4 km (2 mi) to the northeast and the two peaks are connected by Two Goat Ridge. Precipitation runoff from the peak drains into Joffre Creek and Twin One Creek, both of which are tributaries of the Lillooet River. Topographic relief is significant as the summit rises over 2,000 meters (6,560 feet) above Lillooet Lake in four kilometers (2.5 miles). The summit offers a panoramic view of the lake as well as Mount Matier, Mount Hartzell, Mount Spetch, Slalok Mountain, and Mount Taylor.

== Etymology ==
The mountain is named in association with Duffey triangulation station. The toponym was officially adopted on January 23, 1979, by the Geographical Names Board of Canada. The Duffey name, as associated with nearby Duffey Lake, refers to "Patrick Duffey, miner, Lillooet" according to the Geographic Board.

== Climate ==
Based on the Köppen climate classification, Duffey Peak is located in a subarctic climate zone of western North America. Most weather fronts originate in the Pacific Ocean, and travel east toward the Coast Mountains where they are forced upward by the range (Orographic lift), causing them to drop their moisture in the form of rain or snowfall. As a result, the Coast Mountains experience high precipitation, especially during the winter months in the form of snowfall. Temperatures can drop below −20 °C with wind chill factors below −30 °C. The months July through September offer the most favorable weather for climbing Duffey Peak.

== Gallery ==
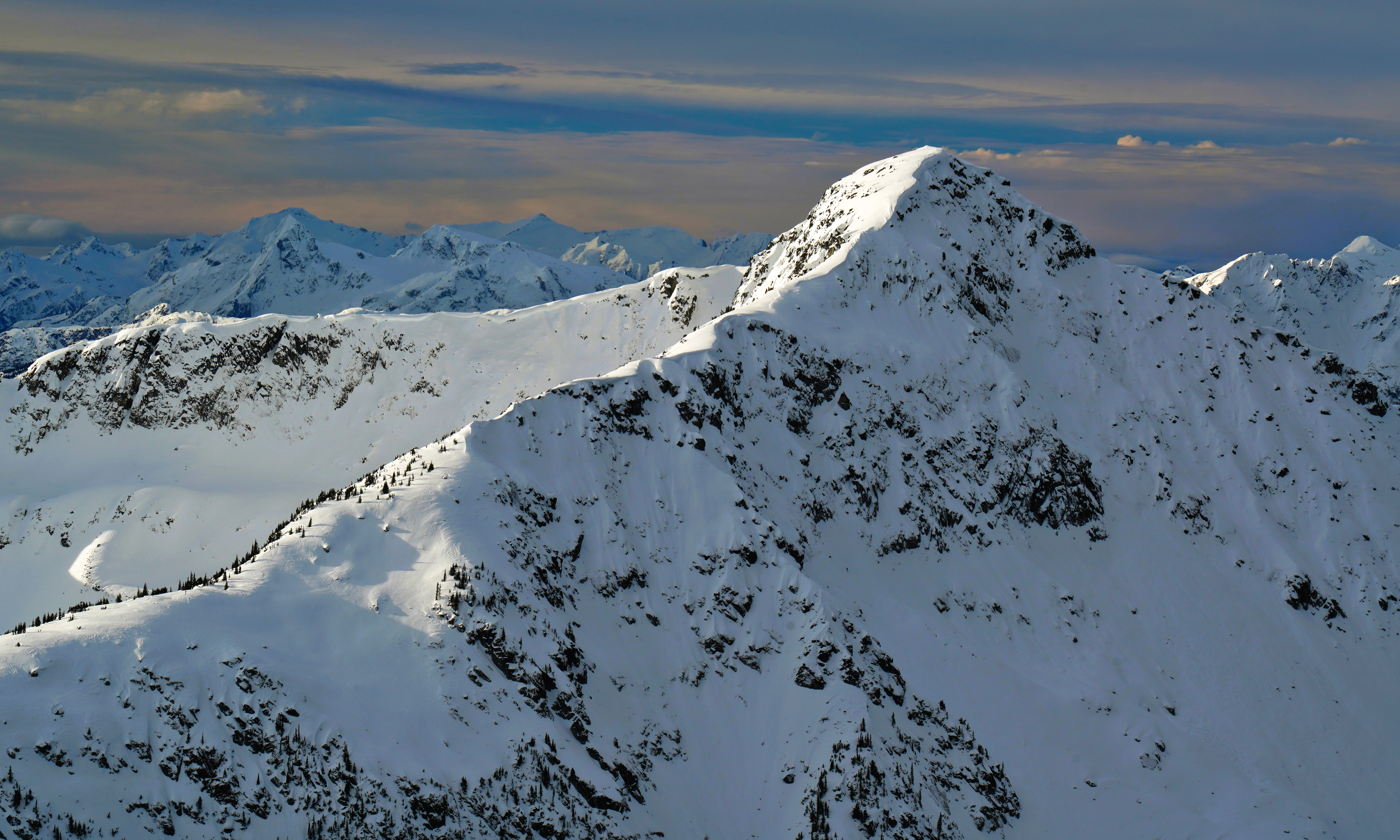
North aspect, viewed from Mt. Taylor in winter

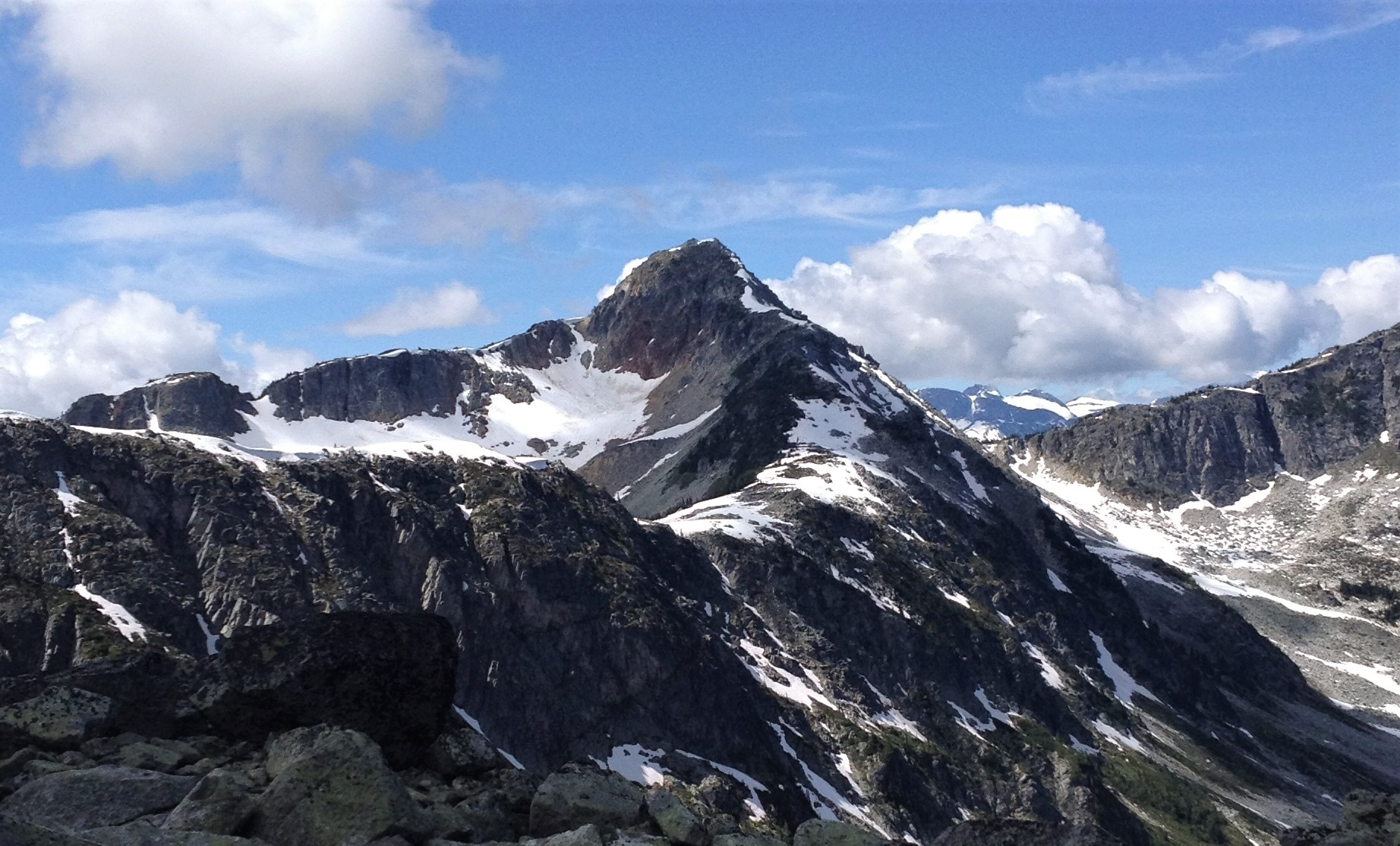
Duffey Peak

== See also ==
- Geography of British Columbia
- Geology of British Columbia
