= Nlháxten/Cerise Creek Conservancy =

Conservancy in British Columbia, Canada

- IUCN category II (national park)
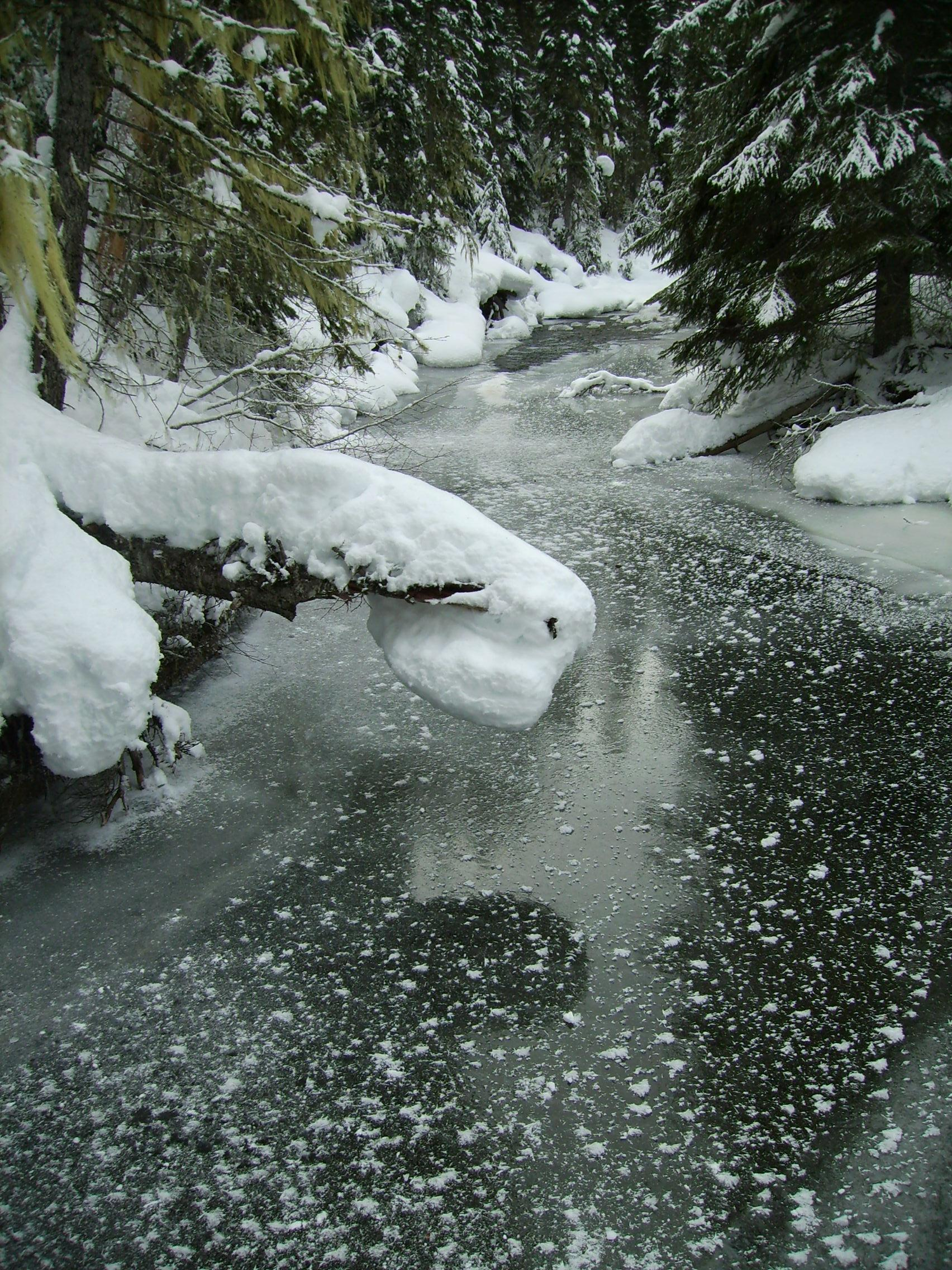
- Ice on Cerise Creek

- Location within British Columbia
- Location: Squamish-Lillooet Regional District, British Columbia
- Nearest city: Pemberton
- Coordinates: 50°22′16″N 122°27′35″W
- Area: 2,272 ha (8.77 sq mi)
- Designation: Conservancy
- Established: 27 June 2008
- Governing body: BC Parks

The Nlháxten/Cerise Creek Conservancy is a 2,272-hectare conservancy north of Pemberton, British Columbia, established in 2008. Located within the mountainous Joffre Group between the Pacific Cayoosh ranges, it encompasses diverse terrain, including mountain tarns in the Anniversary Glacier area, subalpine meadows, Engelmann spruce forest ecosystems, and portions of the Cerise Creek watershed. Mount Chief Pascal (2,204 meters) stands at the center of the conservancy, with other striking peaks like Joffre Peak and Mount Matier forming its boundary. It abuts the popular Joffre Lakes Provincial Park. The area is popular for backcountry skiing and other outdoor recreation, and is the site of a mountain hut that predates the conservancy's establishment.

The conservancy is located on the territory of three First Nations: N’Quatqua First Nation, Sekw’el’was (Cayoose Creek) First Nation, and T’it’q’et First Nation.

== Geography ==
The conservancy is just north of Mount Matier and the Anniversary Glacier as well as the smaller peak of Mount Chief Pascale. It is situated about 23 kilometers south of D'Arcy (reachable by a 70-kilometer road journey), 30 kilometers northeast of Mount Currie and Pemberton, 70 kilometers northeast of Whistler, and 65 kilometers southwest of Lillooet.

== History ==
Nlháxten/Cerise Creek Conservancy plays a crucial role as forming a place for First Nations food gathering, and cultural, spiritual and ceremonial practices. It also creates a transportation route between Lillooet and Duffey lake, Duffey Lake to Twin One Creek, and Blowdown Creek to the Stein Valley. The area provides sufficient berries and edible plants which form the name "banquet places" by the Lil'wat. Upon these cultural lands remains the art carved into the trees and rocks by the Indigenous people that lived there.

== Goals of the protected area ==
In 2006, the Lit'wat Nation created a Land Use Plan (LLUP) to guide their use of their Traditional Territory, with a focus on preserving cultural values and natural resources in areas known as Nt'ákmen Areas, which means "Our Way" in their language. The LLUP aims to protect these areas for traditional activities like gathering, fishing, hunting, trapping, and ceremonies. In 2008, negotiations between the Lit'wat Nation and the Province of British Columbia led to the signing of the Land Use Planning Agreement (LUPA) as part of the Sea to Sky Land and Resource Management Plan (LRMP) process. Recognizing the significant process of Nt'ákmen Areas, the Provinces designated conservancies and cultural management areas to preserve their cultural and ecological values. Nlháxten/Cerise Creek Conservancy was established in 2008 under the Protected Areas of British Columbia Act, with its management directed by the Park Act. The LUPA outlines specific management objectives for conservancies, which include safeguarding the biological diversity and natural environments within the zone, such as wildlife habitats, sustaining current levels of low-intensity backcountry recreational and tourism use while also increasing opportunities for Lil'wat Nation participation in commercial recreation and tourism enterprises, and promoting sustainable recreational and economic activities.

== Protected area ==
The area contains five provincial parks and three conservancies within 20-kilometres radius of the conservancy.

=== Joffre Lakes Park ===
The western boundary of the conservancy is adjacent to Joffre Lakes Park, which was established to protected area situated between the Coast Mountains and Interior Plateau, offering alpine recreation opportunities. Joffre Lakes Park primarily functions as a Nature Recreation Zone and is a popular destination for summer hikes and mountaineers.

=== Duffey Lake Park ===
Duffey Lake Park is located 3km northeast of the conservancy along Highway 99, which is an important area for food gathering and cultural use by First Nations. Established in 1993 and expanded in 2008, the park extended from Duffey Lake to the surrounding alpine ridges. It offers popular activities, such as canoeing, kayaking, and wildlife viewing. Duffey Lake Park is connected to a Cultural Management Area outlined in the Land Use Planning Agreement (LUPA) between the Lil'wat Nation and the Province, further enhancing the protection of cultural and ecological values in the region.

== Management ==
In 2017, Lil’wat Nation and BC Parks initiated the planning process for the Nlháxten/Cerise Creek Conservancy, with the Lil'wat Nation providing funding. While the Lil'wat Nation played a crucial role, neighbouring First Nations and key stakeholders also actively participated and contributed input to the plan's development.

=== First Nations ===
The Province and the First Nations develop a relationship based on mutual respect, recognition, and accommodation of Aboriginal title and rights. To ensure that conservancy management aligns with the Lil'wat, N'Quatqua, Sekw’el’was, and T’it’q’et First Nations cultural values, interests, and uses in the area, the management plans function as fostering strong working relationship.

=== Community ===
The Nlháxten/Cerise Creek Conservancy is of interest to residents from nearby communities like Mount Currie, Pemberton, Whistler, and Lillooet, as well as outdoor enthusiasts from Metro Vancouver, as it serves as a hub for recreational activities and tourism. They maintain dialogue with local First Nations, provincial and local government officials, residents, and local mountaineering clubs/groups who have expressed interest in the conservancy's use and management. The goal is to raise awareness and garner support from these various stakeholders for the conservancy's well-being.

== Ecology ==
=== Fauna ===
Notable large species inhabiting Nlháxten/Cerise Creek Conservancy include the grizzly bear, black bear, bobcat, cougar, wolverine, black-tailed deer, mountain goat, and moose. The area falls within the Stein-Nahatlatch Grizzly Bear Population Unit, a threatened population with 24 Grizzly Bears remaining, and is used to forage by this population. The watersheds inhabit the Coastal Tailed Frog, which is blue-listed (species of special concern) by the province.

=== Flora ===
Nlháxten/Cerise Creek Conservancy has few trees, mostly inhabited by shrubs, grasses, flowering plants, mosses, and lichen. Whitebark pine is found in the conservancy, which is listed as endangered by the IUCN. The upper forested area of the Nlháxten/Cerise Creek Conservancy contains old-growth forests, which are protected under the Parks Act.

== Visitors ==
Nlháxten/Cerise Creek Conservancy has been an accessible mountaineering location since the paving of Lilooet Road. Visitor use is highest in the winter months of January and February, with 50% of visitation on Saturdays and Sundays. Backcountry skiing and snowshoeing are popular recreational activities at the conservancy.

Located at 1,650 metres elevation, Keith Flavelle Memorial Hut (Keith's Hut) supports climbing and ski touring. The number of visitors to the hut has risen since it was built in 1988, to approximately 3,572 in 2017. Dispersed camping is also available at the hut or at the toe of Anniversary Glacier. To protect the species and natural environment, campfires are prohibited in all areas of the conservancy.
