= Slalok Mountain =

Mountain in British Columbia, Canada

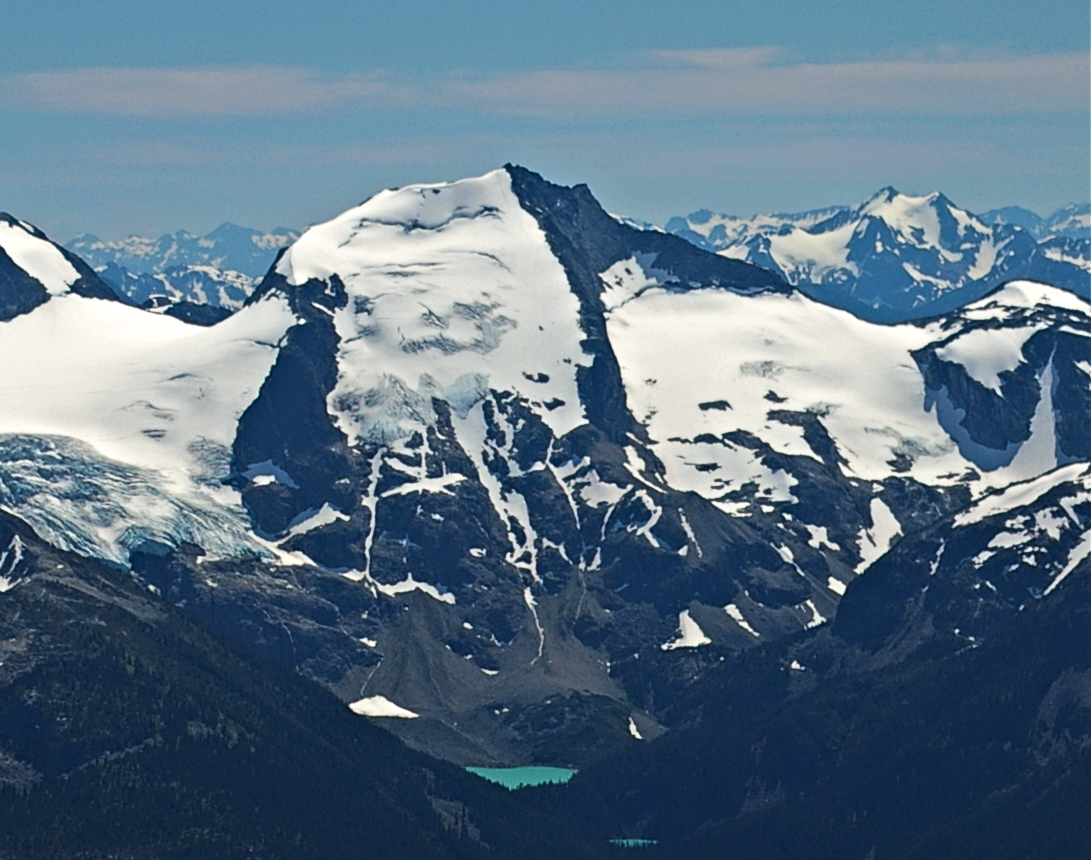
- Slalok Mountain, north aspect, featuring left to right the Matier, Stonecrop, and Tszil Glaciers and Upper Joffre Lake below

Highest point
- Elevation: 2,653 m (8,704 ft)
- Prominence: 333 m (1,093 ft)
- Parent peak: Mount Matier (2783 m)
- Listing: Mountains of British Columbia
- Coordinates: 50°19′39″N 122°28′24″W

Geography
- Location within British Columbia Location within Canada
- Interactive map of Slalok Mountain
- Country: Canada
- Province: British Columbia
- District: Lillooet Land District
- Protected area: Joffre Lakes Provincial Park
- Parent range: Joffre Group; Lillooet Ranges; Coast Ranges
- Topo map: NTS 92J8 Duffey Lake

Climbing
- First ascent: 1963 C. Adam, T. Anderson, G. Richardson
- Easiest route: Scramble, glacier travel

Slalok Mountain, originally known as Rex's Pillar, is a 2,653-metre (8,704-foot) mountain summit located in the Coast Mountains, in Joffre Lakes Provincial Park, in southwestern British Columbia, Canada. It is the third-highest point of the Joffre Group, which is a subset of the Lillooet Ranges. It is situated 24 km (15 mi) east of Pemberton, and 8 km (5 mi) northeast of Lillooet Lake. It is 4 km (2 mi) northeast of Duffey Peak and the nearest higher peak is Mount Matier, 1.9 km (1 mi) to the east. Precipitation runoff from the peak drains into Joffre Creek and Twin One Creek, both tributaries of the Lillooet River. The first ascent of the mountain was made in 1963 by C. Adam, T. Anderson, and G. Richardson. The mountain's name Slalok is the traditional name for the settlement of nearby Mount Currie. The name was officially adopted on June 11, 1979, by the Geographical Names Board of Canada. The mountain and its climate supports the Matier Glacier, Stonecrop Glacier, and Tszil Glacier on the northern slopes.

== Climate ==
Based on the Köppen climate classification, Slalok Mountain is located in a subarctic climate zone of western North America. Most weather fronts originate in the Pacific Ocean, and travel east toward the Coast Mountains where they are forced upward by the range (Orographic lift), causing them to drop their moisture in the form of rain or snowfall. As a result, the Coast Mountains experience high precipitation, especially during the winter months in the form of snowfall. Temperatures can drop below −20 °C with wind chill factors below −30 °C. The months July through September offer the most favorable weather for climbing Slalok Mountain.

== Climbing Routes ==
Established climbing routes on Slalok Mountain:

- Southwest Ridge - class 3
- Matier Glacier - Ski ascent
- Northeast Ridge
- North Face (Stonecrop Glacier)

== Gallery ==
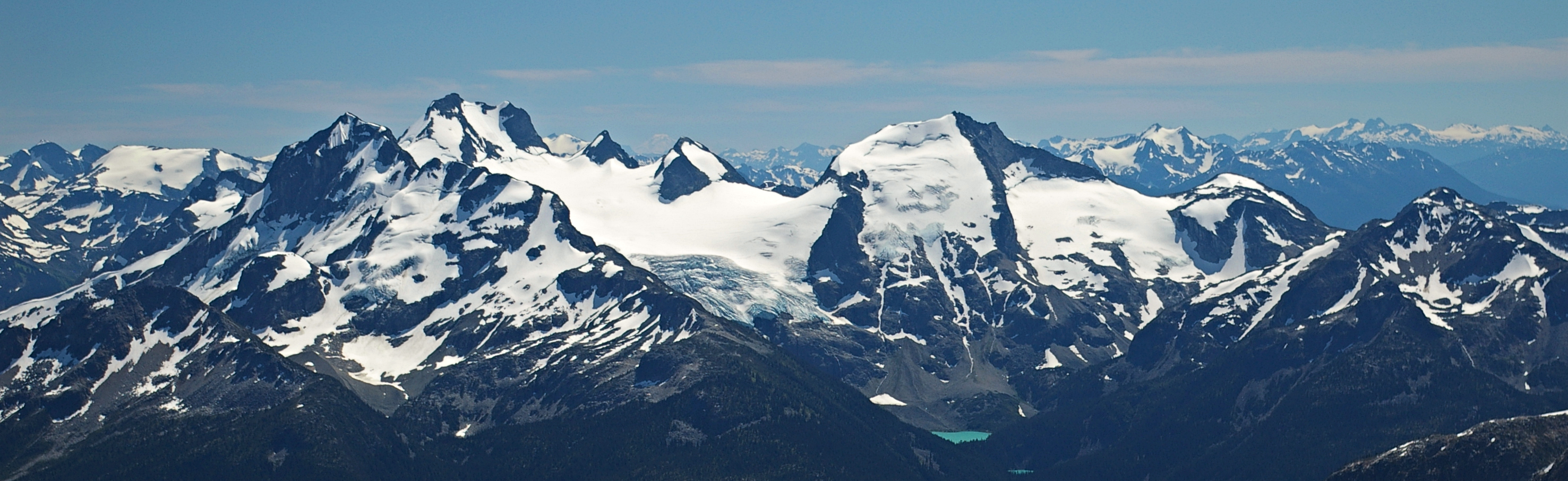
The Joffre Group: Joffre Peak (left), Mt. Matier (highest), Hartzell, Spetch, Slalok Mountain, Tszil, and Taylor (farthest right)

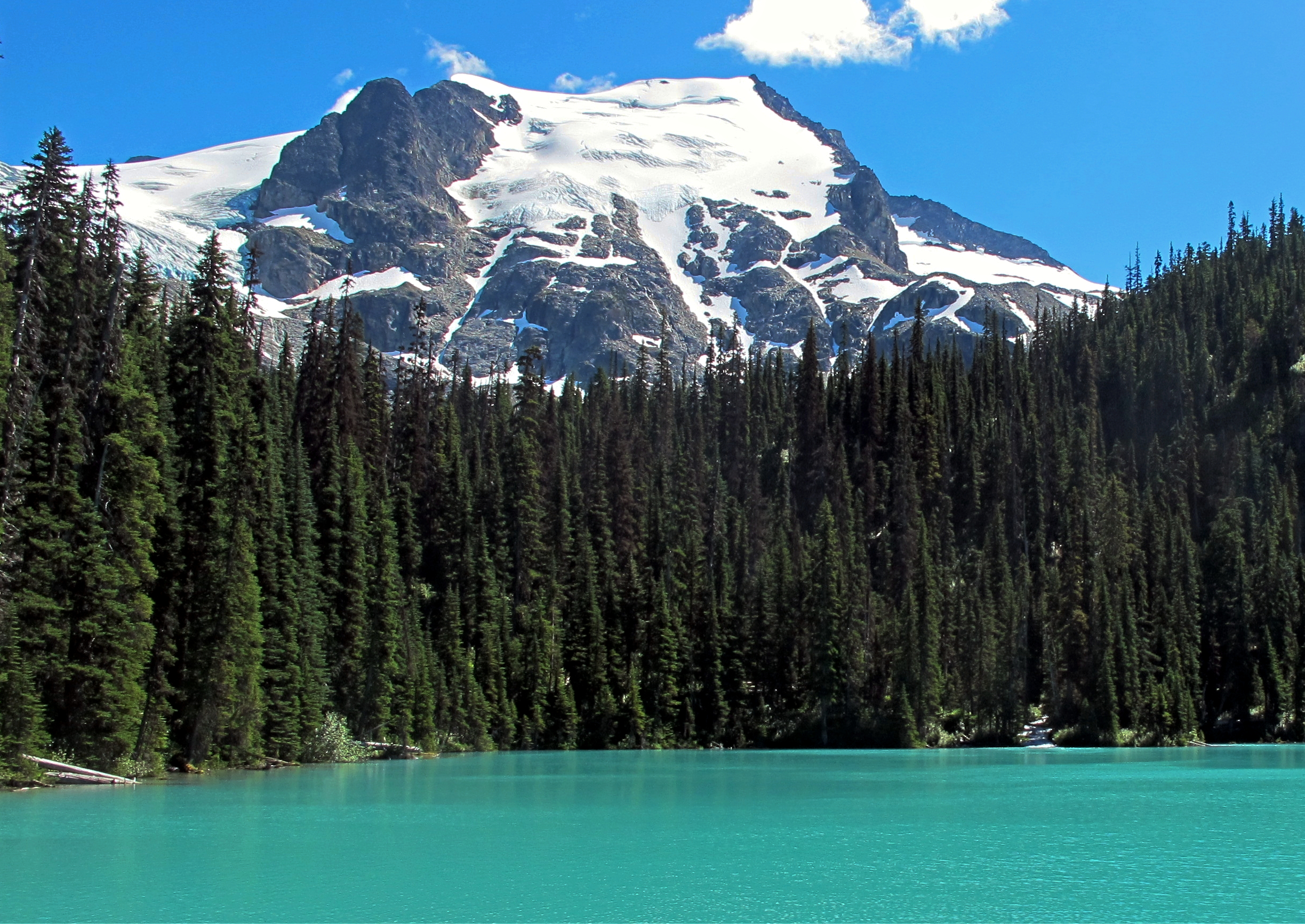
Slalok Mountain from middle Joffre Lake

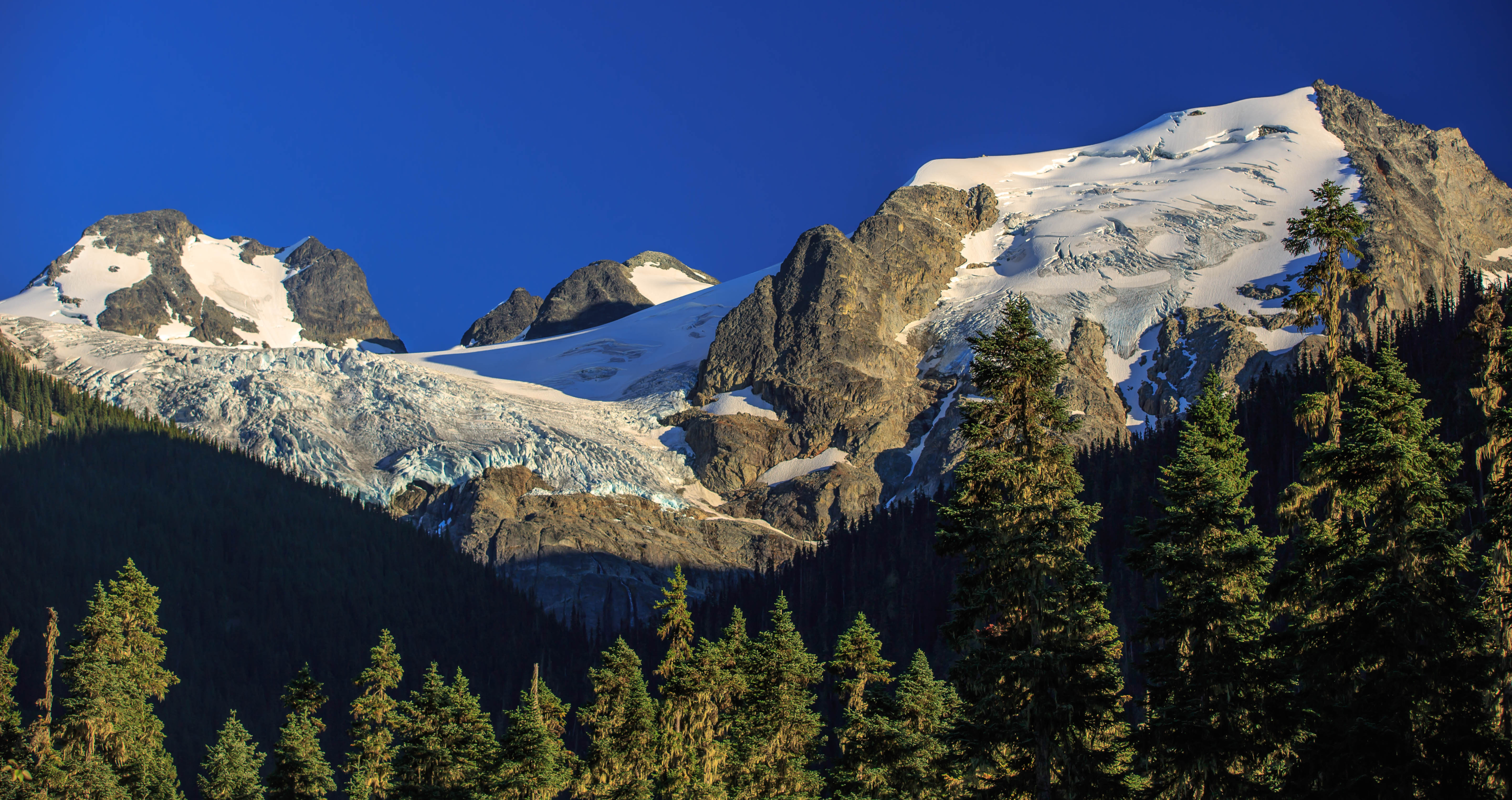
Mt. Matier and Matier Glacier (left), Slalok (right)

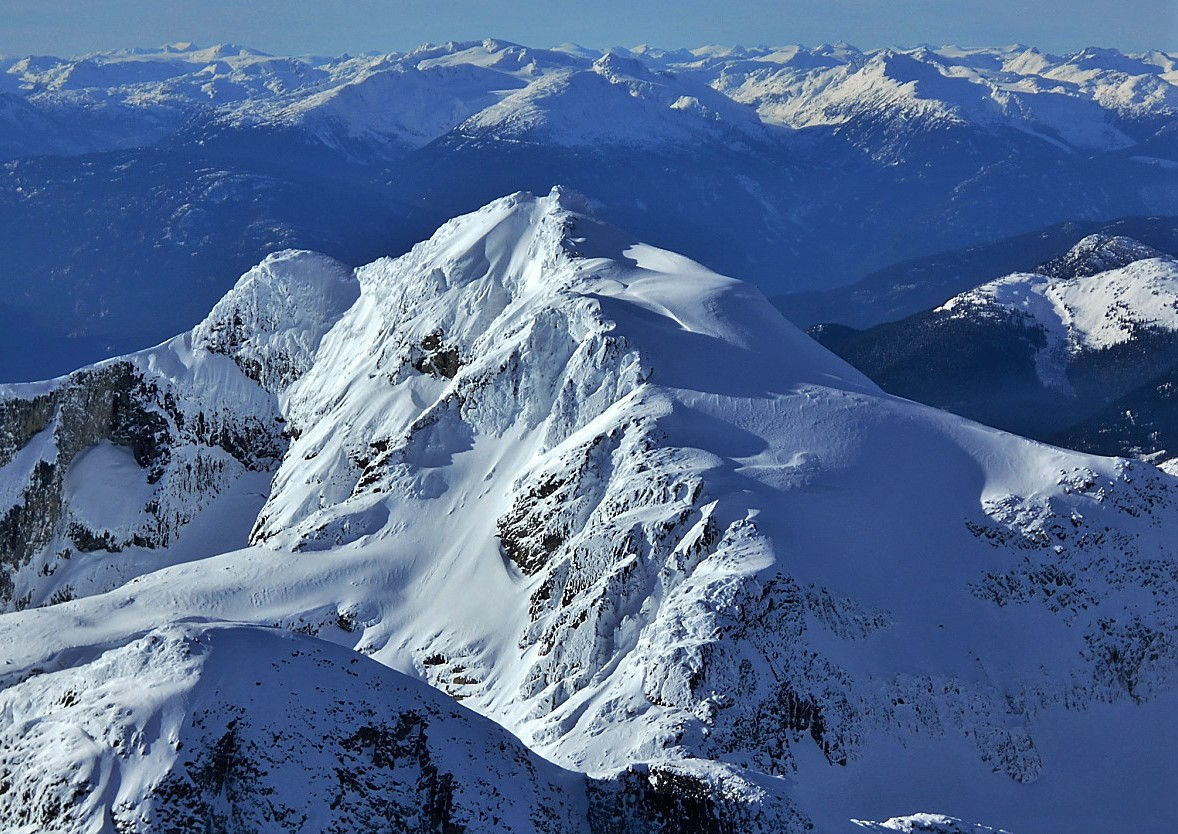
Slalok Mountain viewed from Mt. Matier

== See also ==
- Geography of British Columbia
- Geology of British Columbia
