= Mount Spetch =

Mountain in British Columbia, Canada

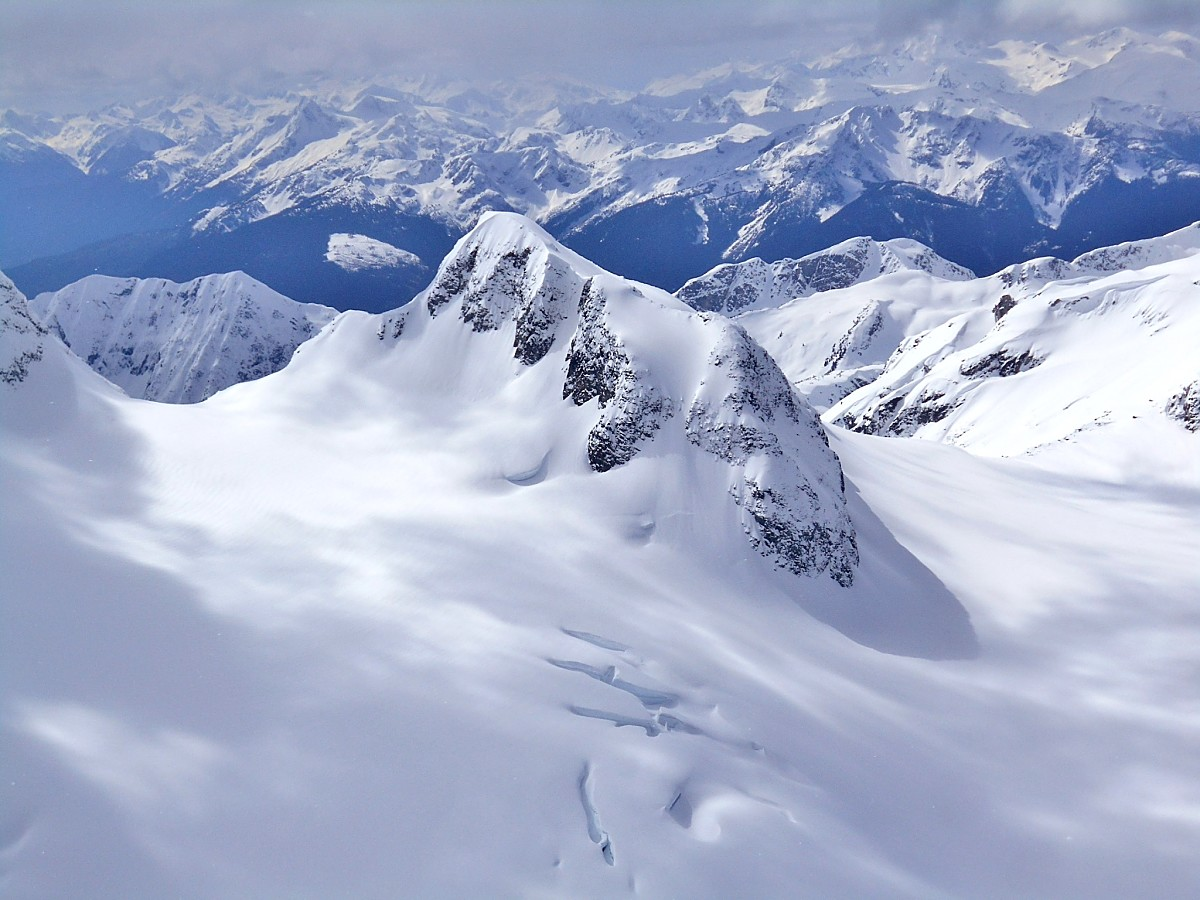
- Mount Spetch seen from Joffre Peak

Highest point
- Elevation: 2,579 m (8,461 ft)
- Prominence: 129 m (423 ft)
- Parent peak: Mount Matier (2783 m)
- Listing: Mountains of British Columbia
- Coordinates: 50°19′35″N 122°27′26″W

Geography
- Location within British Columbia Location within Canada
- Country: Canada
- Province: British Columbia
- District: Lillooet Land District
- Protected area: Joffre Lakes Provincial Park
- Parent range: Joffre Group; Lillooet Ranges; Coast Ranges
- Topo map: NTS 92J8 Duffey Lake

Climbing
- First ascent: 1971 by J. Oswald, G. Walter
- Easiest route: Scramble, glacier travel

Mount Spetch is a 2,579-metre (8,461-foot) mountain summit located in the Coast Mountains, in Joffre Lakes Provincial Park, in southwestern British Columbia, Canada. It is part of the Joffre Group, which is a subset of the Lillooet Ranges. It is situated 25 km (16 mi) east of Pemberton, midway between Mount Matier and Slalok Mountain, both one kilometre either side of Spetch. The mountain's name was submitted by Karl Ricker of the Alpine Club of Canada to honor Samuel W. Spetch, who operated the general store at Birken, and other businesses in Pemberton. The name was officially adopted on January 23, 1979, by the Geographical Names Board of Canada. The first ascent of the mountain was made in 1971 by J. Oswald and G. Walter. Precipitation runoff from the peak drains into Joffre Creek and Twin One Creek, both tributaries of the Lillooet River. The mountain and its climate supports the Matier Glacier on the northern slope.

== Climate ==
Based on the Köppen climate classification, Mount Spetch is located in a subarctic climate zone of western North America. Most weather fronts originate in the Pacific Ocean, and travel east toward the Coast Mountains where they are forced upward by the range (orographic lift), causing them to drop their moisture in the form of rain or snowfall. As a result, the Coast Mountains experience high precipitation, especially during the winter months in the form of snowfall. Temperatures can drop below −20 °C (−4 °F) with wind chill factors below −30 °C (−22 °F). The months July through September offer the most favorable weather for climbing Mount Spetch.

== Climbing routes ==
Established climbing routes on Mount Spetch:

- East Side – class 3 summer ascent with glacier travel
- Northwest Face – winter ascent via steep snow

== Gallery ==
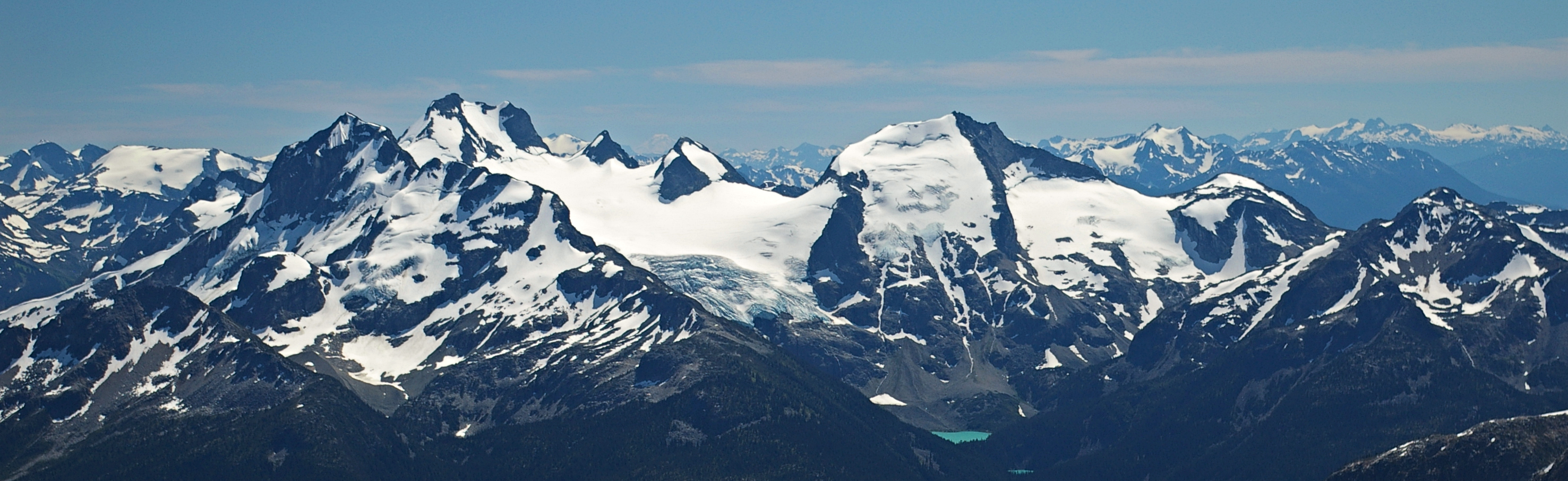
Joffre Group seen from Mount Marriott. Left to right: Joffre, Matier (highest), Mt. Hartzell, Spetch, Slalok Mountain, and Taylor (furthest right)

== See also ==
- Geography of British Columbia
- Geology of British Columbia
