= Mount Hartzell =

Mountain in British Columbia, Canada

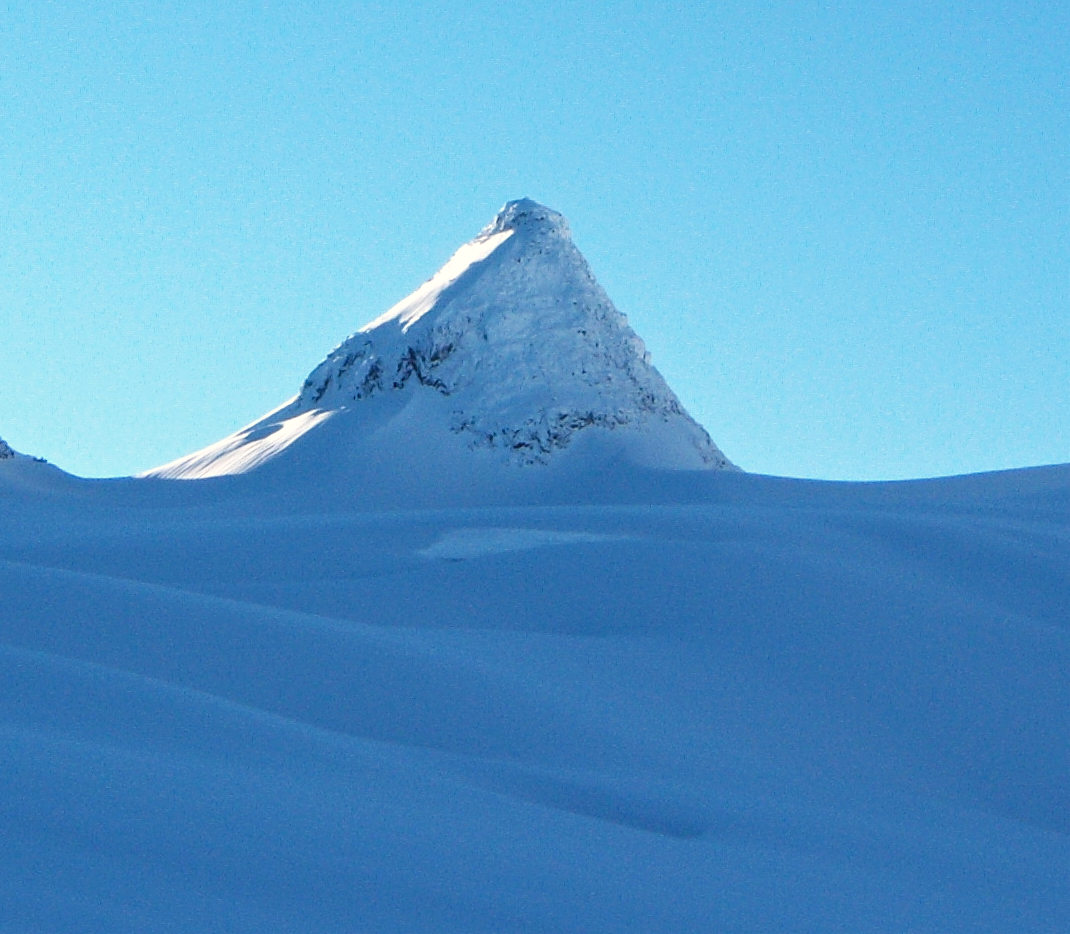
- Mount Hartzell, north aspect as seen from the Matier Glacier

Highest point
- Elevation: 2,615 m (8,579 ft)
- Prominence: 115 m (377 ft)
- Parent peak: Mount Matier (2783 m)
- Listing: Mountains of British Columbia
- Coordinates: 50°19′28″N 122°27′06″W

Geography
- Location within British Columbia Location within Canada
- Interactive map of
- Location: Joffre Lakes Provincial Park; British Columbia, Canada
- District: Lillooet Land District
- Parent range: Joffre Group; Lillooet Ranges; Coast Ranges
- Topo map: NTS 92J8 Duffey Lake

Climbing
- Easiest route: Scramble, glacier travel

Mount Hartzell is a 2,615-metre (8,579-foot) mountain summit located in the Coast Mountains, in Joffre Lakes Provincial Park, in southwestern British Columbia, Canada. It is part of the Joffre Group, which is a subset of the Lillooet Ranges. It is situated 25 km (16 mi) east of Pemberton, midway between Mount Matier and Mount Spetch, each a half kilometre either side of Hartzell. The mountain's name was submitted by Karl Ricker of the Alpine Club of Canada to honor Carl A. Hartzell, an early settler and postmaster at Pemberton. The name was officially adopted on January 23, 1979, by the Geographical Names Board of Canada. Precipitation runoff from the peak drains into Joffre Creek and Twin One Creek, both tributaries of the Lillooet River. The mountain and its climate supports the Hartzell Glacier on the southeast slope, and the Matier Glacier on the northern slope.

== Climate ==
Based on the Köppen climate classification, Mount Hartzell is located in a subarctic climate zone of western North America. Most weather fronts originate in the Pacific Ocean, and travel east toward the Coast Mountains where they are forced upward by the range (Orographic lift), causing them to drop their moisture in the form of rain or snowfall. As a result, the Coast Mountains experience high precipitation, especially during the winter months in the form of snowfall. Winter temperatures can drop below −20 °C with wind chill factors below −30 °C. The months July through September offer the most favorable weather for climbing Mount Hartzell.

== Climbing Routes ==
Established climbing routes on Mount Hartzell:

- East Face - class 3 with glacier travel

== Gallery ==
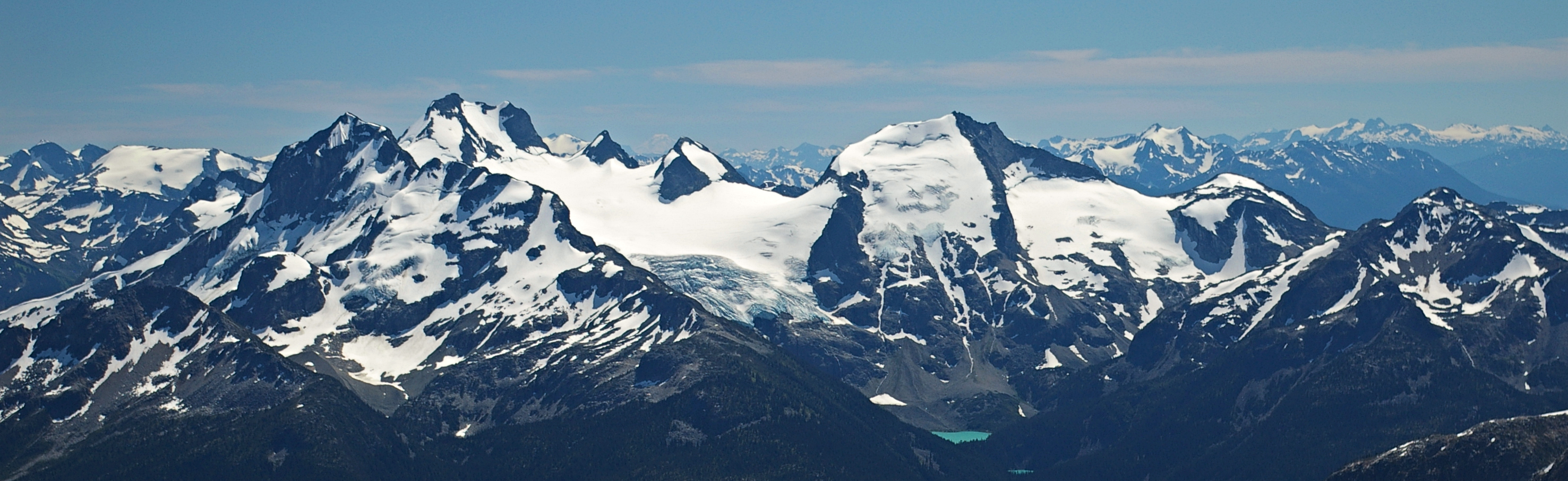
The Joffre Group: Joffre Peak (left), Mt. Matier (highest), Hartzell, Spetch, Slalok Mountain, Tszil, and Mt. Taylor (farthest right)

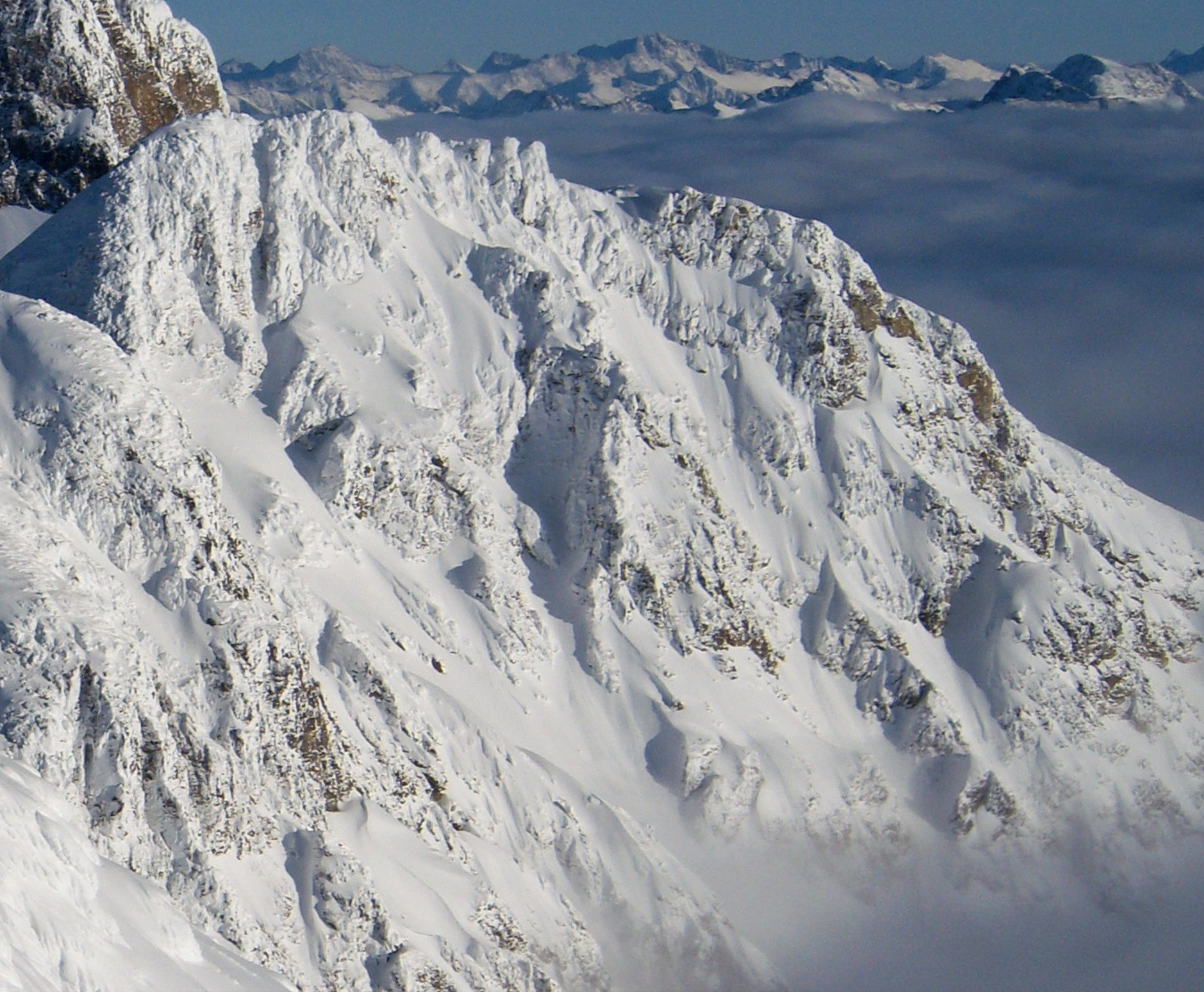
Mount Hartzell's west face as seen from Slalok Mountain

== See also ==
- Geography of British Columbia
- Geology of British Columbia
