= Joffre Lakes Provincial Park =

Provincial park in British Columbia, Canada

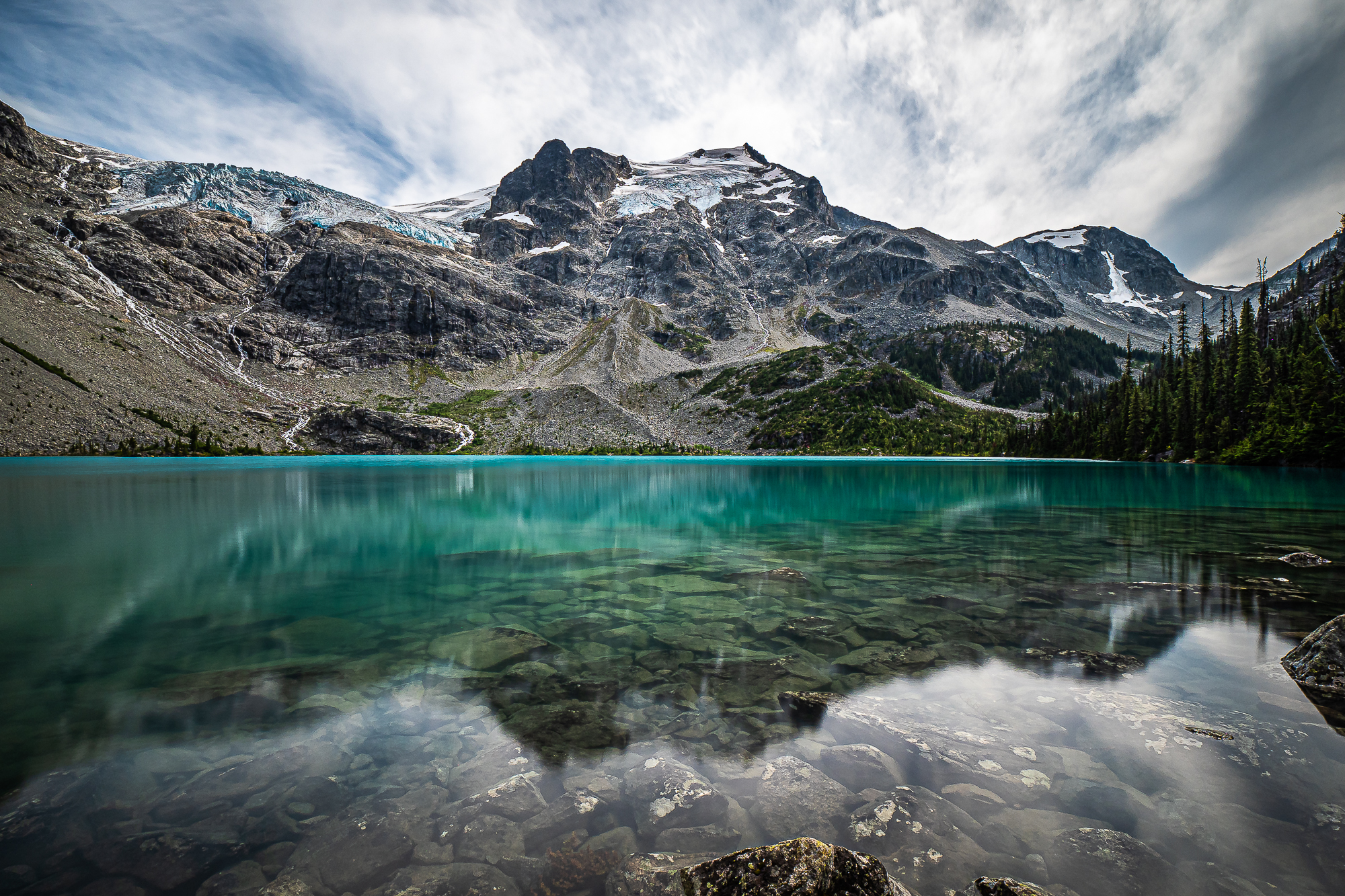
- Upper Joffre Lake
- Interactive map of Joffre Lakes Provincial Park
- Location: Squamish-Lillooet Regional District, British Columbia, Canada
- Nearest city: Pemberton
- Coordinates: 50°20′29″N 122°28′34″W
- Area: 14.87 km^{2} (5.74 mi^{2})
- Created: January 7, 1988
- Operator: BC Parks
- Website: bcparks.ca/joffre-lakes-park/

Joffre Lakes Provincial Park is a class A provincial park located 35 kilometres (22 mi) east of Pemberton in British Columbia, Canada. It was established in 1996, when Joffre Lakes Recreation Area (created 1988) was upgraded to park status.

Three glacier-fed lakes are located in the park: Lower, Middle, and Upper Joffre Lakes. The rock flour in the water reflects blue and green waves, and gives the lakes a turquoise colour. Joffre Lakes is a popular destination for hikers in the summer and mountain climbers in the winter due to its scenic lakes, glaciers and challenging peaks. In recent years the park's popularity has increased dramatically, creating controversy due to the volume of litter in the park and drivers parking dangerously on the adjacent provincial highway.

== Recreation ==
The recreation area is accessed from the parking lot along a 4 kilometres (2.5 mi) trail. Upgrades have been made by the Parks Service in 2017 on this trail, and they hope to continue to upgrade the trail as far as the Middle Joffre Lake. The park has a range of activities to offer such as hiking, mountain climbing, camping and fishing. Summer access in reaching the glaciers requires proper knowledge, equipment and experience. The recommended season to hike here is from June to September. The park is open during the rest of the year, but winter access is only available on skis or snowshoes.

=== Hiking pass system ===
Due to the extreme popularity of the park and the huge increase in users the park was suffering a great level of degradation and BC parks decided to close it in 2020.

In 2021 BC parks decided to reopen the park but limited the amount of visitors with a pilot program based on limited entry for those with a day pass.

== Activities ==
=== Fishing ===
Fishing is permitted in the park with an appropriate license.

=== Hiking ===
Staying on the trail is important for the preservation of the park environment, and for the safety of hikers. Lower Joffre Lake is a short distance away from the parking lot with no elevation gain. The trail to Middle and Upper Joffre lakes however is more challenging due to the greater elevation gain. Hiking beyond Upper lake is not safe (except for mountaineers with equipment and experience) because of the unstable glacial terrain present.

Dogs are not allowed in the park to protect wildlife and the environment.

=== Camping ===
There are 26 small gravel campsites available for campers at the south end of Upper Joffre Lake. One pit toilet, and a bear-proof food storage unit is also available for the convenience of campers. Campfires are prohibited throughout the year.

Reservations are required to camp and cost $6/night for each tent spot. Camping fees are $5/person/night. The campground at Upper Joffre Lake is spread along the shoreline at the southwestern corner of the lake. A handful of campsites are located on a gravel beach, but most sites are flat spots carved out of the rocks of a moraine.

Year round camping is permitted, but camping during the winter is only recommended at the Middle Joffre Lake due to the high avalanche risk.

== Location ==
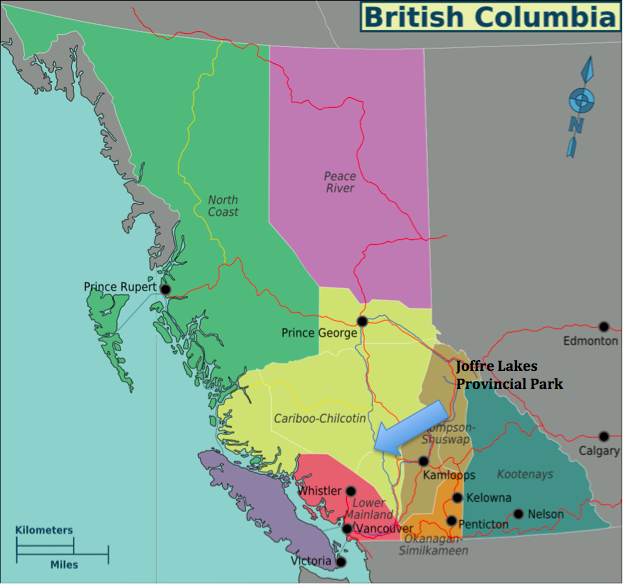

The park is located off Highway 99, east of Pemberton on Duffey Lake Road. To view specific directions, visit the Joffre Lakes.

There is a large parking lot at the base of the trail with free access. An overflow lot located a short walking distance down the road is also available to park at when the main parking lot is full. In order to address overcrowding during peak summer months, BC Parks implemented several safety measures in 2019, including towing vehicles illegally parked on Highway 99, and introducing weekend shuttle bus service that connects Joffre Lakes to Duffey Lake Provincial Park parking lot.

Several operators offer bus service to the park from Vancouver on select days during peak season.

== Trail ==
=== Trail Directions ===
The lower lake is located off of the main trail, and is a 5-minute walk on flat terrain from the trailhead.

The main trail, from the parking lot to the Upper lake, has a distance of 5 kilometres (3.1 mi), and an elevation gain of 370 meters.

Hikers pass through a Moraine about 1.5 kilometres (0.93 mi) into the trail. Trail users are then met by a waterfall located a short distance up the trail from the middle lake.

The terrain following the waterfall is less maintained for the remaining distance up to the upper lake.

=== Trail maintenance ===
The trail at Joffre Lakes has been the site of maintenance and upgrades since 2013. The first part of the trail, leading to the second lake, is a maintained dirt path. It has been supplemented with steps in some of the steeper areas to reduce the trail grade. This has had the effect of the park now being overused. The trail has also been rerouted during the upgrade, and is now slightly shorter than before.

=== Wildlife ===
Joffre Lake is a wild habitat for mule deer, black-tailed deer, black bears and mountain goats during the summer. Some animals such as cougars, bobcats and wolverines are temporarily residents that move past the area.

== Mountains in the Park ==
Mountain name	Elevation
Mount Matier	2783 m
Joffre Peak	2721 m
Slalok Mountain	2653 m
Mount Hartzell	2615 m
Mount Spetch	2579 m
Mount Howard	2551 m
Mount Taylor	2318 m
Tszil Mountain	2377 m
