= Mount Taylor (British Columbia) =

Mountain in the country of Canada

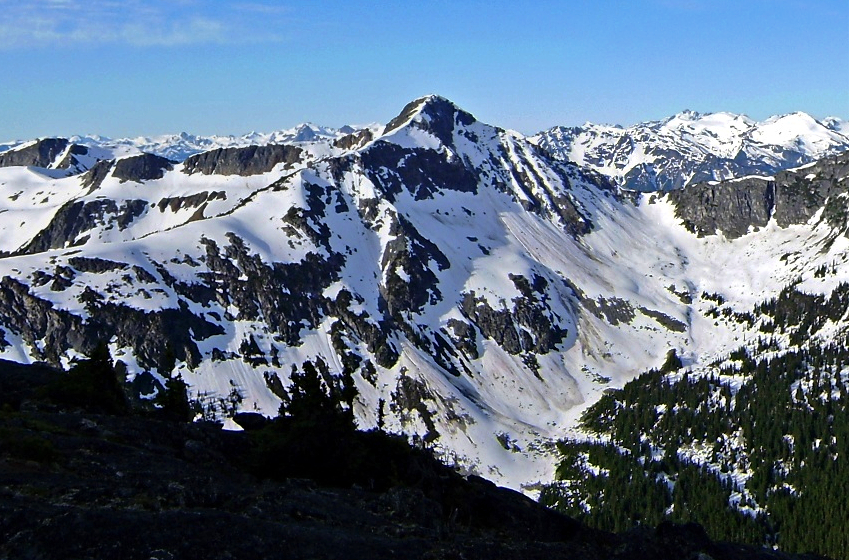
- Mt. Taylor, southeast aspect, from Tszil Mountain

Highest point
- Elevation: 2,318 m (7,605 ft)
- Prominence: 208 m (682 ft)
- Parent peak: Slalok Mountain (2653 m)
- Listing: Mountains of British Columbia
- Coordinates: 50°19′44″N 122°29′58″W

Geography
- Location within British Columbia Location within Canada
- Interactive map of Mount Taylor
- Country: Canada
- Province: British Columbia
- District: Lillooet Land District
- Protected area: Joffre Lakes Provincial Park
- Parent range: Joffre Group; Lillooet Ranges; Coast Mountains
- Topo map: NTS 92J8 Duffey Lake

Climbing
- Easiest route: Scrambling via Southeast Ridge

Mount Taylor is a 2,318-metre (7,605-foot) mountain summit located in the Coast Mountains, in Joffre Lakes Provincial Park, in southwestern British Columbia, Canada. It is part of the Joffre Group, which is a subset of the Lillooet Ranges. It is situated 21 km (13 mi) east of Pemberton, and 7 km (4 mi) northeast of Lillooet Lake. Its nearest higher peak is Slalok Mountain, 1.9 km (1 mi) to the east. Precipitation runoff from the peak drains into Joffre Creek, a tributary of the Lillooet River. The mountain's name was submitted by Karl Ricker of the Alpine Club of Canada to honor Ada C. Taylor, a Pemberton pioneer and the first nurse in that community. The toponym was officially adopted January 23, 1979, by the Geographical Names Board of Canada.

== Climate ==
Based on the Köppen climate classification, Mount Taylor is located in a subarctic climate zone of western North America. Most weather fronts originate in the Pacific Ocean, and travel east toward the Coast Mountains where they are forced upward by the range (Orographic lift), causing them to drop their moisture in the form of rain or snowfall. As a result, the Coast Mountains experience high precipitation, especially during the winter months in the form of snowfall. Temperatures can drop below −20 °C with wind chill factors below −30 °C. The months July through September offer the most favorable weather for climbing Mount Taylor.

== Gallery ==
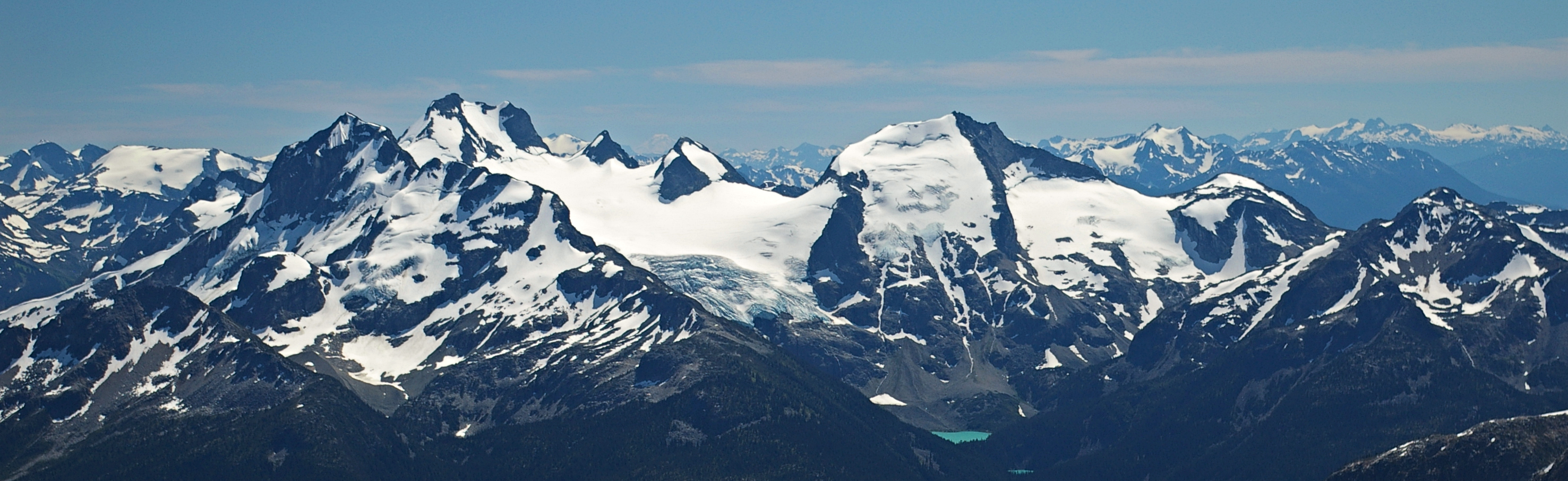
The Joffre Group: Joffre Peak (left), Mt. Matier (highest), Hartzell, Spetch, Slalok Mountain, Tszil, and Taylor (farthest right)

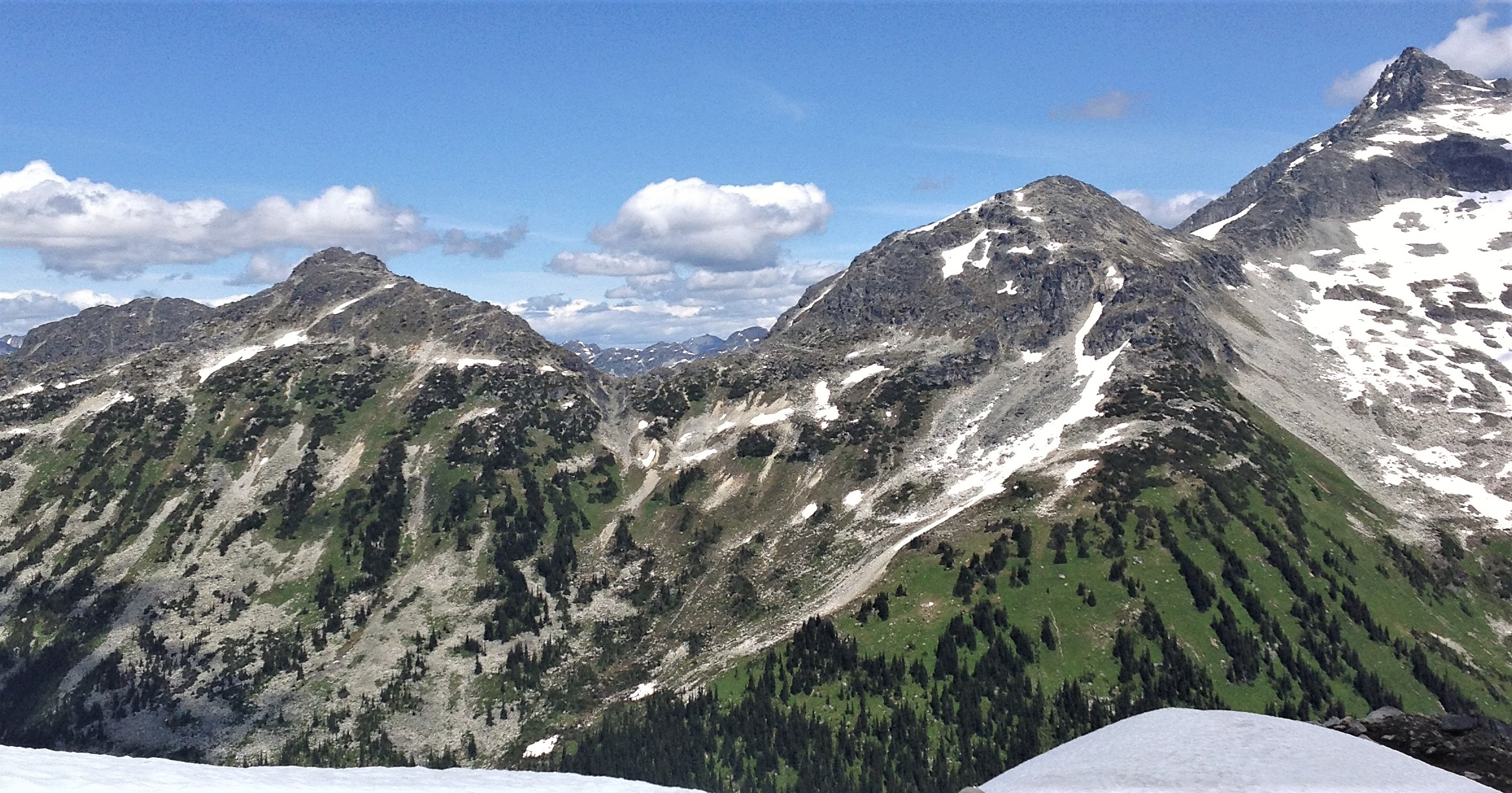
South aspect of Mount Taylor (left), Tszil Mountain (right of center), Slalok Mountain (upper right corner)

== See also ==
- Geography of British Columbia
- Geology of British Columbia
