= Joffre Peak =

Mountain in the country of Canada

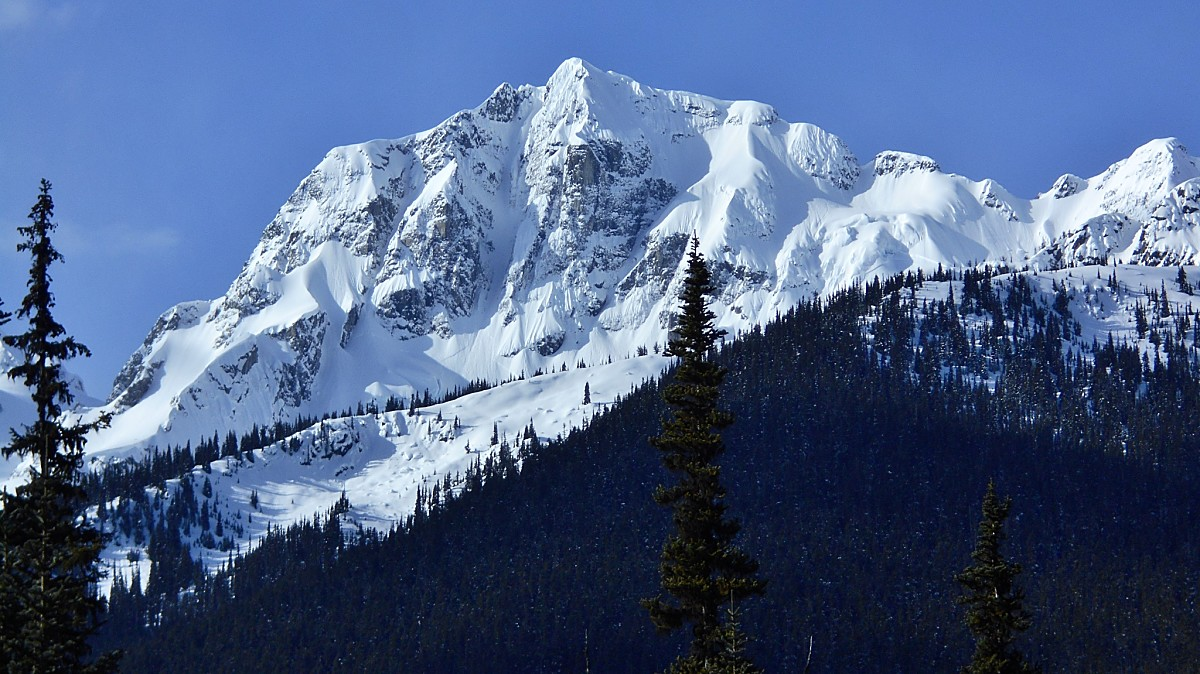
- Joffre Peak, northeast aspect

Highest point
- Elevation: 2,721 m (8,927 ft)
- Prominence: 331 m (1,086 ft)
- Parent peak: Mount Matier (2,783 m)
- Isolation: 1.64 km (1.02 mi)
- Listing: Mountains of British Columbia
- Coordinates: 50°20′28″N 122°26′44″W

Geography
- Location within British Columbia Location within Canada
- Interactive map of Joffre Peak
- Country: Canada
- Province: British Columbia
- Protected area: Joffre Lakes Provincial Park
- Parent range: Joffre Group; Lillooet Ranges; Coast Mountains
- Topo map: NTS 92J8 Duffey Lake

Climbing
- First ascent: 1957 R. Chambers, P. Sherman
- Easiest route: Scrambling, glacier travel

Joffre Peak is a 2,721-metre (8,927-foot) mountain summit located in the Coast Mountains, in Joffre Lakes Provincial Park, in southwestern British Columbia, Canada. It is the second-highest point of the Joffre Group, which is a subset of the Lillooet Ranges. It is situated 26 km (16 mi) east of Pemberton and 11 km (7 mi) northeast of Lillooet Lake. Joffre is more notable for its steep rise above local terrain than for its absolute elevation as topographic relief is significant with the summit rising 1,500 meters (4,920 ft) above Cayoosh Creek in 4 km (2.5 mi). The nearest higher peak is Mount Matier, 1.6 km (1 mi) to the south. The mountain's climate supports the Matier Glacier on the southwest slope, and the Anniversary Glacier on the southeast slope. Precipitation runoff from the peak drains into Joffre Creek and Cayoosh Creek which are within the Fraser River watershed.

== History ==
The first ascent of the mountain was made on July 19, 1957 by Dick Chambers and Paddy Sherman, who were members of the British Columbia Mountaineering Club. The first ascent party named this peak for its position at the head of Joffre Creek. The creek and mountain's name honors Marshal Joseph Jacques Césaire Joffre (1852–1931), a French general who served as Commander-in-Chief of French Armies in World War I. The mountain's toponym was officially adopted on June 22, 1967, by the Geographical Names Board of Canada. Joffre Peak should not be confused with Mount Joffre in the Canadian Rockies which is also named for the same person.

== Climate ==
Based on the Köppen climate classification, Joffre Peak is located in a subarctic climate zone of western North America.

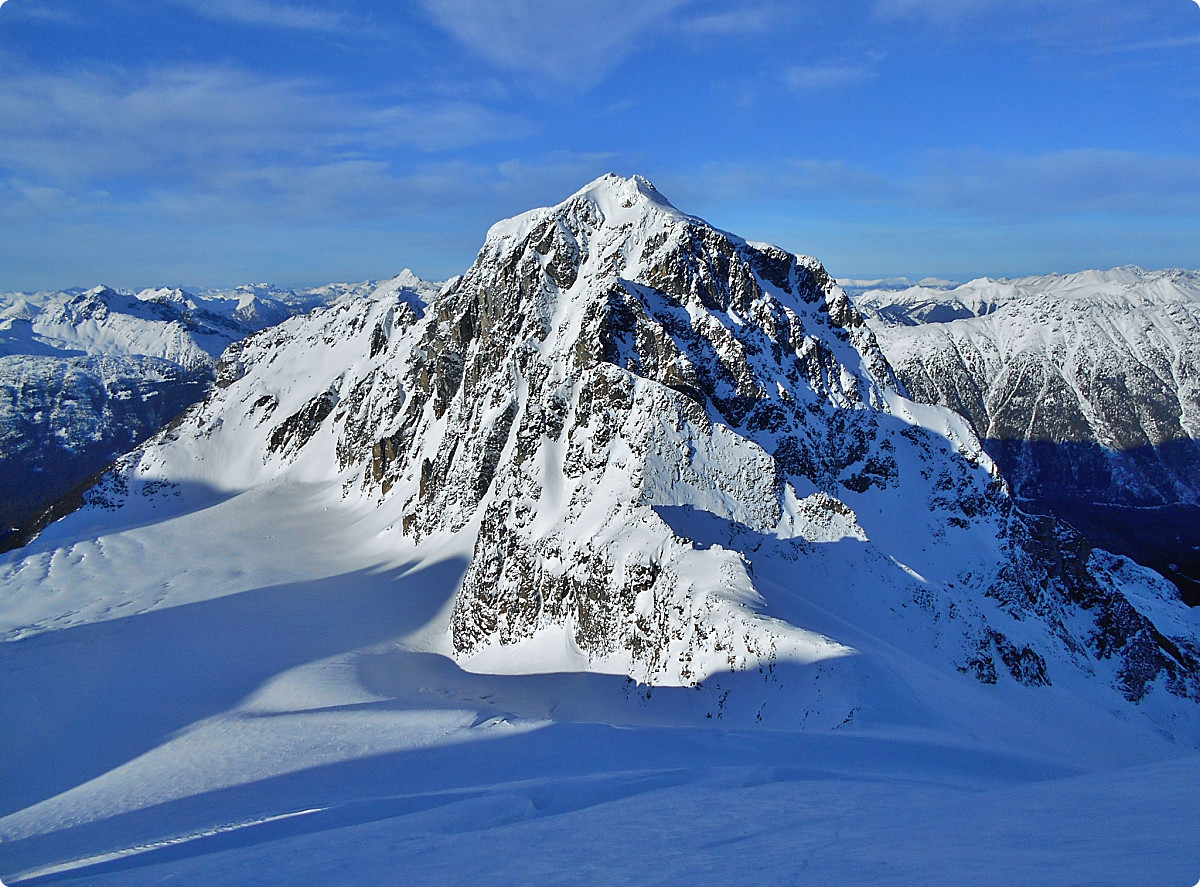
Joffre Peak in winter

Most weather fronts originate in the Pacific Ocean, and travel east toward the Coast Mountains where they are forced upward by the range (Orographic lift), causing them to drop their moisture in the form of rain or snowfall. As a result, the Coast Mountains experience high precipitation, especially during the winter months in the form of snowfall. Winter temperatures can drop below −20 °C with wind chill factors below −30 °C. The months July through September offer the most favorable weather for climbing Joffre Peak.

== Climbing Routes ==
Established climbing routes on Joffre Peak:

- Southeast Face - class 4 First ascent 1957
- Southwest Gully - class 4 FA 1971
- East Ridge - class 5.2 FA 1980

== Gallery ==
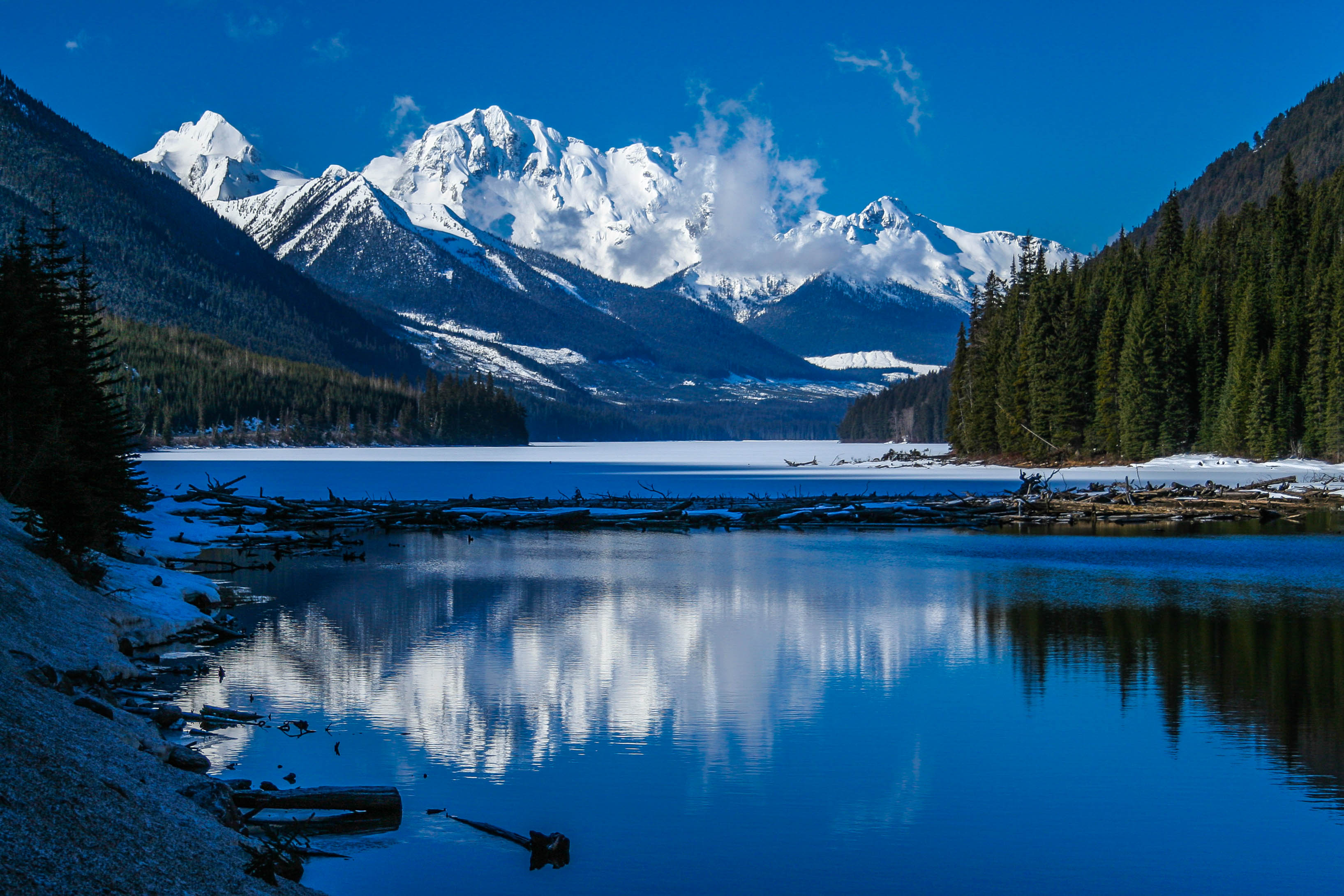
Mt. Matier (left) and Joffre Peak reflected in Duffy Lake

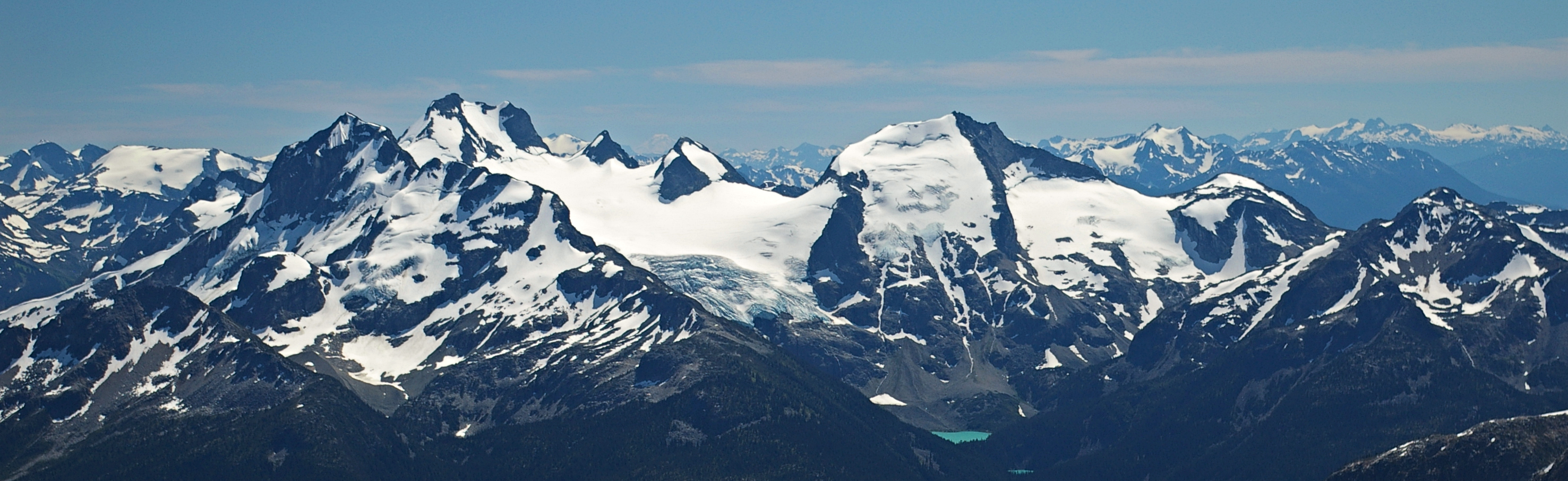
The Joffre Group: Joffre Peak (left), Mt. Matier (highest), Hartzell, Spetch, Slalok Mountain, Tszil, and Mt. Taylor (furthest right)

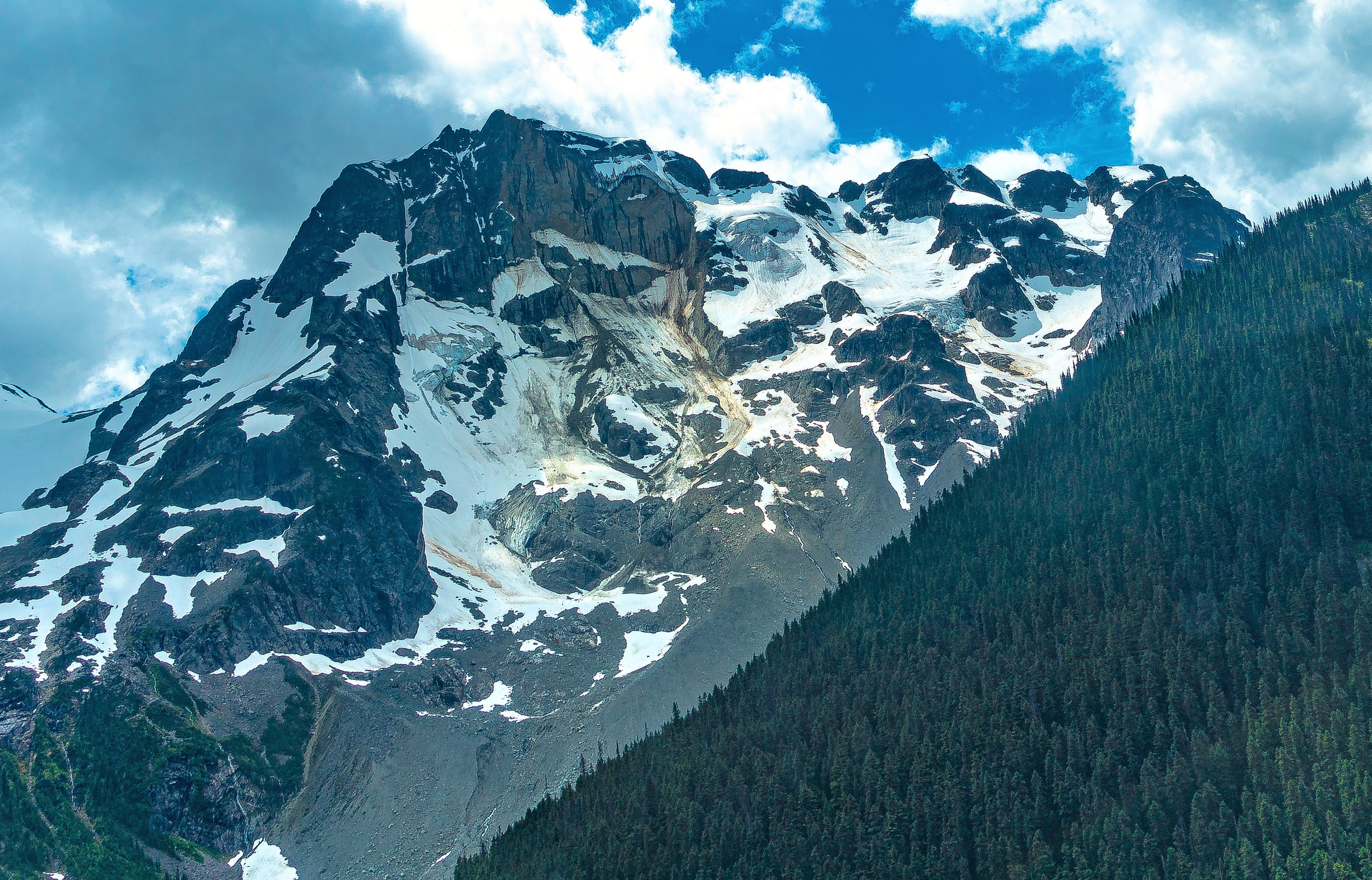
North aspect

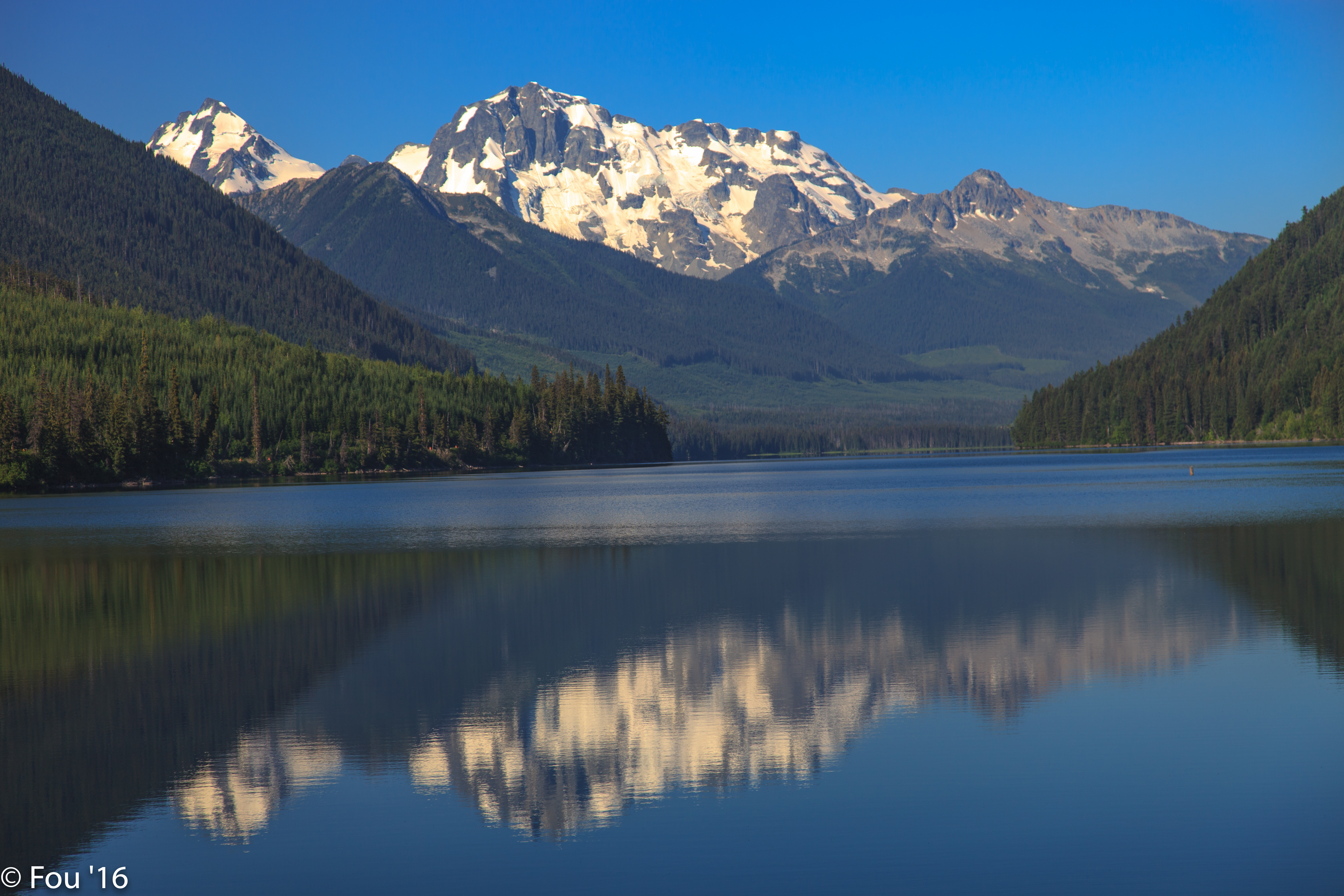
Joffre from Duffy Lake

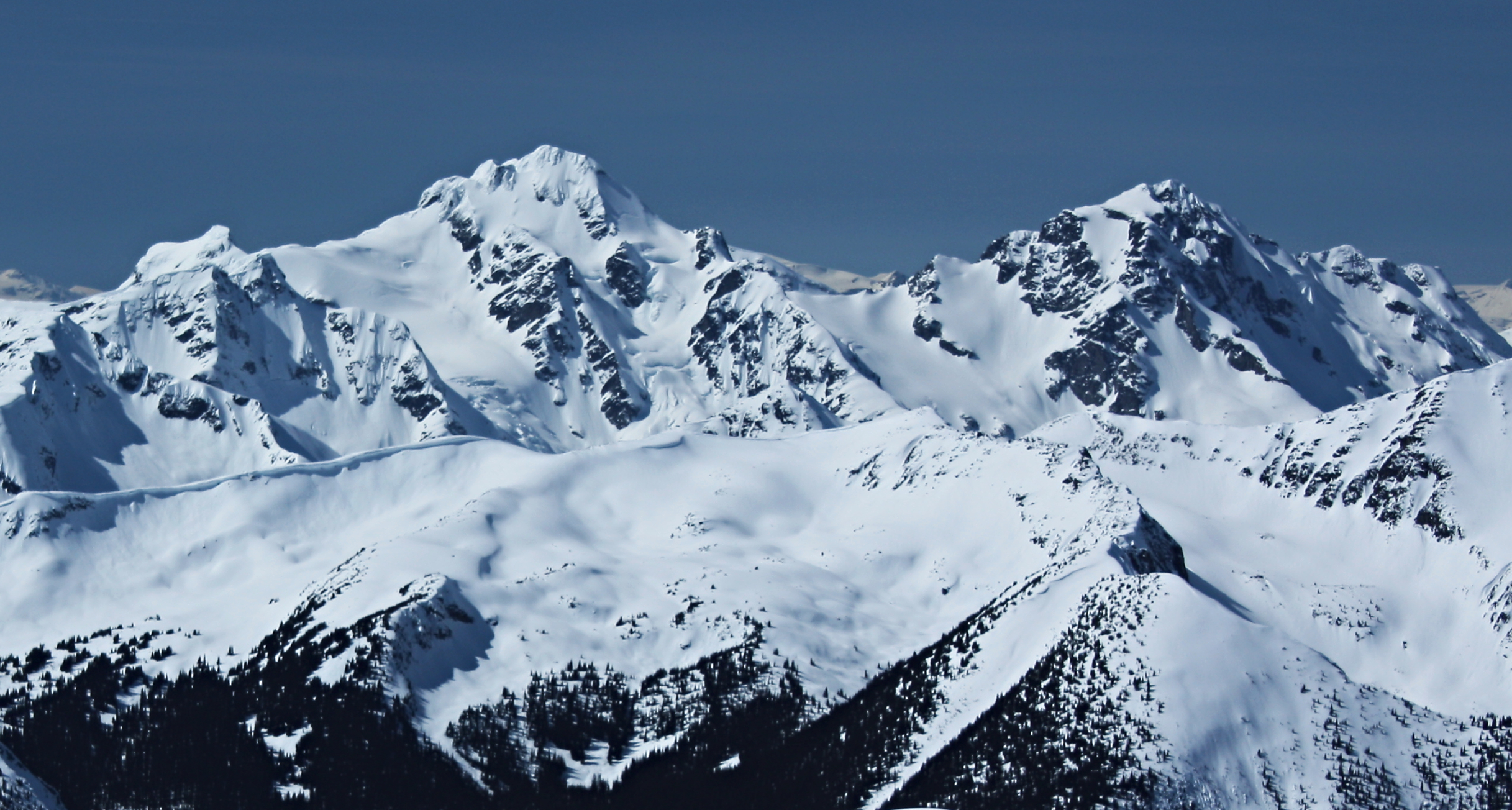
Matier (left) and Joffre (right)

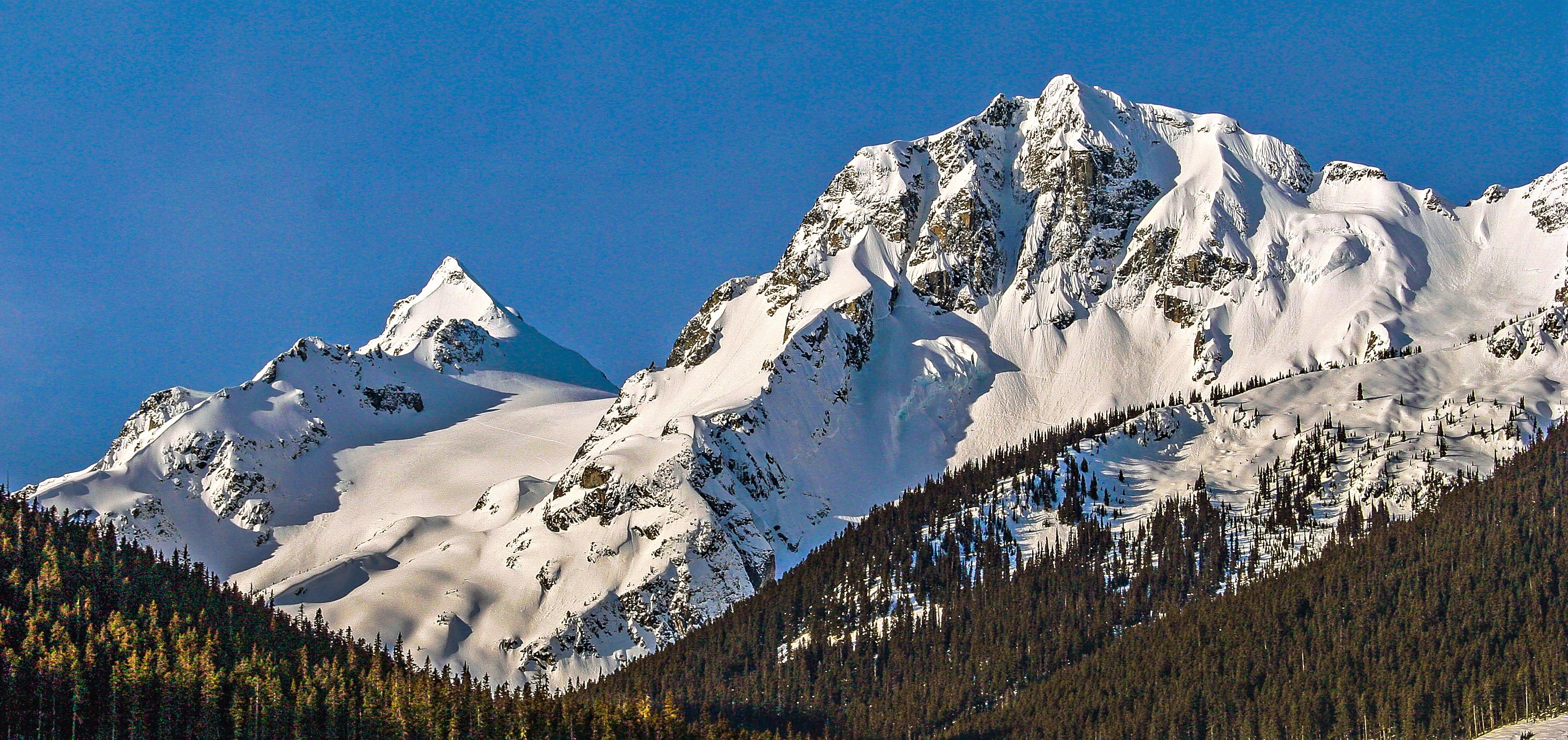
Joffre Peak with Mt. Matier (left)

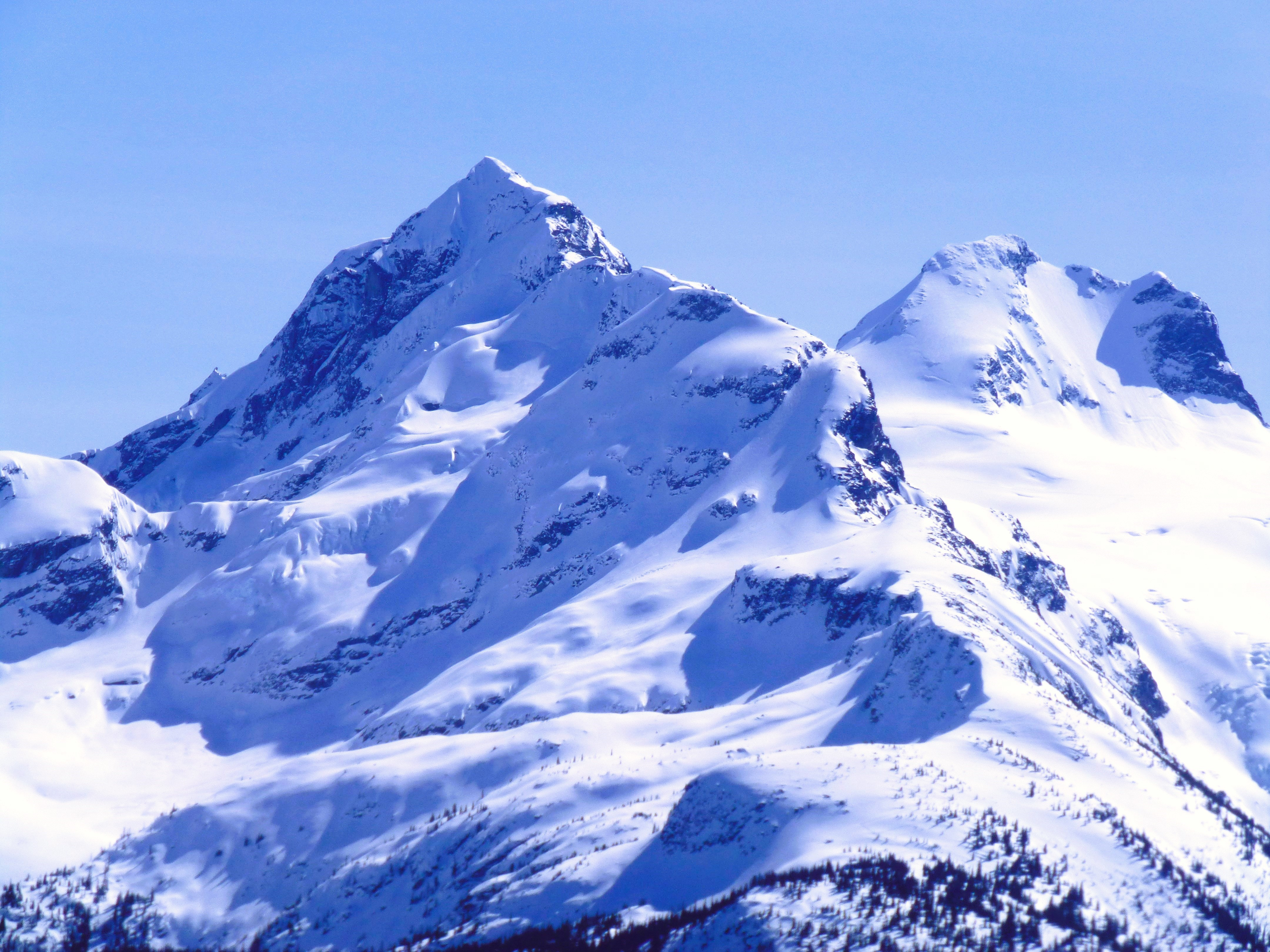
Northwest aspect of Joffre Peak, with Mount Matier (behind right)

== See also ==
- Geography of British Columbia
- Geology of British Columbia
