= Mount Matier =

Mountain in the country of Canada

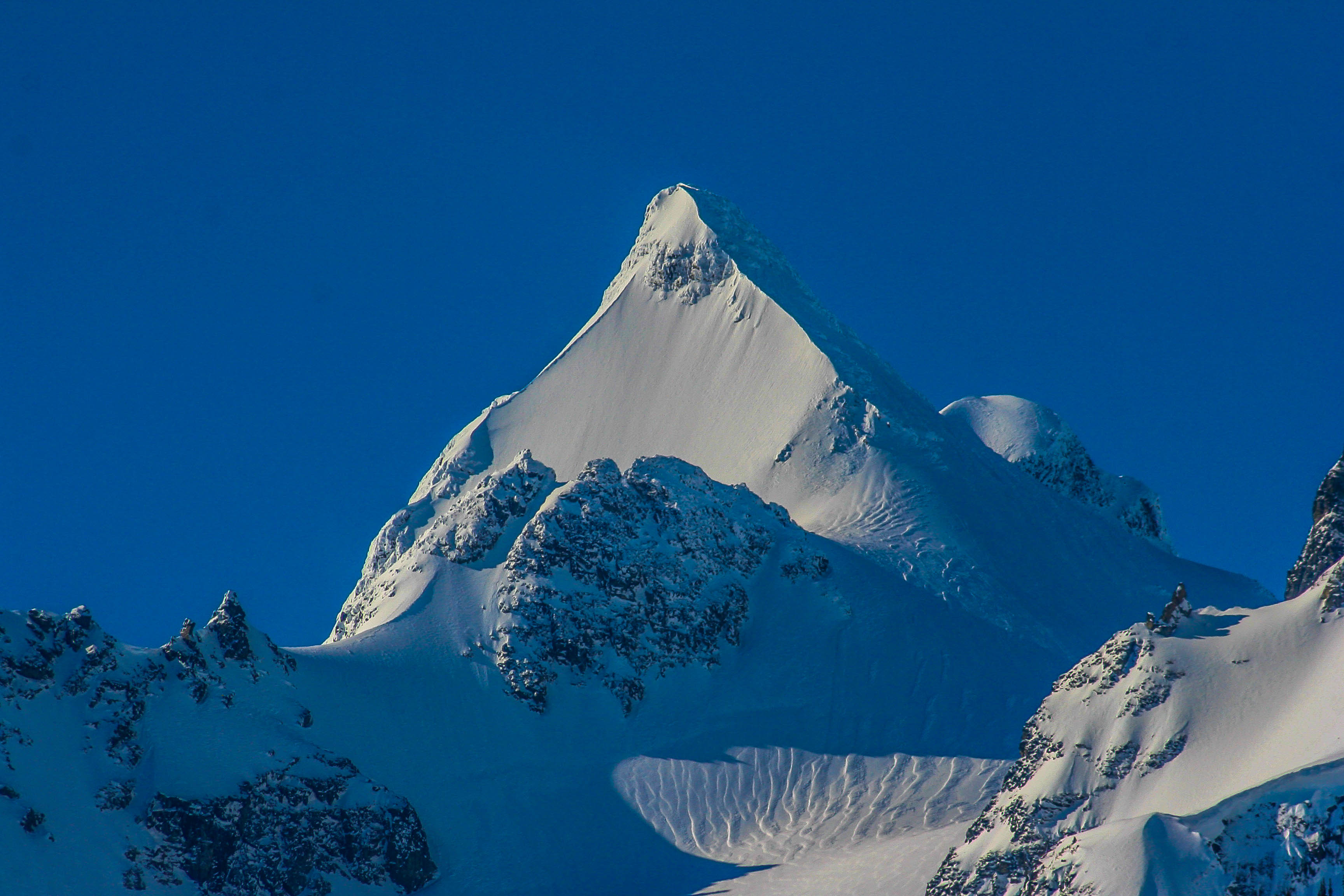
- Mount Matier

Highest point
- Elevation: 2,783 m (9,131 ft)
- Prominence: 1,241 m (4,072 ft)
- Parent peak: Skihist Mountain (2968 m)
- Listing: Mountains of British Columbia
- Coordinates: 50°19′35″N 122°26′37″W

Geography
- Location within British Columbia Location within Canada
- Interactive map of Mount Matier
- Country: Canada
- Province: British Columbia
- District: Lillooet Land District
- Protected areas: Joffre Lakes Provincial Park
- Parent range: Joffre Group; Lillooet Ranges; Coast Mountains
- Topo map: NTS 92J8 Duffey Lake

Climbing
- First ascent: 1957
- Easiest route: Scrambling, glacier travel

Mount Matier is a prominent 2,783-metre (9,131-foot) mountain summit located in the Coast Mountains, in Joffre Lakes Provincial Park, in southwestern British Columbia, Canada. It is the highest point of the Joffre Group, which is a subset range of the Coast Mountains. It is situated 26 km (16 mi) east of Pemberton, and 9 km (6 mi) northeast of Lillooet Lake. Its nearest higher peak is Mount Weart, 30 km (19 mi) to the southwest. The slopes of the mountain are covered by the Matier Glacier on the northwest, Anniversary Glacier on the northeast, Twin One Glacier on the southeast, and Hartzell Glacier to the south. Precipitation runoff from the peak drains into Joffre Creek and Twin One Creek, both tributaries of the Lillooet River.

The first ascent of the mountain was made on August 18, 1957, by Dick Chambers, Joe Hutton, Roy Mason, Paddy Sherman, and Cyril Scott, who were members of the British Columbia Mountaineering Club. The mountain's name honors Tom Matier, an early well-known prospector in the area. The toponym was officially adopted on April 21, 1966, by the Geographical Names Board of Canada.

== Climate ==
Based on the Köppen climate classification, Mount Matier is located in a subarctic climate zone of western North America. Most weather fronts originate in the Pacific Ocean, and travel east toward the Coast Mountains where they are forced upward by the range (Orographic lift), causing them to drop their moisture in the form of rain or snowfall. As a result, the Coast Mountains experience high precipitation, especially during the winter months in the form of snowfall. Temperatures can drop below −20 °C with wind chill factors below −30 °C. The months July through September offer the most favorable weather for climbing Matier.

== Climbing Routes ==
Established climbing routes on Mount Matier:

- North Ridge - class 3 rock, via Anniversary Glacier
- West Face - class 3-4 rock, via Matier Glacier

== Gallery ==
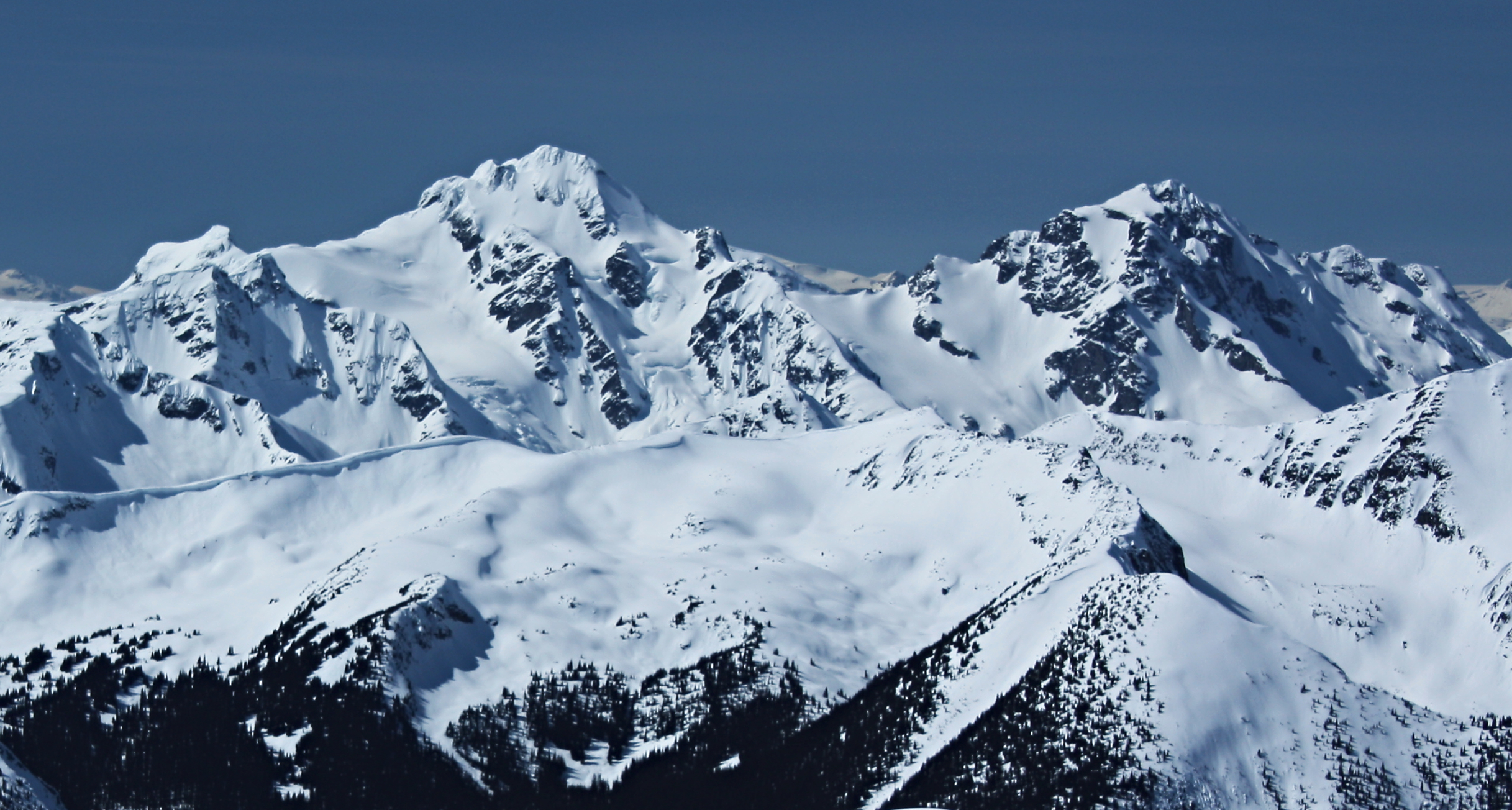
Mt. Matier (left) and Joffre Peak

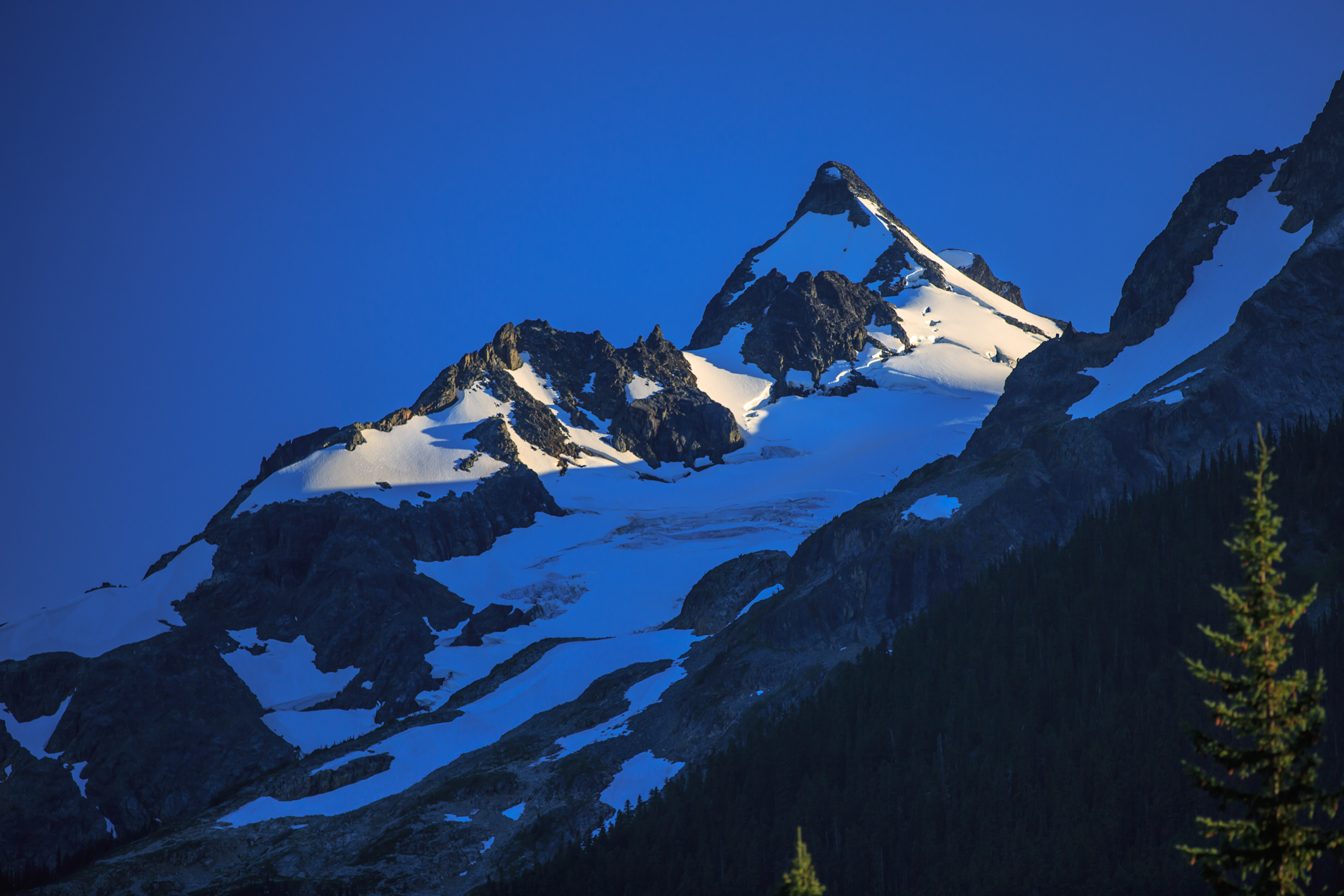
Mount Matier

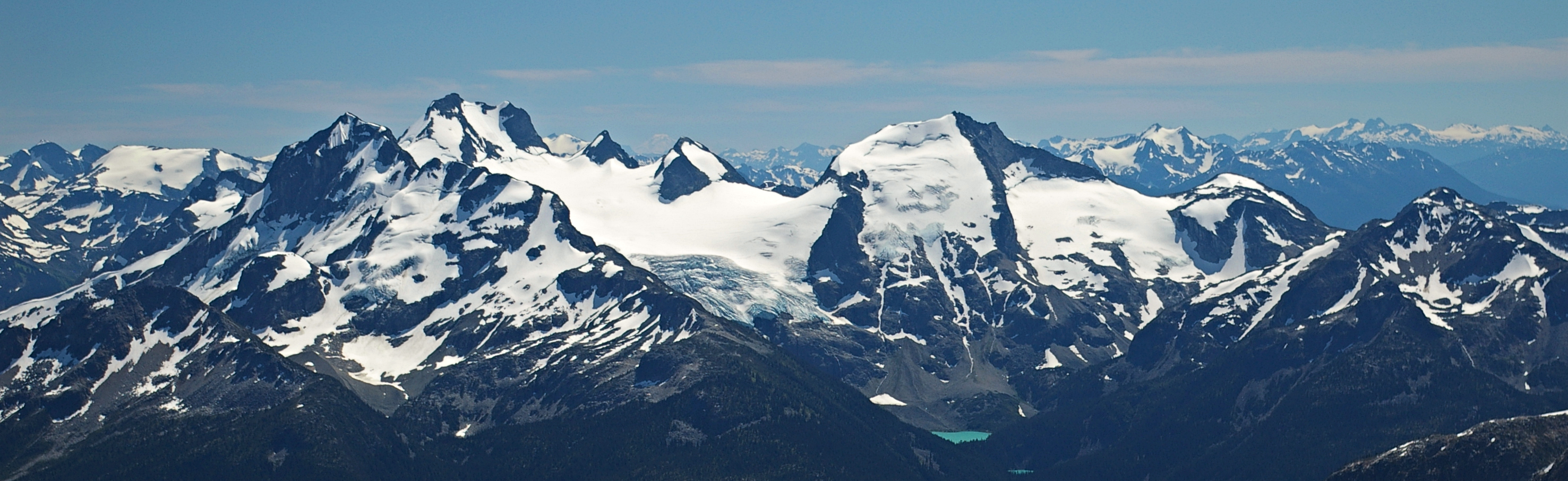
The Joffre Group: Joffre Peak (left), Mt. Matier (highest), Hartzell, Spetch, Slalok Mountain, Tszil, and Taylor (farthest right)

== See also ==
- Geography of British Columbia
- Geology of British Columbia
