= Duffey Lake Provincial Park =

Canadian provincial park

- IUCN category II (national park)
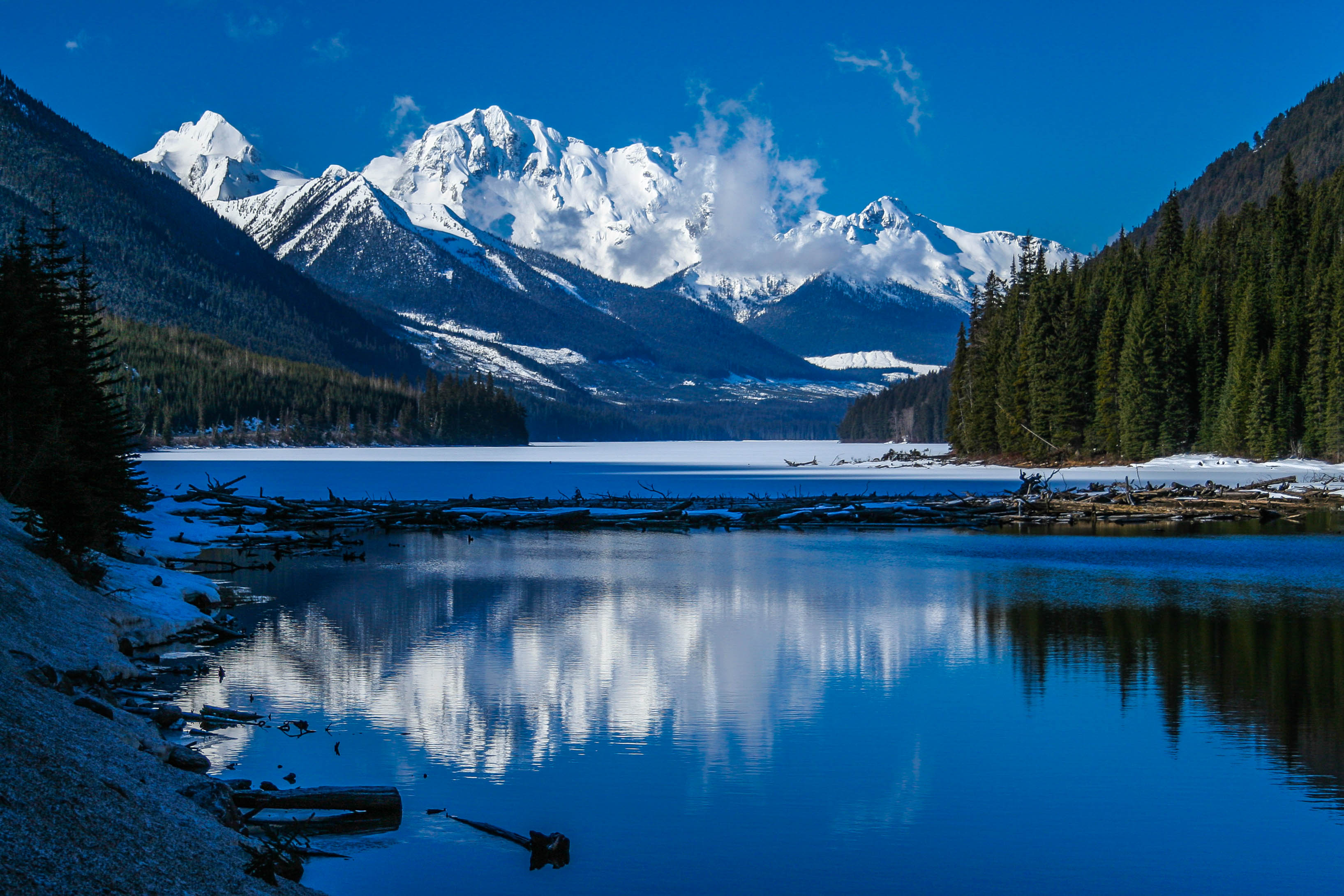
- Joffre Peak as viewed from Highway 99 in Duffey Lake Provincial Park

- Location within British Columbia
- Interactive map of Duffey Lake Provincial Park
- Location: Squamish-Lillooet, British Columbia, Canada
- Nearest city: Pemberton, British Columbia
- Coordinates: 50°24′15″N 122°20′30″W
- Established: 1993
- Governing body: BC Parks

Duffey Lake Provincial Park is a provincial park in British Columbia, Canada, located at the lake of the same name, which lies along BC Highway 99 just east of the summit of Cayoosh Pass. The lake's inflow and outflow are Cayoosh Creek. The park's highest point is Mount Rohr at the westernmost boundary.

== See also ==
- Geography of British Columbia
