= 1956 French legislative election in Upper Volta =

Elections to the French National Assembly were held in Upper Volta on 2 January 1956 as part of the wider French elections. The results saw Gérard Kango Ouédraogo (Progressive Voltaic), Nazi Boni (African Popular Movement), Joseph Conombo and Henri Guissou (Social Party for the Emancipation of the African Masses) elected.

== Results ==
Party	Votes	%	Seats
Social Party for the Emancipation of the African Masses	273,232	43.64	2
Progressive Voltaic List	120,586	19.26	1
African Popular Movement	102,853	16.43	1
African Democratic Rally	71,725	11.46	0
Voltaic Social Republication Action Group	15,777	2.52	0
Voltaic People's Movement	6,268	1.00	0
Independents	35,695	5.70	0
Total	626,136	100.00	4
Valid votes	626,136	98.77	
Invalid/blank votes	7,828	1.23	
Total votes	633,964	100.00	
Registered voters/turnout	978,090	64.82	
Source: De Benoist
