= March 31 =

March 31 this year in various calendars
- Tuesday, 31 March 2026
Akan	Nwonabene
Armenian	14 Ahekani 1475
Aztec	Huei Tecuilhuitl 20, 3 Tōchtli
Babylonian	11 Adaru, 2336 SE
Balinese pawukon	Menga, Beteng, Menala, Paing, Aryang, Anggara of Watugunung, Yama, Ogan, Suka
Bengali	17 Chaitro, BS 1432
Chinese	Yang Wood Dragon・Wings Mansion; Fire Horse Year, Month 2, Day 13 (Chunfen, 5 days until Qingming)
Common Era	31 March 2026 CE
Coptic	22 Paremhat, AM 1742
Egyptian	19 Mesori, 2774 NE
Ethiopian	22 Magābit, 2018 Amätä Məhrät
French Republican	Décade II, Primidi de Germinal de l'Année 234 de la République
Gregorian	31 March, AD 2026
Hebrew	13 Nisan, AM 5786
Hindu	Pūrvaphalgunī・Gaṇḍa; Solar: 18 Caitra, 1947 SE; Lunisolar: Trayodaśī, Śukla pakṣa of Caitra, 2083 VE; Rāudra・5126 KY・1,872,665
Icelandic	Þriðjudagur, 8 Einmánuður 2025
Islamic	12 Shawwal, AH 1447 (using tabular method)
ISO week date	2026-W14-2
Japanese	13 Kisaragi, Reiwa 8 (Shunbun, 5 days until Seimei)
Julian	18 March, AD 2026 (AM 7534)
Julian day	2461131
Korean	13 Tokkidal, 4359 DE
Maya	13.0.13.8.8; 1 Pop, 3 Lamat
Roman	ante diem XV Kalendas Apriles, MMDCCLXXIX AUC
Solar Hijri	11 Farvardin, SH 1405
Tibetan	14 dbo, me pho rta 2153 or 1772 or 1000

<<	March					>>
Su	Mo	Tu	We	Th	Fr	Sa
1	2	3	4	5	6	7
8	9	10	11	12	13	14
15	16	17	18	19	20	21
22	23	24	25	26	27	28
29	30	31
2026

March 31 in recent years
2026 (Tuesday)
2025 (Monday)
2024 (Sunday)
2023 (Friday)
2022 (Thursday)
2021 (Wednesday)
2020 (Tuesday)
2019 (Sunday)
2018 (Saturday)
2017 (Friday)

March 31 is the 90th day of the year (91st in leap years) in the Gregorian calendar; 275 days remain until the end of the year.

== Events ==
=== Pre-1600 ===
- 307 – After divorcing his wife Minervina, Constantine marries Fausta, daughter of the retired Roman emperor Maximian.
- 1146 – Bernard of Clairvaux preaches his famous sermon in a field at Vézelay, urging the necessity of a Second Crusade. Louis VII is present, and joins the Crusade.
- 1174 – A conspiracy against Saladin, aiming to restore the Fatimid Caliphate, is revealed in Cairo, involving senior figures of the former Fatimid regime and the poet Umara al-Yamani. Modern historians doubt the extent and danger of the conspiracy reported in official sources, but its ringleaders will be publicly executed over the following weeks.
- 1272 – Pope Gregory X calls for a General Church Council to discuss reunion of Churches, Crusade to the Holy Land and Church reform.
- 1492 – Ferdinand II of Aragon and Isabella I of Castile sign the Edict of Expulsion of the Jews from Spain, ordering all Jews in their kingdoms to either convert to Christianity or leave the country.
- 1521 – Ferdinand Magellan and fifty of his men came ashore to present-day Limasawa to participate in the first Catholic mass in the Philippines.

=== 1601–1900 ===
- 1657 – The Long Parliament presents the Humble Petition and Advice offering Oliver Cromwell the British throne, which he eventually declines.
- 1706 – The last session of history of the Catalan Courts, the parliament of the Principality of Catalonia, ends. Catalonia's constitutional modernisation passed by the Courts aims to improve the guarantee of individual, political and economic rights (such as the secrecy of correspondence).
- 1717 – A sermon on "The Nature of the Kingdom of Christ" by Benjamin Hoadly, the Bishop of Bangor, preached in the presence of King George I of Great Britain, provokes the Bangorian Controversy.
- 1761 – The 1761 Lisbon earthquake strikes off the Iberian Peninsula with an estimated magnitude of 8.5, six years after another quake destroyed the city.
- 1774 – American Revolution: The Kingdom of Great Britain orders the port of Boston, Massachusetts closed pursuant to the Boston Port Act.
- 1814 – The Sixth Coalition occupies Paris after Napoleon's Grande Armée capitulates.
- 1854 – Commodore Matthew Perry signs the Convention of Kanagawa with the Tokugawa Shogunate, opening the ports of Shimoda and Hakodate to American trade.
- 1885 – The United Kingdom establishes the Bechuanaland Protectorate.
- 1889 – The Eiffel Tower is officially opened.
- 1899 – Philippine–American War: Malolos, capital of the First Philippine Republic, is captured by American forces.

=== 1901–present ===
- 1901 – Rusalka by Antonín Dvořák premieres at the National Opera House in Prague.
- 1905 – Kaiser Wilhelm II of Germany declares his support for Moroccan independence in Tangier, beginning the First Moroccan Crisis.
- 1906 – The Intercollegiate Athletic Association of the United States (later the National Collegiate Athletic Association) is established to set rules for college sports in the United States.
- 1909 – Serbia formally withdraws its opposition to Austro-Hungarian actions in the Bosnian Crisis.
- 1913 – The Vienna Concert Society rioted during a performance of modernist music by Arnold Schoenberg, Alban Berg, Alexander von Zemlinsky, and Anton von Webern, causing a premature end to the concert due to violence; this concert became known as the Skandalkonzert.
- 1917 – According to the terms of the Treaty of the Danish West Indies, the islands become American possessions.
- 1918 – Massacre of ethnic Azerbaijanis is committed by allied armed groups of Armenian Revolutionary Federation and Bolsheviks. Nearly 12,000 Azerbaijani Muslims are killed.
- 1918 – Daylight saving time goes into effect in the United States for the first time.
- 1921 – The Royal Australian Air Force is formed.
- 1930 – The Motion Picture Production Code is instituted, imposing strict guidelines on the treatment of sex, crime, religion and violence in film, in the U.S., for the next thirty-eight years.
- 1931 – An earthquake in Nicaragua destroys Managua; killing 2,000.
- 1931 – A Transcontinental & Western Air airliner crashes near Bazaar, Kansas, killing eight, including University of Notre Dame head football coach Knute Rockne.
- 1933 – The Civilian Conservation Corps is established with the mission of relieving rampant unemployment in the United States.
- 1939 – Events preceding World War II in Europe: Prime Minister Neville Chamberlain pledges British military support to the Second Polish Republic in the event of an invasion by Nazi Germany.
- 1942 – World War II: Japanese forces invade Christmas Island, then a British possession.
- 1945 – World War II: A defecting German pilot delivers a Messerschmitt Me 262A-1, the world's first operational jet-powered fighter aircraft, to the Americans, the first to fall into Allied hands.
- 1949 – The Dominion of Newfoundland joins the Canadian Confederation and becomes the 10th Province of Canada.
- 1951 – Remington Rand delivers the first UNIVAC I computer to the United States Census Bureau.
- 1957 – Elections to the Territorial Assembly of the French colony Upper Volta are held. After the elections PDU and MDV form a government.
- 1958 – In the Canadian federal election, the Progressive Conservatives, led by John Diefenbaker, win the largest percentage of seats in Canadian history, with 208 seats of 265.
- 1959 – The 14th Dalai Lama crosses the border into India and is granted political asylum.
- 1964 – Brazilian General Olímpio Mourão Filho orders his troops to move towards Rio de Janeiro, beginning the coup d'état and 21 years of military dictatorship.
- 1966 – The Soviet Union launches Luna 10 which later becomes the first space probe to enter orbit around the Moon.
- 1966 – The Labour Party under Harold Wilson wins the 1966 United Kingdom general election.
- 1968 – American President Lyndon B. Johnson speaks to the nation of "Steps to Limit the War in Vietnam" in a television address. At the conclusion of his speech, he announces: "I shall not seek, and I will not accept, the nomination of my party for another term as your President."
- 1970 – Explorer 1 re-enters the Earth's atmosphere after 12 years in orbit.
- 1980 – The Chicago, Rock Island and Pacific Railroad operates its final train after being ordered to liquidate its assets because of bankruptcy and debts owed to creditors.
- 1986 – Mexicana de Aviación Flight 940 crashes into the Sierra Madre Oriental mountain range near the Mexican town of Maravatío, killing 167.
- 1990 – Approximately 200,000 protesters take to the streets of London to protest against the newly introduced Poll Tax.
- 1991 – Georgian independence referendum: Nearly 99 percent of the voters support the country's independence from the Soviet Union.
- 1991 – The Warsaw Pact formally disbands.
- 1992 – The USS Missouri, the last active United States Navy battleship, is decommissioned in Long Beach, California.
- 1992 – The Treaty of Federation is signed in Moscow.
- 1993 – The Macao Basic Law is adopted by the Eighth National People's Congress of China to take effect December 20, 1999. Resumption by China of the Exercise of Sovereignty over Macao
- 1995 – Selena is murdered by her fan club president Yolanda Saldívar at a Days Inn in Corpus Christi, Texas.
- 1995 – TAROM Flight 371, an Airbus A310-300, crashes near Balotesti, Romania, killing all 60 people on board.
- 1998 – Netscape releases Mozilla source code under an open source license.
- 2004 – Iraq War in Anbar Province: In Fallujah, Iraq, four American private military contractors working for Blackwater USA, are killed after being ambushed.
- 2005 – The dwarf planet Makemake is discovered by a team led by astronomer Michael E. Brown at the Palomar Observatory.
- 2016 – NASA astronaut Scott Kelly and Roscosmos cosmonaut Mikhail Kornienko return to Earth after a yearlong mission at the International Space Station.
- 2018 – Start of the 2018 Armenian revolution.
- 2023 – A historic tornado outbreak occurs in the American Midwest and South.

== Births ==
=== Pre-1600 ===
- 1360 – Philippa of Lancaster (died 1415)
- 1499 – Pope Pius IV (died 1565)
- 1504 – Guru Angad, Indian religious leader (died 1552)
- 1519 – Henry II of France (died 1559)
- 1536 – Ashikaga Yoshiteru, Japanese shōgun (died 1565)
- 1596 – René Descartes, French mathematician and philosopher (died 1650)

=== 1601–1900 ===
- 1601 – Jakov Mikalja, Italian linguist and lexicographer (died 1654)
- 1621 – Andrew Marvell, English poet and politician (died 1678)
- 1651 – Charles II, Elector Palatine, German husband of Princess Wilhelmine Ernestine of Denmark (died 1685)
- 1675 – Pope Benedict XIV (died 1758)
- 1685 – Johann Sebastian Bach, German composer (died 1750)
- 1718 – Mariana Victoria of Spain (died 1781)
- 1723 – Frederick V of Denmark (died 1766)
- 1730 – Étienne Bézout, French mathematician and theorist (died 1783)
- 1732 – Joseph Haydn, Austrian pianist and composer (died 1809)
- 1740 – Panoutsos Notaras, Greek politician (died 1849)
- 1747 – Johann Abraham Peter Schulz, German pianist and composer (died 1800)
- 1777 – Charles Cagniard de la Tour, French physicist and engineer (died 1859)
- 1778 – Coenraad Jacob Temminck, Dutch zoologist and ornithologist (died 1858)
- 1794 – Thomas McKean Thompson McKennan, American lawyer and politician, 2nd United States Secretary of the Interior (died 1852)
- 1809 – Edward FitzGerald, English poet and translator (died 1883)
- 1809 – Otto Lindblad, Swedish composer (died 1864)
- 1813 – Félix María Zuloaga, Mexican general and unconstitutional interim president (1858 and 1860–1862) (died 1898)
- 1819 – Chlodwig, Prince of Hohenlohe-Schillingsfürst (died 1901)
- 1823 – Mary Boykin Chesnut, American author (died 1886)
- 1833 – Mary Abigail Dodge, American writer and essayist (died 1896)
- 1835 – John La Farge, American artist (died 1910)
- 1847 – Hermann de Pourtalès, Swiss sailor (died 1904)
- 1847 – Yegor Ivanovich Zolotarev, Russian mathematician and theorist (died 1878)
- 1851 – Francis Bell, New Zealand lawyer and politician, 20th Prime Minister of New Zealand (died 1936)
- 1855 – Alfred E. Hunt, American businessman (died 1899)
- 1859 – Emil Fenyvessy, Hungarian actor and screenwriter (died 1924)
- 1865 – Anandi Gopal Joshi, Indian physician (died 1887)
- 1871 – Arthur Griffith, Irish journalist and politician, 3rd President of Dáil Éireann (died 1922)
- 1872 – Sergei Diaghilev, Russian ballet manager and critic, founded the Ballets Russes (died 1929)
- 1874 – Benjamín G. Hill, Mexican revolutionary general, governor of Sonora (died 1920)
- 1874 – Henri Marteau, French violinist and composer (died 1934)
- 1876 – Borisav Stanković, Serbian author (died 1927)
- 1878 – Jack Johnson, American boxer (died 1946)
- 1884 – Adriaan van Maanen, Dutch-American astronomer and academic (died 1946)
- 1885 – Pascin, Bulgarian-American painter and illustrator (died 1930)
- 1890 – Ben Adams, American jumper (died 1961)
- 1890 – William Lawrence Bragg, Australian-English physicist and academic, Nobel Prize laureate (died 1971)
- 1891 – Victor Varconi, Hungarian-American actor and director (died 1976)
- 1893 – Clemens Krauss, Austrian conductor and manager (died 1954)
- 1893 – Herbert Meinhard Mühlpfordt, German physician and historian (died 1982)
- 1895 – Vardis Fisher, American author and academic (died 1968)
- 1900 – Prince Henry, Duke of Gloucester (died 1974)

=== 1901–present ===
- 1905 – Robert Stevenson, English director and screenwriter (died 1986)
- 1905 – George Treweek, Australian rugby league player (died 1991)
- 1906 – Sin-Itiro Tomonaga, Japanese physicist and academic, Nobel Prize laureate (died 1979)
- 1908 – Red Norvo, American vibraphone player and composer (died 1999)
- 1911 – Freddie Green, American guitarist (died 1987)
- 1911 – Elisabeth Grümmer, German soprano (died 1986)
- 1912 – William Lederer, American soldier and author (died 2009)
- 1913 – Etta Baker, African-American singer and guitarist (died 2006)
- 1914 – Octavio Paz, Mexican poet and diplomat, Nobel Prize laureate (died 1998)
- 1914 – Dagmar Lange, Swedish author (died 1991)
- 1915 – Albert Hourani, English historian and author (died 1993)
- 1915 – Shoichi Yokoi, Japanese sergeant (died 1997)
- 1916 – Lucille Bliss, American voice actress (died 2012)
- 1916 – Tommy Bolt, American golfer (died 2008)
- 1916 – John H. Wood, Jr., American lawyer and judge (died 1979)
- 1917 – Dorothy DeLay, American violinist and educator (died 2002)
- 1918 – Ted Post, American director (died 2013)
- 1919 – Frank Akins, American football player (died 1993)
- 1920 – Deborah Cavendish, Duchess of Devonshire, British aristocrat, socialite and author (died 2014)
- 1921 – Lowell Fulson, African-American blues singer-songwriter and guitarist (died 1999)
- 1921 – Peggy Rea, American actress and casting director (died 2011)
- 1921 – John Ugelstad, Norwegian chemical engineer and inventor (died 1997)
- 1922 – Richard Kiley, American actor and singer (died 1999)
- 1922 – Patrick Magee, Irish actor (died 1982)
- 1923 – Don Barksdale, American basketball player (died 1993)
- 1923 – François Sermon, Belgian footballer (died 2013)
- 1924 – Leo Buscaglia, American author and academic (died 1998)
- 1924 – Charles Guggenheim, American director and producer (died 2002)
- 1925 – Jean Coutu, Canadian actor and director (died 1999)
- 1926 – John Fowles, English novelist (died 2005)
- 1926 – Beni Montresor, Italian director, set designer, author, and illustrator (died 2001)
- 1926 – Rocco Petrone, American colonel and engineer (died 2006)
- 1927 – Cesar Chavez, American labor union leader and activist (died 1993)
- 1927 – William Daniels, American actor
- 1927 – Eduardo Martínez Somalo, Spanish cardinal (died 2021)
- 1927 – Vladimir Ilyushin, Russian pilot (died 2010)
- 1927 – Elmer Diedtrich, American businessman and politician (died 2013)
- 1927 – Bud MacPherson, Canadian ice hockey player (died 1988)
- 1928 – Lefty Frizzell, American singer-songwriter and guitarist (died 1975)
- 1928 – Gordie Howe, Canadian ice hockey player (died 2016)
- 1929 – Liz Claiborne, Belgian-American fashion designer, founded Liz Claiborne Inc. (died 2007)
- 1929 – Bert Fields, American lawyer and author (died 2022)
- 1930 – Yehuda Nir, Polish-American psychiatrist (died 2014)
- 1930 – Jim Mutscheller, American football player and coach (died 2015)
- 1931 – Miller Barber, American golfer (died 2013)
- 1931 – Tamara Tyshkevich, Belarusian shot putter (died 1997)
- 1932 – John Jakes, American author (died 2023)
- 1932 – Nagisa Oshima, Japanese director and screenwriter (died 2013)
- 1933 – Anita Carter, American singer-songwriter and bassist (died 1999)
- 1933 – Nichita Stănescu, Romanian poet (died 1983)
- 1934 – Richard Chamberlain, American actor (died 2025)
- 1934 – Shirley Jones, American actress and singer
- 1934 – John D. Loudermilk, American singer-songwriter and guitarist (died 2016)
- 1934 – Grigory Nelyubov, Soviet pilot and cosmonaut (died 1966)
- 1934 – Carlo Rubbia, Italian physicist and academic, Nobel Prize laureate
- 1934 – Kamala Surayya, Indian poet and author (died 2009)
- 1935 – Herb Alpert, American singer-songwriter, trumpet player, and producer
- 1935 – Judith Rossner, American author (died 2005)
- 1936 – Marge Piercy, American poet and novelist
- 1936 – Walter E. Williams, American economist and academic (died 2020)
- 1938 – Patrick Bateson, English biologist and academic (died 2017)
- 1938 – Sheila Dikshit, Indian politician, 22nd Governor of Kerala (died 2019)
- 1938 – Antje Gleichfeld, German runner
- 1938 – Bill Hicke, Canadian ice hockey player, coach, and manager (died 2005)
- 1938 – Jimmy Johnson, American football player (died 2024)
- 1938 – Tõnno Lepmets, Estonian basketball player (died 2005)
- 1938 – Arthur B. Rubinstein, American pianist, composer, and conductor (died 2018)
- 1938 – David Steel, Scottish academic and politician
- 1939 – Zviad Gamsakhurdia, Georgian anthropologist and politician, 1st President of Georgia (died 1993)
- 1939 – Israel Horovitz, American actor, director, and screenwriter (died 2020)
- 1939 – Walker David Miller, American lawyer and judge (died 2013)
- 1939 – Volker Schlöndorff, German director and producer
- 1939 – Karl-Heinz Schnellinger, German footballer (died 2024)
- 1940 – Brian Ackland-Snow, English production designer and art director (died 2013)
- 1940 – Barney Frank, American lawyer and politician (died 2026)
- 1940 – Patrick Leahy, American lawyer and politician
- 1941 – Franco Bonvicini, Italian author and illustrator (died 1995)
- 1941 – Faith Leech, Australian swimmer (died 2013)
- 1942 – Ulla Hoffmann, Swedish politician
- 1942 – Hugh McCracken, American guitarist and producer (died 2013)
- 1942 – Michael Savage, American far-right radio host and author
- 1943 – Roy Andersson, Swedish director and screenwriter
- 1943 – Deirdre Clancy, English costume designer
- 1943 – Christopher Walken, American actor
- 1944 – Pascal Danel, French singer-songwriter
- 1944 – Angus King, American politician
- 1944 – Mick Ralphs, English singer-songwriter and guitarist (died 2025)
- 1945 – Edwin Catmull, American computer scientist and engineer
- 1945 – Gabe Kaplan, American actor and comedian
- 1945 – Myfanwy Talog, Welsh actress (died 1995)
- 1946 – Gonzalo Márquez, Venezuelan baseball player (died 1984)
- 1946 – Bob Russell, English politician
- 1947 – Augustin Banyaga, Rwandan-American mathematician and academic
- 1947 – Wendy Overton, American tennis player
- 1947 – Kristian Blak, Danish-Faroese pianist, composer, and producer
- 1947 – Don Foster, English academic and politician
- 1947 – César Gaviria, Colombian economist and politician, 36th President of Colombia
- 1947 – Eliyahu M. Goldratt, Israeli physicist and economist (died 2011)
- 1948 – Gary Doer, Canadian politician and diplomat, 20th Premier of Manitoba
- 1948 – Al Gore, American soldier and politician, 45th Vice President of the United States and Nobel Prize laureate
- 1948 – Rhea Perlman, American actress
- 1948 – Gustaaf Van Cauter, Belgian cyclist
- 1949 – Gilles Gilbert, Canadian ice hockey player (died 2023)
- 1950 – András Adorján, Hungarian chess player and author (died 2023)
- 1950 – Ed Marinaro, American football player and actor
- 1950 – Sandra Morgen, American anthropologist and academic (died 2016)
- 1953 – Dennis Kamakahi, American guitarist and composer (died 2014)
- 1955 – Svetozar Marović, President of Serbia and Montenegro
- 1955 – Angus Young, Scottish-Australian guitarist and songwriter
- 1957 – Alan Duncan, English businessman and politician, former Shadow Leader of the House of Commons
- 1958 – Andrea Kuntzl, Austrian politician
- 1959 – Markus Hediger, Swiss poet and translator
- 1961 – Ron Brown, American sprinter and football player
- 1961 – Howard Gordon, American screenwriter and producer
- 1962 – Olli Rehn, Finnish footballer and politician
- 1962 – Georgios Stefanopoulos, Greek boxer
- 1963 – Paul Mercurio, Australian actor and dancer
- 1964 – Mark Hoban, English accountant and politician
- 1965 – Tom Barrasso, American ice hockey player and coach
- 1965 – Patty Fendick, American tennis player and coach
- 1965 – Jean-Christophe Lafaille, French mountaineer (died 2006)
- 1965 – William McNamara, American actor and producer
- 1965 – Steven T. Seagle, American author and screenwriter
- 1966 – Roger Black, English runner and journalist
- 1966 – Nick Firestone, American race car driver
- 1968 – César Sampaio, Brazilian footballer
- 1969 – Annabelle Neilson, British socialite (died 2018)
- 1969 – Nyamko Sabuni, Burundian-Swedish politician
- 1969 – Steve Smith, American basketball player and sportscaster
- 1970 – Alenka Bratušek, Slovenian politician, 7th Prime Minister of Slovenia
- 1970 – Linn Skåber, Norwegian actress and writer
- 1971 – Demetris Assiotis, Cypriot footballer
- 1971 – Martin Atkinson, English footballer and referee
- 1971 – Pavel Bure, Russian ice hockey player
- 1971 – Craig McCracken, American animator, producer, and screenwriter
- 1971 – Ewan McGregor, Scottish actor
- 1972 – Alejandro Amenábar, Chilean-Spanish director and screenwriter
- 1972 – Andrew Bowen, American actor, producer, and screenwriter
- 1972 – Luca Gentili, Italian footballer and coach
- 1972 – Hristos Polihroniou, Greek hammer thrower
- 1972 – Evan Williams, American businessman, co-founded Twitter and Pyra Labs
- 1973 – Christopher Hampson, English ballet dancer and choreographer
- 1974 – Benjamin Eicher, German director, producer, and screenwriter
- 1974 – Natali, Russian singer, composer and songwriter
- 1974 – Stefan Olsdal, Swedish bass player
- 1974 – Jani Sievinen, Finnish swimmer
- 1975 – Makis Dreliozis, Greek basketball player
- 1975 – Adam Green, American director, producer, and screenwriter
- 1975 – Nathan Grey, Australian rugby player and coach
- 1975 – Cameron Murray, Scottish rugby player
- 1975 – Ryan Rupe, American baseball player
- 1976 – Howard Frier, American basketball player
- 1976 – Igors Sļesarčuks, Latvian-Russian footballer
- 1976 – Graeme Smith, Scottish swimmer
- 1977 – Toshiya, Japanese bass player, songwriter, and producer
- 1977 – Garth Tander, Australian race car driver
- 1978 – Michael Clark, Australian cricketer and footballer
- 1978 – Stephen Clemence, English footballer and manager
- 1978 – Jarrod Cooper, American football player
- 1978 – Jérôme Rothen, French footballer
- 1979 – Omri Afek, Israeli footballer
- 1979 – Euan Burton, Scottish martial artist and coach
- 1979 – Alexis Ferrero, Argentinian footballer
- 1979 – Charlie Manning, American baseball player
- 1979 – Jonna Mendes, American skier
- 1979 – Rhys Wesser, Australian rugby league player
- 1980 – Martin Albrechtsen, Danish footballer
- 1980 – Karolina Lassbo, Swedish lawyer and blogger
- 1980 – Matias Concha, Swedish footballer
- 1980 – Kate Micucci, American singer-songwriter, guitarist, and actress
- 1980 – Michael Ryder, Canadian ice hockey player
- 1980 – Maaya Sakamoto, Japanese actress, voice actress and singer
- 1981 – Ryan Bingham, American singer-songwriter and guitarist
- 1981 – Thomas Chatelle, Belgian footballer
- 1981 – Han Tae-you, South Korean footballer
- 1981 – Pa Dembo Touray, Gambian footballer
- 1981 – Maarten van der Weijden, Dutch swimmer
- 1982 – Tal Ben Haim, Israeli footballer
- 1982 – Mira Bellwether, American author, artist, and sex educator (died 2022)
- 1982 – Bam Childress, American football player
- 1982 – Brian Tyree Henry, American actor
- 1982 – Audrey Kawasaki, American painter
- 1982 – Chien-Ming Wang, Taiwanese baseball player
- 1983 – Hashim Amla, South African cricketer
- 1983 – Ashleigh Ball, Canadian voice actress and musician
- 1983 – Sophie Hunger, Swiss-German musician
- 1983 – Vlasios Maras, Greek gymnast
- 1983 – Nigel Plum, Australian rugby league player
- 1984 – David Clarkson, Canadian ice hockey player
- 1984 – Eddie Johnson, American soccer player
- 1984 – James Jones, American football player
- 1984 – Martins Dukurs, Latvian sled racer
- 1984 – Kaie Kand, Estonian heptathlete
- 1984 – Alberto Junior Rodríguez, Peruvian footballer
- 1984 – Ed Williamson, English rugby player
- 1985 – Steve Bernier, Canadian ice hockey player
- 1985 – Jo-Lonn Dunbar, American football player
- 1985 – Jesper Hansen, Danish footballer
- 1985 – Ivan Mishyn, Ukrainian race car driver
- 1985 – Kory Sheets, American football player
- 1985 – Jalmar Sjöberg, Swedish wrestler
- 1986 – Andreas Dober, Austrian footballer
- 1986 – James King, Scottish rugby player
- 1986 – Paulo Machado, Portuguese footballer
- 1987 – Nordin Amrabat, Dutch footballer
- 1987 – Hugo Ayala, Mexican footballer
- 1987 – Amaury Bischoff, Portuguese footballer
- 1987 – Humpy Koneru, Indian chess player
- 1987 – Kirill Starkov, Danish ice hockey player
- 1987 – Nelli Zhiganshina, Russian figure skater
- 1988 – Thomas De Corte, Belgian footballer
- 1988 – Conrad Sewell, Australian singer and songwriter
- 1988 – Dorin Dickerson, American football player
- 1988 – DeAndre Liggins, American basketball player
- 1988 – Louis van der Westhuizen, Namibian cricketer
- 1989 – Alberto Martín Romo García Adámez, Spanish footballer
- 1989 – Nejc Vidmar, Slovenian footballer
- 1989 – Liu Zige, Chinese swimmer
- 1990 – George Iloka, American football player
- 1990 – Lyra McKee, Irish journalist (died 2019)
- 1990 – Sandra Roma, Swedish tennis player
- 1991 – Milan Milanović, Serbian footballer
- 1991 – Rodney Sneijder, Dutch footballer
- 1992 – Stijn de Looijer, Dutch footballer
- 1992 – Adam Zampa, Australian cricketer
- 1993 – Mikael Ishak, Swedish footballer
- 1994 – Samira Asghari, Afghan member of the International Olympic Committee
- 1994 – Tyler Wright, Australian surfer
- 1994 – Mads Würtz Schmidt, Danish road cyclist
- 1995 – Fiona Brown, footballer
- 1996 – Liza Koshy, American actress, comedian, and television host
- 1998 – Jakob Chychrun, American-born Canadian ice hockey player
- 1999 – Japhet Tanganga, English footballer
- 1999 – Brooke Scullion, Irish Singer
- 1999 – Jens Odgaard, Danish professional footballer
- 1999 – Denys Strekalin, Ukrainian-born pair skater
- 1999 – Adam Chrzanowski, Polish professional footballer
- 1999 – Santiago Chocobares, Argentine rugby union player
- 1999 – Ballou Tabla, Canadian professional soccer player
- 1999 – Elžbieta Kropa, Lithuanian figure skater
- 1999 – Edon Zhegrova, professional footballer
- 1999 – Shiann Salmon, Jamaican track and field athlete
- 1999 – Ben Williams, Welsh professional footballer
- 1999 – Luca Pizzul, Italian professional footballer
- 1999 – Sander Raieste, Estonian professional basketball player
- 1999 – Jonas Røndbjerg, Danish ice hockey player
- 1999 – Adele Tan, Singaporean sports shooter
- 1999 – Nuno Pina, Portuguese football player
- 1999 – Tereza Jančová, Slovak skier
- 1999 – Maren Lutz, German female canoeist
- 1999 – Shehana Vithana, Sri Lankan-Australian professional squash player
- 1999 – Providence Cowdrill, English cricketer
- 1999 – Ricardo Felipe, Brazilian footballer
- 1999 – Dimitris Dalakouras, Greek professional footballer
- 2004 – Samson Baidoo, Austrian professional footballer
- 2004 – Mateo Sanabria, Argentine professional footballer
- 2004 – Alex Luna, Argentine professional footballer
- 2005 – Reed Baker-Whiting, American professional footballer

== Deaths ==
=== Pre-1600 ===
- 32 BC – Titus Pomponius Atticus, Roman nobleman of the Equestrian order (born 109 BC)
- 528 – Xiaoming, emperor of Northern Wei (born 510)
- 963 – Abu Ja'far Ahmad ibn Muhammad, Saffarid emir (born 906)
- 1241 – Pousa, voivode of Transylvania
- 1251 – William of Modena, Italian bishop and diplomat
- 1340 – Ivan I of Moscow, Russian Grand Duke (born 1288)
- 1342 – Dionigi di Borgo San Sepolcro, Italian Augustinian friar
- 1462 – Isidore II of Constantinople, patriarch of Constantinople
- 1491 – Bonaventura Tornielli, Italian Roman Catholic priest (born 1411)
- 1547 – Francis I, French king (born 1494)
- 1567 – Philip I, Landgrave of Hesse (born 1504)

=== 1601–1900 ===
- 1621 – Philip III, Spanish king (born 1578)
- 1622 – Gonzalo Méndez de Canço, Royal Governor of La Florida (born 1554)
- 1631 – John Donne, English lawyer and poet (born 1572)
- 1671 – Anne Hyde, wife of James II of England (born 1637)
- 1723 – Edward Hyde, 3rd Earl of Clarendon, English soldier and politician, 14th Colonial Governor of New York (born 1661)
- 1727 (NS) – Sir Isaac Newton, English scientist and mathematician (born 1643)
- 1741 – Pieter Burman the Elder, Dutch scholar and author (born 1668)
- 1797 – Olaudah Equiano, Nigerian merchant, author, and activist (born 1745)
- 1837 – John Constable, English painter and educator (born 1776)
- 1850 – John C. Calhoun, American lawyer and politician, 7th Vice President of the United States (born 1782)
- 1855 – Charlotte Brontë, English novelist and poet (born 1816)
- 1877 – Antoine Augustin Cournot, French mathematician and philosopher (born 1801)
- 1880 – Henryk Wieniawski, Polish violinist and composer (born 1835)
- 1885 – Franz Abt, German composer and conductor (born 1819)

=== 1901–present ===
- 1907 – Galusha A. Grow, American lawyer and politician, 28th Speaker of the United States House of Representatives (born 1823)
- 1910 – Jean Moréas, Greek poet, essayist and art critic (born 1856)
- 1913 – J. P. Morgan, American banker and financier (born 1837)
- 1915 – Wyndham Halswelle, English-Scottish runner and captain (born 1882)
- 1917 – Emil von Behring, German physiologist and immunologist, Nobel Prize laureate (born 1854)
- 1920 – Abdul Hamid Madarshahi, Bengali Islamic scholar and author (born 1869)
- 1924 – George Charles Haité, English painter and illustrator (born 1855)
- 1927 – Kang Youwei, Chinese scholar and political reformer (born 1858)
- 1930 – Ludwig Schüler, German politician, Mayor of Marburg (born 1836)
- 1931 – Knute Rockne, American football player and coach (born 1888)
- 1935 – Georges V. Matchabelli, Georgian-American businessman and diplomat, founded Prince Matchabelli perfume (born 1885)
- 1939 – Ioannis Tsangaridis, Greek general (born 1887)
- 1944 – Mineichi Koga, Japanese admiral (born 1885)
- 1945 – Frank Findlay, New Zealand banker and politician (born 1884)
- 1945 – Hans Fischer, German chemist and academic, Nobel Prize laureate (born 1881)
- 1950 – Robert Natus, Estonian architect (born 1890)
- 1952 – Wallace H. White, Jr., American lawyer and politician (born 1877)
- 1956 – Ralph DePalma, Italian-American race car driver and actor (born 1884)
- 1956 – Nellah Massey Bailey, American politician and librarian (born 1893)
- 1961 – Pyrros Spyromilios, officer of the Greek Navy and director of the Greek Radio Orchestra (born 1913)
- 1968 – Grover Lowdermilk, American baseball player (born 1885)
- 1970 – Semyon Timoshenko, Soviet Commander during the Winter War and the Eastern Front of World War II (born 1894)
- 1975 – Percy Alliss, English golfer (born 1897)
- 1976 – Paul Strand, American photographer and director (born 1890)
- 1978 – Astrid Allwyn, American actress (born 1905)
- 1978 – Charles Best, American-Canadian physiologist and biochemist, co-discovered Insulin (born 1899)
- 1980 – Vladimír Holan, Czech poet and author (born 1905)
- 1980 – Jesse Owens, American sprinter and long jumper (born 1913)
- 1981 – Enid Bagnold, English author and playwright (born 1889)
- 1983 – Christina Stead, Australian author and academic (born 1902)
- 1986 – Jerry Paris, American actor and director (born 1925)
- 1988 – William McMahon, Australian lawyer and politician, 20th Prime Minister of Australia (born 1908)
- 1991 – Theofylaktos Papakonstantinou, Greek columnist, political and social analyst and historian (born 1905)
- 1993 – Brandon Lee, American actor and martial artist (born 1965)
- 1993 – Mitchell Parish, Lithuanian-American songwriter (born 1900)
- 1995 – Selena, American singer-songwriter (born 1971)
- 1996 – Dante Giacosa, Italian automobile designer and engineer (born 1905)
- 1996 – Jeffrey Lee Pierce, American singer-songwriter and guitarist (born 1958)
- 1997 – Stephen Kalong Ningkan, first Chief Minister of Sarawak, Malaysia.
- 1998 – Bella Abzug, American lawyer, activist, and politician (born 1920)
- 1998 – Tim Flock, American race car driver (born 1924)
- 1998 – Joel Ryce-Menuhin, American pianist (born 1933)
- 1999 – Yuri Knorozov, Russian linguist and ethnographer (born 1922)
- 2000 – Gisèle Freund, German-born French photographer and photojournalist (born 1908)
- 2000 – Adrian Fisher, English guitarist and member of the band Toby (born 1952)
- 2001 – David Rocastle, English footballer (born 1967)
- 2001 – Clifford Shull, American physicist and academic, Nobel Prize laureate (born 1915)
- 2002 – Barry Took, English comedian, actor, and screenwriter (born 1928)
- 2002 – Moturu Udayam, Indian activist and politician (born 1924)
- 2002 – Carlos J. Gradin, Argentine Archaeologist (born 1913)
- 2003 – Harold Scott MacDonald Coxeter, English-Canadian mathematician and academic (born 1907)
- 2003 – Anne Gwynne, American actress (born 1918)
- 2003 – Tommy Seebach, Danish singer-songwriter, pianist, and producer (born 1949)
- 2004 – Scott Helvenston, American soldier (born 1965)
- 2005 – Stanley J. Korsmeyer, American oncologist and academic (born 1951)
- 2005 – Justiniano Montano, Filipino lawyer and politician (born 1905)
- 2005 – Frank Perdue, American businessman (born 1920)
- 2006 – Jackie McLean, American saxophonist and composer (born 1931)
- 2007 – Paul Watzlawick, Austrian-American psychologist and philosopher (born 1921)
- 2008 – Jules Dassin, American director, producer, screenwriter, and actor (born 1911)
- 2008 – Bill Keightley, American equipment manager (born 1926)
- 2009 – Raúl Alfonsín, Argentinian lawyer and politician, 46th President of Argentina (born 1927)
- 2009 – Choor Singh, Indian-Singaporean lawyer and judge (born 1911)
- 2010 – Jerald terHorst, American journalist (born 1922)
- 2010 – Roger Addison, Welsh rugby union player (born 1945)
- 2011 – Gil Clancy, American boxer and trainer (born 1922)
- 2011 – Alan Fitzgerald, Australian journalist and author (born 1935)
- 2011 – Mary Greyeyes, the first First Nations woman to join the Canadian Armed Forces (born 1920)
- 2011 – Oddvar Hansen, Norwegian footballer and coach (born 1921)
- 2011 – Ishbel MacAskill, Scottish singer and actress (born 1941)
- 2011 – Henry Taub, American businessman and philanthropist (born 1927)
- 2012 – Judith Adams, New Zealand-Australian nurse and politician (born 1943)
- 2012 – Dale R. Corson, American physicist and academic (born 1914)
- 2012 – Bernard O. Gruenke, American stained glass artist (born 1914)
- 2012 – Jerry Lynch, American baseball player (born 1930)
- 2012 – Alberto Sughi, Italian painter (born 1928)
- 2012 – Halbert White, American economist and academic (born 1950)
- 2013 – Charles Amarin Brand, French archbishop (born 1920)
- 2013 – Ernie Bridge, Australian singer and politician (born 1936)
- 2013 – Bob Clarke, American illustrator (born 1926)
- 2013 – Ahmad Sayyed Javadi, Iranian lawyer and politician, Iranian Minister of Interior (born 1917)
- 2013 – Dmitri Uchaykin, Russian ice hockey player (born 1980)
- 2014 – Gonzalo Anes, Spanish economist, historian, and academic (born 1931)
- 2014 – Roger Somville, Belgian painter (born 1923)
- 2015 – Betty Churcher, Australian painter, historian, and curator (born 1931)
- 2015 – Cocoa Fujiwara, Japanese author and illustrator (born 1983)
- 2015 – Carlos Gaviria Díaz, Colombian lawyer and politician (born 1937)
- 2015 – Dalibor Vesely, Czech-English historian, author, and academic (born 1934)
- 2016 – Ronnie Corbett, Scottish comedian, actor and screenwriter (born 1930)
- 2016 – Hans-Dietrich Genscher, German politician (born 1927)
- 2016 – Zaha Hadid, Iraqi-born English architect and academic, designed the Bridge Pavilion (born 1950)
- 2016 – Imre Kertész, Hungarian author, Nobel Prize laureate (born 1929)
- 2016 – Denise Robertson, British writer and television broadcaster (born 1932)
- 2017 – Gilbert Baker, American artist and LGBT rights activist (born 1951)
- 2017 – James Rosenquist, American artist (born 1933)
- 2018 – Nick Newton, inventor of the Newton Starting Blocks (born 1933)
- 2019 – Nipsey Hussle, American rapper (born 1985)
- 2020 – Gita Ramjee, Ugandan-South African scientist and researcher (born 1956)
- 2021 – Ken Reitz, American baseball player (born 1951)
- 2021 – Muhammad Wakkas, Bangladeshi teacher and parliamentarian (born 1952)
- 2022 – Shirley Burkovich, former American All-American Girls Professional Baseball League (AAGPBL) player (born 1933)
- 2022 – Patrick Demarchelier, French fashion photographer (born 1943)
- 2022 – Moana Jackson, New Zealand lawyer specialising in constitutional law (born 1945)
- 2022 – Tullio Moneta, Italian mercenary and actor (born 1937)
- 2024 – Barbara Rush, American actress (born 1927)
- 2025 – Sian Barbara Allen, American television actress (born 1946)
- 2025 – Betty Webb, English code breaker (born 1923)
- 2026 – Stephen Lewis, Canadian politician and diplomat, 14th Canadian Ambassador to the United Nations (born 1937)

== Holidays and observances ==
- Cesar Chavez Day (California, Washington (state))
- Christian feast day
  - Abdas of Susa
  - Acathius of Melitene (Eastern Orthodox Church)
  - Anesius and companions
  - Benjamin
  - Balbina
  - John Donne (Anglican Communion, Lutheran)
  - Natalia Tułasiewicz
  - March 31 (Eastern Orthodox liturgics)
- Freedom Day (Malta)
- International Transgender Day of Visibility
- King Nangklao Memorial Day (Thailand)
- Thomas Mundy Peterson Day (New Jersey, United States)
- Transfer Day (US Virgin Islands)
- World Backup Day
