= African Convention =

Political party in French West Africa (1957–58)

African Convention Convention Africaine
- President: Léopold Sédar Senghor
- General Secretary: Alexandre Adandé
- Founded: 11 January 1957
- Dissolved: 26 March 1958
- Merged into: PRA

African Convention (French: Convention Africaine, CA) was a political party in French West Africa, originally formed at a meeting in Dakar on 11 January 1957. The CA consisted of the Senegalese Popular Bloc (BPS) of Léopold Sédar Senghor, the African Popular Movement of Nazi Boni in Upper Volta, and the Nigerien Democratic Front (FDN) of Zodi Ikhia in Niger.

In the 1957 territorial assembly elections, CA member parties won 96 seats. CA won in Senegal, and gained presence in three other assemblies.

In March 1958 the African Convention and the African Socialist Movement (MSA) merged to form the African Regroupment Party (PRA).

== History ==
The founding congress of the African Convention, convened by Léopold Sédar Senghor, took place from January 11 to 13, 1957 in Dakar, the capital of French West Africa. The congress was attended by members of the Indépendants d'Outre-Mer, a parliamentary group in the French National Assembly. Senegalese MP Senghor was party president. Alexandre Adandé from Dahomey was appointed General Secretary of the party.

The African Convention aims to create two federations in the French territories of Africa, which are to be member states of a federally organized French republic. Like the Mouvement Socialiste Africain (MSA), founded at the same time, and the former Rassemblement Démocratique Africain (RDA), the Convention Africaine was organized on an inter-territorial basis, with several member parties in French overseas territories in West Africa.
