= Sangoulé Lamizana =

President of Upper Volta from 1966 to 1980

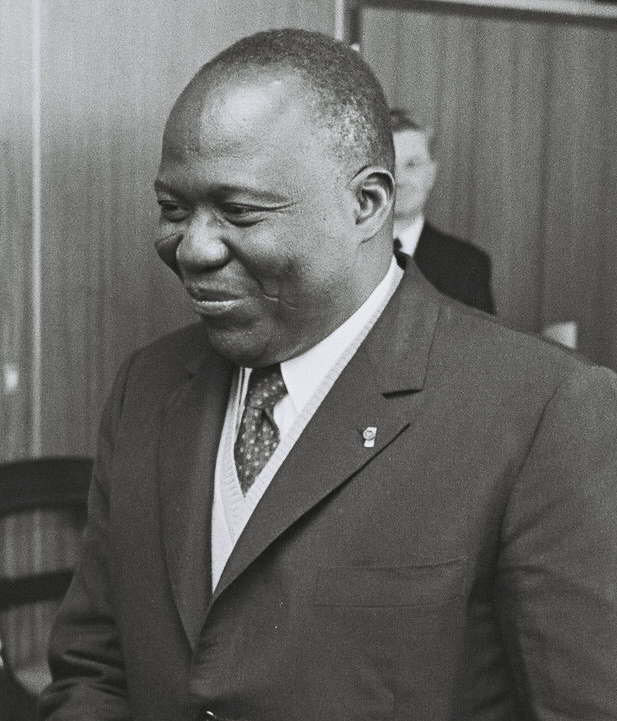
- Lamizana in 1971

2nd President of Upper Volta
- In office 3 January 1966 – 25 November 1980
- Prime Minister: Gérard Kango Ouédraogo; Himself; Joseph Conombo; Saye Zerbo
- Preceded by: Maurice Yaméogo
- Succeeded by: Saye Zerbo

2nd Prime Minister of Upper Volta
- In office 8 February 1974 – 7 July 1978
- President: Himself
- Preceded by: Gérard Kango Ouédraogo
- Succeeded by: Joseph Conombo

Personal details
- Born: 31 January 1916 Dianra, French Upper Volta
- Died: 26 May 2005 (aged 89) Ouagadougou, Burkina Faso
- Party: Independent
- Children: Mariam Lamizana
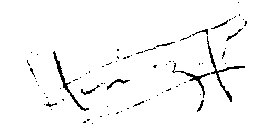
- Signature

Aboubacar Sangoulé Lamizana (31 January 1916 – 26 May 2005) was an Upper Voltan military officer who served as the President of Upper Volta (since 1984 renamed Burkina Faso), in power from 3 January 1966, to 25 November 1980. He held the additional position of Prime Minister from 8 February 1974, to 7 July 1978.

== Biography ==
After Upper Volta achieved complete independence from the French Union in 1960, opposition parties either merged with the governing party, Union démocratique voltaïque (UDV), or were banned, transforming Upper Volta into a single party state, headed by Maurice Yaméogo as President. Yaméogo's one-party regime elicited much unrest; student strikes and mass demonstrations by students, labor unions, and civil servants. Yaméogo was forced to resign after a general strike and a military coup on 3 January 1966, giving power to General Sangoulé Lamizana on the demonstrators' demand.

Lamizana served as nominal head of a "provisional military government" until a new Constitution, ratified on 14 June 1970, provided for a four-year transition to fully civilian elected leadership; he was also foreign minister from 1966 to 1967. Elections under the new Constitution delivered a clear majority of the assembly to the UDV.

In the early 1970s the effect of a five-year drought and increasing desertification in the Sahel brought the threat of famine to several nations including Upper Volta. The resulting economic dislocation encouraged factionalism in the government, headed by Gérard Kango Ouédraogo, the prime minister who had been appointed by Lamizana. Again military intervention and dissolution of the assembly brought Lamizana back in control, essentially now as dictator.

Lamizana's regime had international recognition and visited with U.S. President Richard Nixon. On 15 October 1973 Lamizana met with President Nixon and briefed him on the Sahel drought in the Oval Office. Lamizana explained that he represented himself and the other Sahel governments and hoped to secure aid during the famine and drought. Nixon promised to provide as much help as he could.

His personal party following was styled the National Movement for Renewal, although that became a short-lived formation. A new Constitution was written and approved in a referendum in 1977, and Lamizana was reelected in open elections in 1978; this election is generally considered as being among the most democratic ever held in West Africa. Reportedly, Lamizana supported corporatism.

With the support of unions and civil groups, Col. Saye Zerbo overthrew Lamizana in a bloodless military coup in November 1980.

== See also ==
- 1966 Upper Voltan coup d'état

Political offices
Preceded by Maurice Yaméogo	President of Upper Volta; 1966–1980	Succeeded by Saye Zerbo
Preceded by Gérard Kango Ouédraogo	Prime Minister of Upper Volta; 1974–1978	Succeeded by Joseph Conombo
