= Henri Guissou =

Burkinabé politician (1910–1979)

Henri Guissou (17 November 1910, Koudougou, French Upper Volta – 22 May 1979, Koudougou) was a Burkinabé politician and diplomat. He served in numerous diplomatic roles, including as a member of the National Assembly of France and the French Senate. In 1955 he helped found the Social Party for the Emancipation of the African Masses (PSEMA), which became the Unified Democratic Party. Afterward, he represented the Republic of Upper Volta at the United Nations, to France, and to West Germany.

== Early life ==
Guissou was born on 17 November 1910 in Koudougou. Guissou was the first student from Burkina Faso to pass the entrance exam for École normale supérieure William Ponty, where he graduated from. Afterward, from 1936, he served as a service accountant in Côte d'Ivoire until he was elected as senator in 1947.

== Career ==
Henri Guissou was a senator from Côte d'Ivoire from 1947 to 1948, and as a member for French Upper Volta to the National Assembly of France from 1949 to 1959, Guissou also served in the French Senate from 1947 to 1948. From 1948 to 1952 he was member for Koudougou of the Territorial Assembly of French Upper Volta. A political leader of the Voltaic Union, he founded the Social Party for the Emancipation of the African Masses (PSEMA) with Joseph Conombo in 1955, which joined the Unified Democratic Party (PDU) in the following year. He became a diplomat for the new Republic of Upper Volta: after briefly representing Upper Volta at the United Nations from February to May 1961, he was Ambassador to France from 1961 to 1964, Ambassador to West Germany from 1966 to 1976, and Ambassador to France from 1966 until his retirement in 1976.

He was the father of Joséphine Ouédraogo, a Burkinabé female politician who served as a minister during the presidency of Thomas Sankara and Michel Kafando.
