= 1957 Upper Voltan Territorial Assembly election =

Territorial Assembly elections were held in French Upper Volta on 31 March 1957. The result was a victory for the Unified Democratic Party (an alliance of the Voltaic Democratic Union–African Democratic Rally and the Social Party for the Emancipation of the African Masses), which won 33 of the 68 seats in the Assembly.

== Results ==
Party	Votes	%	Seats
Unified Democratic Party	538,876	55.55	33
Voltaic Democratic Movement	226,593	23.36	24
Entente Fada N'Gourma	98,301	10.13	5
African Popular Movement	79,743	8.22	5
Other parties	12,392	1.28	1
Independents	14,162	1.46	2
Total	970,067	100.00	70
Valid votes	970,067	98.47	
Invalid/blank votes	15,117	1.53	
Total votes	985,184	100.00	
Registered voters/turnout	1,902,668	51.78	
Source: Sternberger et al.
