= African Popular Movement =

Political party in Upper Volta

African Popular Movement Mouvement Populaire Africain
- Founder: Nazi Boni
- Founded: 1955
- Split from: Voltaic Union
- National affiliation: SV
- Continental affiliation: CA (1957–58); PRA (from 1958)

The African Popular Movement (in French: Mouvement Populaire Africain) was a political party in Upper Volta, led by Nazi Boni. MPA was founded in 1955 following a split in the Voltaic Union. The party sought to be a Voltaic affiliate of the Mouvement populaire d'émancipation africaine (MPEA), a pan-African intercontinental party founded by Diongolo Traoré a year earlier.

In the 1957 Territorial Assembly elections MPA won five seats. After the elections MPA joined the Voltaic Solidarity (SV) grouping.

In 1957 MPA joined the African Convention of Léopold Sédar Senghor.

In 1958 MPA, along with the rest of CA, merged into the African Regroupment Party (PRA).
