= Voltaic Solidarity =

Voltaic Solidarity Solidarité Voltaïque
- Abbreviation: SV
- Founded: 1957
- Dissolved: c. 1960
- Merger of: PSEMA; MPA; MDV
- Regional affiliation: PRA

Voltaic Solidarity (in French: Solidarité voltaïque) was a political alliance in Upper Volta formed after the territorial elections in 1957 (69 years ago). SV was constituted by the Social Party for the Emancipation of the African Masses (PSEMA), African Popular Movement (MPA) and the Voltaic Democratic Movement (MDV). SV demanded the resignation of the vice-president of the territory, Ouezzin Coulibaly. A motion of no-confidence was called for, but four SV deputes sided with the government and the motion was defeated. One of those four deputies was Maurice Yaméogo, who joined the African Democratic Rally.

In 1958 SV joined the African Regroupment Party.
