= National Liberation Committee of Ivory Coast =

The National Liberation Committee of Ivory Coast (French: Comité National de Libération de la Côte d'Ivoire, CNLCI) was an Ivorian opposition group, with its political origins in the African Regroupment Party (PRA). CNLCI was founded in Conakry on May 18, 1959 by a group of Ivorian exiles. CNLCI promoted the formation of a 'United States of Africa'.

== Sources ==
- Gbagbo, Laurent: Côte d'Ivoire, Pour une alternative démocratique. Paris: L'Harmattan, 1983.
