= Entente Fada N'Gourma =

Defunct political party in Burkina Faso

Entente Fada N'Gourma was a political party in the Fada N'gourma area of Burkina Faso.

== History ==
The party received 10.1% of the vote in the 1957 Territorial Assembly elections, winning five seats.
