= Édouard Hesling =

Governor of French Upper Volta

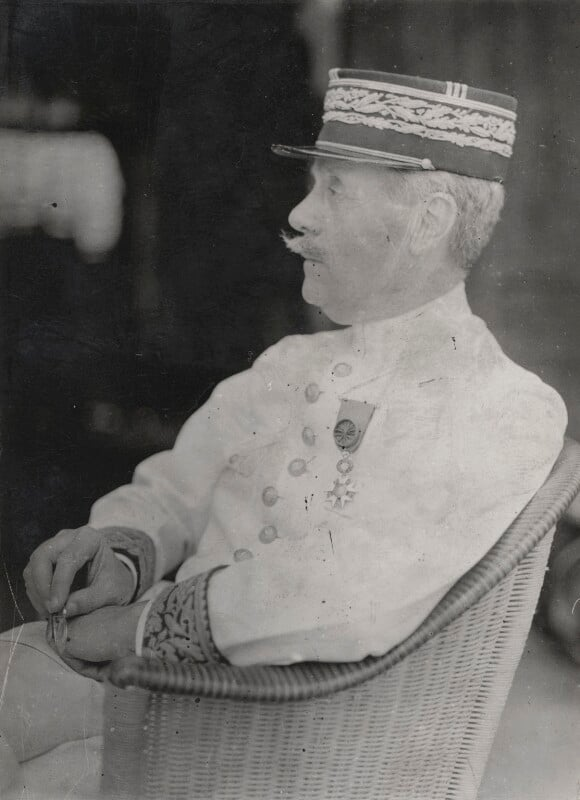
Hesling, 1919–1927

Frederick Charles Édouard Alexis Hesling (1869–1934) was the first governor of French Upper Volta, a post he held from 1919 to 1927.
