= Voltaic Regroupment Movement =

The Voltaic Regroupment Movement (French: Mouvement de Regroupement Voltaïque), was a political party in Upper Volta. It contested the 1970 elections.
