= Diongolo Traore =

Burkinabe politician

Member of the French Senate
- In office 1952–1958

Personal details
- Born: 1914 Bobo-Dioulasso
- Died: April 18, 1971 (aged 56–57) Ouagadougou

Diongolo Traore (born 1914 in Bobo-Dioulasso, Burkina Faso, died April 18, 1971) was a Burkinabe politician who served in the French Senate from 1952–1958.
