= Gérard Kango Ouédraogo =

Burkinabé statesman and diplomat

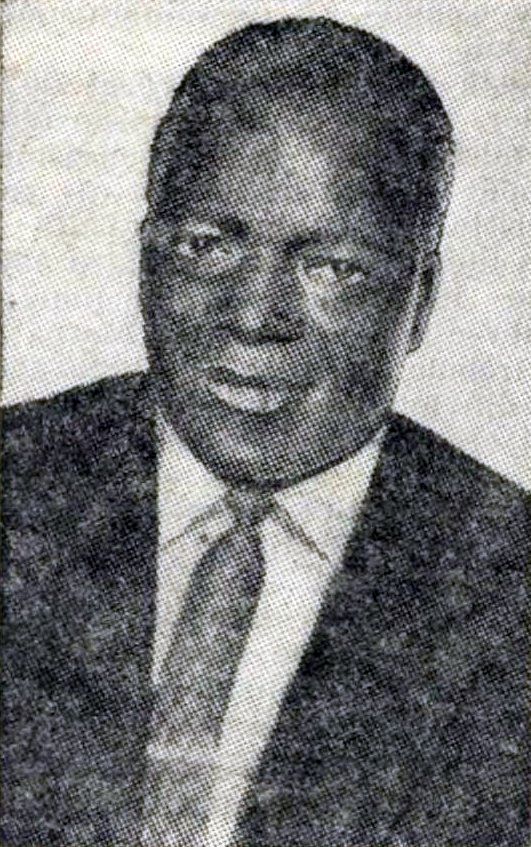
- Ouédraogo, c. 1971

Prime Minister of Upper Volta
- In office 13 February 1971 – 8 February 1974
- Succeeded by: Sangoulé Lamizana

Personal details
- Born: 19 September 1925 Ouahigouya, Burkina Faso
- Died: 1 July 2014 (aged 88) Ouagadougou, Burkina Faso

Gérard Kango Ouédraogo (French pronunciation: [ʒeʁaʁ kɑ̃ɡo wedʁaɔɡo]; 19 September 1925 – 1 July 2014) was a Burkinabé statesman and diplomat who served as Prime Minister of Upper Volta (now Burkina Faso) from 13 February 1971 to 8 February 1974. He was subsequently President of the National Assembly of Upper Volta from October 1978 to 25 November 1980.

== Overview ==
Gérard Ouédraogo was born in Ouahigouya, Burkina Faso. He served in the French National Assembly from 1956 to 1959. In May 1998, he was the Honorary President for Life of the Alliance for Democracy and Federation–African Democratic Rally (ADF/ADR), which is led by his son, Gilbert Noël Ouédraogo. Ouédraogo died on 1 July 2014, at the age of 88.

== Biography ==
Gérard Ouédraogo was born on 19 September 1925, in Naba Kango Cave, Ouahigouya, Burkina Faso.The name Kango originally came from Kaongo, meaning "the field that surrounds a palace or a concession." He was a student of the Terrason de Fougères Modern School on Bamako.

Subsequently, he continued to play an important role in the political life of the country, notably by sitting in the National Assembly for the constituency of Ouahigouya and being one of the leaders of the Voltaic Democratic Union (VDU), member of the African Democratic Rally. He was the Prime Minister of Upper Volta from 1971 to 1974, under the presidency of Sangoulé Lamizana.

The political route of Ouédraogo began on 2 January 1956 with him in an election as a member of the Palais Bourbon in Paris, under the banner of the Progressive Voltaic Party (PPV), resulting from the termination of the Voltaic Democratic Union which until then had a quasi-monopoly on the political scene of the country. He was also the vice-president of the Grand Council of French West Africa in Dakar, then Minister of Finance from 1958 to 1959. Afterwards, he had accumulated the positions: Director of African and Malagasy Affairs, representative of UNHCR (United Nations High Commissioner for Refugees) in the Upper Volta and Chairman of the Political and Administrative Affairs Committee of the Territorial Assembly of Upper Volta. He became the first ambassador of the independent Upper Volta in Britain on 1960 to 1966. Continued his ascension to become Prime Minister of Upper Volta from 1971 to 1974 under the presidency of Sangoulé Lamizana, his party, Voltaic Democratic Union (VDU) and African Democratic Rally triumphed without a shot in the legislative consultations of 20 December 1970 by winning 37 deputies. He was the president of the National Assembly of Upper Volta from 1978 until 1980.

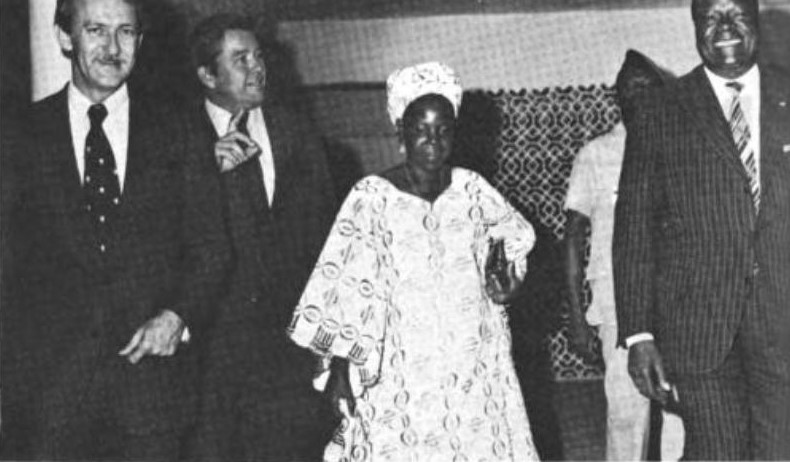
Ouédraogo (far right) with his wife and American diplomats, 1980

Ouédraogo was the founding president of several political movements, including the Mouvement de regroupement voltaïque (VRM). As one of the leaders of the Voltaic Democratic Union and African Democratic Rally, and a member of the African Democratic Rally (ADR), he had become a member of the Upper Volta in the Fourth Republic, and in the first National Assembly of the Fifth Republic. He was the ambassador of the new independent state of Upper Volta in Britain from 1960 to 1966. The honorary president of the parties was also a city councilor of the city of Ouagadougou, Burkina Faso.

In favor of the 1991 democratic opening of Burkina Faso, Gérard Kango Ouédraogo was elected deputy in May 1992 and reelected in May 1997. On 23 September 1997, he resigned voluntarily from the National Assembly. One of the founding fathers of the African Democratic Rally in Upper Volta was named Honorary President during the merger of the Alliance for Democracy and Federation and the African Democratic Rally. After all of his achievements, he retired from political life.

While seated as the President of the National Assembly during the coup d'état of Saye Zerbo on 25 November 1980, he was imprisoned several times under the dictatorships of Saye Zerbo, Thomas Sankara and Blaise Compaoré. Since the easing of the regime, headed by the head of state in the early 1990s, he was elected twice under the Fourth Republic, and resigned on 27 May 1998. He died on 1 July 2014 in Ouagadougou, Burkina Faso at the age of 88.
