= Social Party for the Emancipation of the African Masses =

Political party in Upper Volta

Social Party for the Emancipation of the African Masses Parti Social pour l'Émancipation des Masses Africaines
- Abbreviation: PSEMA
- Leader: Joseph Conombo; Henri Guissou
- Founded: 1955
- Split from: Voltaic Union
- National affiliation: SV
- Continental affiliation: PRA

Social Party for the Emancipation of the African Masses (in French: Parti Social pour l'Émancipation des Masses Africaines) was a political party in Upper Volta, led by Joseph Conombo and Henri Guissou. PSEMA was founded in 1955 following a split in the Voltaic Union.

Ahead of the 1957 territorial assembly elections, PSEMA joined the Unified Democratic Party (PDU) coalition, which won the elections. PSEMA candidates did, however, not fare too well. After the elections PSEMA split from PDU and joined the Voltaic Solidarity (SV) grouping. Effectively it lost government power.

In 1958 PSEMA, along with the rest of SV, merged into the African Regroupment Party (PRA).

== Source ==
- Englebert, Pierre (1986). La révolution burkinabè. Collection "Points de vue". Paris: L'Harmattan. ISBN 978-2-85802-756-9.
