= Dimitrios Dalakouras =

Greek footballer (born 1999)

Personal information
- Date of birth: 31 March 1999 (age 27)
- Place of birth: Agrinio, Greece
- Height: 1.76 m (5 ft 9 in)
- Position: Midfielder

Team information
- Current team: Karaiskakis
- Number: 16

Youth career
- 2009–2018: Panetolikos

Senior career*
Years	Team	Apps	(Gls)
2018–2021	Panetolikos	1	(0)
2019–2021	→ Karaiskakis (loan)	21	(0)
2021–2022	Panionios		
2022–	Karaiskakis	19	(0)

International career^{‡}
2017	Greece U18	5	(1)
2017–2018	Greece U19	7	(1)
- * Club domestic league appearances and goals as of 27 April 2022 ‡ National team caps and goals as of 22 February 2018

Dimitrios Dalakouras (Greek: Δημήτριος Νταλακούρας; born 31 March 1999) is a Greek professional footballer who plays as a midfielder for Panionios.

== Career ==
=== Panetolikos ===
Dalakouras began his career with the youth club of Panetolikos.

He made his Super League debut on 3 February 2018 in a match against Panathinaikos.
