= African Regroupment Party =

Political party in the French African colonies

African Regroupment Party Parti du Regroupement Africain
- Abbreviation: PRA
- Founded: 26 March 1958
- Dissolved: 1960s
- Merger of: CA; MSA
- Succeeded by: PFA
- Ideology: Anti-colonialism; Pan-africanism; African socialism Marxism; Democratic socialism Anti-RDA
- Political position: Left-wing

The African Regroupment Party (French: Parti du Regroupement Africain, PRA) was a political party in the French African colonies.

== Formation ==
The PRA came into being at a meeting in Paris on 26 March 1958, months before the French Community would replace the French Union. The main founding organizations were the African Convention and the African Socialist Movement. Other parties that assisted the Paris meeting included the African Bloc of Guinea, Social Party of the Masses (Gabon), Republican Union of Côte des Somalis (Djibouti), Dahomeyan Democratic Rally and the Voltaic Democratic Movement.

Initially there was hope that the African Democratic Rally (RDA) would join the project and Sékou Touré had signed the appeal on behalf of RDA calling for the formation of the party, but Félix Houphouët-Boigny intervened to keep his party outside. The African Independence Party (PAI) attended the Paris meeting, but declined to merge into PRA. PAI advocated full independence, a demand that PRA at that point was not willing to raise.

PRA held its constitutive congress in Cotonou from 25 to 27 July 1958. PRA strove to create an independent federation out of the French colonies in Africa.

== 1958 referendum and aftermath ==
During the referendum of 1958 PRA advocated full independence. This led to a collision course between PRA and its Senegalese section, the Senegalese Progressive Union (UPS). The result was a split in the UPS, and the formation of African Regroupment Party-Senegal (PRA-Sénégal).

In Côte d'Ivoire the party came into conflict with the Democratic Party of Côte d'Ivoire (PDCI), and the PRA leadership was exiled to Conakry. There it became the nucleus of Ivorian opposition, such as the National Liberation Committee of Côte d'Ivoire (CNLCI).

In Upper Volta the Voltaic Solidarity group (PSEMA, MDV and MPA) joined PRA. The PRA section disappeared as the country became a single-party state in 1960, but the African Regroupment Party of Upper Volta, a group claiming to be the inheritors of PRA, emerged following the coup in 1966.
