= Voltaic Democratic Movement =

Voltaic Democratic Movement Mouvement démocratique voltaïque
- Leader: Gérard Kango Ouédraogo
- Founded: 1955
- Dissolved: 1958
- Merged into: African Regroupment Party

The Voltaic Democratic Movement (in French: Mouvement Démocratique Voltaïque) was a political party in Upper Volta, led by Gérard Kango Ouédraogo. MDV was founded in 1955.

In the 1957 territorial assembly elections MDV came second with 26 seats. After the elections it formed a government together with the Unified Democratic Party. That government didn't last though, and MDV joined the Voltaic Solidarity (SV) grouping instead. Thus it lost government power.

In 1958 MDV, along with the rest of SV, merged into the African Regroupment Party (PRA).
