= Unified Democratic Party =

Electoral alliance of political parties in Burkina Faso (1957)

Unified Democratic Party (French: Parti Démocratique Unifié), was, despite its name, not a political party but an electoral alliance of two parties, the Voltaic Democratic Party (PDV-RDA) and the Social Party for the Emancipation of the African Masses (PSEMA), ahead of the 1957 territorial assembly elections in Upper Volta. PDU won 33 out of 70 seats.

After the elections PDU formed a government together with the Voltaic Democratic Movement (MDV). PDU held seven ministries and MDV five. The unity proved short-lived. PSEMA and MDV revolted against the vice-president Ouezzine Coulibaly and formed an opposition bloc, Voltaic Solidarity. Thus PDU was no more.

== Sources ==
- Englebert, Pierre. La Revolution Burkinabè. Paris: L'Harmattan, 1986.
