= Joseph Conombo =

Burkinabé politician (1917–2008)

Prime Minister of Upper Volta
- In office 7 July 1978 – 25 November 1980
- President: Sangoulé Lamizana
- Preceded by: Sangoulé Lamizana
- Succeeded by: Saye Zerbo

Personal details
- Born: Joseph Issoufou Conombo; 9 February 1917 Kombissiri Department, Upper Volta
- Died: 20 December 2008 (aged 91)

Joseph Issoufou Conombo (9 February 1917 – 20 December 2008) served as Prime Minister of Upper Volta (now Burkina Faso) from 7 July 1978 to 25 November 1980. Born in the department of Kombissiri, he attended medical school in Dakar, Senegal, then served in the French forces during World War II.

In 1951, Conombo was elected to the French National Assembly, a position he held until Upper Volta gained independence in 1959, even serving as undersecretary of state (1954–1955) in the government of Pierre Mendès France. He served as mayor of Ouagadougou from 1961 to 1965. As a doctor, he was director general for public health (1966–1968), and minister of foreign affairs (1971–1973). He served as prime minister until the military coup led by Saye Zerbo that overthrew the government of President Sangoulé Lamizana. Conombo died on 20 December 2008 at the age of 91.

== Biography ==
Born on 9 February 1917 in Tampinko in a farming family, he studied medicine and obtained his doctor's degree in Dakar in 1942. Senegalese firefighter during the Second World War, Joseph Conombo was elected in 1948 advisor to the French Union, then MP for Upper Volta (1951–1958). He then became Secretary of State for the Interior of the Pierre Mendès France Government (from 4 September 1954 to 20 January 1955).

From the independence of Upper Volta (Burkina Faso from 1984), acquired in 1960, Joseph Conombo becomes successively:

first vice-president of the Voltaic National Assembly (1961), mayor of Ouagadougou (1961–1965) capital of the country, Member of Parliament(1970–) and Minister of Foreign Affairs (1971–1974). His career finally culminates with his accession to the post of Prime Minister of Upper Volta (from 7 July 1978 to 25 November 1980). Following a military coup, he was imprisoned for four years and released in 1985. He is the source of the twinning of the municipality of Illfurth in Alsace and Kombissiri in Burkina Faso.
