= French Upper Volta =

French colony in West Africa (1919-1958); now Burkina Faso

Upper Volta Haute-Volta
- Constituent of French West Africa
- 1919–1932 1947–1958
- Flag

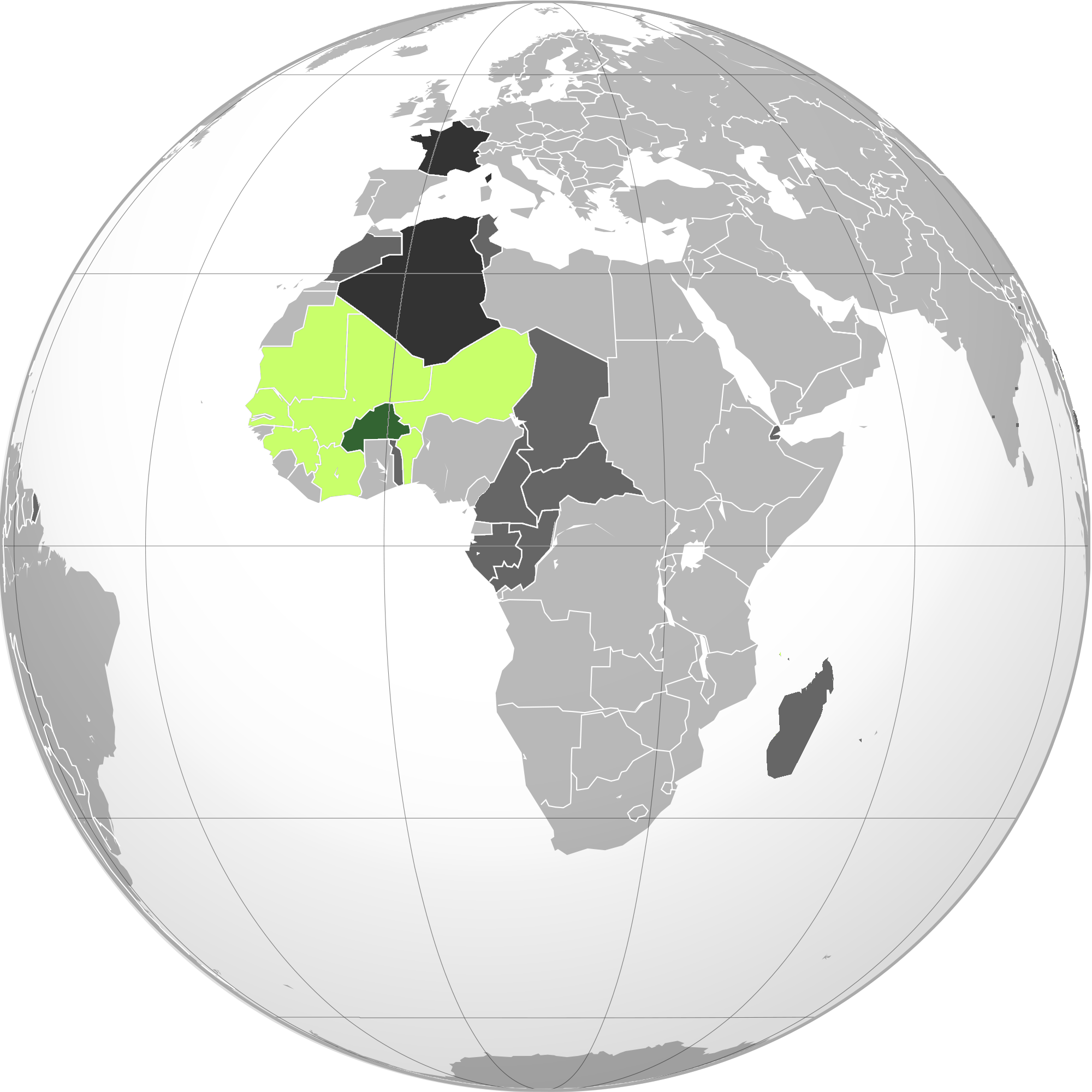
- Dark green: French Upper Volta; Light green: French West Africa; Dark gray: Other French possessions Darkest gray: French Republic

Anthem
- La Marseillaise
- Capital: Ouagadougou
- Demonym: Upper Voltese
- Government
- Governor
  - 1948–1953: Albert Mouragues
  - 1957–1958: Yvon Bourges
  - 1958: Max Berthet (acting)
- Premier^{a}
  - 1957–1958: Daniel Ouezzin Coulibaly
  - 1958: Maurice Yaméogo
- Historical era: Interwar · Cold War
  - Established: 1 March 1919
  - Abolished: 5 September 1932
  - Reestablished: 4 September 1947
  - Autonomy: 11 December 1958
  - Independence: 5 August 1960
Preceded by
Upper Senegal and Niger
Côte d'Ivoire
Succeeded by
French Sudan
Colony of Niger
Republic of Upper Volta
- Today part of: Burkina Faso
- a. President of the Government Council.

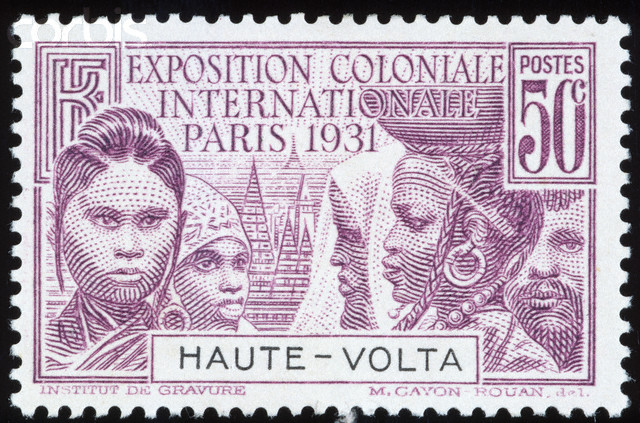
Upper Volta stamp of 1931, marking the Paris Colonial Exhibition

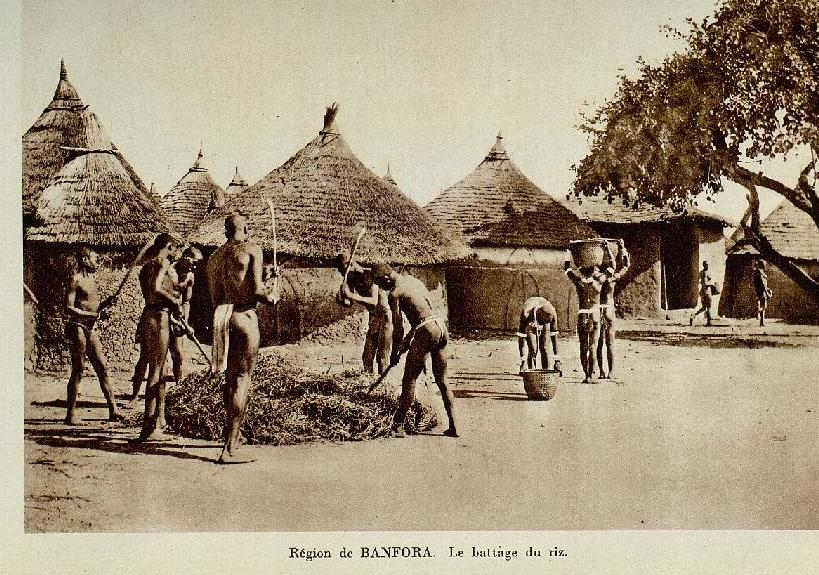
Threshing African rice in Banfora Department, 1931

Upper Volta (French: Haute-Volta) was a colony of French West Africa established in 1919 in the territory occupied by present-day Burkina Faso. It was formed from territories that had been part of the colonies of Upper Senegal and Niger and the Côte d'Ivoire. The colony was dissolved on 5 September 1932, with parts being administered by the Côte d'Ivoire, French Sudan and the Colony of Niger.

After World War II, on 4 September 1947, the colony was revived as a part of the French Union, with its previous boundaries. On 11 December 1958, it was reconstituted as the self-governing Republic of Upper Volta within the French Community, and two years later on 5 August 1960, it attained full independence. On 4 August 1984, the name was changed to Burkina Faso.

The name Upper Volta indicates that the country contains the upper part of the Volta River. The river is divided into three parts, called the Black Volta, White Volta and Red Volta.

== History ==
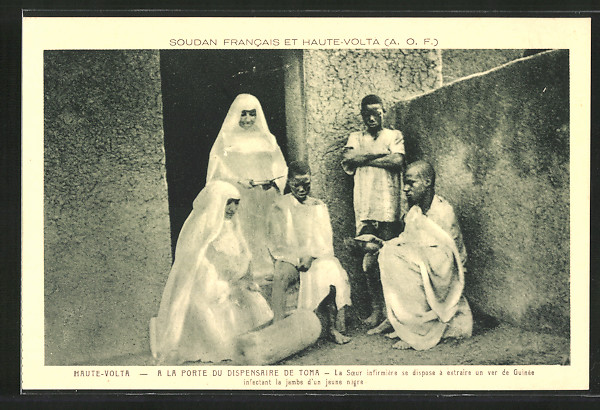
Missionary Sisters of Our Lady of Africa at a dispensary in Toma, 1920s

Until the end of the 19th century, the history of Upper Volta was dominated by the empire-building Mossi/Mossi Kingdoms, who are believed to have come up to their present location from present-day northern Ghana. For centuries, the Mossi peasant was both farmer and soldier, and the Mossi people were able to defend their religious beliefs and social structure against forcible attempts to convert them to Islam by Muslims from the northwest.

When the French arrived and claimed the area in 1896, Mossi resistance ended with the capture of their capital at Ouagadougou. In 1919, certain provinces from Upper Senegal and Niger were united into a separate colony called the Upper Volta in the French West Africa federation. In 1932, the new colony was dismembered in a move to economise; it was reconstituted in 1937 as an administrative division called the Upper Coast. After World War II, the Mossi renewed their pressure for separate territorial status and on 4 September 1947, Upper Volta became a French West African territory again in its own right.

The indigenous population was highly discriminated against. For example, African children were not allowed to ride bicycles or pick fruit from trees, "privileges" reserved for the children of colonists. Violating these regulations could land parents in jail.

A revision in the organisation of French overseas territories began with the passage of the Basic Law (Loi Cadre) of 23 July 1956. This act was followed by reorganisational measures approved by the French parliament early in 1957 that ensured a large degree of self-government for individual territories. Upper Volta became an autonomous republic in the French community on 11 December 1958.

Upper Volta achieved independence on 5 August 1960. The first president, Maurice Yaméogo, was the leader of the Voltaic Democratic Union (UDV). The 1960 constitution provided for election by universal suffrage of a president and a national assembly for five year terms; however, soon after coming to power, Yaméogo banned all political parties other than the UDV.

== Colonial governors ==
=== Lieutenant Governors (1919–1932) ===
- Édouard Hesling (9 November 1919 – 7 August 1927)
  - Robert Arnaud (7 August 1927 – 13 January 1928), acting
- Albéric Fournier (13 January 1928 – 22 December 1932)
- Gabriel Descemet (22 December 1932 – 31 December 1932)

=== Governors (1947–1958) ===
  - Gaston Mourgues (6 September 1947 – 29 April 1948), acting
- Albert Mouragues (29 April 1948 – 23 February 1953)
- Salvador Jean Étcheber (23 February 1953 – 3 November 1956)
- Yvon Bourges (3 November 1956 – 15 July 1958)
  - Max Berthet (15 July 1958 – 11 December 1958), acting

=== High Commissioners (1958–1960) ===
- Max Berthet (11 December 1958 – February 1959)
- Paul Masson (February 1959 – 5 August 1960)

== People born in French Upper Volta ==
- Norbert Zongo
- Gilbert Diendéré

== See also ==
- Upper Voltan Territorial Assembly election, 1957
- List of French possessions and colonies
- French colonial empire
- French West Africa
- Heads of state of Burkina Faso
- Heads of government of Burkina Faso
