= June 1978 =

Month of 1978

<<	June 1978					>>
Su	Mo	Tu	We	Th	Fr	Sa
				1	2	3
4	5	6	7	8	9	10
11	12	13	14	15	16	17
18	19	20	21	22	23	24
25	26	27	28	29	30

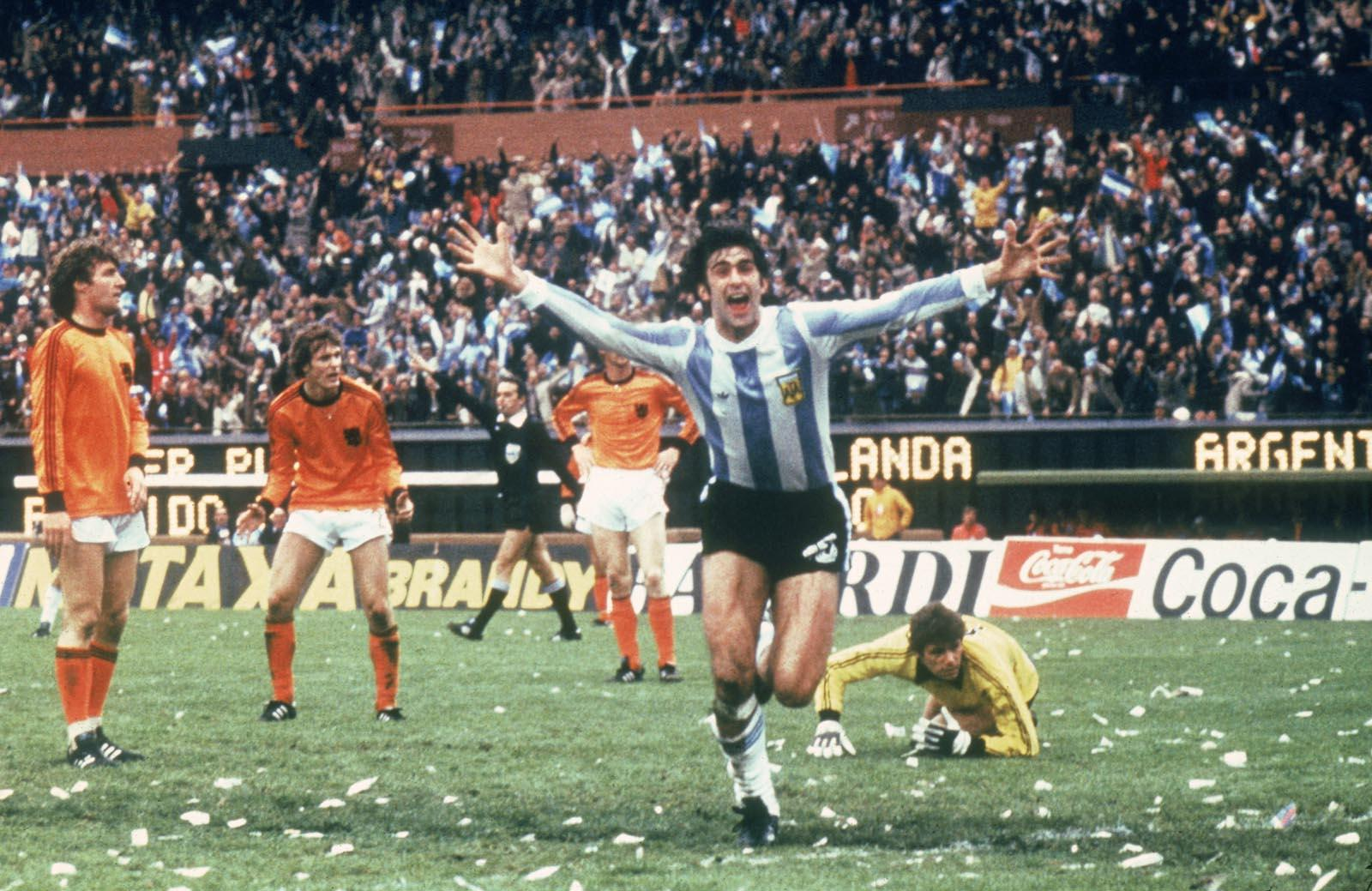
June 25, 1978: Argentina meets the Netherlands in the World Cup final and wins, 3 to 1. Pictured is Argentina's Mario Kempes after scoring the go-ahead in extra time past Jan Jongbloed.

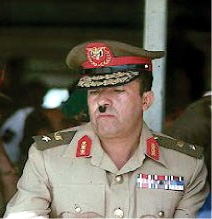
June 24, 1978: North Yemen President Ahmad al-Ghashmi assassinated

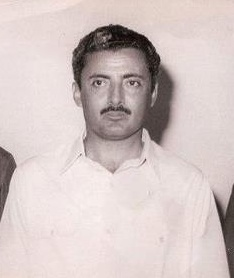
June 26, 1978: South Yemen President Salim Rubai Ali deposed and executed

The following events occurred in June 1978:

== June 1, 1978 (Thursday) ==
- The 1978 FIFA World Cup started in Argentina with teams from 16 nations competing in four groups of four teams each, with each team playing the other members of their group once. Group 1 had the national teams of Argentina, France, Hungary and Italy; Group 2 had Mexico, Poland, Tunisia and West Germany; Group 3 had Austria, Brazil, Spain and Sweden; and Group 4 had Iran, the Netherlands, Peru and Scotland. Only one game was played on the first day, with Poland and West Germany kicking off at 3:00 before a crowd of 67,579 at the Estadio Monumental in Buenos Aires, ending in a 0 to 0 draw.

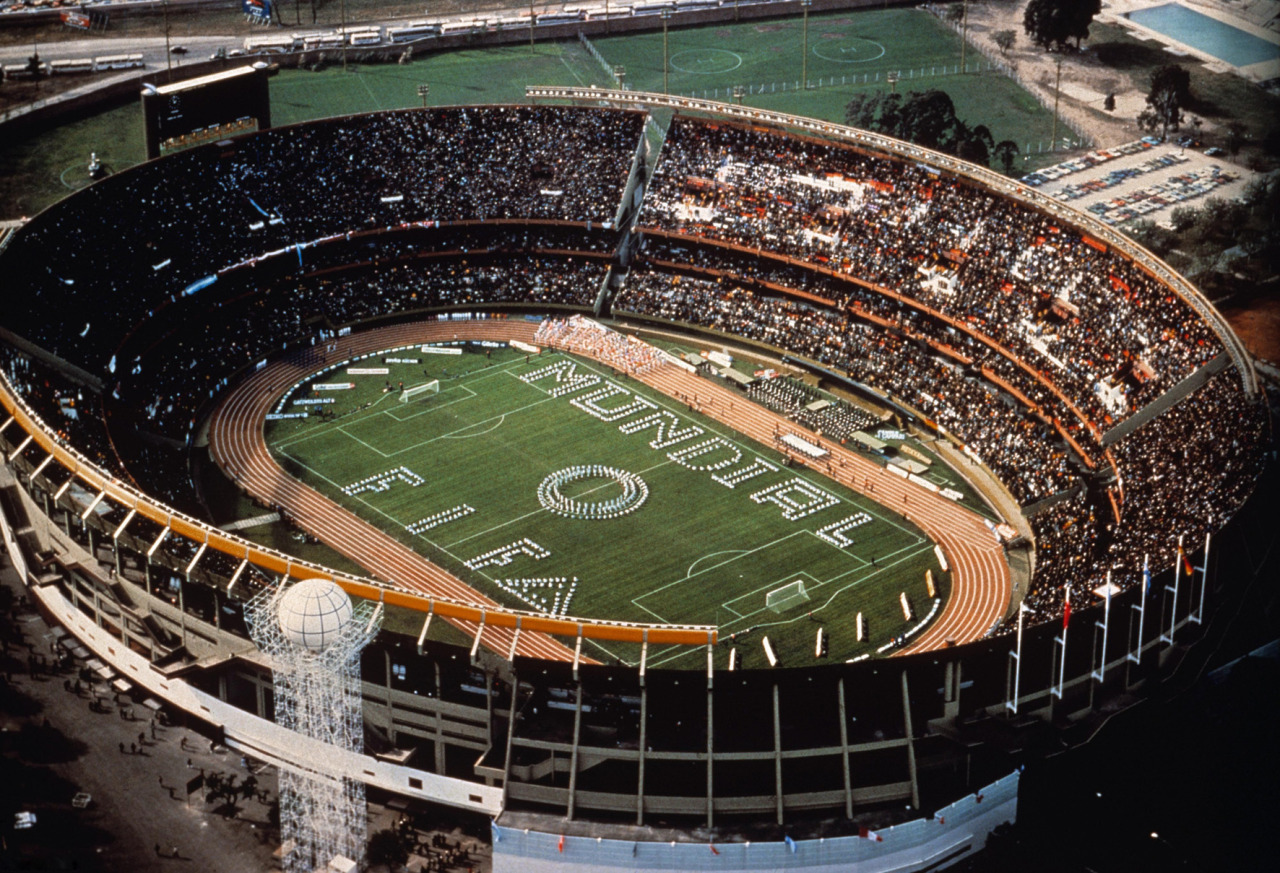
The 1978 FIFA World Cup opened in Argentina with 16 teams

== June 2, 1978 (Friday) ==
- Deng Xiaoping, Vice-Premier of the People's Republic of China, addressed a conference of leaders of the Chinese Communist Party and endorsed the reforms proposed by the Truth Criterion movement for modernization of agriculture, industry, defense and technology, and departing from the approach of the late Mao Zedong. Deng's support would lead to a drastic change in Communist China's economic growth.
- The CyberVision 2001 home computer was introduced, appearing in select Montgomery Ward department stores, and billed as being "programmed to talk... play games, teach math, or help with your tax return." The user-friendly computer was offered for sale at $399 (equivalent to $1,925 in 2024).
- President Ferdinand Marcos of the Philippines designated Manila and the surrounding suburbs as the National Capital Region by his Presidential Decree No. 1396.
- Japan Air Lines Flight 115 had its tail struck on the runway while landing at Osaka International Airport. The incident caused damage to the rear pressure bulkhead, which was not properly repaired. The Aircraft operated a Boeing 747-146SR, registration JA8119, was later involved in the infamous crash of Japan Air Lines Flight 123 on August 12, 1985, the deadliest single-aircraft accident in aviation history. The tailstrike repair failure led to the eventual catastrophic decompression and loss of control of Flight 123, resulting in 520 fatalities.
- Born:
  - Nikki Cox, American TV actress known for Unhappily Ever After, Nikki and Las Vegas; in Los Angeles
  - Justin Long, American TV and film actor known for Ed and for Live Free or Die Hard; in Fairfield, Connecticut
- Died: Santiago Bernabéu Yeste, 82, Spanish footballer, player and president of Real Madrid C.F. since 1943, known for building Real Madrid into one of the most valuable sports franchises in the world.

== June 3, 1978 (Saturday) ==
- The first direct presidential election in Bangladesh was held, with ten candidates running for office, including President Ziaur Rahman, who was seeking re-election. President Ziaur received more than 75 percent of the votes cast, with former Bangladesh Army commander-in-chief M. A. G. Osmani garnering almost 22 percent. None of the other candidates received more than one-half of one percent of the votes.
- Born:
  - Suthida Bajrasudhabimalalakshana, former flight attendant and royal bodyguard who has been the Queen consort of Thailand since her marriage to Vajiralongkorn (King Rama X) since 2019; in Songkhla
  - Lyfe Jennings (stage name for Chester Jermaine Jennings), American R&B singer known for the top selling albums The Phoenix, Lyfe Change and I Still Believe; in Toledo, Ohio
  - Natalia Valevskaya, Russian fashion designer; in Moscow
- Died:
  - Deborah Howe, 31, American children's writer known for Bunnicula: A Rabbit-Tale of Mystery, which inaugurated the Bunnicula series of books continued by her husband, James Howe, died of cancer.
  - So Phim, 47, Cambodian guerrilla leader, former governor of the East Zone of the Democratic Kampuchea and third ranking Communist Party of Kampuchea official, committed suicide rather than facing torture and execution, after refusing to carry out the Cambodian genocide program of Pol Pot.

== June 4, 1978 (Sunday) ==
- Julio César Turbay was elected to a 4-year term as President of Colombia, defeating Belisario Betancur.
- Pakistan advanced its Project-706 two months after the April 4 breakthrough by nuclear physicist A. Q. Khan, as the Chaklala Air Force Base Centrifuge Laboratory succeeded at enriching uranium by electromagnetic isotope separation of ^{238}U and ^{235}U isotopes.
- Piano Jazz, the longest-running cultural program on the U.S. National Public Radio (NPR) network, was broadcast for the first time.
- AEK Athens F.C. defeated PAOK of Thessaloniki, 2 to 0, to win the Greek Football Cup, after the two teams had finished in first and second place in regular season play in the Alpha Ethniki league, the highest level of soccer football in Greece.
- Died:
  - Jorge de Sena, 58, Portuguese novelist and poet
  - Dominique Darel, 28, French-born Italian film actress, was killed in an automobile accident in Cannes.

== June 5, 1978 (Monday) ==
- The government of Vietnam announced that it would allow ships from the People's Republic of China to enter Vietnamese ports in order to evacuate people of Chinese descent, starting on June 20.
- The British television crime drama Strangers, starring Don Henderson, premiered on ITV and would run until 1982.
- Two days after appearing for Scotland in a 3 to 1 loss to Peru in the World Cup in Argentina, Willie Johnston was banned from the Scotland national team for life when he was found to have taken the banned stimulant fencamfamin.
- Born:
  - María Chivite, Spanish politician and president of the autonomous government of Navarre within Spain since 2019; in Cintruénigo, Navarre
  - Qasim al-Raymi, Yemeni militant and terrorist who served as the Emir of Al-Qaeda in the Arabian Peninsula from 2015 to his death (killed by airstrike, 2020)
  - Nick Kroll, American TV, stage and film comedian known for Kroll Show and the Broadway production of The Oh, Hello Show; in Rye, New York

== June 6, 1978 (Tuesday) ==
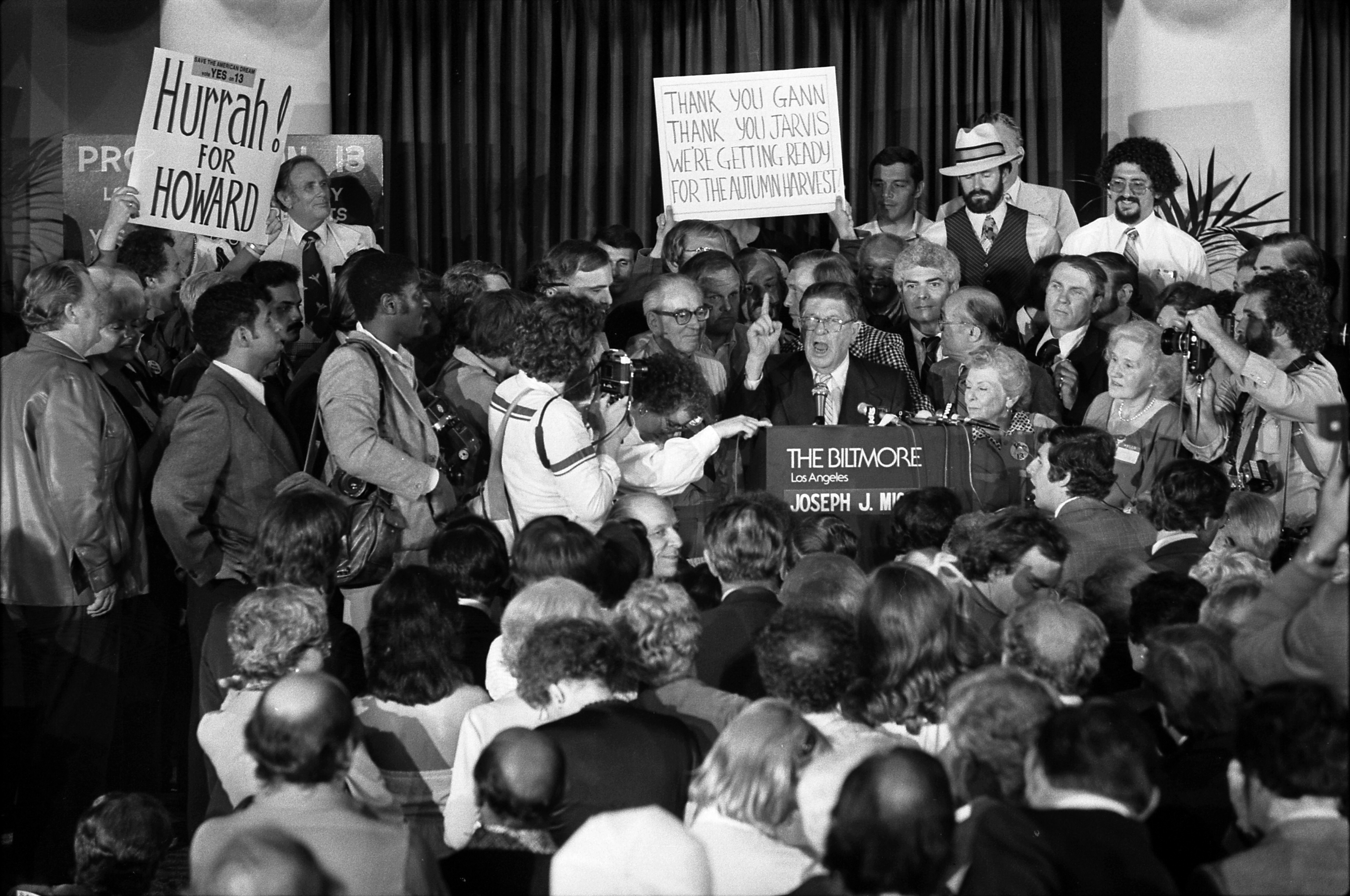
Howard Jarvis celebrating the passage of Proposition 13

- Voters in the U.S. state of California overwhelmingly approved "Proposition 13", an amendment to Article XIII of the state constitution passed in a citizens' initiative that had been placed on the ballot through the lobbying efforts of Howard Jarvis. The measure, approved by more than 62% of 6.8 million voters through direct democracy, reversed a 1976 increase in property taxes on California landowners, and placed limits on future increases in taxes. Placement of the proposition on a state election ballot began a "tax revolt" across the United States.
- The Shah of Iran removed his friend General Nematollah Nassiri from the position of Director of SAVAK, Iran's secret police agency, and appointed him as ambassador to Pakistan. Summoned back from Pakistan Nassiri would be arrested on orders of the Shah on November 8 along with 60 other SAVAK officials and, remaining in prison during the Shah's departure and the arrival of the Ayatollah Khomeini, would be executed on February 15, 1979.

The Vienna Convention stop sign

- The Vienna Convention on Road Signs and Signals, a multilateral treaty to standardize traffic signs, went into effect after ratification by 15 nations, almost ten years after it had been signed on November 8, 1968. The Convention, not signed in the U.S., Canada, Australia or China, applies to signs in almost all of Europe except for Ireland and Portugal.
- Born:
  - Konstantīns Konstantinovs, Latvian powerlifter who held the world record in his weight class with a raw deadlift of 426 kg (939.2 lb), for 13 years, from 2009 until 2022; in Liepāja, Latvian SSR, Soviet Union (d. 2018)
  - Judith Barsi, American child actress known for voicing the role of "Ducky" in the animated film The Land Before Time; in Los Angeles (murdered, 1988)
- Died: Paul Lambert, 43, American college basketball coach for Southern Illinois University, was killed in a fire at the Airport Holiday Inn motel in Columbus, Georgia, two months after being hired to be the head coach of Auburn University's men's basketball team, and six months before the start of the 1978-1979 college basketball season.

== June 7, 1978 (Wednesday) ==
- The Washington Bullets won the championship of the National Basketball Association (NBA) in the U.S. state of Washington, defeating the Seattle SuperSonics, 105 to 99, in Game 7 of the best-4-of-7 series.
- The English thoroughbred colt Shirley Heights, ridden by Greville Starkey narrowly defeated U.S.-bred Hawaiian Sound before a crowd of 300,000 at Epsom to win the 199th running of the Epsom Derby, the second race of the British Triple Crown of horse racing.
- British Rail unveiled its Advanced Passenger Train Prototype, capable of speeds of up to 162 miles per hour (261 km/h), and the most powerful domestic train to operate in Britain, but that would not be funded past 1983.
- Born:
  - Vijay Shekhar Sharma, Indian technology entrepreneur and founder of One97 Communications; in Aligarh, Uttar Pradesh
  - Bill Hader, American actor and comedian, winner of three Primetime Emmy Awards; in Tulsa, Oklahoma
- Died:
  - Ronald G.W. Norrish, 80, British chemist and 1967 Nobel Prize in Chemistry laureate, known for the Norrish reaction, a photochemical reaction taking place with ketones and aldehydes.
  - Joud el Bayeh, Lebanese banker and politician, director of Banque de la Méditerrannée and mayor of Kfardlakos, was assassinated by six armed men dispatched by Lebanese politician Antoine "Tony" Frangieh.

== June 8, 1978 (Thursday) ==
- Naomi James arrived in Dartmouth, Devon, 272 days after her departure on September 9, 1977, becoming the first woman to sail by herself around the world via Cape Horn, and only the second to so overall.
- A team of the French mountain police patrol located a sack of undelivered mail at the foot of the Bossons Glacier in the Alps, more than 27 years after it had been thrown clear of the November 3, 1950, crash of Air India Flight 245. All but eight of the 112 pieces of mail were forwarded to the addresses listed.
- At the Stadio Olimpico in Rome, Internazionale of Milan defeated S.S.C. Napoli of Naples, 2 to 1, to win the Coppa Italia, Italy's highest level professional soccer football tournament. Internazionale and Napoli had finished 5th and 6th in Serie A competition.
- Born:
  - Maria Menounos, American actress, journalist, and television presenter; in Medford, Massachusetts
  - Eun Ji-won, South Korean rapper and singer; in Seoul
- Died:
  - Jenny Hasselquist, 83, Swedish prima ballerina
  - Valéria Dienes, 99, Hungarian choreographer and philosopher
  - Ruth Rose, 82, American screenwriter best known for co-writing the script for the 1939 film King Kong as well as for The Last Days of Pompeii and Mighty Joe Young

== June 9, 1978 (Friday) ==
- Following a decision by church president Spencer W. Kimball and his advisers on the Quorum of the Twelve Apostles, the Church of Jesus Christ of Latter-day Saints announced the reversal of its 126-year old policy of not allowing black men to hold the priesthood. Kimball wrote in a letter that God "has heard our prayers, and by revelation has confirmed that the long-promised day has come when every faithful, worthy man in the church may receive thy priesthood."
- The United Kingdom's first and only helicopter shuttle service, Airlink, began as a service of British Airways Helicopters, using a Sikorsky S-61 helicopter to transport passengers between Gatwick Airport and Heathrow Airport, a distance of 14 miles (23 km). The service would last until February 9, 1986.
- Born:
  - Miroslav Klose, Polish-born German footballer with 137 caps for the German national team from 2001 to 2014, holder of the record for most goals scored (16) in the FIFA World Cup, 2006 German footballer of the year; in Opole, Poland
  - Michaela Conlin, American TV actress known for Bones; in Allentown, Pennsylvania
  - Matt Bellamy, British musician and singer, lead vocalist for the Grammy Award winning rock band Muse; in Cambridge, Cambridgeshire

== June 10, 1978 (Saturday) ==
- Affirmed held off Alydar to win the Belmont Stakes and would be the last horse to win the U.S. Triple Crown of Horse Racing (the Kentucky Derby, Preakness Stakes and Belmont Stakes) for 37 years, until 2015.
- A fire at the Borås City Hotel in Sweden killed 22 people and injured 55 others, mostly technical college students celebrating the end of the school year with a dance. The fire broke out in the lobby of the hotel and quickly spread to a restaurant on the second floor, and the hotel ballroom on the third floor, where 150 people were attending the dance.
- Born:
  - Subhash Khot, Indian-born American mathematician and computer scientist; in Ichalkaranji, Maharashtra state
  - DJ Qualls (Donald Joseph Qualls), American TV actor known for Legit, Z Nation and The Man in the High Castle; in Nashville, Tennessee
  - Shane West (stage name for Shannon Snaith), American TV actor known for Nikita and for Salem; in Baton Rouge, Louisiana

== June 11, 1978 (Sunday) ==
- In Canada, 12 students of Saint John's School of Claremont, Ontario, all boys, died along with a staff member when four canoes capsized during a storm while they were boating on Lake Timiskaming. Some who avoided drowning died of hypothermia. Another 15 boys and three adults survived.
- Joseph Freeman Jr. was ordained as the first African-American elder in the Mormon priesthood.
- Born: Joshua Jackson, Canadian TV actor known for Fringe and Dr. Death, and the film One Week; in Vancouver
- Died: Akenzua II, 79, ceremonial monarch of the Edo people in the African nation of Nigeria as the Oba of Benin since 1933. Akenzua was succeeded as Oba by his son, Prince Solomon, who would be crowned as the Oba Erediauwa on March 23, 1979.

== June 12, 1978 (Monday) ==
- A 7.7 magnitude earthquake off of the coast of Japan killed 28 people and injured 1,325 others. The quake struck at 5:14 in the afternoon local time at the east coast of the Miyagi Prefecture
- David Berkowitz, also referred to as the "Son of Sam", received a 25-year prison sentence with the possibility of parole after he was found guilty of 6 counts of second degree murder and 7 counts of attempted second degree murder.
- For the first time, the U.S. House of Representatives allowed a live broadcast of one of its sessions, with Associated Press Radio after authorization by Speaker of the House Thomas "Tip" O'Neill.
- Died: Guo Moruo, 85, Chinese author, historian and archaeologist

== June 13, 1978 (Tuesday) ==
- The explosion of a gun turret on the Soviet navy cruiser Admiral Senyavin, during a test firing exercise, killed 37 of the ship's crew. The disaster occurred as shells were being fired from a 152 mm cannon. After eight were fired, a ninth shell became stuck in the gun turret and on the next firing, the tenth shell impacted the ninth, exploding both and sending smoke back into the bow tower, killing everyone inside. The incident would remain secret until after the end of the Soviet Union in 1992.
- The Ehden massacre took place in Lebanon as 1,200 members of the Kataeb Phalangists killed almost 40 people in an attack on the mansion of Antoine "Tony" Frangieh, a leader of the Marada Brigade. The attack, ordered by Bachir Gemayel and carried out by hundreds of guerrillas led by Samir Geagea and Elie Hobeika, was made in retaliation for the June 7 assassination of Joud el Bayeh. Gemayel would be elected President of Lebanon in 1982, but assassinated before his inauguration.
- Complying with a United Nations resolution, Israel withdrew its troops from Lebanon after 91 days of occupation. Rather than turning authority over to a UN peacekeeping force, however, the Israelis invited Lebanese Christians to replace them.
- Born: Vishwananda (Mahadeosingh Komalram), Mauritiuan Hindu guru who founded Bhakti Marga; in Beau Bassin-Rose Hill

== June 14, 1978 (Wednesday) ==
- In Guatemala, 17 soldiers were killed by a bomb planted by the Guerrilla Army of the Poor, in an apparent retaliation for the May 29 massacre of 38 protesters in the village of Panzós.
- American mobster Anthony Provenzano, nicknamed "Tony Pro", suspected in the 1975 disappearance of Jimmy Hoffa, was convicted of the 1961 murder of Anthony Castellitto and sentenced to life in prison. He would die ten years later at the Lompoc Federal Penitentiary at the age of 71.
- The Cleveland Barons (NHL) of the National Hockey League went out of business, with the league merging the Barons' assets and debts with those of the Minnesota North Stars. The Barons' failure was the first in more than 25 years, when the NFL's Dallas Texans folded after the 1952 NFL season, and would be the last in any of the four major North American sports leagues (MLB, NFL, NBA and NHL) for 46 years until the folding of the NHL's Arizona Coyotes in 2024.
- Baseball player Pete Rose began what would become the longest streak in the National League of consecutive games with at least one hit, making a single in a game against the Chicago Cubs. The streak would reach 44 games in a row, making it the first challenge to Joe DiMaggio's 56-game hitting streak in 1941, before ending on August 1.
- Born:
  - Diablo Cody (pen name for Brook Busey Maurio), American screenwriter, producer and director, Academy Award, BAFTA award and Tony Award winner; in Lemont, Illinois
  - Nikola Vujčić, Croatian basketball player and team manager of Maccabi Tel Aviv, EuroLeague all-star and 2007 Israeli League MVP; in Vrgorac, SR Croatia, Yugoslavia
- Died:
  - Robert Fabian, 77, English crime writer, retired Detective Superintendent and TV personality known for Fabian of the Yard
  - Dox (pen name for Jean Razakandraina), 65, Madagascar poet known for his work in poetry in the Malagasy and French launguages, was fatally injured after being accidentally knocked down a flight of stairs.

== June 15, 1978 (Thursday) ==
- Italy's President Giovanni Leone resigned six months before his term was to expire, after having been convicted of tax evasion and involvement in a bribery scandal. Amintore Fanfani, the president of the Italian Senate, automatically became the acting president and called upon the parliament to elect a new president.
- The Soviet Union launched Soyuz 29 into space with cosmonauts Vladimir Kovalyonok and Aleksandr Ivanchenkov
- A fire at a Brazilian shipyard killed 13 construction workers in Porto Alegre. Another 300 workers were able to escape injury.
- King Hussein of Jordan married 26-year-old Lisa Halaby, who took the name Queen Noor.
- Born: Wilfred Bouma, Dutch footballer with 37 caps for the Netherlands national team; in Helmond

== June 16, 1978 (Friday) ==
- At a joint ceremony in Panama City, U.S. President Jimmy Carter and Panama's military leader, General Omar Torrijos, signed the instruments of ratification of the Panama Canal Treaty and the Panama Canal Neutrality Treaty, providing that Panama would have full control of the operations of the Panama Canal, to take effect at noon on December 31, 1999.
- Grease, starring John Travolta and Olivia Newton-John, premiered, making its debut in U.S. theaters before being shown worldwide, and would go on to become the highest-grossing musical film of the year.
- The GOES-3 (Geostationary Operational Environmental Satellite) weather and communications satellite was launched from the U.S., and placed intogeostationary orbit the next day. Positioned over the U.S., it was used initially for weather forecasting as well as for communication. Ceasing to function as a weather satellite in 1989, it would continue until its deactivation on June 29, 2016, a communications satellite, operating for a total of 38 years.
- Born:
  - Daniel Brühl, Spanish-born German film and TV actor, star of Good Bye, Lenin! and Inglourious Basterds, three time European Film Awards and German Film Awards winner for Best Actor; in Barcelona
  - Fish Leong (stage name for Leong Chui Peng), popular Malaysian singer; in Bahau, Negeri Sembilan, Malaysia.
- Died: Sven Halvar Löfgren, 68, Swedish pulmonologist known for identifying Löfgren syndrome, a form of sarcoidosis

== June 17, 1978 (Saturday) ==
- In the U.S., the capsizing of the showboat Whipporwill drowned 16 of the 58 people on board. The boat was traveling on Pomona Lake in Osage County, Kansas for a dinner cruise when the F1 tornado struck the boat and caused it to overturn.
- Born: Isabelle Delobel, French competitive ice dancer and 2008 World Champion; in Clermont-Ferrand, Puy-de-Dôme département
- Died:
  - Ruth deForest Lamb, 81–82, American consumer rights activist
  - Robert B. Williams, 73, American film and TV character actor

== June 18, 1978 (Sunday) ==
- Voting was held in Peru for all 100 seats of the Asamblea Constituyente, an assembly convened by the South American nation's president, General Francisco Morales Bermudez, to create a new constitution as part of Peru's transition to democracy following 10 years of military rule.
- Born:
  - Ben Gleib (stage name for Ben Nathan Gleiberman), American comedian
  - Kathleen Aerts, Belgian singer and one of the three vocalists of the Belgian and Dutch "girl group" K3; in Geel
- Died:
  - Peter Štefan, 37, Slovak mathematician, was killed in a mountain climbing accident while attempting to scale Tryfan in Wales.
  - Harry Clork (pen name for Harry Prince), 89, American screenwriter and playwright
  - Leopold Anslinger, 87, German World War One flying ace with 10 confirmed kills.

== June 19, 1978 (Monday) ==
- The comic strip Garfield went into nationwide syndication.
- England cricketer Ian Botham became the first man in the history of the game to score a century and take eight wickets in one innings of a Test match.
- Born:
  - Dirk Nowitzki, German NBA basketball player, 2007 NBA Most Valuable Player, 2002 FIBA World Cup MVP, 2005 FIBA EuroBasket MVP, and 1999 German Bundesliga MVP; in Würzburg, West Germany
  - Zoe Saldaña (stage name for Saldaña Nazario), American film actress, star of Avatar and its sequel Avatar: The Way of Water; in Passaic, New Jersey

== June 20, 1978 (Tuesday) ==
- A 6.2 magnitude earthquake with a maximum Mercalli intensity of IX killed 49 people in northern Greece, 37 of whom were living in apartment buildings on the same city block in Thessaloniki.
- Born: Frank Lampard, English footballer with 106 caps for the England national team; in Romford, London
- Died: Mark Robson, 64, Canadian film director and producer known for Peyton Place, Valley of the Dolls and Earthquake

== June 21, 1978 (Wednesday) ==
- The musical Evita, written by Andrew Lloyd Webber, was performed for the first time, premiering in London's West End at the Prince Edward Theatre. With Elaine Paige in the title role as Argentine First Lady Eva Peron, Evita ran for 3,176 performances on the West End before closing more than seven years later on February 8, 1986. With an American cast, Evita would make its Broadway debut on September 25, 1979, and run for 1,567 performances (with Patti Lu Pone in the title role) until June 26, 1983.
- Four Imperial Iranian Air Force helicopters strayed into Soviet airspace and two were shot down near the village of Gjaurs in the Turkmen SSR.
- A shootout between Provisional IRA members and the British Army in Northern Ireland left one civilian and three IRA men dead.
- In World Cup competition, the determination of which two teams would qualify for the June 25 championship game was decided. In Group A, the Netherlands and Italy both had records of 1-1-0 (one win, one draw) and were scheduled to play each other in Buenos Aires. The Netherlands won, 2 to 1, to win Group A with a record of two wins and one tie. In Group B, Argentina and Brazil also had records of one win and one draw; Brazil had a goal differential of +3 points and Argentina +2 points. In the first match, Brazil beat Poland 3 to 1 to increase their differential to +5, so Argentina had to win and to get at least four goals more than opponent Peru; Argentina defeated Peru, 6 goals to 0.
- Born:
  - Erica Durance, Canadian TV actress known for Saving Hope and for Smallville; in Calgary
  - Jean-Pascal Lacoste, French singer (known for the song "L'Agitateur") and TV actor (known for Section de recherches); in Toulouse, Haute-Garonne département

== June 22, 1978 (Thursday) ==
- Charon, a satellite of Pluto, was discovered by astronomer James Christy at the United States Naval Observatory Flagstaff Station in Arizona.
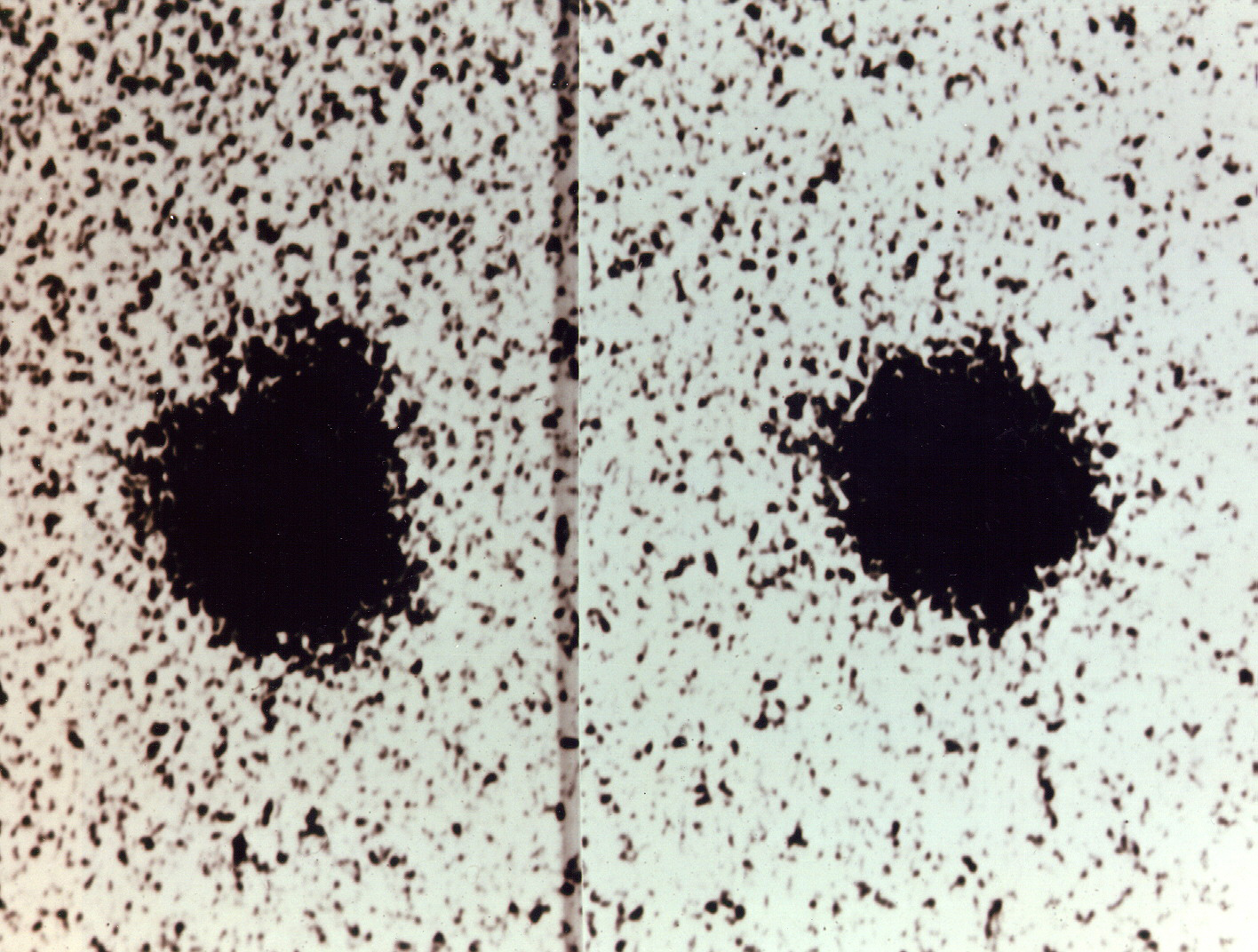
  plate on left showing Charon compared to plate on the right, as viewed from Earth
  Christy had been examining highly magnified images of Pluto on photographic plates taken with the telescope in April and notice a slight bulge that was visible at regular intervals between times that the photos were taken. As a result of the discovery, postulations about Pluto's size, mass, and other physical characteristics because the calculated mass and albedo of the Pluto–Charon system had previously been attributed to Pluto alone. The International Astronomical Union formally announced Christy's discovery to the world on July 7, 1978.
- Born: Dan Wheldon, English racing driver, winner of the Indianapolis 500 in 2005 and 2011, and 24 Hours of Daytona in 2006; in Emberton, Buckinghamshire (killed in racing accident, 2011)

== June 23, 1978 (Friday) ==
- The Vumba massacre took place in Rhodesia as guerrillas of the Zimbabwe African National Liberation Army attacked the civilian members of the Elim Pentecostal Mission, murdering eight British missionaries and four children.
- A shootout in the La Mesa Prison in Mexico's Baja California state, near Tijuana, killed Warden Salvador Gonzales Gutierrez, an assistant warden, two prison guards and four prisoners. Gonzalez had been targeted for assassination for his attempts to reform the prison by stopping wealthy narcotics dealers who continued to operate behind the prison walls.
- Born: Frédéric Leclercq, French musician, songwriter and guitarist for the death metal group Sinsaenum and bassist for DragonForce; in Charleville-Mézières, Ardennes département
- Died: Richard "Toby" Tobias, 46, American stock car and sprint car racer known for his modification of stock cars by producing a chassis of tubular steel, was killed in a crash while competing in a USAC spring car race at the Flemington Speedway in New Jersey. He was inducted into the Eastern Motorsports Press Association, the National Sprint Car and the Northeast Dirt Modified Halls of Fame.

== June 24, 1978 (Saturday) ==
- Ahmad al-Ghashmi, President of the Yemen Arab Republic since the October 11 assassination of his predecessor in office, was assassinated by an envoy from South Yemen, who had been sent by South Yemen President Salim Rubai Ali. Both President al-Ghashmi and the South Yemen envoy were killed in the explosion of a bomb inside a briefcase. Salim Rubai Ali was assassinated in a coup three days later.
- The Gay & Lesbian Solidarity March was held in Sydney, Australia, to mark the ninth anniversary of the Stonewall riots in the United States. The event would later become the annual Sydney Gay and Lesbian Mardi Gras, and include a festival.
- Born:
  - Shunsuke Nakamura, Japanese footballer with 98 caps for the Japan national team; in Yokohama
  - Juan Román Riquelme, Argentine footballer with 51 caps for the Argentina national team; in San Fernando de la Buena Vista

== June 25, 1978 (Sunday) ==
- Argentina defeated the Netherlands, 3 to 1, after extra time to win the 1978 FIFA World Cup. Argentina had been leading, 1 to 0, with nine minutes to play when Dirk Nanninga, a substitute for the Netherlands, scored in the 81st minute to tie the game. After 15 minutes, the score was still 1 to 1. Mario Kempes, who made Argentina's first score, made the go-ahead goal past Dutch goalkeeper Jan Jongbloed in the second overtime for a 2 to 1 lead and then made an assist to Daniel Bertoni who effectively put the game out of reach.
- The rainbow flag of the LGBT movement was flown for the first time, in its original form, and made its debut at the San Francisco Gay Freedom Day Parade.
- Born:
  - Aramis Ramírez, Dominican Republic MLB baseball player, winner of the 2011 Hank Aaron Award and the 2011 Silver Slugger Award; in Santo Domingo
  - Aftab Shivdasani, Indian film actor and comedian; in Bombay (now Mumbai)

== June 26, 1978 (Monday) ==
- Salim Rubai Ali, President of the People's Democratic Republic of Yemen (South Yemen) since 1969, was overthrown in a coup d'état by Abdul Fattah Ismail and executed by firing squad the same day.
- The Palace of Versailles in France was heavily damaged by a bomb planted by Breton nationalists. Two Breton nationalist terrorists, Lionel Chenviere and Patrick Montausier, were arrested four days later by police at the Breton capital, Rennes.
- Born: Daniel Constantin, Deputy Prime Minister of Romania in 2014 and 2017; in Pitești

== June 27, 1978 (Tuesday) ==
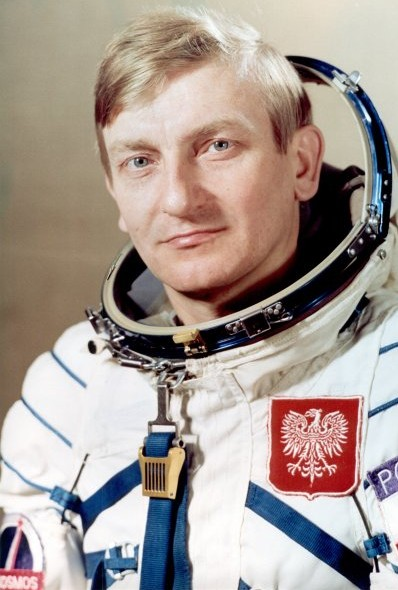
Hermaszewski, the first space traveler from Poland

- Soyuz 30 was launched from the Soviet Union with the first cosmonaut from Poland, Mirosław Hermaszewski, along with Belarusian Soviet cosmonaut Pyotr Klimuk, who was on his third mission. Hermaszewski became only the space traveler who was a citizen of neither the Soviet Union nor the United States, and was trained and sent under the Soviet Interkosmos program.
- Seasat, the first orbiting satellite designed for remote sensing of the Earth's oceans, was launched by the U.S. from Cape Canaveral. The satellite's mission would last for less than four months, ending on October 10, 1978, when a short circuit in Seasat's electrical system caused it to shut down.
- In Moscow, the U.S. Embassy gave sanctuary to a group of seven Russian people who rushed passed Soviet police into the embassy entrance, and requested asylum. Pyotr Vashchenko, his wife Augusta and three of their daughters were accompanied by two other people who identified themselves as members of a sect of Pentecostal Christians. For the next five years, the "Siberian Seven" would stay inside the U.S. embassy compound, living in a one-room basement apartment in what one reporter would describe as "religious refugees, embarrassing to one superpower, frustrating to the other." The group would finally be granted exit visas and permission to emigrate by the Soviet government on June 26, 1983.
- Born: Olukorede Yishau, Nigerian novelist known for In The Name Of Our Father (2018) and Vaults of Secrets (2020); in Somolu, Lagos State
- Died: Josette Day (stage name for Josette Dagory), 63, French film actress

== June 28, 1978 (Wednesday) ==
- The landmark U.S. Supreme Court decision of Regents of the University of California v. Bakke, commonly called "the Bakke case", held that specific racial quotas, to redress prior discrimination against U.S. minorities, were unconstitutional. The Court upheld the validity of the policy of affirmative action.
- The Qaa massacre took place in Lebanon as a retaliation by the Zgharta Liberation Army against members of the Kataeb Regulatory Forces for the June 13 Ehden massacre, which had been carried out by the Kateeb in retaliation for the June 7 assassination of Joud el Bayeh. The Zgharta forces shot 34 people, 34 of whom were in the town of Qaa and then killed six more in the village of Ras Baalbek.
- Born:
  - S. Ryan Smith, American businessman, billionaire and sports team owner; in Eugene, Oregon
  - Ha Ji-won, South Korean film actress; in Seoul
- Died: Clifford Dupont, 72, the first President of Rhodesia from 1970 to 1975

== June 29, 1978 (Thursday) ==
- Arif Heydarov, the Minister of Internal Affairs in the Soviet Union's Azerbaijani SSR and a KGB officer in charge of security in what was then a constituent republic of Soviet Union, was assassinated by an official of the republic's penitentiary. Heydarov, the Deputy Internal Affairs Minister, Salahaddin Kazimov and an assistant, Aziz Safikhanov, were at a branch office in Agdash when Zia Muradov entered the office and shot both of them before committing suicide. Heydarov died at the scene, and Kazimov died three days later. The news of the assassination would be published later with the statement, "Deputy of the Supreme Council of the Azerbaijan SSR, Minister of Internal Affairs of the Republic, Lieutenant General Arif Nazar oglu Heydarov died tragically while on duty. Deputy Minister Salakhaddin Kazimov and assistant Aziz Safikhanov, who were in his office, were shot along with the minister."
- CERN (Conseil européen pour la Recherche nucléaire), the European nuclear research organization, approved the UA1 experiment, a high-energy physics project using CERN's Super Proton–Antiproton Synchrotron to detect evidence subatomic particles.
- Multi-candidate elections were held in the southeastern African nation of Malawi for 87 of the 102 seats in the National Assembly. Although Malawian President Hastings Banda had to approve all candidates, and 15 of the seats were filled by Banda appointees, voters in 47 of the 87 constituencies had a choice of candidates, marking the first such election in the nation's history.
- Voting for President began in Italy to find a replacement for Giovanni Leone, as a 1,011-member electoral college gathered in Rome. The college was composed of all 323 Senators, all 630 Deputies and 58 regional delegates. On the first three ballots, a two-thirds majority (at least 675 votes) was necessary to win, and on the first ballot, former Justice Minister Guido Gonella of the Christian Democrats received 392 votes, Communist Party candidate Giorgio Amendola had 339 and the other votes were divided among ten candidates.
- Born:
  - Charlamagne tha God (stage name for Lenard McKelvey), American radio host known for the syndicated program The Breakfast Club, and inductee to the Radio Hall of Fame; in Charleston, South Carolina
  - Bongani Bongo, South African Minister of State Security for four months 2017–2018
  - Luke Kirby, Canadian actor and Primetime Emmy Award winner; in Hamilton, Ontario
  - Nicole Scherzinger, American singer and actress, 2024 Laurence Olivier Award winner; in Honolulu
- Died:
  - Bob Crane, 50, American actor known as the star of the TV series Hogan's Heroes, was beaten to death at his apartment in Scottsdale, Arizona
  - Aldo Ferraresi, 76, Italian concert violinist

== June 30, 1978 (Friday) ==
- Ethiopia began a massive offensive in Eritrea.
- The accidental explosion of an ice cream truck in New York City injured 114 bystanders in lower Manhattan, 15 of whom sustained serious injuries.
- The inaugural voyage of the Venture Cruise Lines ocean liner SS America began with a ship unprepared for business. Problems with its lack of cleanliness, leaking pipes and overbooking that caused many to be turned away, ended with passengers so angry that the ship returned to New York and 969 disembarked. The ship departed again later in the day, and 200 more passengers elected to leave. On its third try on July 3, SS America stopped at Nova Scotia and was served with $2,500,000 worth of claims for refund. The ship would be impounded on July 18, fail its inspection (with a score of 6 out of 100) and be ordered sold on August 28 after Venture Cruise Lines filed for bankruptcy.
- Died: William F. Harrah, 67, founder of Harrah's Casino in 1946, operator at the time of the world's biggest purely gaming casino business
