= July 1978 =

Month of 1978

<<	July 1978					>>
Su	Mo	Tu	We	Th	Fr	Sa
						1
2	3	4	5	6	7	8
9	10	11	12	13	14	15
16	17	18	19	20	21	22
23	24	25	26	27	28	29
30	31

The following events occurred in July 1978:

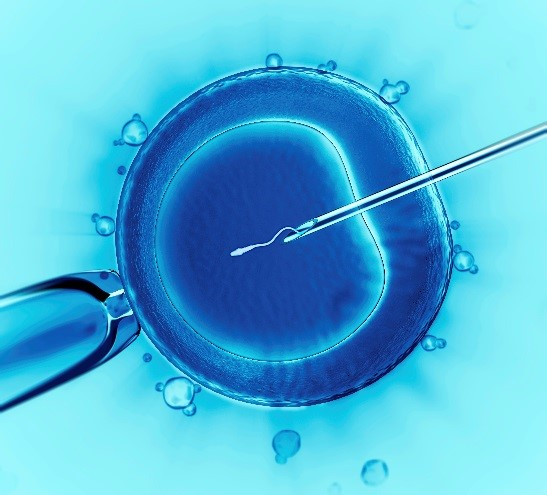
July 25, 1978: The first human being conceived by in vitro fertilization is born.

July 7, 1978: The Solomon Islands are granted independence by Britain

== July 1, 1978 (Saturday) ==
The new Northern Territory flag

- Australia's Northern Territory (NT) became a self-governing unit, with Paul Everingham, the Legislative Assembly majority leader, becoming the first Chief Minister. The transition to self-government was celebrated with the raising for the first time of the NT's flag at a ceremony in the capital, Darwin.
- Guerrillas from the Zimbabwe African National Union (ZANU) carried out the massacre of 14 black African workers and their families who lived on a white-owned farm near the town of Rusape in Rhodesia, including five children.
- General Fernando Lucas García was inaugurated for a four-year term as the new President of Guatemala, succeeding Kjell Laugerud García.
- Former U.S. President Richard Nixon appeared at his first public rally since his 1974 resignation, after accepting an invitation to the small town of Hyden, Kentucky for the dedication of the newly-built Richard M. Nixon Recreation Center, which the government of Leslie County, Kentucky, had named in his honor. More than 4,000 people crowded into the gymnasium at the center to listen to Nixon's 41-minute speech.
- The first Texxas Jam rock festival was held at the Cotton Bowl stadium in Dallas, and featured such artists as Ted Nugent, Aerosmith, Journey, the Atlanta Rhythm Section, Heart, and comedians Cheech & Chong.
- The 1978 Memphis fire and police strikes commenced with a strike action by firefighters.
- Born:
  - Mark Hunter, British rower and 2008 Olympic gold medalist; in Forest Gate, Greater London
  - Aleki Lutui, Tongan rugby union player in the New Zealand league, with 38 caps for the Tonga national team; in Tofoa
- Died: General Kurt Student, 88, Nazi German Luftwaffe officer and convicted war criminal known for creating the Fallschirmjäger paratrooper force and for the 1941 massacre of civilians on Crete

== July 2, 1978 (Sunday) ==
- Australia's government announced that it was purchasing the Cocos Islands from their owner, John Clunies-Ross, whose family had been granted private ownership of the 27 Indian Ocean atolls in 1886 by the British Empire's Queen Victoria. The Commonwealth of Australia had placed the Cocos under government authority in 1955. At the time of Australia's acquisition, the Cocos had 360 inhabitants, mostly Australians of Malay descent as well as the Clunies-Ross family.
- As the deadlock in Italy's presidential election continued in the electoral college, the founder of the Italian Socialist Party, Chamber of Deputies President Sandro Pertini was introduced as a compromise candidate.
- The People's Republic of China announced that it would not provide further economic aid to Vietnam, after having given 14 billion U.S. dollars to North Vietnam and over the previous 20 years, with decreasing amounts after the 1975 conquest of South Vietnam.
- The last edition of the New York Times to be set using Linotype machines was released.
- Born:
  - Jüri Ratas, Prime Minister of Estonia from 2016 to 2021; in Tallinn, Estonian SSR, Soviet Union
  - Ganesh Kishan, Indian film actor, winner of two Filmfare Best Actor awards; in Adakamaranahalli, Nelamangala, Karnataka state

== July 3, 1978 (Monday) ==
- The Amazon Co-operation Treaty (ACT) was signed by the South American nations of Bolivia, Brazil, Colombia, Ecuador, Guyana, Peru, Suriname and Venezuela to promote sustainable development of the basin of the Amazon River valley.
- The children's afternoon TV program Récré A2 premiered on the French TV network Antenne 2, and would run for almost 10 years. Intended to run only during summer vacation, the show was broadcast as an after school program from 5:30 to 6:30 p.m. on most weekdays, with a two-hour program on Wednesday afternoons from 3:00 to 5:00. It would conclude on June 29, 1988, a few days short of its 10th anniversary."
- By a vote of 5 to 4, the U.S. Supreme Court upheld the right of the Federal Communications Commission (FCC) to ban profane language from the radio and television broadcast from within the United States, holding that the right of free speech guaranteed in the First Amendment of the U.S. Constitution did not include the right to use "indecent language" in broadcasts, and defined "indecent" as "not conforming to generally-accepted standards of morality."
- Born: Mizuki Noguchi, Japanese long-distance runner and 2004 Olympics women's marathon gold medalist; in Shizuoka Prefecture
- Died:
  - Michela Schiff Giorgini, 54, Italian archaeologist specializing in Egyptology, known for her excavations of the Temple of Amenhotep III and his queen, Tiye, died of meningitis.
  - James Daly, 59, American TV, film and stage actor best known as the co-star of the TV hospital drama Medical Center, died of a heart attack.

== July 4, 1978 (Tuesday) ==
- U.S. Patent No. 4,098,260 was awarded to inventor William Goettl for designing the first solar thermal collector, initially designed to be used in providing solar panels and a system for air circulation to be placed on the roofs of buildings to safely warm water pipes and air ducts.
- Born: Becki Newton, American actress known for Ugly Betty and The Lincoln Lawyer; in New Haven, Connecticut

== July 5, 1978 (Wednesday) ==
- General Ignatius Acheampong, President of Ghana since 1975 as Chairman of the National Redemption Council of the West African nation, was overthrown in a military coup d'etat led by his Chief of Staff of the Ghana Armed Forces, Lieutenant General Fred Akuffo.
- The Soyuz 30 spacecraft returned to Earth after its crew, Soviet cosmonaut Pyotr Klimuk and Mirosław Hermaszewski, the cosmonaut from Poland, had completed almost eight days on the Salyut 6 space station.
- Born: Nandamuri Kalyan Ram, Indian Telugu cinema film actor and producer known for 118; in Hyderabad, Andhra Pradesh

== July 6, 1978 (Thursday) ==
- A fire killed 12 people and injured 15 others after breaking out on a British Railways sleeping car. The fire, caused by the ignition of bags of linen that had been placed next to an electric heater, broke out in the early morning while passengers were riding from Plymouth, Devon to London. By the time the fire was discovered at 2:41, the train stopped near Taunton, Somerset and most of the victims had been killed by carbon monoxide poisoning.
- South Korea's President Park Chung-hee was re-elected for the fourth time by an electoral college of 2,581 members who had been approved by voters on May 18. President Park was the only candidate on the ballot and received 2,577 votes, while three electors did not cast a ballot and one, Park Seung-guk, submitted a blank ballot as a protest against the process.
- Born: Tia Mowry and Tamera Mowry, American actresses known for Sister, Sister; at Coleman Kaserne U.S. Army Base in Gelnhausen, West Germany
- Died:
  - Renzo Montagna, 84, Italian Army officer and fascist who was the last commander of the Blackshirts paramilitary group and later the police director of the Nazi-backed Italian Social Republic
  - Babe Paley (b. Barbara Cushing), 63, American magazine editor, socialite and fashion icon, died of lung cancer.
  - Pietro Montana, 88, Italian-born American sculptor

== July 7, 1978 (Friday) ==
- The Solomon Islands became independent from the United Kingdom. with Sir Peter Kenilorea as the first Prime Minister and Sir Baddeley Devesi as the first Governor-General.
- Francisco Mendes, Prime Minister of Guinea-Bissau since its independence in 1973, was killed in a single vehicle car accident near the city of Bafatá.
- What has been described as "the first recorded hip hop song", "Enterprise" was released as part of the 41 songs on the album Runaways (Original Broadway Cast Recording), from the 1978 Broadway musical Runaways.
- Born:
  - Misia (stage name for Misaki Itō), popular Japanese singer and philanthropist; in Tsushima, Nagasaki Prefecture
  - Saud al-Qahtani, Saudi Arabian advisor to King Abdullah, accused in an arrest warrant in Turkey for the 2018 murder of Jamal Khashoggi at the Saudi consulate in Turkey; in Riyadh
  - Mustafa al-Shamyri, Yemeni citizen imprisoned at the U.S.-owned Guantanamo Bay detention camp for 13 years from 2004 to 2017 after being accused falsely of terrorism as a victim of mistaken identity.
- Died:
  - Morris the Cat, 17, popular advertising mascot for the Star-Kist Foods company who had appeared in dozens of television commercials for 9Lives catfood since 1966, with actor John Erwin doing the voice-over for the cat's thoughts.
  - Henry Trefflich, 70, German-born American animal importer nicknamed "The Monkey King" for his capture and reselling of wild animals to zoos around the world

== July 8, 1978 (Saturday) ==
- Voting for President was completed by a 1,011-member electoral college in Italy, composed of all 323 Senators, all 630 Deputies and 58 regional delegates. Sandro Pertini, the President of the Chamber of Deputies, received 832 votes on the 16th ballot, well over the 506 required for a majority. Sandro Pertini was sworn in as President of Italy, the next day, exactly two months after the May 9 assassination of former Premier (and favorite for the office of president) Aldo Moro. Pertini said in a speech to a joint session of the Parliament at the Montecitorio Palace, "If it had not been for the ruthless assassination, he, not I, would speaking to you today from this platform."
- Brazil's Museu de Arte Moderna, which had opened in 1948 in Rio de Janeiro, lost 90 percent of its works of modern art (950 out of 1055) when the museum accidentally caught fire. Among the works destroyed were paintings by Pablo Picasso ("Cubist Head" and "Portrait of Dora Maar"), Miró ("Persons in a Landscape"), Salvador Dalí ("Egg on a Plate, Without the Plate"), Max Ernst, and Joaquín Torres-García, whose artworks were on display as part of a retrospective sponsored by the museum.
- Born: Erin Morgenstern, American novelist known for The Night Circus; in Marshfield, Massachusetts

== July 9, 1978 (Sunday) ==
- The first elections in 12 years were held in Bolivia, with the government declaring General Juan Pereda as the winner of the presidential election, and reportedly defeating former presidents Hernán Siles Zuazo (who served 1956 to 1960) and Víctor Paz Estenssoro (who served 1960 to 1964). Investigations supported allegations of a rigged election, including the fact that the government that 1,971,968 votes had been cast, 102.6 percent of the 1,921,556 registered voters. Pereda's Unión Nacionalista del Pueblo (UNP) party was also reported to have won a majority of votes (53%) for the Chamber of Deputies. The South American nation's electoral court annulled the results 11 days later and Pereda became President anyway on July 21, when a military coup d'etat removed General Hugo Banzer.
- Abd ar-Razzaq an-Naif, a former Iraqi military officer who was a vocal opponent of Iraq's President Saddam Hussein, and who had served as Prime Minister of Iraq for two weeks in 1968, was shot and mortally wounded by members of Saddam's Mukhabarat secret police as he was leaving the Intercontinental Hotel in London. He died the next day.
- Lear, an opera with music by composer Aribert Reimann, and a libretto by Claus H. Henneberg, and based on William Shakespeare's tragedy King Lear, was given its first performance, debuting at the National Theatre Munich, with Gerd Albrecht conducting.
- The Houston Aeros, the first champions of the financially-ailing World Hockey Association and rival to the older National Hockey League (NHL), folded after six seasons, leaving the WHA with only seven teams for the 1978-79 season, which would prove to be the last for the league.
- Born:
  - Gulnara Samitova-Galkina, Russian distance runner, gold medalist in the women's 3000m steeplechase competition in the 2008 Olympics, holder of the women's world record from 2003 to 2016; in Naberezhnye Chelny, Russian SFSR, Soviet Union
  - Dmitri Dyuzhev, Russian film, TV and stage star; in Astrakhan, Russian SFSR, Soviet Union
  - Urvashi Dholakia, Indian TV actress known for the long running television series Kasautii Zindagii Kay, winner of seven Indian Television Academy Awards; in Delhi
  - Linda Park, South Korean-born American TV actress best known for her portrayal of Hoshi Sato in Star Trek: Enterprise; in Seoul
- Died: Prince Nicholas of Romania, 74, former Prince Regent of the Kingdom of Romania from 1927 to 1930, died in exile in Spain.

== July 10, 1978 (Monday) ==
- Moktar Ould Daddah, who had been the President of Mauritania since the northwest African nation's independence in 1960, was overtrown in a coup d'etat by Colonel Mustafa Ould Salek.
- Voters in the South American nation of Guyana reportedly approved the proposal for a new constitution by an overwhelming majority, including new rules to outlaw future referendums on the constitution to make amendments. Prime Minister Forbes Burnham, whose People's National Congress Party had obtained control of 37 of the 53 seats in parliament, obtained a mandate to allow parliament to change the constitution by a two-thirds vote, and would push through changes canceling the upcoming election, changing Guyana to a presidential republic, and giving him broad powers as president. The government issued figures claiming that more than 70% of the registered voters turned out to vote, and that of those, more than 97% voted for the new constitution.
- Born: Ray Kay (stage name for Reinert K. Olsen), Norwegian photographer and video director, MTV Video Music Award winner; in Haugesund.

== July 11, 1978 (Tuesday) ==
- The explosion of a tanker-truck at a campsite killed 217 tourists in Spain at the Los Alfaques campground near Alcanar. The tanker was carrying 23,470 kilograms (51,740 lb) of liquid propylene picked up at a refinery at Tarragona, despite the maximum allowed load for the tanker having been 19,350 kilograms (42,660 lb). As the truck was driving past the campsite, the product of overheating and a lack of room to expand during thermal expansion, the pressure increased to the point that the tank exploded at 2:36 in the afternoon and spilled burning fuel into the crowd of tourists.
- What was, at the time, the most powerful solar flare ever recorded, with an x-ray classification of X15.0. The flare, which would not be exceeded until August 16, 1989, occurred in the course of Solar cycle 21, which had started in March 1976 and would last until 1986.
- Born:
  - Kim Kang-woo, South Korean film and TV actor known for The Taste of Money and the show The Missing
  - Mattias Gustafsson, Swedish team handball player with 20 caps for the Sweden men's national team

== July 12, 1978 (Wednesday) ==
- Voting was held in six Polynesian island territories on whether to be part of the future Federated States of Micronesia by accepting the nation's proposed constitution. More than 60% of the voters on the islands of Chuuk, Kosrae, Pohnpei and Yap approved becoming part of the FSM, while more than 60% of voters in the Marshall Islands rejected the FSM in favor of becoming an independent nation, and more than 55% those in Palau favored independence.
- Voters in Sierra Leone overwhelmingly approved a ballot measure to make the West African nation a one-party state. The All People's Congress (APC) of President Siaka Stevens became the only legal political party, with more than 97% of 2.2 million voters reportedly in favor, while parliament members elected from the Sierra Leone People's Party joined the APC. President Stevens had campaigned for the measure, arguing that a one-party state was "more African" than Western-style democracy.
- Born:
  - Topher Grace (Christopher John Grace), American TV and film actor known for That '70s Show; in New York City
  - Katrine Fruelund, Danish team handball player with 184 caps for the Denmark women's national team that won the Olympics in 2000 and 2004; in Randers.
  - Michelle Rodriguez, American film actor known as the female lead in The Fast and the Furious and its sequels; in San Antonio, Texas
- Died: Jay Williams, American science fiction and fantasy author best known for the Danny Dunn series of children's books between 1956 and 1977.

== July 13, 1978 (Thursday) ==
- Soviet Russian particle physicist Anatoli Bugorski was accidentally irradiated by more than 200,000 roentgens of radiation when he was attempting to inspect a malfunctioning particle accelerator, the U-70 synchrotron at the Institute for High Energy Physics in Protvino, near Moscow. The U-70 activated and fired a proton beam of 76 GeV of energy that passed through the occipital lobe and temporal lobe of his brain. Although severely burned and expected to die from what was considered a fatal dose of radiation, he survived and was still alive more than 40 years after the accident.
- The People's Socialist Republic of Albania, a Marxist Communist nation which had severed its relations with the Soviet Union in 1961, lost its only remaining financial supporter when the People's Republic of China announced that it would not provide further economic aid to the Balkan nation.
- Entertainment and Sports Programming, Inc., was incorporated in the U.S. state of Connecticut for a fee of $91, with a stated purpose of creating a cable television network for sports telecasts. The network would be launched on September 7, 1979 as ESPN.
- Lee Iacocca was fired from his job as the president of the Ford Motor Company by the Board of Directors, after clashing with Henry Ford II, the CEO and grandson of the founder. Iacocca would soon be hired as the president of the ailing Chrysler Corporation, the third largest U.S. auto maker after General Motors and Ford Motor, and turn Chrysler into a profitable company.
- Canadian jockey Ron Turcotte, who had ridden the thoroughbred racehorse Secretariat to victory in the U.S. Triple Crown races of 1973, was rendered a paraplegic after being thrown from the horse Flag of Leyte Gulf during a race at Belmont Park.
- Born: Gary David, Philippine pro basketball player who led the Philippine Basketball Association in scoring for four consecutive years from 2009 to 2013; in Dinalupihan
- Died: J. Clarence Karcher, American geophysicist who invented the reflection seismograph, described as "the means by which most of the world's oil reserves have been discovered."

== July 14, 1978 (Friday) ==
- Henri Maïdou took office as the last Prime Minister of the Central African Empire, after being appointed by the Emperor Bokassa. Upon the overthrow of Bokassa and the restoration of the Central African Republic a year later, Maïdou became Vice President in the regime of President David Dacko.
- Soviet dissident Anatoly Shcharansky was sentenced to three years in prison, followed by 10 years in a labor camp, after insisting that the Soviet Union should abide by its commitments in the 1975 Helsinki Accords to improve human rights. Shcharansky was convicted of "anti-Soviet agitation and propaganda" and on a lesser degree of treason under Articles 70 and 64-a of the penal code for his activity in the Moscow Helsinki Group.
- At the age of 65, American long distance swimmer Walter Poenisch became the first person to swim from Cuba to the United States, arriving at the island of Little Duck Key in the U.S. state of Florida, 33 hours after having departed from the Cuban capital, Havana.
- Died: Maria Grinberg, 69, Soviet Russian pianist

== July 15, 1978 (Saturday) ==
- "The Longest Walk", a project of the American Indian Movement in support of tribal sovereignty and protection of the rights of the indigenous peoples of the United States, was completed after 205 days and a journey of more than 3,200 miles (5,100 km) from San Francisco to Washington D.C. After starting on February 11 with a ceremony at Alcatraz Island off of the coast of San Francisco, the walk was completed with a rally of several thousand people in front of the Washington Monument. The U.S. Congress followed by withdrawing several proposed bills from consideration, and the approval of the American Indian Religious Freedom Act by both the House and the Senate on July 27, followed by the signing of the bill into law by U.S. President Carter on August 11.
- In India, the Deposit Insurance and Credit Guarantee Corporation (DICGC) was established to insure bank depots up to a limit of 500,000 rupees (equivalent to $61,000 USD at the time) for each depositor in an insured bank.
- Born: Yuri Nikitin, Ukrainian gymnast and 2004 Olympic gold medalist in the trampolining event; in Kherson, Ukrainian SSR, Soviet Union
- Died: Matthew Walker Sr., 71, African-American surgeon

== July 16, 1978 (Sunday) ==
- Pope Paul VI, leader of the Roman Catholic Church, became seriously ill at his summer residence at the Palace of Castel Gandolfo, the day after meeting with Italy's President Sandro Pertini. The 80-year-old Pontiff's condition worsened over the next three weeks and he would die on August 6.
- Died: Howard Estabrook (pen name for Howard Bolles), 94, American screenwriter, film director and stage actor, 1931 Academy Award winner for Best Adapted Screenplay for Cimarron

== July 17, 1978 (Monday) ==
- The parliament of North Yemen (officially the Yemen Arab Republic) approved Ali Abdullah Saleh as the Middle Eastern republic's new President, replacing the late Ahmad al-Ghashmi, who had been assassinated on June 24. Saleh was sworn in the next day.
- Born: Justine Triet, French film director known for Anatomie d'une chute (Anatomy of a Fall); in Fecamp, Seine-Maritime departement

== July 18, 1978 (Tuesday) ==
- The Pact of San José, signed in 1969 and creating the Inter-American Court of Human Rights, became effective upon its ratification by Grenada, an eleventh member of the Organization of American States. As of 2024, it is adhered to by 25 of the 35 member nations of the OAS, but not the U.S. or Canada.
- The World Chess Championship 1978 began in the Philippines at the city of Baguio and would contue for the next three months and 32 games. Anatoly Karpov, the defending world champion since 1975, faced challenger Viktor Korchnoi. Both players were from the Soviet Union.
- Born:
  - Shane Horgan, Irish rugby union player with 65 caps for the Republic of Ireland national team; in Bellewstown, County Meath
  - Joo Sang-wook, South Korean TV actor known for Special Affairs Team TEN; in Seoul

== July 19, 1978 (Wednesday) ==
- Bolivia's National Election Court issued an order annulling the results of the July 9 presidential election, because of evidence of "irregularities all along the process" during voting before a transition to civilian government, and directed that a new election be held within the next 180 days. General Juan Pereda, who had been declared the winner of the election, had asked to discard the results and to hold another vote "to avoid sorrow and tears for the nation."
- Born: Fahad Yasin Haji Dahir, Somali government official, Director of Somalia's HSNQ intelligence agency 2019 to 2021, National Security Advisor to the President from 2021 to 2022; in Mandera, Kenya
- 'Died: Malcolm Galloway, 91, founder of the New Zealand Red Cross

== July 20, 1978 (Thursday) ==
- Three months after the April 25 Saur Revolution in Afghanistan that had toppled the government and had President Mohammad Daoud Khan executed, the rural Afghanis began rebelling against the reforms made by the government of Nur Muhammad Taraki and Hafizullah Amin in the Democratic Republic of Afghanistan. The first outbreak of rebellion took place in the far eastern provinces of Nuristan Province and Kunar, both of which bordered Pakistan.
- Born:
  - Pavel Datsyuk, Russian ice hockey star and captain of the Russian national team who appeared in five consecutive Winter Olympics (2002, 2006, 2010, 2014, 2018), winner of three consecutive Frank J. Selke Trophy awards and four consecutive Lady Byng Memorial Trophy awards in the National Hockey League; in Yekaterinburg (now Sverdlovsk, Russian SFSR, Soviet Union
  - Cédric Heymans, French rugby union player with 59 caps for the France national team; in Brive-la-Gaillarde, Corrèze département

== July 21, 1978 (Friday) ==
- General Juan Pereda, who was declared the winner of the July 9 election in Bolivia despite evidence of massive fraud, was installed as the new President of Bolivia. The Bolivian Army staged a coup d'etat that toppled President Hugo Banzer, who had come to power in a coup in 1971.
- The divorce of Princess Margaret, sister of Queen Elizabeth II of the United Kingdom, from Antony Armstrong-Jones, became final 18 years after they had married, and marked the first royal divorce since 1901.
- Terrorists in Madrid killed two officers of the Spanish Army, killing Brigadier General Juan Sanchez Ramos and his aide, Lieutenant Colonel Jose Antonio Perez, as the two men sat in a car in front of General Sanchez's home. The Basque separatist organization ETA (Euskadi Ta Askatasuna) claimed responsibility for the killings, saying that the Spanish Army was "the axis of fascist repression" in the Basque provinces, although two other terror groups claimed that they had made the killings.
- Born:
  - Josh Hartnett, American film and stage actor known for 40 Days and 40 Nights (2002), Oppenheimer (2023) and Trap (2024); in Saint Paul, Minnesota
  - Kyoko Iwasaki, Japanese swimmer and 1992 Olympic gold medalist, at age 14 in the 200m breaststroke; in Numazu, Shizuoka Prefecture

== July 22, 1978 (Saturday) ==
- Three guards were killed in a riot involving more than 1,000 inmates at the Pontiac Correctional Center, a maximum security prison in the U.S. state of Illinois.
- Born:
  - A. J. Cook (Andrea Joy Cook), Canadian TV actress known for portraying Agent JJ Jareau for more than 15 years on the American crime drama Criminal Minds; in Oshawa, Ontario
  - Dennis Rommedahl, Danish footballer with 126 caps for the Denmark national team; in Copenhagen

== July 23, 1978 (Sunday) ==
- SelecTV, the first pay cable television network to allow its subscribers to pay only for the programs that they selected to watch, was inaugurated in the U.S., starting with the Los Angeles metropolitan area. At its height it had 125,000 subscribers in various locations in the United States, but the network would go bankrupt in 1989.
- Born:
  - Stefanie Sun (stage name for Sng Ee Tze), popular Singaporean singer, songwriter and actress; in Singapore
  - Faisal bin Abdullah Al Saud, Saudi Arabian prince and the son of the late King Abdullah and nephew of the current King Salman; known for being the former administrator of the Saudi Arabian Red Crescent Society, and for being arrested and imprisoned during the "Saudi Arabian purge" in 2017; in Riyadh He is the fifth son of King Abdullah who ruled Saudi Arabia from 2005 to his death in January 2015.
- Died: Dr. Philip Caves, 38, Northern Irish-born Scottish cardiothoracic surgeon known for pioneering the use of the bioptome and transvenous endomyocardial biopsy in the early diagnosis of heart transplant rejection, died of a heart attack while he was playing against an opponent during a game of squash at Helensburgh in Scotland.

== July 24, 1978 (Monday) ==
- In Acapulco, Mexico, Margaret Gardiner of South Africa was crowned Miss Universe.
- Chilean Air Force General Gustavo Leigh, who had been one of the four members of the military junta that took power after the 1973 overthrow of President Salvador Allende, was dismissed by a decree signed by the other junta members, President Augusto Pinochet, Admiral José Toribio Merino, and General César Mendoza. General Leigh was removed from his position as commander-in-chief of the Chilean Air Force and replaced as both commander and junta member by General Fernando Matthei.
- Born: Madeline Miller, American novelist and classical mythology expert, known for The Song of Achilles; in Boston
- Died: Joel Hunt, 72, American football player and coach, inducted into the College Football Hall of Fame

== July 25, 1978 (Tuesday) ==
- Louise Brown became the first human being to be born after conception through in vitro fertilization (IVF), and the original "test tube baby", was delivered at Oldham General Hospital in the British city of Oldham in Greater Manchester. Sir Robert Edwards, who guided the conception of the first human IVF, would be awarded the 2010 Nobel Prize in Physiology or Medicine.
- The Viking 2 orbiter, which had entered orbit around Mars on August 7, 1976, after being launched from the U.S., turned off by NASA after returning almost 16,000 images in more than 700 orbits around Mars.
- Died: Francis Lawrence Keating, American armed robber who teamed with Thomas James Holden to create the Holden-Keating gang that carried out holdups from 1926 to 1932.

== July 26, 1978 (Wednesday) ==
- A man and his two nieces, aged 10 and 15, were killed and another girl seriously injured at the Six Flags over Mid-America amusement park in St. Louis, when a cable car was knocked off of the "Skylift" ride and fell 75 feet (23 m).
- Born:
  - Eve Myles, Welsh TV actress and the female lead in the BBC series Torchwood; in Ystradgynlais, Powys
  - Jehad Muntasser, Libyan footballer with 34 caps for the Libya national team; in Tripoli.
  - Irene Visedo, Spanish TV actress and co-star of the long-running program Cuéntame cómo pasó from 2001 to 2008 and 2015 to 2021; in Madrid
  - Justin Va'a, New Zealand-born rugby union player for the Samoa national team; in Golden Bay Sands.

== July 27, 1978 (Thursday) ==
- In the city of Marathwada in the Indian state of Maharashtra, Hindu residents began a riot after the state government had approved the renaming of Marathwada University to "Ambedkar University", in honor of B. R. Ambedkar, a hero among the Dalit caste, formerly referred to as the "untouchables". At least 27 people, mostly Dalits, were killed and the approval of the name change was revoked. The continued agitation for the renaming of the university would continue until 1994, when a compromise settled on the name "Dr. Babasaheb Ambedkar Marathwada University".

== July 28, 1978 (Friday) ==
- The 100-member Asamblea Constituyente of Peru opened its first session after being assembled by General Francisco Morales Bermudez, the president of Peru, to write a new constitution to facilitate the South American nation's transition back to democracy after a decade of military rule.
- Voters in the Maldives overwhelmingly approved the installation of Maumoon Abdul Gayoom, with almost 93% agreeing that he should be the successor of President Ibrahim Nasir.

== July 29, 1978 (Saturday) ==
- Carlos Menem, formerly the Governor of Argentina's La Rioja Province was released from the Magdalena prison more than two years after he had been arrested on charges of corruption following the 1976 overthrow of President Isabel Perón. In 1989, after the restoration of democracy, Menem would be elected as the President of Argentina and serve for more than 10 years, until 1999. Menem would later be arrested on charges of embezzlement in 2001 and 2013, being placed under house arrest each time.

== July 30, 1978 (Sunday) ==
- On the Japanese island of Okinawa, residents returned to driving on the left side of the road, the law in the rest of Japan, more than 43 years after of having been switched to right-hand traffic when the island had been under American control.
- About 300 demonstrators clashed with police outside a community center in Oxnard, California, where members of the Ku Klux Klan were screening the 1915 film "The Birth of a Nation" to its members. 12 protesters were arrested and 5 police officers were injured.
- Convicted murderers Randy Greenawalt and Gary Gene Tison, both serving life sentences at Florence State Prison in the U.S. state of Arizona, was able to escape with the aid of Tison's three sons, Donald, Ricky and Raymond, who were not searched when they arrived for a visit. Once inside, two of the Tison brothers pulled out a shotgun from a cardboard box they had carried inside. The next day, the escapees murdered a family of four, including two children. After 12 days on the lam, Greenawalt and two of the Tison brothers were captured; Gary Tison fled the scene but was later found dead. Greenawalt would be executed at Florence State Prison in 1997, while the surviving Tyson brothers would have their death sentences commuted to life imprisonment.
- Died: Farnum Fish, 81, American airplane pilot known as "The Boy Aviator" for having been a licensed pilot at age 15.

== July 31, 1978 (Monday) ==
- In Burma (now Myanmar), Operation Nagamin, the forced expulsion of the minority Rohingya people in Arakan State (now Rakhine state) to Bangladesh ended as Burma and Bangladesh signed a repatriation agreement moderated by the United Nations and the International Red Cross. The Burmese military operation had started on February 6 and as many as 250,000 people were forced to flee. After the signing of the pact, more than 180,000 returned from Bangladesh to Burma.
- Royal assent was given in the United Kingdom to the Scotland Act 1978, providing for residents of Scotland to vote on limited self-government. The Act also required that at least 40 percent of Scotland's registered voters had to approve of the change in law, rather than a majority of voters who participated in the referendum. The voting, held on March 1, 1979, showed that 51.6% voted yes, but less than 2.4 million of Scotland's 3.7 million registered voters participated, so the approval was by less than one-third of the electorate.
- North Korean agents kidnapped Kaoru Hasuike and his girlfriend, Yukiko Okudo, from a beach in the town of Kashiwazaki in Japan's Niigata Prefecture, and kept them for the next 24 years. The two, who married and had children, were allowed to visit Japan in 2002 while North Korea held their daughter and son as hostages. Hasuike and Okudo elected to remain in Japan, and the two children would be allowed to leave two years later. Hasuike would later publish a memoir, Abduction and My Decision, recounting his experience.
- Born:
  - Tui T. Sutherland, Venezuelan-born American children's book author known for the Wings of Fire series; in Caracas
  - Will Champion, English drummer for the rock band Coldplay; in Southampton, Hampshire
- Died: Enoch Light, 70, American dance band leader
