= Olukorede Yishau =

Nigerian author and journalist

- Born: 27 June 1978 (age 48); Somolu, Lagos, Lagos State
- Education: Ambrose Alli University
- Occupations: Journalist, author, editor
- Years active: 2006–present
- Employer: The Nation newspaper
- Notable work: In The Name Of Our Father (2018); Vaults of Secrets (2020); and After The End (2024).

Olukorede S. Yishau is a Nigerian writer, editor, journalist and essayist. He is the author of In The Name Of Our Father (2018) and Vaults of Secrets (2020). Yishau has worked as an editor with the Nigerian newspaper The Nation, and was long listed for the 2021 Nigeria Prize for Literature.

Born in Somolu, Lagos State. Yishau was raised in Agege and had his education there, where he excelled academically. He studied journalism at the Nigerian Institute of Journalism, although didn't complete as a result of what he called "a crisis". He also went to Ambrose Alli University and got his degree in mass communication. Yishau has worked in notable news sources including The Sources, Tell Magazine, and currently the associate editor of The Nation, a Nigerian newspaper.

== Life and background ==
=== Youth and education (1978–1996) ===
Yishau was born on 27 June 1978 in Somolu, a Local Government Area of Lagos State, Nigeria. He grew up in Agege, and studied at Ansar-Ud-Deen Grammar School. By 1996, he graduated from secondary school. Yishau proceeded to Nigerian Institute of Journalism and during an interview, he said "he didn't take his last exams due to academic problem in the school" which he called "a crisis", and had a degree in mass communication at Ambrose Alli University, Ekpoma.

=== Career and journalism (1999–2010) ===
Yishau started practicing journalism in 1999 with The Source. It was there he wrote his first book, In The Name Of Our Father. He also worked for Tell Magazine, and is currently an Associate Editor and United States correspondent covering multilateral agencies and others for the Nigerian newspaper, The Nation. He's a published author of four books; his fourth book and second novel, After the end, was published in May 2024.

== Works ==
- Yishau, Olukorede (2018). In The Name Of Our Father. Nigeria: Parresia Publishers. ISBN 9781724961631.
- Yishau, Olukorede (2020). Vaults of Secrets. Nigeria: Parresia Publishers. ISBN 9789789793587.
