= May 1978 =

Month of 1978

<<	May 1978					>>
Su	Mo	Tu	We	Th	Fr	Sa
	1	2	3	4	5	6
7	8	9	10	11	12	13
14	15	16	17	18	19	20
21	22	23	24	25	26	27
28	29	30	31

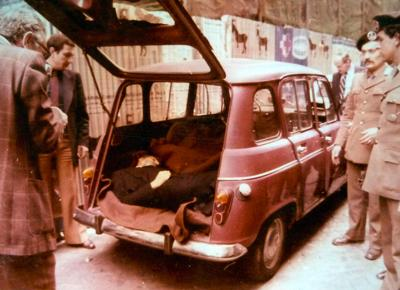
May 9, 1978: Former Italian Prime Minister Aldo Moro found dead, 54 days after being kidnapped by Red Brigades terrorists

The following events occurred in May 1978:

== May 1, 1978 (Monday) ==
- The 35-member Revolutionary Council of the Democratic Republic of Afghanistan, led by Nur Muhammad Taraki, held a meeting three days after Taraki had overthrown the existing government to form a Communist state, in order to select a cabinet of ministers. Taraki was approved as Chairman of the Council, equivalent to a prime minister, with Babrak Karmal as the Deputy Premier.
- The United States allowed the Palestine Liberation Organization (PLO) to open the Palestine Information Office in Washington, D.C., but did not establish diplomatic relations nor recognition of the PLO as the representative of the Palestinian people. The office closed in 1987 after the U.S. Anti-Terrorism Act was signed into law by U.S. President Reagan, in that the PLO was on the United States Department of State list of Foreign Terrorist Organizations.
- An exchange of prisoners was made at the U.S. Embassy in East Berlin as East Germany released Alan Van Norman, a 20-year-old American college student who had been caught trying to help a family escape to West Germany, and the U.S. released Robert Thompson, a former U.S. Air Force clerk turned Soviet spy, who had sold photos of hundreds of secret documents to the Soviet Union. Thompson had been incarcerated in a U.S. federal prison for more than 13 years after being arrested in 1965. Van Norman had been held for more than nine months after being sentenced to 30 months in solitary confinement in an East German jail.
- In Algiers, the Algerian Cup championship of the North African nation's soccer football league was won by 9th-place CR Belcourt over 4th-place USK Alger, on a penalty shootout after the teams were still tied, 0 to 0, following 30 minutes of extra time. Belcourt outscored Alger in the shootout, 2 to 0. The match was played before 80,000 people at the Stade du 5 Juillet.
- William Steinberg, who had been in declining health for several years, conducted a concert of the New York Philharmonic orchestra with an appearance by Isaac Stern as a guest violinist. Steinberg was hospitalized after the concert was over and died 15 days later.
- The U.S. Supreme Court unanimously reversed a decision by the U.S. Fourth Circuit Court of Appeals that had dismissed the indictment of Dr. Jeffrey R. MacDonald for the 1970 murder of his wife and two daughters, striking down the appellate court's finding that Dr. MacDonald had been denied the constitutional right to a speedy trial.
- The Düsseldorf Panther, the oldest semi-pro American football team in Germany, was founded in Düsseldorf in West Germany. In the years that followed, the team would win eight German championships and the 1995 Eurobowl.
- Born:
  - Belal Jadallah, Palestinian journalist and war correspondent; in Gaza City, State of Palestine (killed by Israeli shelling of Gaza, 2023)
  - James Badge Dale, American TV and film actor best known for 24; in New York City
  - Lorene Scafaria, American film and TV director and screenwriter; in Holmdel, New Jersey
- Died:
  - Aram Khachaturian, 74, Soviet-Armenian composer and conductor
  - Sylvia Townsend Warner, 84, British novelist and poet known for Lolly Willowes (1926) and The Corner That Held Them (1948)

== May 2, 1978 (Tuesday) ==
- The Canadian-founded worldwide Greenpeace environmentalist and anti-war organization launched its flagship, Rainbow Warrior, after purchasing and remodeling the British government trawler Sir William Hardy.
- Died: Vong Savang, 46, former Crown Prince of Laos as son of the last monarch, Sisavang Vatthana, died in a Pathet Lao re-education camp.

== May 3, 1978 (Wednesday) ==
- The first use of an electronic messaging system to send an unsolicited message to a large number of recipients for the purpose of commercial advertising, now commonly called spamming, was made when a representative of Digital Equipment Corporation (DEC), Gary Thuerk, sent the same message, simultaneously, to 393 users of ARPANET, the Advanced Research Projects Agency Network. The message informed all recipients that "Digital will be giving a product presentation of the newest members of the DECsystem-2020 family," inviting them to attend sessions on May 9 and May 11 at hotel lobbies in Los Angeles and San Mateo, and invited them to "please feel free to contact the nearest DEC Office for more information about the exciting DECsystem-2020 family." The ARPANET manager responded by noting that the advertisement was "a flagrant violation of the use of ARPANET as the network is to be used for official U.S. government business only," and adding that "appropriate action is being taken to preclude its occurrence again."
- R.S.C. Anderlecht, runner-up for the 1976 Belgian Cup, defeated FK Austria Wien, winner of the 1977 Austrian Cup, 4 to 0, to win the European Cup Winners' Cup before a crowd of 48,679 people at Parc des Princes in Paris.
- The successful stage musical Annie, which had been running in the U.S. on Broadway since April 21, 1977, premiered on London's West End at the Victoria Palace Theatre for the first of 1,485 performances. Andrea McArdle, who had opened the title role on Broadway, appeared for the first 40 performances on the West End before being succeeded by Briton Ann Marie Gwatkin.
- Died: Roberto Pineda, 25, Mexican horse racing jockey, was killed while competing in the U.S. at Pimlico Race Course in Baltimore, when a horse ridden by another jockey, Rudy Turcotte, broke her foreleg and caused a chain reaction with two other horses. Pineda was riding the horse "Easter Bunny Mine" in the second race of the day when Turcotte's horse, Easy Edith, collapsed. Pineda was thrown head-first from Easter Bunny Mine, and two other horses went down in a pileup. Pineda had severe head injuries and died at a nearby hospital.

== May 4, 1978 (Thursday) ==
- The South African Defence Force (SADF) invaded Angola as the first part of Operation Reindeer against SWAPO, the Namibian independence guerrilla organization. The first phase, the Battle of Cassinga, started as an airborne assault on SWAPO positions. Angola's government reported that 624 civilians and combatants were killed, of whom 150 were soldiers from Cuba, and 298 were teenagers and children. Angola then appealed to the United Nations Security Council for intervention.
- Communist activist Henri Curiel, 63, was murdered in Paris.
- Born:
  - Erin Andrews, American sportscaster and television personality; in Lewiston, Maine
  - Daisuke Ono, Japanese voice actor and winner of two Seiyu Awards; in Sakawa, Kōchi Prefecture

== May 5, 1978 (Friday) ==
- Ben Cohen and Jerry Greenfield, both natives of Merrick, New York, who had completed a correspondence course on ice cream making from the Penn State University creamery, opened an ice cream parlor in Burlington, Vermont, with an investment of $12,000, creating Ben & Jerry's, which would become a business with hundreds of locations and products sold in grocery stores.
- The neutral nation of Austria and the Communist nation of Hungary announced jointly that they had agreed to open the border by abolishing requirements for a travel visa to travel between the countries.
- In the Netherlands, Ajax Amsterdam and AZ Alkmaar, who had finished in second and third place, respectively, in the Eredivisie, the highest level of Dutch soccer football, faced each other before 50,000 spectators at the Olympic Stadium in Amsterdam in the finals of the KNVB Cup. Alkmaar won, 1 to 0.
- Born: Ismael El Massoudi, Moroccan-born French professional boxer and WBA welterweight champion 2011 to 2012

== May 6, 1978 (Saturday) ==
- United Nations Security Council Resolution 428 was approved unanimously, 15 to 0, reminding all UN Member States to refrain from using threats and use of force in their international relations, and specifically condemning South Africa for using Namibia (at the time, South-West Africa) as a staging point for Operation Reindeer, an invasion of Angola. The Security Council threatened punitive measures if the South Africa Defence Forces made another armed invasion. The SADF terminated Operation Reindeer four days later.

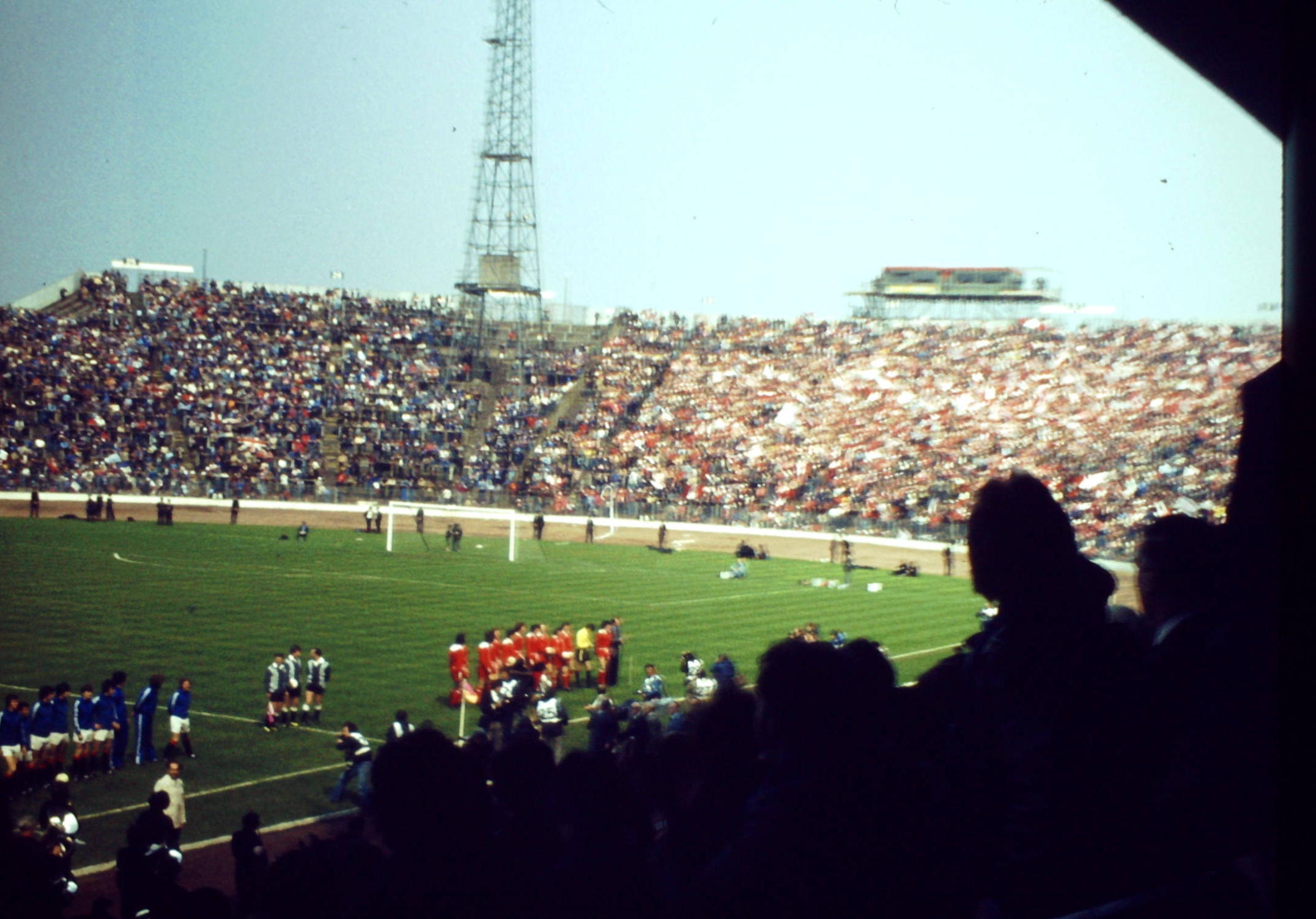
1978 Scottish Cup final

- The Scottish Cup, the championship game of the Scottish Football League tournament, was played before 61,563 people at Hampden Park in Glasgow between Rangers F.C. of Glasgow and Aberdeen F.C., who were first and second, respectively, during the 1977–78 Scottish Premier Division season. Rangers were leading by two goals before an Aberdeen goal in the 85th minute for a final score of Rangers 2, Aberdeen 1.
- In England, Ipswich Town F.C., 18th out of 22 in Football League play (11 win, 13 draws and 18 losses) won the FA Cup, defeating 5th best Arsenal F.C. (21–10–11), 1 to 0 in front of 100,000 fans at Wembley.
- The thoroughbred horse Affirmed, ridden by Steve Cauthen, won the Kentucky Derby, 1 1/4 lengths ahead of Alydar.
- Born: Tony Estanguet, French slalom canoeist and winner of three Olympic gold medals for the men's canoe slalom in 2000, 2004 and 2012; in Pau, Pyrénées-Atlantiques department
- Died: Ethelda Bleibtrey, 76, American Olympic swimmer, winner of 3 gold medals in the 1920 Olympics, later inducted to the International Swimming Hall of Fame

== May 7, 1978 (Sunday) ==
- Former Italian Premier Aldo Moro was informed by his kidnappers that, since the Italian government had refused their final demands to release 13 prisoners, he was going to be killed. Moro was allowed to send a final letter to his wife and wrote, "They have told me that they are going to kill me in a little while, I kiss you for the last time."
- The first episode of the long-running Philippine television variety program GMA Supershow, hosted by German Moreno, was broadcast at noon on the GMA Network. GMA Supershow would run for 978 episodes over more than 18 years before concluding on January 26, 1997.
- Ricardo Cardona of Colombia won the World super bantamweight title of the World Boxing Association by defeating reigning champion Hong Soo-hwan of South Korea in a bout in Seoul. Cardona would hold the title for almost a year before losing to Leo Randolph on May 4, 1980.
- After being denied permission to leave Saudi Arabia for almost six months, and having his U.S. passport taken away because of a contract dispute with Saudi government officials, an American businessman from Texas, John L. McDonald, escaped the country by substituting himself for the contents of a shipping crate that had cleared customs after he had paid for freight transportation at the Dhahran airport. After the crate was sent to freight pickup at an airport in Europe, McDonald, president of Heritage Building Systems International of Houston, climbed out and went to a local U.S. Embassy.

== May 8, 1978 (Monday) ==
- Reinhold Messner of Italy and Peter Habeler of Austria made the first ascent of the world's highest mountain, 29,031-foot (8,849 m) Mount Everest, without supplemental oxygen. The pair brought along oxygen tanks in case of an emergency, and endured tiredness and confusion from hypoxia, but reached the top.
- Norway officially began production from the Frigg gas field, a large source of natural gas, administered by the French company Elf Aquitaine, in the Polar Sea.
- David Berkowitz, the serial killer known as "the Son of Sam", entered a guilty plea to 6 counts of second-degree murder and 7 counts of attempted murder. He was sentenced to six consecutive terms of 25 years in prison for the six murders, but, as a condition of his plea, he was eligible for parole within 25 years.
- Rodrigo Carazo Odio was sworn for a four-year term as the 36th President of Costa Rica.

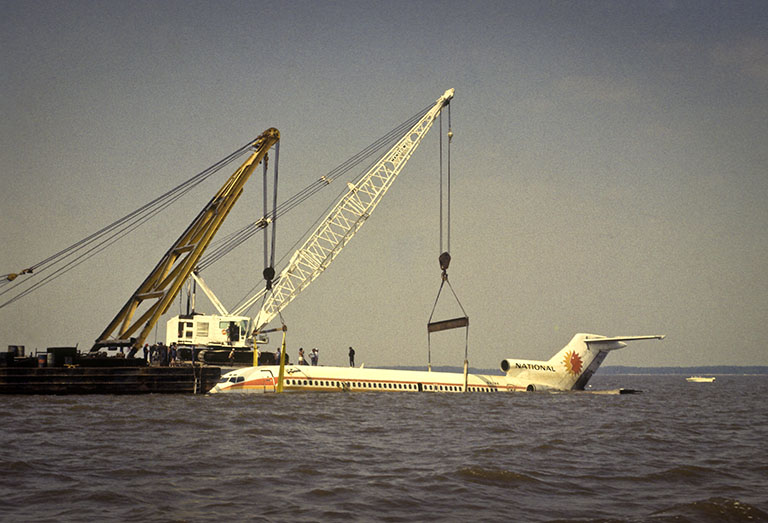
Wreckage of Flight 193 being pulled out of the water

- National Airlines Flight 193, a Boeing 727 flying a multi-stop route from Miami to New Orleans, was approaching its first stop at Pensacola, Florida, in a fog when it descended into Florida's Escambia Bay. Three passengers drowned in the 12-foot (3.7 m) deep waters while trying to exit the aircraft, which was not equipped with life vests or a life raft despite a route that required flying over water. The other 55 were rescued by a nearby tugboat before the airplane sank.
- Born:
  - Cindy Parlow Cone, American soccer player with 158 caps for the U.S. women's national soccer team that won the 1999 Women's World Cup and the 1996 and 2004 Olympic Games, President of the United States Soccer Federation since 2020, inductee to the National Soccer Hall of Fame; in Memphis, Tennessee
  - Lúcio (Lucimar Ferreira da Silva), Brazilian footballer with 105 caps for the Brazil national football team that won the 2002 FIFA World Cup; in Planaltina, Federal District
- Died:
  - Abdool Razack Mohamed, 71, Indian-born politician and former Deputy Prime Minister of Mauritius from 1968 to 1976
  - Duncan Grant, 93, Scottish painter
  - Eileen Crowe, 79, Irish film actress known for being the co-star (with Walter Macken) of Home Is the Hero

== May 9, 1978 (Tuesday) ==
- At 1:30 in the afternoon local time in Rome (1130 UTC), the body of former Italian prime minister Aldo Moro, who had been kidnapped by the Red Brigades terrorist organization on March 16, was found in a car parked on Rome's Via Michelangelo Caetani. Moro's death came after the Italian government refused to negotiate or to meet the demand that 16 jailed prisoners be released. Moro, 61, had served as prime minister twice, from 1963 to 1968 and from 1974 to 1976.
- David Cook of England became the first pilot to cross the English Channel while flying a hang glider. He used a Volmer VJ-23 Swingwing glider, with a small motor.
- A group of 30 troops from the Soviet Union crossed the Ussuri River in patrol boats and entered the People's Republic of China, according to a protest by China's Vice Foreign Minister, Yu Chan, to the Soviet ambassador in Beijing, Vasily Tolstikov. The Chinese charged that the troops landed at the Yueyapao District of Heilongjiang Province, and had attempted to drag 14 civilian hostages to the river side before villagers pursued the invaders and forced the hostages' release. The Soviets admitted three days later that they had crossed into China, and claimed it was an error, but apologized for the incident.
- Britain's House of Commons narrowly voted to reject the Labour Party government's proposal to raise taxes, with 304 in favor but 312 against. A further setback came the next day when Tories and Liberals combined with other opposition parties, 288 to 286, to raise the threshold for qualifying for a higher tax bracket.
- By a margin of more than 4 to 1, voters in the U.S. city of Wichita, Kansas, overwhelmingly voted to repeal the city's ordinance, passed in September, that had prohibited discrimination against gay and lesbian people. The final count was 47,246 to repeal and only 10,005 to retain the law.
- India's premier soccer football tournament, the Indian Federation Cup, ended with East Bengal FC and Mohun Bagan FC, both based in Calcutta (now spelled Kolkata), being declared joint champions. On May 7, the two had played to a 0 to 0 draw at Jawaharlal Nehru Stadium in Coimbatore, with the score unchanged after extra time. In the rematch, the result was again a scoreless draw after extra time.
- Born: Marwan al-Shehhi, Emirati terrorist who hijacked and piloted United Airlines Flight 175 into the South Tower of the World Trade Center on September 11, 2001, killing all 65 people aboard the Boeing 767 jet and 630 people in the building; in Al Qusaidat, Ras Al Khaimah, United Arab Emirates (d. 2001)
- Died:
  - Aldo Moro, 61, former Prime Minister of Italy from 1963 to 1968 and 1974 to 1976, was assassinated by kidnappers.
  - Giuseppe "Pepino" Impastato, 30, Italian politician and a candidate for office in the city of Cinisi, was killed by a hitman from the Italian Mafia, after which an explosive charge was placed beneath his body to give the appearance that he had died accidentally while attempting to bomb a railway line.
  - Miguel Ángel Cárcano, 88, Argentine Minister of Foreign Affairs 1961 to 1962

== May 10, 1978 (Wednesday) ==
- Playing at Wembley Stadium in England, the 1977 English League champion, Liverpool F.C., defeated the 1977 Belgian League champ, Club Brugge KV of Bruges, 1 to 0, to win the European Cup in front of 92,500 fans.
- For the first time in more than 400 years, a member of the British royal family filed for a divorce. Princess Margaret, sister of Queen Elizabeth II and at one time third in line for the throne, filed proceedings against her husband, Lord Snowdon, after two years of separation. The previous royal divorce had happened in 1539, when King Henry VIII ended his marriage with Anne of Cleves.
- Japan and China announced that they had reached an agreement toward resolving the Senkaku Islands dispute.
- Born:
  - Kenan Thompson, African-American actor and comedian, member of the cast of Saturday Night Live for 21 seasons from 2003 to the present, and the first cast member born after the 1975 premiere of SNL; in Columbus, Ohio
  - Sunitha Upadrashta, Indian singer and film actress in Telugu cinema, winner of nine Nandi Awards; in Vijayawada, Andhra Pradesh
- Died: Hugh Ernest Butler FRSE MRIA FRAS, 61, Welsh astronomer

== May 11, 1978 (Thursday) ==
- The "Truth Criterion Controversy" began in the People's Republic of China as a debate on reforming China's policies that had been implemented during the rule of the late Chairman Mao Zedong and the Gang of Four. The editorial "Practice sets the only Standard to Examine Truth", written by philosophy teacher Hu Fuming, and edited by Vice Premier Deng Xiaoping and future Party Chairman Hu Yaobang, was published in the Communist Party Central Committee newspaper Guangming Daily, then reprinted the next day in the Communist Party official newspaper, People's Daily, as a direct criticism of Chairman Hua Guofeng's 1977 declaration that the Party should "unswervingly follow whatever instructions Chairman Mao gave." On December 22, the Communist Central Committee sided with Deng and with Hu Fuming and Hu Yaobang, implementing the "Four Modernizations" as China's policy for improvement of agriculture, industry, defense and technology.
- USMC Colonel Margaret A. Brewer was promoted to the rank of brigadier general, becoming the first woman to serve as a general in the United States Marine Corps. By July 1978, the standard of living was increasing and consumers were purchasing goods not previously available.
- A brief civil war began in the African nation of Zaire. Commanded by Nathaniel Mbumba, an army of 6,500 separatists from the Congolese National Liberation Front (FLNC) invaded the Shaba Province (now the Katanga Province in the southwest part of the Democratic Republic of the Congo), coming across the border from Angola in an attempt to create a separate nation. Within two days, the FLNC captured the mining city of Kolwezi and then sought out the 1,800 European residents of the province to hold as hostages. The invasion prompted a response from France, Belgium, Morocco and the United States in providing aid to Zaire and would end in June.
- West German terrorist Stefan Wisniewski of the Red Army Faction was arrested by French gendarmes at the Orly Airport in Paris, then extradited back to Germany to face charges for the 1977 murder of West German businessman Hanns Martin Schleyer. Sentenced to life imprisonment, Wisniewski would be paroled in 1999 after more than 20 years of incarceration.
- The opera Griselda, composed in 1735 by Antonio Vivaldi, was given its first performance in more than a century, staged at the English Bach Festival and conducted by John Eliot Gardiner.
- South Africa ended Operation Reindeer, withdrawing the last of its troops from Angola by 10:00 in the morning local time.
- Born:
  - Laetitia Casta, French supermodel and actress; in Pont-Audemer, Eure département
  - Judy Ann Santos, Filipino film actress, winner of three FAMAS Awards; in Manila

== May 12, 1978 (Friday) ==
- In Zaire, now the Democratic Republic of Congo, a group of 4,000 rebels occupied the city of Kolwezi, the mining center of the province of Shaba, and were supplemented by troops from Cuba. The Zairean government asked the U.S., France and Belgium to restore order.
- In a suburb of Ankara, in Turkey, a fire killed 40 people in a six-story building that housed a shopping center on the bottom floor and a vocational school on upper floors. There were about 500 in the building when the fire broke out in a shoe store, and most were customers able to escape from the first floor below. Ladders that could reach to upper floors rescued 250 more people. A dozen people from the school reached the roof and were evacuated by a mechanical ladder, but the gears failed and the ladder "swayed away from other screaming victims," and an attempt to rescue other people by helicopter failed.
- The National Oceanic and Atmospheric Administration (NOAA), the U.S. agency in charge of meteorology, announced that it would end the practice of solely using female names for storms and hurricanes, and begin using male and female identifications for tropical storms in the Eastern Pacific immediately, and effective in 1979 for those in the Atlantic Ocean. After Tropical Storm "Aletta", the next storm would be identified as "Bud".
- Born:
  - Hossein Rezazadeh, Iranian weightlifter, winner of Olympic gold medals in 2000 and 2004, and four world championships in 2002, 2003, 2005 and 2006 in the 105-kilogram (231 lb) category; in Ardabil
  - Jason Biggs, American film and TV actor best known for the 1999 film American Pie and its sequels; in Pompton Plains, New Jersey
  - Malin Åkerman, Swedish-born U.S. actress known for Watchmen and 27 Dresses; in Stockholm
- Died:
  - Vasili Merkuryev, 74, Soviet Russian stage and film actor known for the 1954 adventure comedy True Friends (Vernye druz'ya)
  - Myron M. Kinley, 81, American oil well firefighter
  - Louis Zukofsky, 74, American poet and theorist

== May 13, 1978 (Saturday) ==
- A group of mercenaries, led by Bob Denard, ousted President Ali Soilih in the Comoros; ten local soldiers were killed and Denard formed a new government.
- The Challenge Cup of England's Rugby Football League was won before 96,000 fans at Wembley as Leeds beat St Helens, 14 to 12.
- Born: Barry Zito, American Major League Baseball pitcher and 2002 winner of the AL Cy Young Award; in Las Vegas
- Died:
  - Sisavang Vatthana, 70, the last King of Laos, who reigned from 1959 until his forced abdication in 1975, reportedly died of malaria while imprisoned in Xam Neua by the ruling Communist government. The only surviving member of the royal family, Sisavang's son Sauryavong Savang, became the pretender to the throne until his own death in 2018.
  - Alby Roberts, 68, New Zealand cricketer

== May 14, 1978 (Sunday) ==
- Franz Oppurg of Austria became the first person to climb Mount Everest by himself. Obburg and Josl Knoll had been partnered and reached the last camp before the summit when they discovered that they only had one oxygen mask suitable for climbing further, so Knoll urged Oppurg to complete the ascent. After reaching the South Summit of Everest, Oppurg found that he did not have enough bottled oxygen to ascend further and to return to the camp but continued after discovering an unused oxygen bottle from a previous French expedition.
- A presidential election was held in the nation of Upper Volta (now Burkina Faso) for the first time since 1965. General Sangoulé Lamizana, who had overthrown the elected president in 1966, received 42% of the vote as the leader among four candidates on the ballot. Because nobody had a majority of the votes, General Lamizana and second-place finisher Macaire Ouédraogo were the two choices in a runoff election two weeks later.
- Born: Elisa Togut, Italian women's volleyball player and the MVP of the 2002 World Championship; in Gorizia
- Died: Bill Lear, 75, American inventor who founded the Learjet company, manufacturer of smaller jet aircraft for use by businesses, and helped develop the car radio and the 8-track cartridge audio system, died of leukemia.

== May 15, 1978 (Monday) ==
- The first outlet of the Timezone chain of family entertainment centers, now operating in seven south Asian nations (Australia, New Zealand, India, Singapore, the Philippines, Indonesia and Vietnam), was opened by founder Malcolm Steinberg in Perth, Western Australia.
- The Iranian Army brutally suppressed a riot by students of the University of Tehran in Tabriz.
- The Philippine government, which had previously told the world about the Tasaday people on Mindanao in 1971, announced that a new group of "Stone Age" people, the "Taotbato", had been found living in the crater of an extinct volcano on an island in the Palawan province. Other anthropologists dismissed the claim that the Taotbato were an important find, with one quoted as saying "That's nonsense. There's nothing unusual about the behavior of these people. They're the same as mountain tribes all over the country."
- Born:
  - Dwayne De Rosario, Canadian soccer player with 81 caps for the national team as well as being the 2011 Major League Soccer MVP; in Scarborough, Ontario
  - Caroline Dhavernas, French-Canadian TV actress known for Hannibal on NBC and for Wonderfalls on Fox; in Montreal
  - Krzysztof Ignaczak, Polish volleyball player with 321 caps for the Poland national team; in Wałbrzych
- Died: Sir Robert Menzies KT AK CH QC FAA FRS, 83, Prime Minister of Australia 1939 to 1941 and 1949 to 1966

== May 16, 1978 (Tuesday) ==
- Nationwide voting was held in the Dominican Republic for the President and for both houses of the Dominican Republic Congress. Early returns showed President Joaquín Balaguer, who had held power since 1966, to be losing to opposition candidate Antonio Guzmán, and the army responded the next day. Guzman's Partido Revolucionario Dominicano (PRD) won 48 of the 91 seats in the House of Deputies and 16 of the 27 seats in the Dominican Republic Senate.
- The Motorcycle Riders Association of Australia (MRAA), a public service organization to promote road safety, fair laws, and goodwill of Australian motorcyclists, was founded in Melbourne by Chris Stalwell, Mark Conner and Damien Codognotto.
- Born:
  - Lionel Scaloni, Argentine footballer and manager of the Argentina national football team since 2018, known for guiding Argentina to victory in the 2022 FIFA World Cup; in Pujato, Santa Fe Province
  - Sandeep Pathak, Indian film actor known for Vitthal Maza Sobati and Dhishkyaoon; in Majalgaon, Maharashtra state
  - Ayman Hariri, Lebanese businessman, CEO and co-founder of the Vero company; in Riyadh, Saudi Arabia
  - Shinji Aoba, Japanese arsonist convicted of 36 counts of murder for setting the Kyoto Animation studios on fire in 2019; in Urawa, Saitama prefecture
- Died:
  - William Steinberg, 78, German-born American conductor and composer, died 15 days after conducting the New York Philharmonic in concert.
  - Ignatius Pi Shu-shih (Pi Jinxu), 81, Chinese Catholic priest and Archbishop of Shenyang, founder in 1957 of the China's Catholic Patriotic Association with the acknowledgment of the Chinese Communist Party
  - A. E. Smith, 98, English-born Australian violin maker

== May 17, 1978 (Wednesday) ==
- The Army of the Dominican Republic halted the counting of ballots in the national elections after it was clear that President Balaguer and his party were losing by a 2 to 1 margin. Balaguer's opponent, Antonio Guzman, declared himself to be the winner and asked U.S. President Carter to make sure that the victory was recognized. The next day, counting of the votes resumed and Balaguer's Reformist Party proclaimed itself to be leading in the votes. Balaguer relented two days later and ordered the withdrawal of the soldiers from voting sites.
- Charlie Chaplin's coffin was found buried 2 feet (0.61 m) deep in a cornfield 15 kilometres (9.3 mi) from the Swiss cemetery from which it was stolen more than two months earlier. On March 2, Chaplin's body had been stolen from the family center at Corsier, near Lake Geneva. Police had arrested the first of two suspects after staking out 200 public telephones in Lausanne.
- Born: Imran Khan, Indian computer programmer and web application developer; in Khareda, Rajasthan state
- Died:
  - Selwyn Lloyd, 73, English politician who served as Speaker of the House of Commons from 1971 to 1976, and previously as Chancellor of the Exchequer, 1963–1964, and Secretary of State for Foreign Affairs, 1955-1960
  - Armin T. Wegner, 91, German human rights activist, known for documenting the Armenian genocide while stationed in the Ottoman Empire during World War I, and later for being jailed in 1933 for publicly denouncing Nazi Germany's persecution of Jews.

== May 18, 1978 (Thursday) ==
- Soviet dissident Yuri Orlov was sentenced to seven years at hard labor, to be followed by five years of internal exile for distributing "counterrevolutionary material".
- Sarajevo was selected by the International Olympic Committee (IOC) to host the 1984 Winter Olympics, on the second round of balloting. On the first round, Sarajevo (in Yugoslavia), Sapporo (in Japan) and Gothenburg (in Sweden) were all competing, with no team receiving the necessary 38 votes out of 75, and Sapporo (which hosted in 1972) having a plurality against Sarajevo, 33 to 31. With the second round limited to the top two vote-getters, Sarajevo edged Sapporo, 39 votes to 36.
- At the same IOC meeting, Los Angeles (in the U.S.) was selected to host the 1984 Summer Olympics, after the only other bidder, Tehran (in Iran), withdrew because of ongoing political violence. The award to Los Angeles was conditioned upon the city signing a contract, by July 1, to take full financial responsibility for the Summer Games.
- Voters across South Korea voted for the 2,581 electors who would meet on July 6 to formally re-elect President Park Chung-hee. All but four of the electors, all of whom were pledged in advance to President Park, were approved.
- Born:
  - Ricardo Carvalho, Portuguese footballer with 89 caps for the national team; in Amarante
  - Cynthia Wu (Wu Hsin-ying), Taiwanese business executive and politician, known for being the vice-presidential nominee of the Taiwan People's Party as running mate of Ko Wen-je in the 2024 Taiwanese presidential election
- Died:
  - Wei Tao-ming, 78, Taiwan politician who served as the Republic of China's Ambassador to the U.S. from 1942 to 1946, then as the first Chairman of the Taiwan Provincial Government from 1947 to 1949 as the Chinese Communist Revolution, and finally as the Foreign Minister of Taiwan from 1966 to 1971
  - Bashar Rashid, 29, former Iraqi footballer who had played for the Iraq national team during the 1974 FIFA World Cup qualifications, was executed after being convicted of having been a member of the outlawed Iraqi Communist Party.

== May 19, 1978 (Friday) ==
- Colonel Philippe Erulin, commander of the 2nd Foreign Parachute Regiment of the French Foreign Legion, led 700 paratroopers in landing in Kolwezi in the African nation of Zaire, to rescue a group of 2,000 Europeans in the middle of the Shaba II civil war. Another 1,000 Belgian troops arrived from Kamina, 130 miles (210 km) from Kolwezi. Upon the paratroopers arrival, they found that 44 white foreign hostages had already been shot to death. The remaining hostages were freed the next day as French and Belgian armies recaptured Kolwezi and the Zairean rebels retreated. At that time, the estimate of dead foreigners had increased to 100, with 60 other foreigners carried off as hostages during the retreat.
- Aeroflot Flight 6709 within the Soviet Union, with 134 people on board, lost power while flying from Baku in the Azerbaijani SSR toward Leningrad in the Russian SFSR. The pilots were able to land the Tupolev Tu-154B in a potato field at Maksatikha in Russia, with all but four of the people on board surviving the impact and a subsequent fire.
- Two Soviet Georgian dissidents, writer Zviad Gamsakhurdia and musicologist Merab Kostava, both founders of the Georgian Helsinki Group, were sentenced to three years at hard labor and two more years of internal exile.
- Born: Muttath Suresh, Indian footballer with 70 caps for the India national team; in Edattummal, Kasaragod district, Kerala state
- Died: Moses Kotane, 72, Secretary-General of the South African Communist Party since 1939, in exile in the Soviet Union.

== May 20, 1978 (Saturday) ==
- At the age of 53, Mavis Hutchinson of South Africa, referred to in the press as "The Galloping Granny", became the first woman to run across the continental United States as she arrived in front of New York City Hall. She had started at Los Angeles City Hall in California on March 12, and began running eastward while her support crew, led by her husband Ernie Hutchison, provided supplies during the journey. She covered 2,908 miles (4,680 km) in 69 days, two hours and 40 minutes.
- The Pioneer Venus Orbiter was launched from the United States with multiple instruments to study the planet Venus, including a surface radar mapper, an infrared radiometer, an ultraviolet spectrometer, a magnetometer, and a cloud photopolarimeter. The probe entered orbit around Venus on December 4 and would return data for almost 14 years.
- The private West German rocket manufacturer OTRAG, founded in 1974, made its second, and last, successful launch from the African nation of Zaire in three attempts. None of the OTRAG rockets reached orbit, but the first one attained an altitude of 12,000 metres (7.5 mi) on May 17, 1977, and the second reached 9,000 metres (5.6 mi).
- Chiang Ching-kuo was inaugurated on the island of Taiwan as the new President of the Republic of China, succeeding Yen Chia-kan, who had served the remainder of the term of Chiang Kai-shek, who had died on April 6, 1975. The new president was sworn in immediately after being elected unanimously by Taiwan's national electoral college.
- The Preakness Stakes, second leg of the Triple Crown of American horse racing, was run at the Pimlico Race Track in Maryland, near Baltimore. As with the Kentucky Derby two weeks earlier, Affirmed finished first and Alydar finished second, while Believe It came in third.
- Born: Mike Flanagan, American filmmaker known primarily for horror films, including Oculus; in Salem, Massachusetts
- Died:
  - Ernest Cadine, 84, French weightlifter, 1920 Olympic gold medalist
  - P. S. Subrahmanya Sastri, 87, Indian Sanskrit scholar

== May 21, 1978 (Sunday) ==
- U.S. National Security Adviser Zbigniew Brzezinski met privately in Beijing with Huang Hua, Foreign Minister of the People's Republic of China, and announced that he was authorized by U.S. President Jimmy Carter to accept the three conditions set by Beijing for normalization of diplomatic relations, specifically for the U.S. to sever its relationship with Taiwan, including the withdrawal of U.S. troops and severing its diplomatic and military pacts with the Taiwanese government, provided that the U.S. would be able to announce that China would resolve its issues with Taiwan peacefully.
- Near Tokyo, the Narita International Airport began operations after delays caused by sabotage carried out by protesters. At 8:02 in the morning local time, a Japan Air Lines (JAL) DC-8 cargo jet arrived at Narita from Los Angeles, becoming the first commercial aircraft to land. The first passenger plane arrived at 12:03 p.m. from Moscow, with 82 travelers on board. Takeoffs were scheduled for the next day.
- In the Soviet Union, the Republican Party of Georgia (Sakartvelos Respublikuri Partia) was founded clandestinely by four independence activists in the Georgian Soviet Socialist Republic, Vakhtang Dzabiradze, Vakhtang Shonia, Levan Berdzenishvili and David Berdzenishvili, with a goal of an independent Georgian nation with guarantees of human rights and a free market economy. The four Georgians would be arrested and jailed in 1983 for anti-Soviet activity, then released in time to participate in the first free elections of the Republic of Georgia.
- Exiled Comoros President Ahmed Abdallah returned to the capital at Moroni, along with former Vice-president Muhammad Ahmad returned to the Comoros, after Ali Soilih had overthrown him in a coup d'état on May 12.

== May 22, 1978 (Monday) ==
- Italy's President Giovanni Leone signed Law No. 194 of 22 May 1978, legalizing abortion in Italy after the authorizing act was passed by the Italian Senate, 160 to 148, on May 18. The act had previously been passed by the Chamber of Deputies, 308 to 275, and permitted abortion within the first 90 days of pregnancy for any woman over 18 years old who believed that childbirth would endanger her physical or mental health.
- The Avco Cup, best-4-of-7 championship of the World Hockey Association, was won in a 4 games to 0 sweep by the Winnipeg Jets (now the Arizona Coyotes) over the New England Whalers at Hartford, Connecticut. The Whalers, who had defeated the Jets 4 to 1, 5 to 2, and 10 to 2, won the final game, 5 to 3.
- The Minnesota Zoo, one of only two state-supported zoos in the United States (the other being the North Carolina Zoo), opened in Apple Valley, Minnesota, as the Minnesota Zoological Garden.
- The mistaken opening of a valve on the U.S. Navy submarine USS Puffer caused as much as 100 US gallons (380 L; 83 imp gal) of radioactive water to be released into a drydock at Puget Sound Naval Shipyard at Bremerton, Washington.
- Born:
  - Katie Price (stage name for Katrina Infield), English supermodel known as "Jordan", singer, children's book author and television personality; in Brighton, East Sussex
  - Ginnifer Goodwin (born Jennifer Michelle Goodwin), American TV actress known for being the star of the ABC series Once Upon a Time; in Memphis, Tennessee
- Died:
  - Joseph Colombo, 54, American gangster who was boss of the Colombo crime family of New York and was paralyzed in 1971 after an assassination attempt, died of a cardiac arrest.
  - U.S. Navy Admiral Aubrey Fitch, 94, former Superintendent of the U.S. Naval Academy

== May 23, 1978 (Tuesday) ==
- Heng Samrin, who would become the President of Democratic Kampuchea (later Cambodia) in 1979 and stop the genocide that had started in 1975, was saved from certain arrest and execution by a high-ranking official of the ruling Kampuchean Communist Party, So Phim. Heng had been taken into custody on the order of a higher-ranking official, Ke Pauk. So Phim, the director of Kampuchea's East Zone, intervened by summoning Heng to his office and then transferring him to the Prey Veng province, on the border with Vietnam, where Heng escaped to safety. Eleven days later, when Ke Pauk discovered the overriding of the arrest order, So Phim committed suicide to avoid capture, torture and execution.
- Paul Southwell became the new Premier of Saint Kitts and Nevis, two Caribbean islands that had been elevated to the autonomous status of part of the West Indies Associated States in 1967, before becoming an independent nation in 1983. Southwell, who had been the Chief Minister of the colony of Saint Kitts and Nevis, succeeded Premier Robert Llewellyn Bradshaw, 61, who had died in office the same day. Southwell himself would die after slightly less than a year, on May 18, 1979.
- The crash of a test flight of a Soviet Tupolev Tu-144D supersonic passenger jet halted flights completely. A crew of eight was making the final test before the jet's scheduled delivery to the Soviet Union national airline, Aeroflot and departed Moscow's Zhukovsky Airport. A fuel line had ruptured and caused eight tons of fuel to leak into the Tu-144's right wing, but the flight engineers concluded that the instrument reading was incorrect and failed to report the problem to the flight captain. Half an hour later, when the Tu-144 was at an altitude of 3,000 metres (9,800 ft) a fire broke out and the two right-side engines were shut down. Within six minutes, the crew made a belly landing in a field near Kladkovo, and two flight engineers were killed. The last Tu-144 flight took place two weeks later, June 6. The Soviets confirmed the Tu-144 crash five months after it happened. By then, the Tu-144 program had been canceled.
- Bill Walton of the Portland Trail Blazers was named the National Basketball Association regular season MVP.

== May 24, 1978 (Wednesday) ==
- An airplane crash killed Kenya's former Minister of Agriculture, Bruce McKenzie, 59, along with the pilot and two other people, after McKenzie had left a meeting with Uganda's President Idi Amin. A bomb exploded on the twin-engine Piper Aztec 23 airplane as it was flying back to the Kenyan capital of Nairobi after departing from the airport at Entebbe.
- The hijacking of a helicopter in an attempt to free two inmates of the U.S. federal penitentiary near Marion, Illinois, was thwarted after the hijacker, Barbara Ann Oswald, was shot and killed by her hostage, Allen Barklage. Oswald had been attempting to free her friend, Garrett Brock Trapnell, from incarceration by seizing a charter helicopter at an airport near St. Louis and ordering Barklage to land inside the prison yard to pick up Trapnell. Barklage landed the helicopter inside the yard, wrestled the gun away from Oswald, and then shot her as she attempted to flee.
- HNK Rijeka of SR Croatia defeated KF Trepça of the Socialist Autonomous Province of Kosovo within SR Croatia after extra time to win the Marshal Tito Cup, the soccer football championship of the nation of Yugoslavia.
- The Cup of the Soviet Army, the soccer football tournament championship of Bulgaria, was played in front of 40,000 people at Vasil Levski National Stadium in Sofia. Marek Dupnitsa defeated CSKA Sofia, the Bulgarian Army team, 1 to 0.
- Died: Cyrille Adoula, 56, the first Prime Minister of the Republic of the Congo from its independence in 1961 until his resignation in 1964, died in Switzerland, where he was receiving medical treatment.

== May 25, 1978 (Thursday) ==
- The protest occupation of Bastion Point by 222 members of New Zealand's Māori people was forcibly ended after 506 days by 800 police, with the assistance of the New Zealand Army. Led by Joe Hawke, the protest had started on January 5, 1977, two days before construction was to have started for high-income housing. A new government would return Takaparawhau/Baston Point to the Māoris in 1988.
- The first attack of the Unabomber took place when a mail bomb exploded at a campus police building of Northwestern University in Evanston, Illinois, injuring a security guard. Over the next 17 years, 26 people would be injured, three of them fatally, by the Unabomber until he was arrested and identified as former University of California mathematics professor Ted Kaczynski.
- The Montreal Canadiens defeated the Boston Bruins, four games to two, to win the National Hockey League's Stanley Cup.
- Died: Xhafer Deva, 74, Albanian politician who partially collaborated with the Nazi occupiers of Albania during World War II and served as the Internal Affairs Minister and police agencies, died in San Francisco in the U.S. after having been recruited by the Central Intelligence Agency in 1956. Despite collaborating with the Nazi occupation, Deva had successfully resisted Nazi requests for lists of Albanian Jews or the relocation of Jews into a single location.

== May 26, 1978 (Friday) ==
- The first legal gambling casino in the eastern United States opened at 10:00 in the morning, in Atlantic City, New Jersey, with the debut of the addition of the casino and a theater to the newly remodeled Resorts International Hotel. Singer Steve Lawrence, who was performing at the hotel's Super Star Theater with his wife, Eydie Gormé, opened the gambling era in New Jersey by throwing the first roll of the dice at one of the craps tables. The success of the casino in New Jersey— at the time, the only U.S. state other than Nevada to legalize casino gambling— would be followed by the loosening of laws against gambling in the rest of the United States in the 1980s and 1990s.
- The criminal penalties against adultery were repealed in Spain with the elimination of Articles 449 and 452 of the Spanish penal code. The law, enacted in 1963, provided for incarceration for a married woman who had sexual relations with a man other than her husband, for terms ranging from six months to six years; a married man, on the other hand, had been permitted to have sex with a mistress other than his wife, even within the family home. The 1963 law had been an improvement over the previous rule which legalized revenge murder if a husband caught his wife in bed with another man, with the killing of the wife and her lover being permissible.
- Born:
  - Laurence Fox, English television actor best known for the ITV detective programme Lewis; in Leeds, West Yorkshire
  - Benji Gregory, American child actor known for the American TV situation comedy ALF in the 1980s; in Los Angeles (died of heatstroke, 2024)
- Died:
  - Tamara Karsavina, 93, Russian-born prima ballerina for the Imperial Russian Ballet and the Ballets Russes, who later fled to London and became one of the founders of The Royal Ballet and the Royal Academy of Dance
  - Jorge Icaza Coronel, 71, Ecuadorean novelist known for the 1934 novel Huasipungo

== May 27, 1978 (Saturday) ==
- In West Berlin, two members of the 2 June Movement in West Germany, Inge Viett and Nabil Harb, helped terrorist Till Meyer escape from the medium security Moabit Correctional Facility. The three escaped by train to East Berlin and then through East Germany to Bulgaria. Although Bulgaria was a Communist nation like East Germany, Bulgarian police and West German anti-terrorist detectives worked together to arrest Meyer and three other suspects on June 20, and Bulgaria then allowed for his extradition back to West Germany for trial the next day.

== May 28, 1978 (Sunday) ==
- In the second round of voting in the presidential election in the Republic of Upper Volta (now Burkina Faso), President Sangoulé Lamizana defeated challenger Macaire Ouédraogo. Neither Lamizana nor Ouédraogo had received a majority in the first round of voting, held on May 14.
- Voting was held for the 120-seat National Assembly in the West African nation of Cameroon, a republic with only one legal political party. Voting had taken place earlier in a race with 2,618 candidates, all members of the Cameroonian National Union (CNU), competing for the 120 seats. The May 28 vote was a yes-or-no approval for the individual nominees.
- Voting was held for all 60 seats of the Grand and General Council in the tiny nation of San Marino, with slightly more than 15,000 voters participating. With 31 seats needed for a majority, the Sammarinese Christian Democratic Party came closest, with 26 seats, followed by the Sammarinese Communist Party with 16. The Communists formed a coalition with the Socialists and the Unitary Socialist Party with 31 seats.
- Al Unser won the Indianapolis 500, finishing only eight seconds ahead of Tom Sneva. The win was Unser's third Indianapolis victory overall.
- Darrell Waltrip won the World 600 stock car race, defeating Donnie Allison by only two seconds.
- The price of mailing a letter in the U.S. increased from 13 cents to 15 cents.
- Born:
  - Gulshan Devaiah, Indian film star in Bollywood film, 2020 Screen Awards winner for Best Supporting Actor for the action comedy Mard Ko Dard Nahi Hota (The Man Who Feels No Pain), co-star of the romance 8 A.M. Metro; in Bengaluru, Karnataka state
  - Jake Johnson (stage name for Mark Weinberger), American comedian and TV and film actor known for being the co-star of New Girl for seven seasons on Fox; in Evanston, Illinois
  - Ehab Bessaiso, Palestinian poet and politician, spokesman in Israel's West Bank for the Palestinian Authority and its Minister of Culture from 2015 to 2019; in Gaza City, Gaza Strip, Israel
- Died:
  - Arthur Brough (stage name for Frederick Arthur Baker), 73, British actor best known for the BBC sitcom Are You Being Served?
  - Ben Carré, 94, French-born American set designer for films

== May 29, 1978 (Monday) ==
- At least 30 protesters were killed in Guatemala, and perhaps as many as 106, in the town of Panzós after Guatemalan Mayan peasants traveled from the villages of Cahaboncito, Semococh, Rubetzul, Canguachá, Sepacay, Moyagua, and La Soledad to state their claims for land confiscated from their ancestors by the Spanish colonists.
- The price of mailing a letter in the United States increased from 13 cents to 15 cents, after the U.S. Postal Service had voted on May 19 to approve the increase.
- At Yorkville, Illinois, in the U.S., the new radar equipment of Project NIMROD (Northern Illinois Meteorological Research On Downburst) made the first recording of a radar image of a microburst, using the CP-3 Doppler weather radar.
- Yitzhak Navon took office as the fifth president of Israel, a largely ceremonial office.
- The Cape Verde national football team, created shortly after the Cape Verde islands became an independent nation, played their first international game, losing to Guinea, 1 to 0.
- Born: Sébastien Grosjean, French professional tennis player who was ranked fourth-best in the world in 2002, but never advanced further than the semi-finals in a Grand Slam tournament; in Marseille
- Died:
  - Sy Bartlett (born Sacha Baraniev), 77, Ukrainian-born American novelist, screenwriter, and producer
  - Yury Dombrovsky, 69, Russian writer and dissident who spent 18 years in prison and in internal exile in the Soviet Union.
  - Nazli Sabri, 83, former queen consort of Egypt as wife of King Fuad I from 1919 to 1936

== May 30, 1978 (Tuesday) ==
- The leader of the Church of Jesus Christ of Latter-day Saints, more commonly referred to as "the Mormons", informed his two chief advisors that it was time for the LDS Church to reverse a policy that had excluded, worldwide, persons of black African descent from ordination to the priesthood. The Revelation on Priesthood, written by LDS President Spencer W. Kimball, was formally approved by Kimball's two counselors and the 10 other members of the Quorum of the Twelve Apostles on June 1. The change was not formally announced until June 9.
- Born:
  - Lyoto Machida, Brazilian mixed martial artist, UFC Light Heavyweight champion from 2009 to 2010; in Salvador, Bahia state
  - Tomomi Fujimura, Japanese footballer with 20 caps for the Japan national women's team from 1997 to 2002; in Kobe, Hyōgo Prefecture
- Died:
  - Ali Soilih, 41, who had been overthrown as President of the Comoros 17 days earlier, was shot to death while under house arrest. According to the new government, Soilih had been killed while trying to escape.
  - Giuseppe Di Cristina, 55, Italian Sicilian organized crime boss and leader of the Mafia within the province of Caltanissetta, was shot to death by the rival Corleonesi Mafia clan. Only six weeks earlier, Di Cristina had become an informant against the Corleonesi and had co-operated with the *

== May 31, 1978 (Wednesday) ==
- A team of mountaineers, led by S. P. Mulasi, of the Indo-Tibetan Border Police, made the first ascent of Hardeol, a 23,461-foot (7,151 m) peak in the Himalayas.
- Born: Sara Duterte, Vice President of the Philippines since 2022; in Davao City
- Died:
  - József Bozsik, 52, Hungarian footballer with 101 caps for the Hungary national team, died of heart failure.
  - José Gonzalvo, 58, Spanish footballer and manager, died after an operation.
