= Löfgren syndrome =

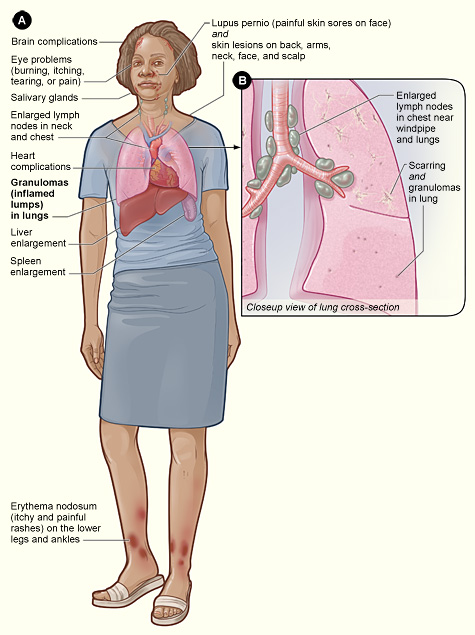
- Löfgren syndrome includes some of the same symptoms as traditional sarcoidosis, and presents with erythema nodosum (especially of the lower extremities), bilateral arthritis of the ankle joints, and hilar lymphadenopathy. (Note: Other symptoms are classically not present in Löfgren syndrome.)

Löfgren syndrome is a type of acute sarcoidosis, an inflammatory disorder characterized by swollen lymph nodes in the chest, tender red nodules on the shins, fever and arthritis. It is more common in women than men, and is more frequent in those of Scandinavian, Irish, African and Puerto Rican heritage. It was described in 1953 by Sven Halvar Löfgren, a Swedish clinician. Some have considered the condition to be imprecisely defined.

== Signs and symptoms ==
It is characterized by enlargement of the lymph nodes near the inner border of the lungs (called "hilar lymphadenopathy") as seen on x-ray, and tender red nodules (erythema nodosum) are classically present on the shins, predominantly in women. It may also be accompanied by arthritis (more prominent in men) and fever. The arthritis is often acute and involves the lower extremities, particularly the ankles.

Löfgren syndrome consists of the triad of erythema nodosum, bilateral hilar lymphadenopathy on chest radiograph, and joint pain.

== Genetics ==
Recent studies have demonstrated that the HLA-DRB1*03 is strongly associated with Löfgren syndrome.

== Diagnosis ==
The triad of erythema nodosum, acute arthritis, and bilateral hilar lymphadenopathy is highly specific (>95%) for the diagnosis of Löfgren syndrome. When the triad is present, further testing with additional imaging and laboratory testing is unnecessary.

== Treatment ==
NSAIDs (nonsteroidal anti-inflammatory drugs) are the usual recommended treatment for Löfgren syndrome. Colchicine or low-dose prednisone may also be used. Treatment with NSAIDs or corticosteroids leads to symptomatic relief of Löfgren syndrome 90% of the time within six weeks of symptom onset. Rarely, long-term joint damage (chronic sarcoid arthropathy) may develop. Disease modifying antirheumatic drugs, also known as DMARDs, are used for such cases.

== Prognosis ==
Löfgren syndrome is associated with a good prognosis, with > 90% of patients experiencing disease resolution within 2 years. In contrast, patients with the disfiguring skin condition lupus pernio or cardiac or neurologic involvement rarely experience disease remission.

== See also ==
- List of cutaneous conditions
- Sarcoidosis
