= In the Name of Our Father =

2018 novel by Olukorede Yishau

In The Name Of Our Father
- Author: Olukorede Yishau
- Language: English
- Genre: Fiction
- Publisher: Parresia Publishers
- Publication date: 2018
- Publication place: Nigeria
- Media type: Print (Paperback)
- Pages: 228
- ISBN: 9781724961631
- Followed by: Vaults of Secrets

In The Name Of Our Father is a 2018 novel written by Nigerian author Olukorede Yishau.

== Plot ==
In The Name Of Our Father is set during the military regime of Sani Abacha, the then military head of state of Nigeria.

== Awards and nominations ==
- Prestigious Book of Year for Lagos Book and Art Festival (2019).
- Nominee Nigeria Prize for Literature (2021).
