= Sven Halvar Löfgren =

Swedish physician (1910–1978)

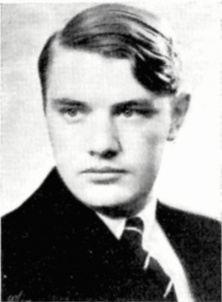
- Born: 1 March 1910; Ulricehamn, Sweden
- Died: 16 June 1978 (aged 68); Stockholm, Sweden
- Education: Karolinska Institute, doctorate, 1946
- Occupation: Pulmonologist
- Organization: Saint Göran Hospital
- Known for: Describing Löfgren's syndrome
- Spouse: Märta Elisabet Ollén (m. 1935)
- Children: 4

Sven Halvar Löfgren (1 March 1910 – 16 June 1978) was a Swedish pulmonologist known for describing Löfgren syndrome, a form of sarcoidosis.

== Early life, education and career ==
Löfgren was born in 1910 in Ulricehamn, Västra Götaland County, Sweden, to Sven August Löfgren and Hilma Ottilia Eliasson. Löfgren graduated with a bachelor's degree in medicine in 1931 and a licentiate degree in medicine in 1936 at Karolinska Institute in Stockholm, where he obtained his doctorate in 1946.

From 1936, Löfgren worked mainly at Saint Göran Hospital in Stockholm, where he became senior physician at the pulmonary clinic in 1957. He became interested early on in the mysterious disease morbus Schaumann, now known as sarcoidosis. In his thesis, he showed that erythema nodosum, which had always implied tuberculosis in the past, was also present in sarcoidosis. Together with Holger Lundbeck, in 1946 the two described what came to be known internationally as Lofgren's syndrome. Löfgren described how erythema nodosum, enlarged lymph nodes on the root of the lung (called hilar lymphadenopathy) and extinguished tuberculin tests were symptoms of an acute but often transient form of sarcoidosis. He became a rallying name at symposia and congresses and, in 1958, helped found the International Sarcoidosis Committee. Löfgren was honored in 1971 with a professorship for his scientific contributions.

== Personal life ==
Löfgren was said to be shy. He was the brother of engineer Stig Löfgren. In 1935 he married physician Märta Elisabet Ollén; the couple had four children: Halvar Olof, Folke Sven, Karin Elisabet, and Barbro Märta.

Löfgren died on 16 June 1978 in Stockholm.
