= The Source (newspaper) =

Newspaper in Vancouver, British Columbia, Canada

The Source Newspaper, also known in French as La Source, is an intercultural newspaper in Vancouver, British Columbia, Canada. In publication since 1999, its editorial offices are at the corner of Granville and Robson Streets in Downtown Vancouver. Styling itself as "A Forum For Diversity", it is dedicated to diversity and intercultural harmony. Also published in French, its readership includes readers from all over British Columbia, as far east as Nelson, all over the island, as far north as Terrace, as well as the whole Lower Mainland. Its founding publisher is Mamadou Gangué.
