= Natalia Valevskaya (fashion designer) =

Russian fashion designer (born 1978)

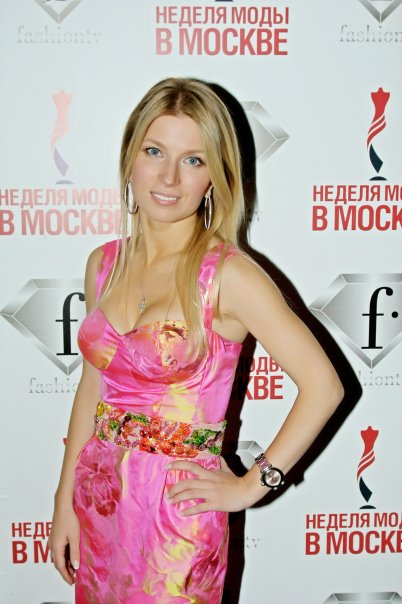
- Moscow Fashion Week, 2009
- Born: the Countess Natalia Valevskaya; 3 June 1978; Moscow, Russia
- Label: Natalia Valevskaya

Natalia Valevskaya (born on 3 June 1978), is a Russian Haute Couture fashion designer and art historian. She has been producing garments under the brand 'Natalia Valevskaya' since 1998. Valevskaya has also been the designer of garments for the participants of several international beauty contests, Russian music shows and festivals. For several years Valevskaya has been a fashion critic and reporter for the Russian magazine OK!. Currently she is a regular columnist of a Russian Internet magazine Posta da VIP. She is also a member of the Russian Artists Union.

== Early life ==
Valevskaya was born on June 3, 1978. As a school student, Valevskaya attended courses in reconstructive goldwork at the Moscow Kremlin.

== Education ==
Valevskaya received her first diploma at the Moscow State Law Academy. She acquired a higher education at the Moscow State University where she majored in fashion theory and management. Valevskaya also completed courses in fashion marketing and promotion in New York. She did a three-year course on scenography and historical costumes at the Mayakovsky Theatre. Currently, Natalia is studying a postgraduate degree at the Moscow State University in Semiotics of Art.

== Fashion ==
Natalia Valevskaya Fashion House was opened in 1998.

In spring 2008, her fashion show opened the Russian Pavilion at the Cannes Film Festival. In autumn of the same year, Valevskaya was invited by Cristina Fernández de Kirchner, the president of Argentina, to show her collection at the Fashion Week in Buenos Aires.

Selected projects:

- The international Modeling competition «The Best of the Best» (outfits for hosts and participants)
- Song competition «The New Wave» in Jurmala (outfits for hosts and some participants)
- MTV Russia Music Awards (outfits for hosts and some participants)
- Muz-TV Awards (outfits for hosts and some participants)
- Miss World (Russian contestant's outfit)
- Mrs. World (Russian contestant's outfit)
- Cooperation with the jewelry house Van Cleef and Arples
- Project with Piaget Russia
- Participation in the Buenos Aires Fashion Week upon personal invitation from the President of Argentina (2008)

== Journalism ==
Valevskaya's reviews are published in various Russian magazines, including OK!, Telenedelya, SNC (formerly Sex and the City). Currently Valevskaya is a regular author of the Fashion column in a Russian online magazine Posta da VIP.

== Art history ==
=== Museum of Fashion and Costume History ===
Since the mid 2000s, Valevskaya has been performing scientific research which could become the basis for the first Russian Museum of Fashion and Costume History.

=== Exhibition of embroidered Orthodox Icons ===
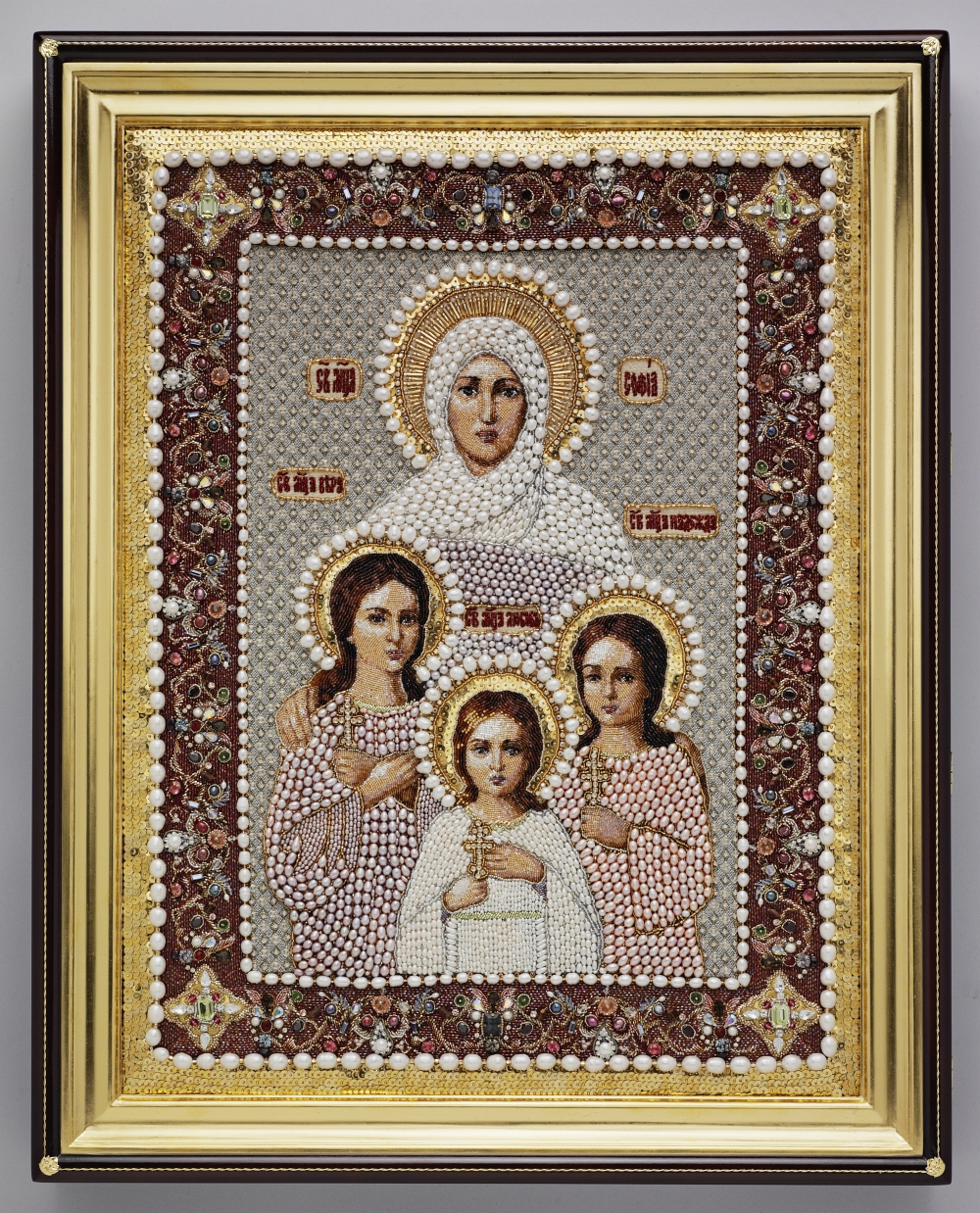
"Faith, Hope, Love and Sophia" - an Orthodox icon created by Natalia Gorkovenko's studio

On March 15, 2012, Valevskaya supervised the opening of embroidered Eastern Orthodox icons exhibition at the Museum of Cathedral of Christ the Saviour in Moscow. The exhibition consisted of works by an art studio created by Natalia Gorkovenko. In the mid-2000s Gorkovenko and her apprentices started the revival of an ancient Russian tradition of religious goldwork and gem embroidery. Every icon required several women working on it for 3 to 7 months. The ready icons have been framed in modern molding or in restored ancient kiots (icon cases). The studio hires an antiquer who restores wooden kiots and gold-plated casings.

One of the icons made by Gorkovenko's studio resides in the Tikvinsky chantry of the Cathedral of Christ the Saviour. All the icons of the exhibition have been created under the blessing of Russian Orthodox Church and with abidance by all religious rules and rituals. The opening of the exhibition has been blessed by Kirill, the Patriarch of Moscow and all the Rus'.
