= Vaults of Secrets =

2020 short story collection by Olukorede Yishau

- First edition
- Author: Olukorede Yishau
- Language: English
- Genre: Political fiction, social novel
- Set in: Nigeria
- Publisher: Parresia Publishers
- Publication date: 1 October 2020
- Publication place: Nigeria
- Media type: Print (paperback), e-book
- Pages: 116
- ISBN: 9789789793587
- Preceded by: In The Name Of Our Father

Vaults of Secrets is a 2020 short story collection by Nigerian writer Olukorede Yishau. It collects ten short stories.

== Plot summary ==
Vaults of Secrets is a collection of short stories with political interpretations regarding to the governance of Nigeria.

== Contents ==
- "Till We Meet To Part No More"
- "This Special Gift"
- "My Mother's Father Is My Father"
- "Letters From The Basement"
- "This Thing Called Love"
- "Better Than The Devil"
- "Otapiapia"
- "When Truth Dies"
- "Lydia's World"
- "Open Wound"

== Style ==
The novel often switched between the author's view and the first person view.

== Reception ==
The Brittle Paper praised the book, saying that its "...beautifully drawn characters unveil the many grotesques of human life and shed light on their dark recesses exposing their weaknesses." Enang Godswill of The Nation noted that "Yishau incorporates the theme of African beliefs in this collection." while Titilade Oyemade writing for Business Day reviewed that "This collection is a meditation on what it means to make unhealthy decisions and the impact of the decisions in your life." Gabriel Amalu of The Nation newspaper calls the novel a "fictional reality." An editor at The Readers Hut described it as "satirical political book, the undertones of politics and the state of Nigeria were present." For Segun Ayobulu, it is "...is a graphic fictional narrative of the political economy of greed and criminal pursuit of wealth acquisition at practically all spheres of life in contemporary Nigeria."
