= 1989 =

1989 in various calendars
- Gregorian calendar: 1989; MCMLXXXIX
- Ab urbe condita: 2742
- Armenian calendar: 1438; ԹՎ ՌՆԼԸ
- Assyrian calendar: 6739
- Baháʼí calendar: 145–146
- Balinese saka calendar: 1910–1911
- Bengali calendar: 1395–1396
- Berber calendar: 2939
- British Regnal year: 37 Eliz. 2 – 38 Eliz. 2
- Buddhist calendar: 2533
- Burmese calendar: 1351
- Byzantine calendar: 7497–7498
- Chinese calendar: 戊辰年 (Earth Dragon); 4686 or 4479 — to — 己巳年 (Earth Snake); 4687 or 4480
- Coptic calendar: 1705–1706
- Discordian calendar: 3155
- Ethiopian calendar: 1981–1982
- Hebrew calendar: 5749–5750
- Hindu calendars
- Vikram Samvat: 2045–2046
- Shaka Samvat: 1910–1911
- Kali Yuga: 5089–5090
- Holocene calendar: 11989
- Igbo calendar: 989–990
- Iranian calendar: 1367–1368
- Islamic calendar: 1409–1410
- Japanese calendar: Shōwa 64 / Heisei 1 (平成元年)
- Javanese calendar: 1921–1922
- Juche calendar: 78
- Julian calendar: Gregorian minus 13 days
- Korean calendar: 4322
- Minguo calendar: ROC 78 民國78年
- Nanakshahi calendar: 521
- Thai solar calendar: 2532
- Tibetan calendar: ས་ཕོ་འབྲུག་ལོ་ (male Earth-Dragon); 2115 or 1734 or 962 — to — ས་མོ་སྦྲུལ་ལོ་ (female Earth-Snake); 2116 or 1735 or 963
- Unix time: 599616000 – 631151999

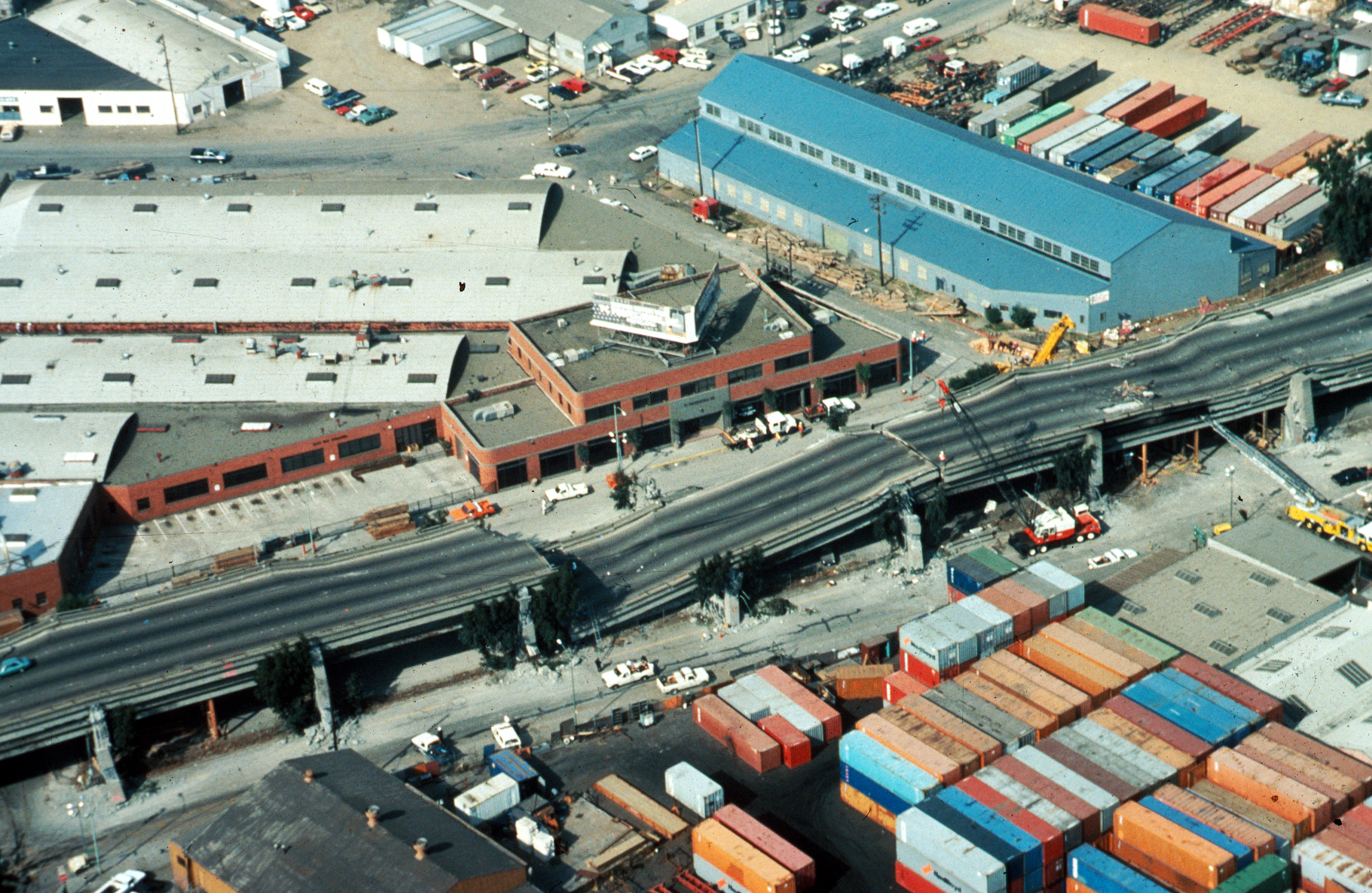
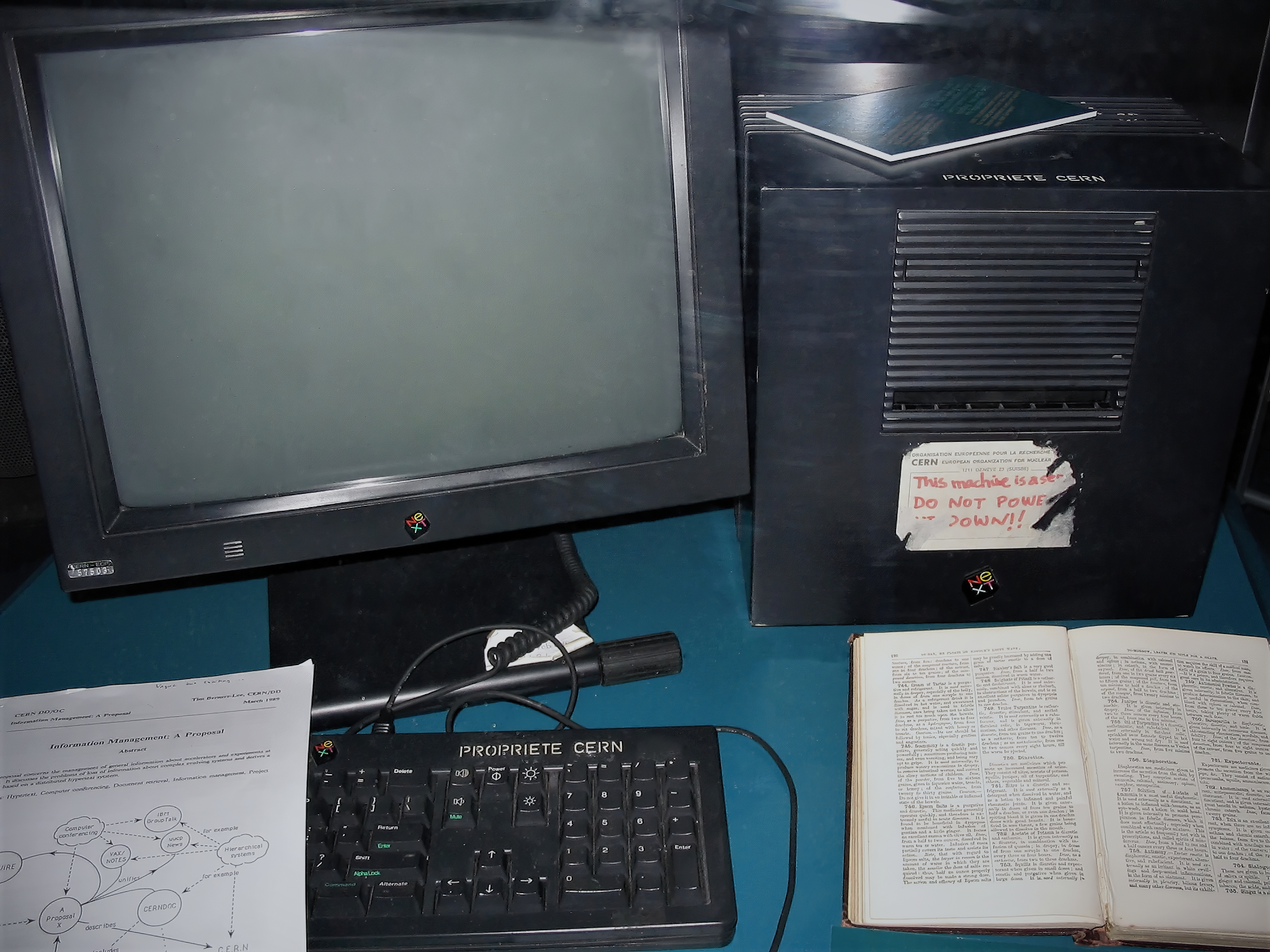
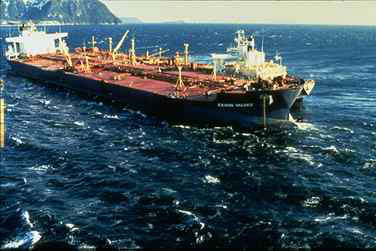
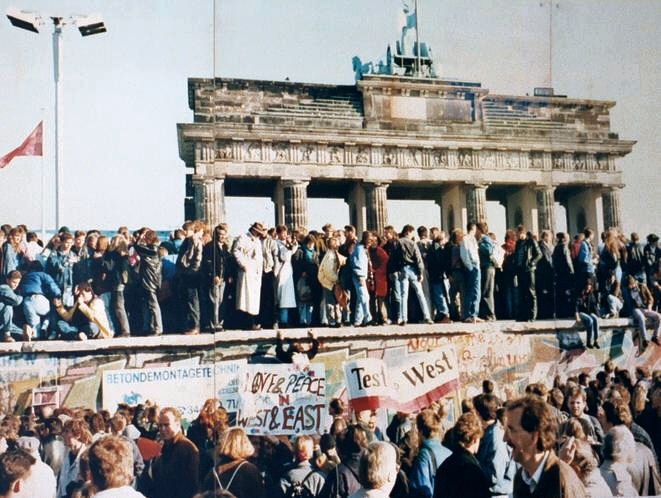
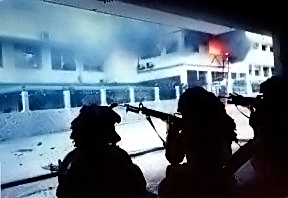
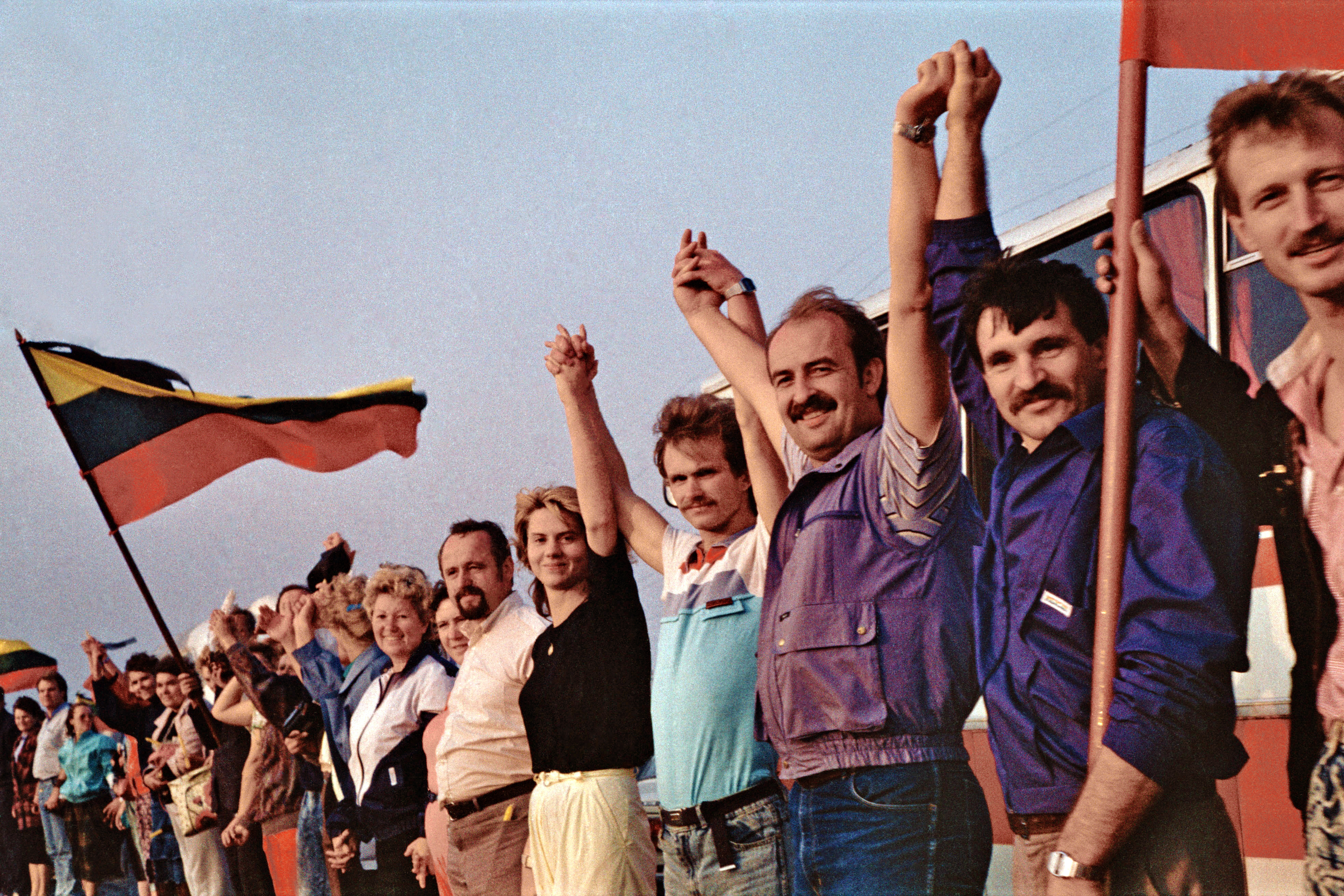
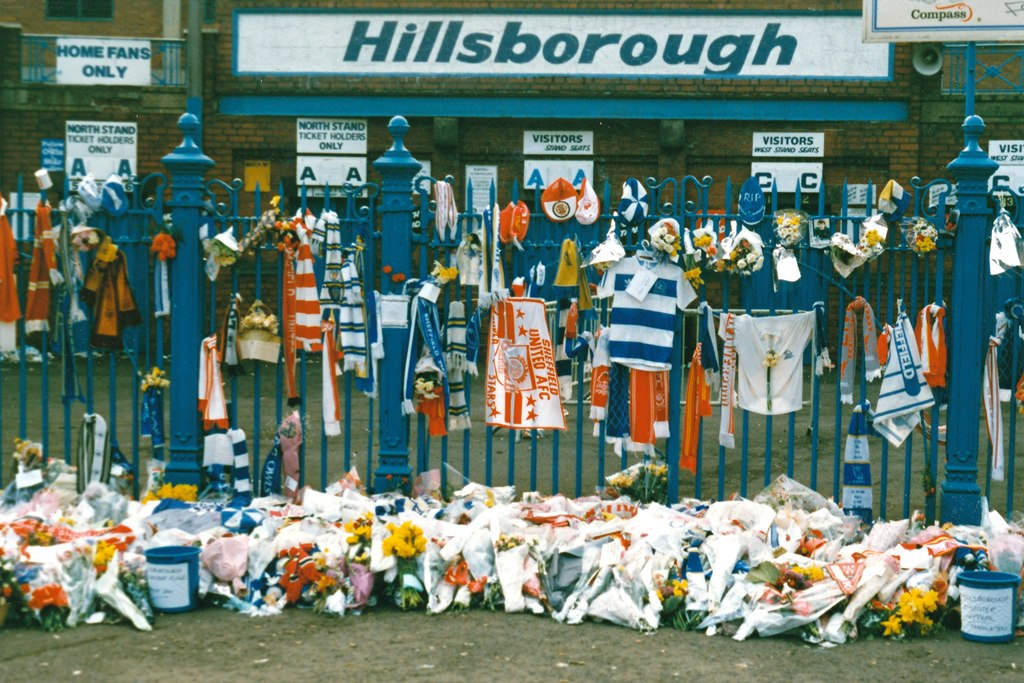
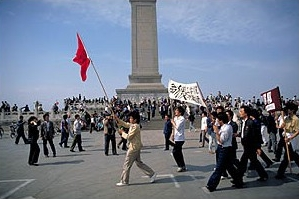
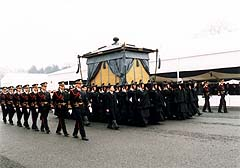
From left to right, top to bottom:
- an earthquake strikes the San Francisco Bay Area, killing 63 people;
- the proposal document for the World Wide Web is submitted;
- the Exxon Valdez oil tanker runs aground in Prince William Sound, Alaska, causing a large oil spill;
- the fall of the Berlin Wall begins the downfall of Communism in Eastern Europe, and heralds German reunification;
- the United States invades Panama to depose Manuel Noriega;
- the Baltic Way led to the independence of the Baltic states of Estonia, Latvia, and Lithuania from the Soviet Union;
- the stands of Hillsborough Stadium in Sheffield, Yorkshire, where the Hillsborough disaster occurred;
- students demonstrate in Tiananmen Square, Beijing; many are killed by forces of the Chinese Communist Party.
- the state funeral procession of Hirohito

1989 (MCMLXXXIX) was a common year starting on Sunday of the Gregorian calendar, the 1989th year of the Common Era (CE) and Anno Domini (AD) designations, the 989th year of the 2nd millennium, the 89th year of the 20th century, and the 10th and last year of the 1980s decade.

1989 was a turning point in political history with the "Revolutions of 1989" which ended communism in Eastern Bloc of Europe, starting in Poland and Hungary, with experiments in power-sharing coming to a head with the opening of the Berlin Wall in November, the Velvet Revolution in Czechoslovakia and the overthrow of the communist dictatorship in Romania in December; the movement ended in December 1991 with the dissolution of the Soviet Union. Revolutions against communist governments in Eastern Europe mainly succeeded, but the year also saw the suppression by the Chinese government of the 1989 Tiananmen Square protests in Beijing.

It was the year of the first Brazilian direct presidential election in 29 years, since the end of the military government in 1985 that ruled the country for more than twenty years, and marked the redemocratization process's final point.

F. W. de Klerk was elected as State President of South Africa, and his regime gradually dismantled the apartheid system over the next five years, culminating with the 1994 election that brought jailed African National Congress leader Nelson Mandela to power.

The first commercial Internet service providers surfaced in this year, as well as the first written proposal for the World Wide Web and New Zealand, Japan and Australia's first Internet connections. The first babies born after preimplantation genetic diagnosis were conceived in late 1989.

== Events ==
=== January ===
- January 1 – The New York Times discloses involvement of West German company Imhausen and Salzgitter AG in building a chemical weapon plant in Rabta, Libya.
- January 2 – Prime Minister Ranasinghe Premadasa takes office as the third President of Sri Lanka.
- January 4 – Gulf of Sidra incident (1989): Two Libyan MiG-23 "Floggers" are engaged and shot down by two US Navy F-14 Tomcats.
- January 7 – Emperor Hirohito dies; his son Akihito ascends as the 125th Emperor of Japan, followed by the change in the era name from Shōwa to Heisei on the following day.
- January 8 – British Midland Flight 092 (a Boeing 737-400) crashes on an M1 motorway near the East Midlands Airport, 47 people were killed and 79 people survived.
- January 10 – In accordance with United Nations Security Council Resolution 626 and the New York Accords, Cuban troops begin withdrawing from Angola.
- January 11 – The Lexus and Infiniti luxury car brands are launched at the North American International Auto Show in Detroit with the unveiling of the 1990 Lexus LS and Infiniti Q45 sedans.
- January 13 – Former Ugandan dictator Idi Amin is expelled to Senegal from Zaire after using a fake Zairean passport in an attempt to return to Uganda. Amin is eventually expelled from Senegal and subsequently returns to Zaire after the Saudi government refuses to allow him in Saudi Arabia.
- January 15 – Thirty-five European nations, meeting in Vienna, agree to strengthen human rights and improve East–West trade.
- January 18 – Ante Marković succeeds Branko Mikulić as Prime Minister of Yugoslavia.
- January 20 – George H. W. Bush is inaugurated as President of the United States.
- January 23–24 – Armed civilian leftists briefly attack and occupy an Argentinian army base near Buenos Aires.
- January 29 – The two longest-imprisoned German WWII war criminals in Western Europe, Ferdinand aus der Fünten and Franz Fischer (collectively known as The Breda Two), were released from Dutch prison.
- January 30
  - Prime Minister of Canada Brian Mulroney shuffles his cabinet, appointing six new ministers and reassigning the responsibilities of nineteen others.
  - The Embassy of the United States, Kabul, Afghanistan, is closed; it does not reopen until late 2001.

=== February ===
- February 1 – In Australia, Joan Kirner becomes Victoria's first female Deputy Premier, after the resignation of Robert Fordham over the VEDC (Victorian Economic Development Co-operation) Crisis.
- February 2
  - Soviet–Afghan War: The last Soviet Union armoured column leaves Kabul, ending nine years of military occupation since 1979.
  - Carlos Andrés Pérez takes office as President of Venezuela.
- February 3
  - 1989 Paraguayan coup d'état ("La Noche de la Candelaria"): A military coup overthrows Alfredo Stroessner, dictator of Paraguay since 1954.
  - After a stroke, State President of South Africa P. W. Botha resigns as Leader of the National Party.
- February 5 – Eurosport, a multiple-language sports broadcasting station in Europe, begins broadcasting, from Issy-les-Moulineaux, Île-de-France, France.
- February 6 – The Government of the People's Republic of Poland holds formal talks with representatives of Solidarity movement for the first time since 1981.
- February 7 – The People's National Party, led by Michael Manley, wins the 1989 Jamaican general election.
- February 10
  - Ron Brown is elected as Chairman of the Democratic National Committee, becoming the first African American to lead a major United States political party.
  - U.S. President Bush meets Canadian Prime Minister Brian Mulroney in Ottawa, laying the groundwork for the Acid Rain Treaty of 1991.
- February 11 – Barbara Harris is the first woman consecrated as a bishop of the Episcopal Church in the United States of America (and also the first woman to become a bishop in the worldwide Anglican Communion).
- February 14
  - Union Carbide agrees to pay $470,000,000 to the Indian government for damages in the 1984 Bhopal disaster, a gas leak that killed 3.7 thousand.
  - The Satanic Verses controversy: Ayatollah Ruhollah Khomeini, Supreme Leader of Iran (d. June 3), issues a fatwa calling for the death of Indian-born British author Salman Rushdie and his publishers for issuing the novel The Satanic Verses (1988).
  - The first of 24 Global Positioning System satellites is placed into orbit.

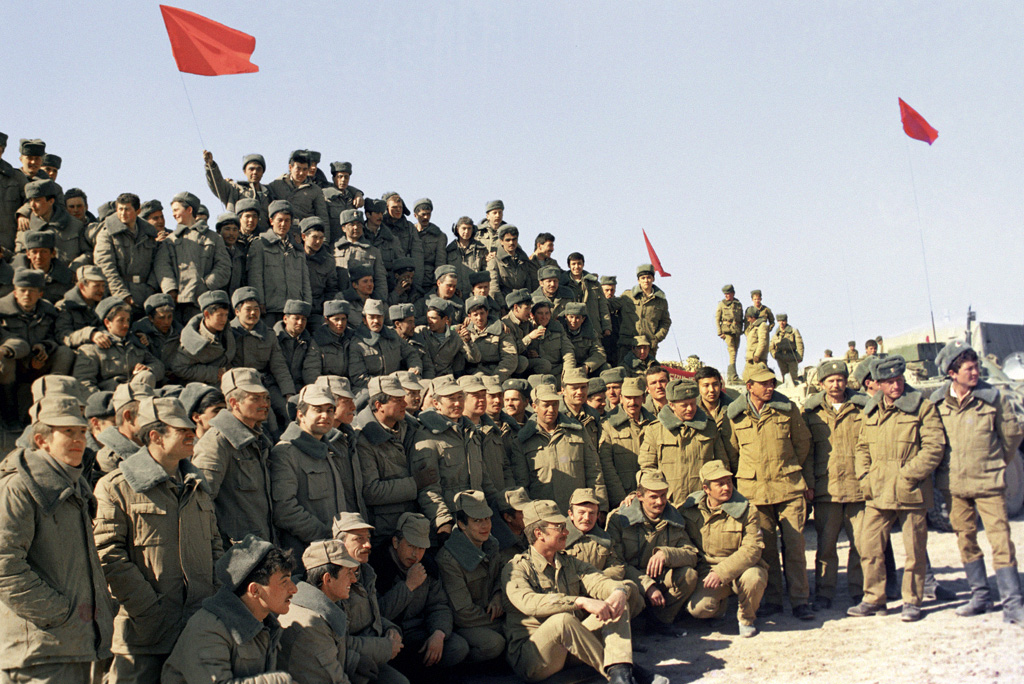
Soviet unit pictured prior to their withdrawal from Afghanistan

- February 15
  - Soviet–Afghan War: The Soviet Union announces that all of its troops have left Afghanistan.
  - Following a campaign that saw over 1,000 people killed in massive campaign-related violence, the United National Party wins the Sri Lankan parliamentary election.
- February 16 – Pan Am Flight 103: Investigators announce that the cause of the 1988 crash was a bomb hidden inside a radio-cassette player.
- February 17
  - The Arab Maghreb Union (AMU) is formed.
  - South African police raid the home of Winnie Mandela and arrest four of her bodyguards.
- February 20 – In Canada's Yukon Territory, the ruling New Democrats narrowly maintain control of the Yukon Legislative Assembly, winning 9 seats vs. the Progressive Conservative Party's 7.
- February 23 – After protracted testimony, the U.S. Senate Armed Services Committee rejects, 11–9, President Bush's nomination of John Tower for Secretary of Defense.
- February 24
  - The state funeral of Emperor Shōwa (Hirohito) in Tokyo is attended by leaders and representatives of 160 nations.
  - The Satanic Verses controversy: Iran places a $3,000,000 bounty on the head of The Satanic Verses author Salman Rushdie.
  - Singing Revolution: After 44 years, the Estonian flag is raised at the Pikk Hermann tower in Tallinn.
  - United Airlines Flight 811, a Boeing 747, suffers uncontrolled decompression after leaving Honolulu International Airport; nine passengers are blown out of the cabin to their deaths.
- February 25–27 – U.S. President Bush visits China and South Korea, meeting with China's Deng Xiaoping and South Korea's Roh Tae-woo.
- February 27 – Venezuela is rocked by the Caracazo, a wave of protests and looting.

=== March ===
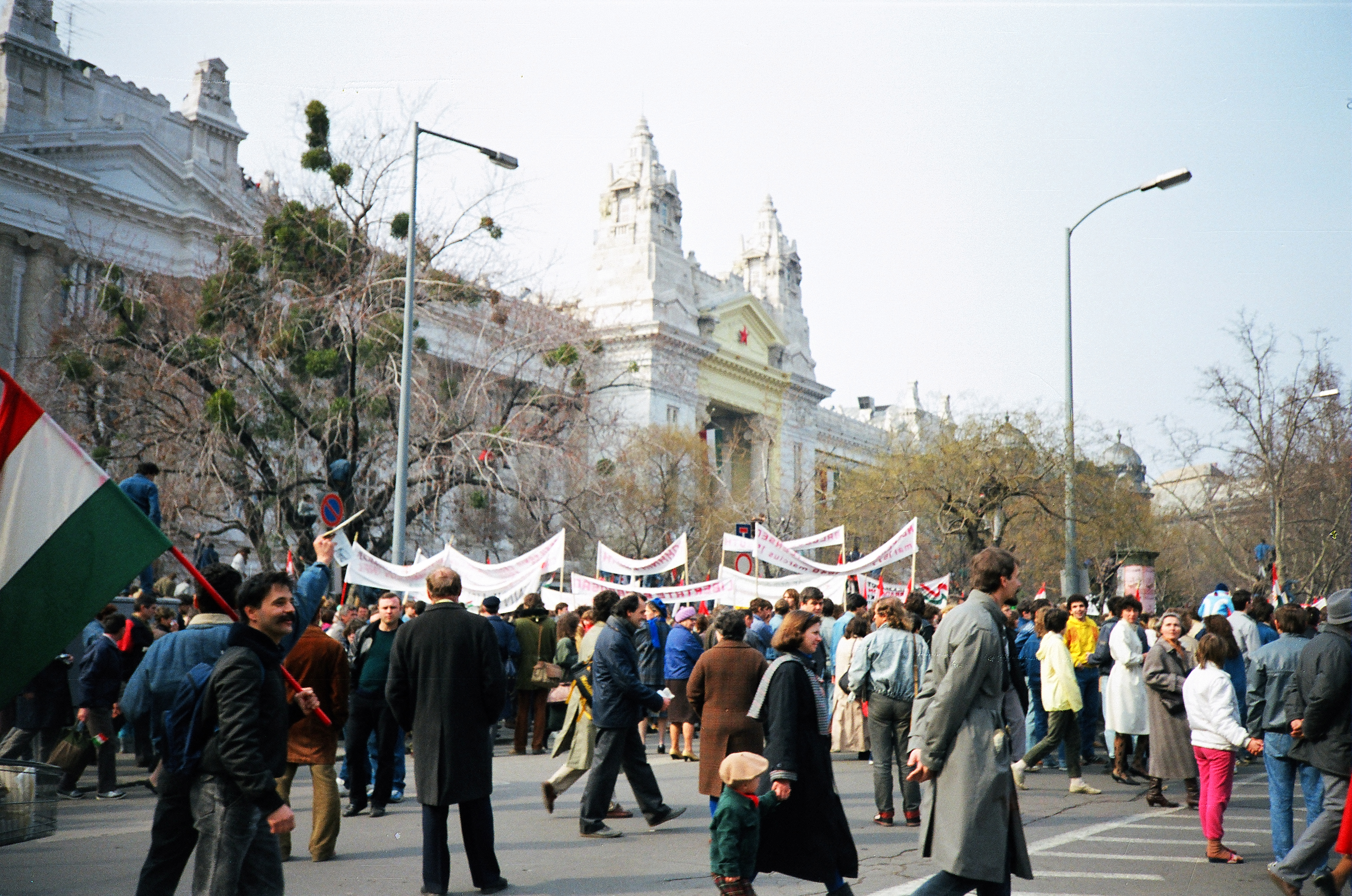
Mass demonstration at the Hungarian state television headquarters

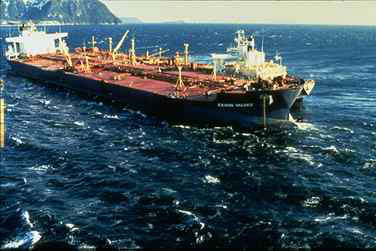
The Exxon Valdez

- March – Poland begins to liberalise its currency exchange in a move towards capitalism.
- March 1
  - The Berne Convention, an international treaty on copyrights, is ratified by the United States.
  - A curfew is imposed in Kosovo, where protests continue over the alleged intimidation of the Serb minority.
  - The Political Party of Radicals, Pacifist Socialist Party, Communist Party of the Netherlands and the Evangelical People's Party amalgamate to form the Dutch political party GroenLinks (GL, GreenLeft).
  - After 74 years, Iceland ends its prohibition on beer; celebrated since as bjórdagur or beer day.
- March 2 – Twelve European Community nations agree to ban the production of all chlorofluorocarbons (CFCs) by the end of the century.
- March 3 – Jammu Siltavuori abducts and murders two eight-year-old girls in the Myllypuro suburb of Helsinki, Finland.
- March 4
  - Time Inc. and Warner Communications announce plans for a merger, forming Time Warner. (Now Warner Bros. Discovery)
  - The Purley station rail crash in London leaves five people dead and 94 injured.
  - The first Australian Capital Territory elections are held.
- March 7 – Iran breaks off diplomatic relations with the United Kingdom over Salman Rushdie's The Satanic Verses.
- March 9 – Revolutions of 1989: The Soviet Union submits to the jurisdiction of the World Court.
- March 12 – Tim Berners-Lee produces the proposal document that will become the blueprint for the World Wide Web.
- March 13 – A geomagnetic storm causes the collapse of the Hydro-Québec power grid. 6,000,000 people are left without power for nine hours. Some areas in the northeastern U.S. and in Sweden also lose power, and aurorae are seen as far as Texas.
- March 14
  - Gun control: U.S. President George H. W. Bush bans the importation of certain guns deemed "assault weapons" into the United States.
  - General Michel Aoun declares a "War of Liberation" to rid Lebanon of Syrian forces and their allies.
- March 15
  - Israel hands over Taba to Egypt, ending a seven-year territorial dispute.
  - Mass demonstrations in Hungary, demanding democracy.
- March 16 – The Central Committee of the Communist Party of the Soviet Union approves agricultural reforms allowing farmers the right to lease state-owned farms for life.
- March 17
  - The Civic Tower of Pavia, built in the eleventh century, collapses.
  - Alfredo Cristiani is elected as President of El Salvador.
- March 20 – Australian Prime Minister Bob Hawke weeps on national television as he admits marital infidelity.
- March 22
  - Clint Malarchuk of the NHL Buffalo Sabres suffers a near-fatal injury when another player accidentally slits his throat.
  - Asteroid 4581 Asclepius approaches the Earth at a distance of 700,000 kilometres (430,000 mi).
- March 23 – Stanley Pons and Martin Fleischmann announce that they have achieved cold fusion at the University of Utah.
- March 23–28 – The Socialist Republic of Serbia passes constitutional changes revoking the autonomy of the Socialist Autonomous Province of Kosovo, triggering six days of rioting by the Albanian majority, during which at least 29 people are killed.
- March 24 – Exxon Valdez oil spill: In Alaska's Prince William Sound, the Exxon Valdez spills 240,000 barrels (38,000 m^{3}) of oil after running aground.
- March 26 – 1989 Soviet Union legislative election: The first (and last) contested elections for the Soviet parliament, Congress of People's Deputies, result in losses for the Communist Party; the first session of the new Congress opens in late May.
- March 29 – The 61st Academy Awards are held at the Shrine Auditorium in Los Angeles, with Rain Man winning Best Picture, and Jodie Foster wins her first award for Best Actress.

=== April ===
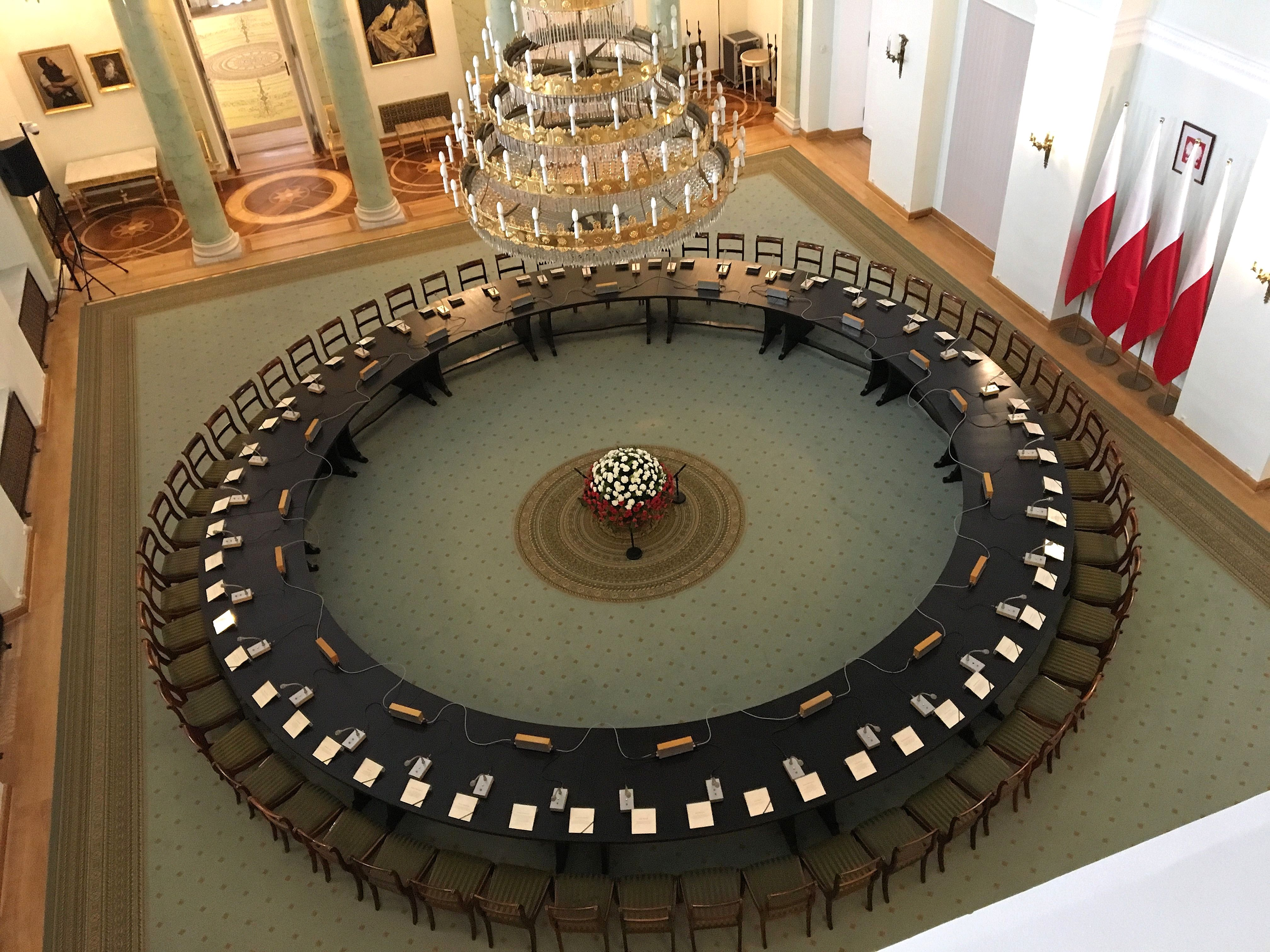
Polish Round Table Agreement

- April 1 – Margaret Thatcher's new local government tax (the poll tax) is introduced in Scotland. It will be introduced in England and Wales the following year.
- April 2 – In South-West Africa, fighting erupts between SWAPO insurgents and the South West African Police on the day that a ceasefire was supposed to end the South African Border War according to United Nations Security Council Resolution 435. By April 6, nearly 300 people have been killed.
- April 4 – A failed coup attempt against Prosper Avril, President of Haiti, leads to a standoff between mutinous troops and the government which ends on April 10, with the government regaining control of the country.
- April 5 – The Polish Government and the Solidarity trade union sign an agreement restoring Solidarity to legal status, and agreeing to hold democratic elections on June 4 (Polish Round Table Agreement), which initiates the 1989 revolution and the overthrow of communism in Central Europe.
- April 6 – National Safety Council of Australia chief executive John Friedrich is arrested after defrauding investors to the tune of $235,000,000.
- April 7 – The Soviet submarine K-278 Komsomolets sinks in the Barents Sea, killing 41.
- April 9
  - Tbilisi massacre: Georgian demonstrators are massacred by Soviet Army soldiers in Tbilisi's central square during a peaceful rally; 20 citizens are killed, many injured. This causes further protests.
  - A dispute over grazing rights leads to the beginning of the Mauritania–Senegal Border War.
- April 13 – Israel Border Police launched a raid in Nahalin, killing five Palestinians.
- April 14 – The U.S. government seizes the Irvine, California, Lincoln Savings and Loan Association; Charles Keating (for whom the Keating Five are named) eventually goes to jail, as part of the massive 1980s savings and loan crisis which costs U.S. taxpayers nearly $200,000,000 in bailouts, and many people their life savings.
- April 15
  - The Hillsborough disaster, one of the biggest tragedies in European football, claims the lives of 94 Liverpool F.C. supporters in Sheffield, England, a further three dying later.
  - Hu Yaobang, the former General Secretary of the Chinese Communist Party, dies. The public reaction to his death spawned a chain of events which led to the Tiananmen Square protests of 1989.
- April 17 – Solidarity (Polish trade union) is once again legalised and allowed to participate in semi-free elections on June 4.
- April 19
  - Central Park jogger case: Trisha Meili is seriously assaulted and raped whilst jogging in New York City's Central Park; the convictions of five teenagers for the crime are vacated in 2002 (the jogger's identity remains secret for years, hence she is referred to as the "Central Park Jogger").
  - The USS Iowa turret explodes on the U.S. battleship Iowa, killing 47 crew members.
- April 20 – NATO debates modernising short range missiles; although the US and UK are in favour, West German Chancellor Helmut Kohl obtains a concession deferring a decision.
- April 21
  - Students from Beijing, Shanghai, Xi'an and Nanjing begin protesting in Tiananmen Square in Beijing.
  - The Nintendo Game Boy has its first official release in Japan
- April 23 – Zaid al-Rifai resigns as Prime Minister of Jordan in the wake of riots over government-imposed price hikes that began on April 18.
- April 25
  - Noboru Takeshita resigns as Prime Minister of Japan in the wake of a stock-trading scandal.
  - Motorola introduces the Motorola MicroTAC personal cellular telephone, the world's smallest mobile phone at this time.
- April 26
  - Sultan Azlan Muhibbudin Shah ibni Almarhum Sultan Yusuff Izzudin Shah Ghafarullahu-lahu, Sultan of Perak, becomes the 9th Yang di-Pertuan Agong of Malaysia, succeeding Baginda Almutawakkil Alallah Sultan Iskandar Al-Haj ibni Almarhum Sultan Ismail.
  - Zaid ibn Shaker succeeds Zaid al-Rifai as Prime Minister of Jordan.
  - The Daulatpur–Saturia tornado, the deadliest tornado ever recorded, kills an estimated 1,300 people in the Dhaka Division of Bangladesh.
- April 27 – A major demonstration occurs in Beijing as part of the 1989 Tiananmen Square protests.

=== May ===
- May
  - Transhumanism: Genetic modification of adult human beings is tried for the first time, a gene tagging trial.
  - The Soviet Union issues its first Visa card in a step to digitalise its banking system.
- May 1 – Andrés Rodríguez, who seized power and declared himself President of Paraguay during a military coup in February, wins a landslide victory at a general election marked by charges of fraud.
- May 2
  - The first crack in the Iron Curtain: Hungary dismantles 240 kilometres (150 mi) of barbed wire fencing along the border with Austria.
  - The coalition government of Prime Minister of the Netherlands Ruud Lubbers collapses in a dispute about a pollution cleanup plan.
- May 3 – Cold War: Perestroika – The first McDonald's restaurant in the USSR begins construction in Moscow. It will open on January 31, 1990.
- May 4 – Oliver North is convicted in the United States on charges related to the Iran–Contra affair. His conviction is vacated on appeal in 1991.
- May 7 – The 1989 Bolivian general election was held in Bolivia.
- May 9 – Andrew Peacock deposes John Howard as Federal Opposition Leader of Australia.
- May 10 – The government of President of Panama Manuel Noriega declares void the result of the May 7 presidential election, which Noriega had lost to Guillermo Endara.
- May 11
  - President Bush orders 1,900 U.S. troops to Panama to protect Americans there.
  - The ACT (Australian Capital Territory) Legislative Assembly meets for the first time.
- May 12–25 – San Bernardino train disaster: Southern Pacific freight locomotive SP 7551 East derails in a residential area of San Bernardino, California, killing four and destroying seven houses. On May 25, as a direct result of the derailment, the Calnev Pipeline explodes, killing an additional two people and destroying eleven more houses and 21 cars.
- May 14
  - Mikhail Gorbachev visits China, the first Soviet leader to do so since Nikita Khrushchev in the 1960s, ending the Sino-Soviet split.
  - Carlos Menem wins the Argentine presidential election.
- May 15
  - Australia's first private tertiary institution, Bond University, opens on the Gold Coast.
  - The last golden toad is seen in Costa Rica; the species is subsequently classified as extinct.
- May 17
  - 1989 Tiananmen Square protests: More than 1,000,000 Chinese protesters march through Beijing demanding greater democracy, leading to a crackdown.
  - In Stuttgart, Diego Maradona of Napoli wins the Uefa Cup.
- May 19
  - 1989 Ürümqi unrest: Uyghur and Hui Muslim protesters riot in front of the government building in Ürümqi, China.
  - 1989 Tiananmen Square protests: Zhao Ziyang meets the demonstrators in Tiananmen Square.
  - Ciriaco De Mita resigns as Prime Minister of Italy.
- May 20 – 1989 Tiananmen Square protests: The Chinese government declares martial law in Beijing.
- May 21: Bombing near Keserwan by Kataeb Regulatory Forces, 9 Syrians soldiers killed.
- May 24
  - Milan of Italy wins the European Cup beating Steaua București of Romania 4–0 in Barcelona.
  - Assassinations of Jeffrey Brent Ball and Todd Ray Wilson: A terrorist organization, Zarate Willka Armed Forces of Liberation, kills two American missionaries of the Church of Jesus Christ of Latter-day Saints as they return to their apartment, in La Paz, Bolivia.
- May 25 – The Calgary Flames defeat the Montreal Canadiens four games to two to win the franchise's first Stanley Cup in ice hockey.
- May 26 – Arsenal F.C. defeat Liverpool F.C. by 2 goals to nil at Anfield, in the final game of the season, to win the Football League First Division.
- May 29
  - Amid food riots and looting set off by inflation, the Government of Argentina declares a nationwide state of siege.
  - 1989 Tiananmen Square protests: The 10 metres (33 ft) high Goddess of Democracy statue is unveiled in Tiananmen Square by student demonstrators.
  - NATO agrees to talks with the Soviet Union on reducing the number of short-range nuclear weapons in Europe.
  - An attempted assassination of Miguel Maza Marquez, director of the Departamento Administrativo de Seguridad (DAS) in Bogotá, Colombia is committed by members of the Medellín Cartel, who kill four and injure 37.
- May 31 – Tarapoto massacre: Six members of the guerrilla group Revolutionary Movement Tupac Amaru (MRTA) of Peru, shoot dead eight gay and transgender people in the city of Tarapoto.

=== June ===
- June 1–10 – Pope John Paul II visits Norway, Iceland, Finland, Denmark and Sweden.
- June 2 – Sōsuke Uno succeeds Noboru Takeshita as Prime Minister of Japan.
- June 3 – The world's first high-definition television (test) broadcasts commence in Japan, in analogue.
- June 4
  - 1989 Tiananmen Square protests and massacre: A violent military crackdown takes place on pro-democracy protesters in Tiananmen Square, Beijing.
  - 1989 Polish legislative election: Solidarity's victory in the first round is the first of many anti-communist revolutions of 1989 in Central and Eastern Europe.
  - 1989 Iranian supreme leader election: Ali Khamenei is elected Supreme Leader of Iran after announcing the death of Ruhollah Khomeini the day before.
  - Ufa train disaster: A natural gas explosion near Ufa, Russia kills 575 as two trains passing each other throw sparks near a leaky pipeline.
- June 5
  - 1989 Tiananmen Square protests: An unknown Chinese protester, "Tank Man", stands in front of a column of military tanks on Chang'an Avenue in Beijing, temporarily halting them, an incident which achieves iconic status internationally through images taken by Western photographers.
  - State funeral of Ruhollah Khomeini: Eight people are killed and hundreds injured in a human crush during the viewing of the body of Iranian leader Ayatollah Khomeini at the Musalla in Tehran, two days after his death at the age of 89 in Tehran.
- June 6 – State funeral of Ruhollah Khomeini: The Ayatollah Khomeini's first funeral in Tehran is aborted by officials after a large crowd storms the funeral procession, nearly destroying Khomeini's wooden casket in order to get a last glimpse of his body. At one point, his body almost falls to the ground, as the crowd attempt to grab pieces of the death shroud. The Ayatollah's body has to be returned for the burial preparations to be repeated, before being brought back to the cemetery a few hours later.
- June 7 – Surinam Airways Flight 764 crashes in Paramaribo, Suriname, killing 176.
- June 8 – The wreck of German battleship Bismarck, which was sunk in 1941, is located about 600 miles (970 km) west of Brest, France.
- June 15 – At the 1989 Irish general election, Fianna Fáil, led by Taoiseach Charles Haughey, fails to win a majority.
- June 16 – A crowd of 250,000 gathers at Heroes Square in Budapest for the historic reburial of Imre Nagy, the former Hungarian Prime Minister who had been executed in 1958.
- June 18 – In the first Greek legislative election of the year, the Panhellenic Socialist Movement, led by Prime Minister of Greece Andreas Papandreou, loses control of the Hellenic Parliament.
- June 22
  - British police arrest 260 people celebrating the summer solstice at Stonehenge.
  - The University of Limerick and Dublin City University are raised to the status of universities, the first established in Ireland since independence in 1922.
- June 24 – Jiang Zemin becomes General Secretary of the Chinese Communist Party.
- June 30 – 1989 Sudanese coup d'état: A military coup led by Omar al-Bashir ousts the civilian government of Prime Minister of Sudan Sadiq al-Mahdi.

=== July ===
- July 2 – Andreas Papandreou, Prime Minister of Greece, resigns; a new government is formed under Tzannis Tzannetakis.
- July 5
  - State President of South Africa P. W. Botha meets the imprisoned 70-year-old Nelson Mandela face-to-face for the first time.
  - The television sitcom Seinfeld premieres in the United States.
- July 6 – The Tel Aviv–Jerusalem bus 405 suicide attack, the first Palestinian suicide attack on Israel, takes place.
- July 8 – 110 Furs representatives, 110 Arabs, and 21 mediators signed a Reconciliation Agreement in al-Fashir. End of the War of the Tribes in Sudan.
- July 9–12 – U.S. President George H. W. Bush travels to Poland and Hungary, pushing for U.S. economic aid and investment.
- July 10 – Approximately 300,000 Siberian coal miners go on strike, demanding better living conditions and less bureaucracy; it is the largest Soviet labour strike since the 1920s.
- July 12
  - In the Republic of Ireland, the Taoiseach Charles Haughey returns to power after Fianna Fáil forms a coalition with the Progressive Democrats.
  - Lotte World, a major recreation complex in Seoul, South Korea, is opened to the public, containing the world's largest indoor amusement park.
- July 14 – France celebrated the bicentennial of the French Revolution, notably with a monumental show on the Champs-Élysées in Paris, directed by French designer Jean-Paul Goude. President François Mitterrand acted as host for invited world leaders.
- July 14–16 – At the 15th G7 summit, leaders call for restrictions on gas emissions.
- July 17
  - The Northrop Grumman B-2 Spirit stealth bomber makes its first flight, in the United States.
  - Holy See–Poland relations: Poland and the Vatican re-establish diplomatic relations after approximately fifty years.
- July 18 – Actress Rebecca Schaeffer is murdered by an obsessed fan Robert John Bardo, leading to stricter stalking laws in California.
- July 19
  - 1989 Polish presidential election: The National Assembly of the Republic of Poland elects General Wojciech Jaruzelski to the restored and powerful post of President of Poland.
  - United Airlines Flight 232 (Douglas DC-10) crashes in Sioux City, Iowa, killing 112; 184 on board survive.
  - The first national park in the Netherlands is established on Schiermonnikoog.
- July 20 – Burmese opposition leader Aung San Suu Kyi is placed under house arrest. She is released in 2010.
- July 21 – Philippine Airlines Flight 124 crashes on approach at Ninoy Aquino International Airport while attempting to land and overrun the runway, everyone survives in the crash but eight people are killed on the ground.
- July 23
  - 1989 Japanese House of Councillors election: Japan's ruling Liberal Democratic Party loses control of the House of Councillors, the LDP's worst electoral showing in 34 years, leading to Prime Minister Uno announcing he will resign to take responsibility for the result.
  - Giulio Andreotti takes office as Prime Minister of Italy.
- July 26 – A federal grand jury indicts Cornell University student Robert Tappan Morris for releasing a computer virus, making him the first person to be prosecuted under the United States' 1986 Computer Fraud and Abuse Act.
- July 27 – In the largest prison sentence to date, Thai financial scammer Mae Chamoy Thipyaso and her accomplices are each sentenced to 141,078 years in prison.
- July 28 – At the Iranian presidential election, electors overwhelmingly elect Akbar Hashemi Rafsanjani as President of Iran and endorse changes to the Constitution of the Islamic Republic of Iran, increasing the powers of the president.
- July 31
  - In Lebanon, Hezbollah announces that it has hanged U.S. Marine Lt. Col. William R. Higgins in retaliation for Israel's July 28 kidnapping of Hezbollah leader Abdel Karim Obeid. The same day, the United Nations Security Council passes United Nations Security Council Resolution 638, condemning the taking of hostages by both sides in the conflict.
  - Nintendo releases the Game Boy portable video game system in North America.

=== August ===
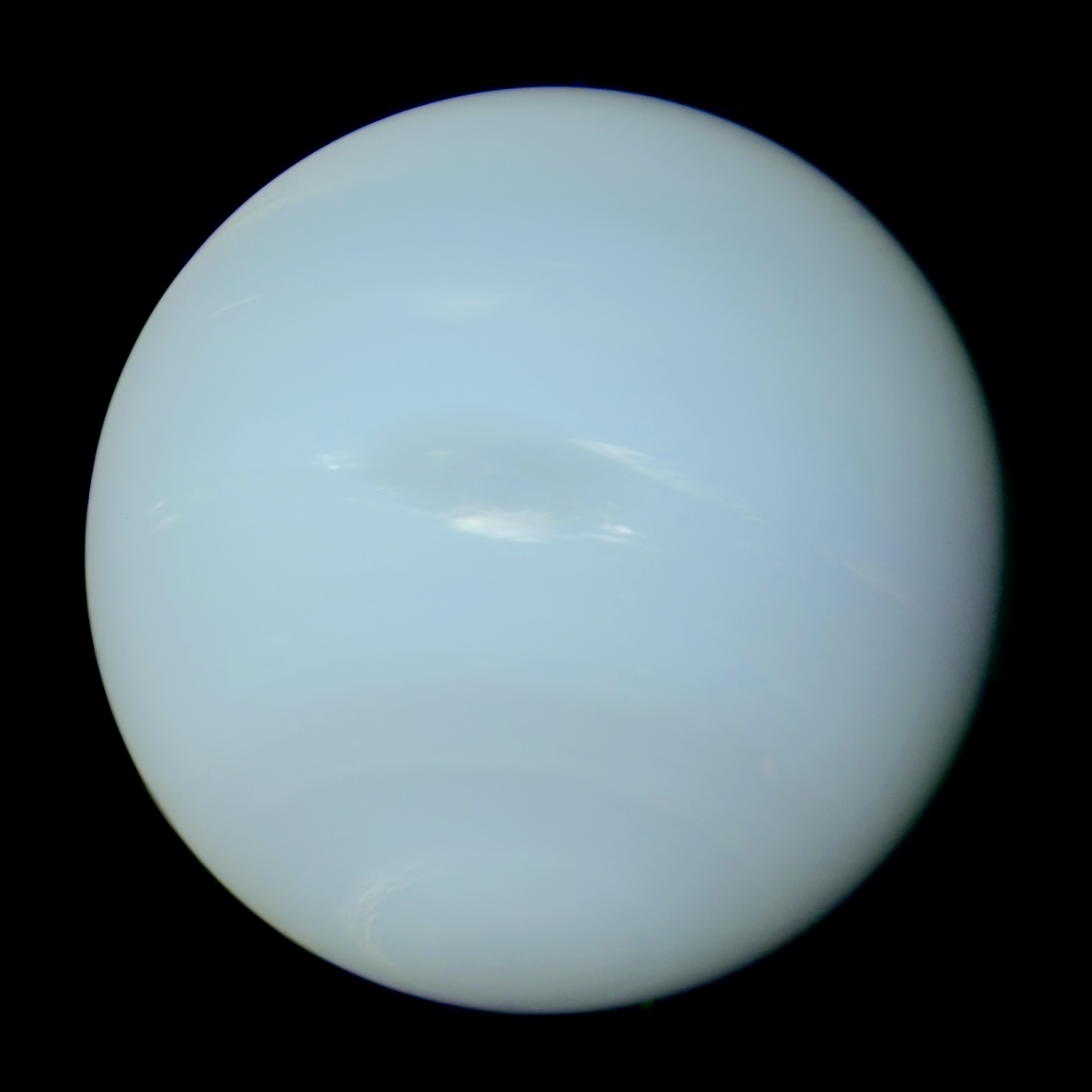
Voyager 2 at Neptune

- August – Gazprom, an energy production and sales organization in Russia, becomes state-run enterprise, changing from the Soviet Ministry of Gas Industry.
- August 2 – Pakistan is readmitted to the Commonwealth of Nations after leaving it in 1972.
- August 5
  - Park Avenue Joe is finally declared the winner after finishing in a dead heat with Probe in the Hambletonian Stakes for parimutuel and prize money purposes, based on the two heat and runoff format, based on average finish.
  - Jaime Paz Zamora is elected President of Bolivia, taking office the next day.
- August 7
  - U.S. Representative Mickey Leland (D-TX) and fifteen others die in a plane crash in Ethiopia.
  - The presidents of five Central American countries agree that the U.S.-backed contras fighting the government of Nicaragua should be disbanded and evicted from their bases in Honduras by December 5.
- August 8
  - Prime Minister of New Zealand David Lange resigns for health reasons and is replaced by Geoffrey Palmer.
  - STS-28: Space Shuttle Columbia takes off on a secret five-day military mission.
- August 9
  - Toshiki Kaifu becomes Prime Minister of Japan.
  - The asteroid 4769 Castalia is the first directly imaged by radar from Arecibo Observatory.
  - The Financial Institutions Reform, Recovery, and Enforcement Act of 1989, a measure to rescue the United States savings and loan industry, is signed into law by President Bush, launching the largest federal rescue to date.
- August 10 – United States Army General Colin Powell became the first Black Chairman of the Joint Chiefs of Staff after being nominated by President Bush.
- August 13 – 1989 Alice Springs hot air balloon crash: An accident near Alice Springs, Australia kills thirteen people.
- August 15 – P. W. Botha resigns as State President of South Africa and F. W. de Klerk becomes the seventh and final holder of this office under this style.
- August 18 – Leading Colombian presidential hopeful Luis Carlos Galán is assassinated near Bogotá.
- August 19
  - Polish president Wojciech Jaruzelski nominates Solidarity activist Tadeusz Mazowiecki to be Prime Minister, the first non-Communist in power in 42 years.
  - The Pan-European Picnic, a peace demonstration, is held at the Austro-Hungarian border.
- August 19–21 – In response to the murder of a judge, a provincial police chief, and presidential candidate Galán, the authorities of Colombia arrest 11,000 suspected Colombian drug traffickers.
- August 20
  - In Beverly Hills, California, Lyle and Erik Menendez shoot their wealthy parents to death in the family's den.
  - Marchioness disaster: Fifty-one people die when a pleasure boat collides with a dredger on the River Thames adjacent to Southwark Bridge in London.
- August 21 – The 21st anniversary of the crushing of the Prague Spring is commemorated by a demonstration in the city.

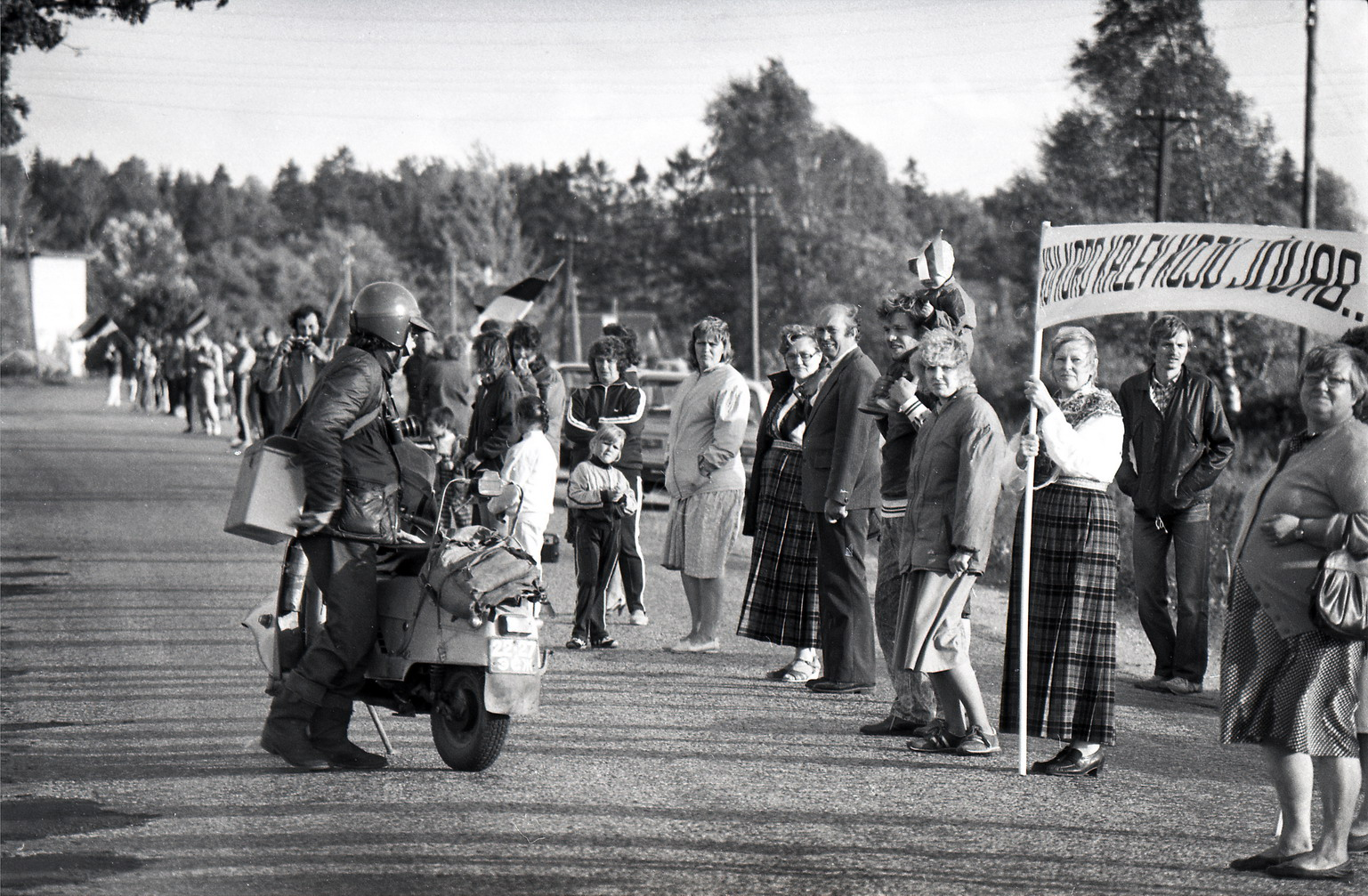
Baltic Way in Estonia

- August 23
  - Singing Revolution: Two million indigenous people of Estonia, Latvia and Lithuania join hands to demand freedom and independence from Soviet occupation, forming an uninterrupted 600 km human chain called the Baltic Way.
  - Hungary removes border restrictions with Austria.
  - 1989 Australian pilots' dispute: All of Australia's 1,645 domestic airline pilots resign over an airline's move to dismiss and sue them over a wage dispute.
  - Murder of Yusef Hawkins in a shooting in the Bensonhurst section of Brooklyn, New York, sparking racial tensions between African Americans and Italian Americans.
- August 24
  - Colombia's cocaine traffickers declare "total and absolute war" against the government and begin a series of bombings and arson attacks.
  - Indonesia's first commercial television network, RCTI (stands for Rajawali Citra Televisi Indonesia), is established, and went on air for the first time.
  - Tadeusz Mazowiecki of Solidarity is elected Prime Minister of Poland.
- August 25 – Voyager 2 makes its closest approach to Neptune and its largest moon Triton.
- August 31 – In the aftermath of the Chadian–Libyan conflict of 1978–87, representatives of Libya and Chad agree to let the International Court of Justice determine ownership of the Aouzou Strip, which has been occupied by Libya since 1973.

=== September ===
- September 6
  - 1989 South African general election, the last held under the apartheid system, returns the National Party to power with a much-reduced majority.
  - In the 1989 Dutch general election, the Christian Democratic Appeal, led by Ruud Lubbers wins 54 seats, and is ultimately able to form a government on November 7 after entering into coalition with the Labour Party.
- September 7 – Representatives of the government of Ethiopia and Eritrean separatists meet in Atlanta, with former U.S. President Jimmy Carter attempting to broker a peace settlement.
- September 8 – Partnair Flight 394 crashes into the North Sea with the loss of 125 lives. The accident was due to the structural failure of the rudder of the Convair 580 caused by the use of counterfeit aircraft parts.
- September 10 – The Hungarian government opens the country's western border (with Austria) to refugees from East Germany.
- September 10–11 – Norway's ruling Labour Party loses eight seats in the parliamentary elections, its worst showing since 1945.
- September 14
  - An agreement of co-operation between Leningrad Oblast (Russia) and Nordland County (Norway) is signed in Leningrad, by Chairmen Lev Kojkolainen and Sigbjørn Eriksen.
  - Standard Gravure shooting: Joseph T. Wesbecker, a pressman on disability for mental illness, enters his former workplace in Louisville, Kentucky, kills eight people and injures twelve before committing suicide after a history of suicidal ideation.
- September 17–22 – Hurricane Hugo devastates the Caribbean and the southeastern United States, causing at least 71 deaths and $8,000,000,000 in damages.
- September 18 – Alleged coup attempt in Burkina Faso by military officials foiled.
- September 19
  - The Catholic Church calls for removal of the Carmelite convent located near the former Auschwitz concentration camp, whose presence has offended some Jewish leaders.
  - UTA Flight 772 explodes over Niger, killing all 171 people on board (the Islamic Jihad Organization claims responsibility).
  - Burkinabé ministers Jean-Baptiste Boukary Lingani and Henri Zongo executed following their arrest the previous day.
- September 20 – F. W. de Klerk is sworn in as the seventh and last State President of South Africa. Soon afterwards he determines to suspend the South African nuclear weapons program.
- September 22
  - Deal barracks bombing: An IRA bomb explodes at the Royal Marine School of Music in Deal, Kent, United Kingdom, leaving 11 people dead and 22 injured.
  - Doe v. University of Michigan: A Michigan court rules against the hate speech law at the University of Michigan, claiming it unconstitutional.
- September 23
  - A cease-fire in the Lebanese Civil War stops the violence that had killed 900 people since March.
  - Nintendo Company Ltd. celebrates its 100th anniversary.
- September 26 – Vietnam announces that it has withdrawn the last of its troops from the State of Cambodia, ending an eleven-year occupation.
- September 27 – The constitutional amendments were approved by Assembly of Socialist Republic of Slovenia which changed the anthem from Naprej zastava slave to Zdravljica and League of Communists of Slovenia ended the monopoly power and reintroduced Parliamentary democracy to the republic.
- September 28 – The Parliament of Greece indicted former Prime Minister of Greece Andreas Papandreou and four of his ministers in connection to the Koskotas scandal.
- September 30
  - Nearly 7,000 East Germans who had come to Prague are allowed to leave for the West on special refugee trains.
  - The Senegambia Confederation is dissolved over border disagreements.

=== October ===
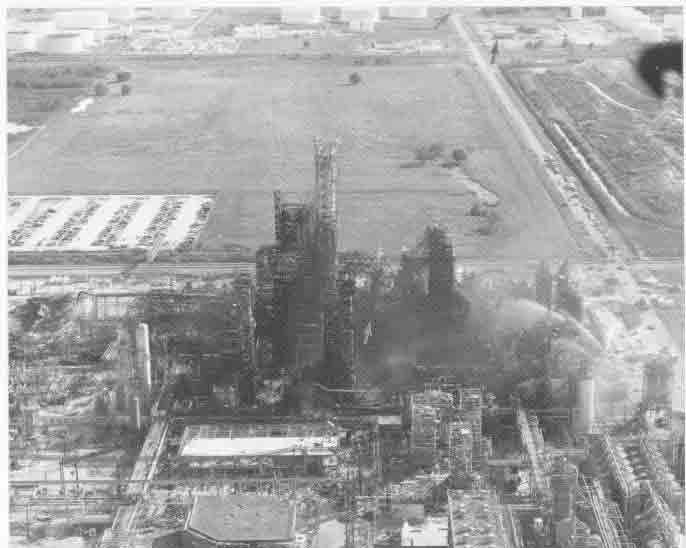
The Phillips disaster

- October – Cold War: Perestroika – Nathan's Famous opens a hot dog stand in Moscow.
- October 1 – Civil union between partners in a same-sex relationship becomes legal in Denmark under a law enacted on June 7, the world's first such legislation.
- October 3
  - A coup attempt is foiled by Manuel Noriega, military leader of Panama.
  - The government of East Germany closes the country's border with Czechoslovakia to prevent further emigration to the West.
- October 5 – The Dalai Lama wins the Nobel Peace Prize.
- October 7
  - The communist Hungarian Socialist Workers' Party votes to reorganise itself as a socialist party, to be named the Hungarian Socialist Party.
  - The first mass demonstration against the Communist regime in the GDR begins in Plauen, East Germany, the beginning of a series of mass demonstrations in the whole GDR which ultimately leads to the reunification of Germany in 1990.
- October 9
  - An official news agency in the Soviet Union reports the landing of a UFO in Voronezh.
  - In Leipzig, East Germany, more than 50,000 protesters demand the legalisation of opposition groups and democratic reforms, the largest demonstration in the country since the uprising of 1953.
- October 13
  - Friday the 13th mini-crash: The Dow Jones Industrial Average plunges 190.58 points, or 6.91 percent, to close at 2,569.26, most likely after the junk bond market collapses.
  - Gro Harlem Brundtland, leader of the Labour Party, resigns as Prime Minister of Norway. She is succeeded by Jan P. Syse, Leader of the Conservative Party, on October 16.
- October 15 – Walter Sisulu is released from prison in South Africa.
- October 17 – The 6.9 M_{w} Loma Prieta earthquake shakes the San Francisco Bay Area and the Central Coast with a maximum Mercalli intensity of IX (Violent). Sixty-three people are killed and the 1989 World Series in baseball is postponed for ten days as a result of the earthquake.
- October 18
  - The Communist leader of East Germany, Erich Honecker, is forced to step down as leader of the country after a series of health problems, and is succeeded by Egon Krenz.
  - The National Assembly of Hungary votes to restore multi-party democracy.
  - NASA launches the uncrewed Galileo orbiter on a mission to study the planet Jupiter, via Atlantis mission STS-34.
- October 19 – The Guildford Four are freed after fourteen years' imprisonment in Britain.
- October 21
  - The Commonwealth Heads of Government issue the Langkawi Declaration on the Environment, making environmental sustainability one of the Commonwealth of Nations's main priorities.
  - Tan-Sahsa Flight 414 crashes into forest during approach killing 131 of 146 people on board.
- October 23
  - The Hungarian Republic is officially declared by President Mátyás Szűrös (replacing the Hungarian People's Republic), exactly 33 years after the Hungarian Revolution of 1956.
  - The Phillips disaster, a chemical plant explosion, in Pasadena, Texas, kills 23 and injures 314 others.
- October 24 – The 1989 Bhagalpur violence, a major incident of religious violence, breaks out in Bhagalpur, Bihar, India; it will kill nearly 1,000 people.
- October 28
  - The United States Flag Protection Act takes effect. There are mass protests in Seattle and New York City.
  - Aloha Island Air Flight 1712, a Twin Otter 300, crashed into mountainous terrain at night during an approach to Molokai Airport killing all 20 occupants on board.
- October 30 – Shawn Eichman, Dave Blalock, Dread Scott and Joey Johnson burn American flags on the steps of U.S. Capitol Building to protest against the Flag Protection Act.
- October 31
  - The Grand National Assembly of Turkey elects Prime Minister Turgut Özal as the eighth President of Turkey.
  - Half a million people demonstrate in the East German city of Leipzig.

=== November ===
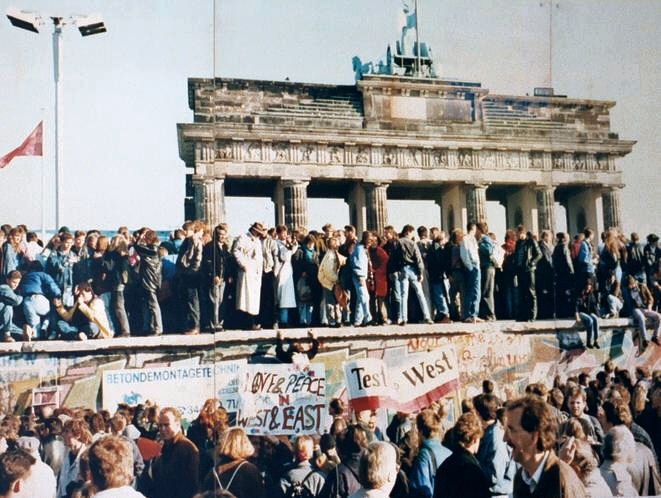
Germans standing on top of the Berlin Wall

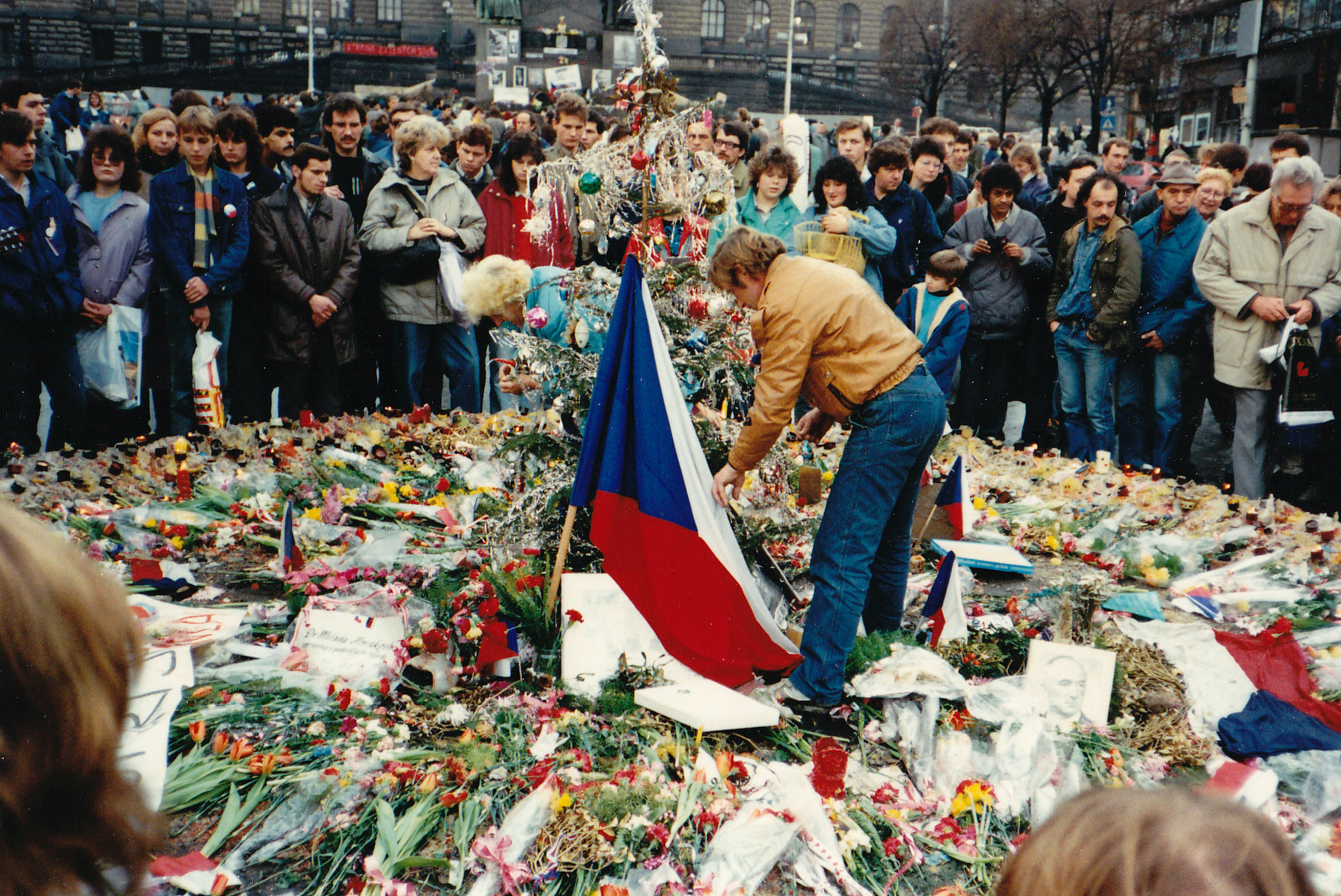
A peaceful demonstration in Prague during the Velvet Revolution

- November – The first commercial dial-up Internet connection in North America is made, by The World STD.
- November 1
  - The President of Nicaragua ends a ceasefire with U.S.-backed contras that has been in effect since April 1988.
  - The border between East Germany and Czechoslovakia is reopened.
- November 3 – East German refugees arrive at the West German town of Hof after being allowed through Czechoslovakia.
- November 4
  - Alexanderplatz demonstration in East Berlin. Half a million people protest against communist rule in East Germany.
  - Typhoon Gay devastates Thailand's Chumphon Province.
- November 5 – Nasrallah Boutros Sfeir is attacked by Maronite demonstrators loyal to Michel Aoun and who reject the nomination of Rene Moawad as president of the country. One of the demonstrators asks the Patriarch to kiss the picture of General Aoun raised above his head, and many follow him saying: "Kiss the picture, kiss the picture". The Patriarch refuses. The scene is hysterical and tragic to the point that Archbishop Bechara Boutros al-Rahi leaves the Patriarch's side and heads to the church of the Patriarchate because he can no longer bear the sight.
- November 6 – The Asia-Pacific Economic Cooperation (APEC) is established.
- November 7
  - Cold War: The Communist government of East Germany under prime minister Willi Stoph resigns, although SED leader Egon Krenz remains as head of state.
  - Lieutenant Governor Douglas Wilder wins the Virginia gubernatorial race, becoming the first African-American elected Governor in the United States.
  - David Dinkins becomes the first African-American mayor of New York City.
- November 9
  - Cold War and Fall of the Berlin Wall: East German official Günter Schabowski accidentally states in a live broadcast press conference that new rules for traveling from East Germany to West Germany will be put in effect "immediately". Late this evening, East Germany opens checkpoints in the Berlin Wall, allowing its citizens to travel freely to West Germany for the first time in decades. In the first week, travel visas will be issued to around 25% of the East German population. One of several significant events on 9 November in German history.
  - Yıldırım Akbulut of Motherland Party (Turkey) (ANAP) forms the new government of Turkey (47th government).
- November 10
  - After 45 years of Communist rule in Bulgaria, Bulgarian Communist Party leader Todor Zhivkov is replaced by Foreign Minister Petar Mladenov, who changes the party's name to the Bulgarian Socialist Party.
  - Gaby Kennard becomes the first Australian woman to fly solo around the world.
- November 12 – Brazil holds its first free presidential election since 1960.
- November 13 – Hans-Adam II becomes Prince of Liechtenstein on the death of his father, Prince Franz Joseph II.
- November 14 – Elections are held in Namibia, leading to a victory for the South West Africa People's Organisation.
- November 15
  - Lech Wałęsa, leader of Poland's Solidarity movement, addresses a Joint session of the United States Congress.
  - Brazil holds the first round of its first free election in 29 years; Fernando Collor de Mello and Luiz Inácio Lula da Silva advance to the second round, to be held the following month.
- November 16
  - Six Jesuit priests are murdered by U.S. trained Salvadoran soldiers.
  - The first American cosmetics shop in the Soviet Union, an Estée Lauder outlet, opens in Moscow.
  - UNESCO adopts the Seville Statement on Violence at the 25th session of its General Conference.
- November 17
  - Cold War: Velvet Revolution – A peaceful student demonstration in Prague, Czechoslovakia, is severely beaten back by riot police. This sparks a revolution aimed at overthrowing the Communist government (it succeeds on December 29).
  - Walt Disney Pictures 28th animated film, The Little Mermaid and United Artists's All Dogs Go to Heaven are both released in theatres.
- November 20 – Cold War: Velvet Revolution – The number of peaceful protesters assembled in Prague, Czechoslovakia, swells from 200,000 the day before to an estimated half-million.
- November 21 – The Members of the Constituent Assembly of Namibia begin to draft the Constitution of Namibia, which will be the constitution of the newly independent Namibia.
- November 22 – In West Beirut, a bomb explodes near the motorcade of Lebanese President René Moawad, killing him.
- November 24 – Following a week of demonstrations demanding free elections and other reforms, General Secretary Miloš Jakeš and other leaders of the Communist Party of Czechoslovakia resign. Jakeš is replaced by Karel Urbánek.
- November 26 – 1989 Uruguayan general election: Luis Alberto Lacalle is elected President of Uruguay.
- November 27 – Colombian domestic passenger flight Avianca Flight 203 is bombed by the Medellín drug cartel in an (unsuccessful) attempt to kill presidential candidate for the 1990 elections César Gaviria Trujillo. All 107 people on board as well as three people on the ground are killed.
- November 28 – Cold War: Velvet Revolution – The Communist Party of Czechoslovakia announces they will give up their monopoly on political power (elections held in December bring the first non-Communist government to Czechoslovakia in more than forty years).
- November 29 – Rajiv Gandhi resigns as Prime Minister of India after his party, the Indian National Congress, loses about half of its seats at the 1989 Indian general election.
- November 30 – Deutsche Bank board member Alfred Herrhausen is killed by a bomb in Bad Homburg (the Red Army Faction claims responsibility for the murder).

=== December ===
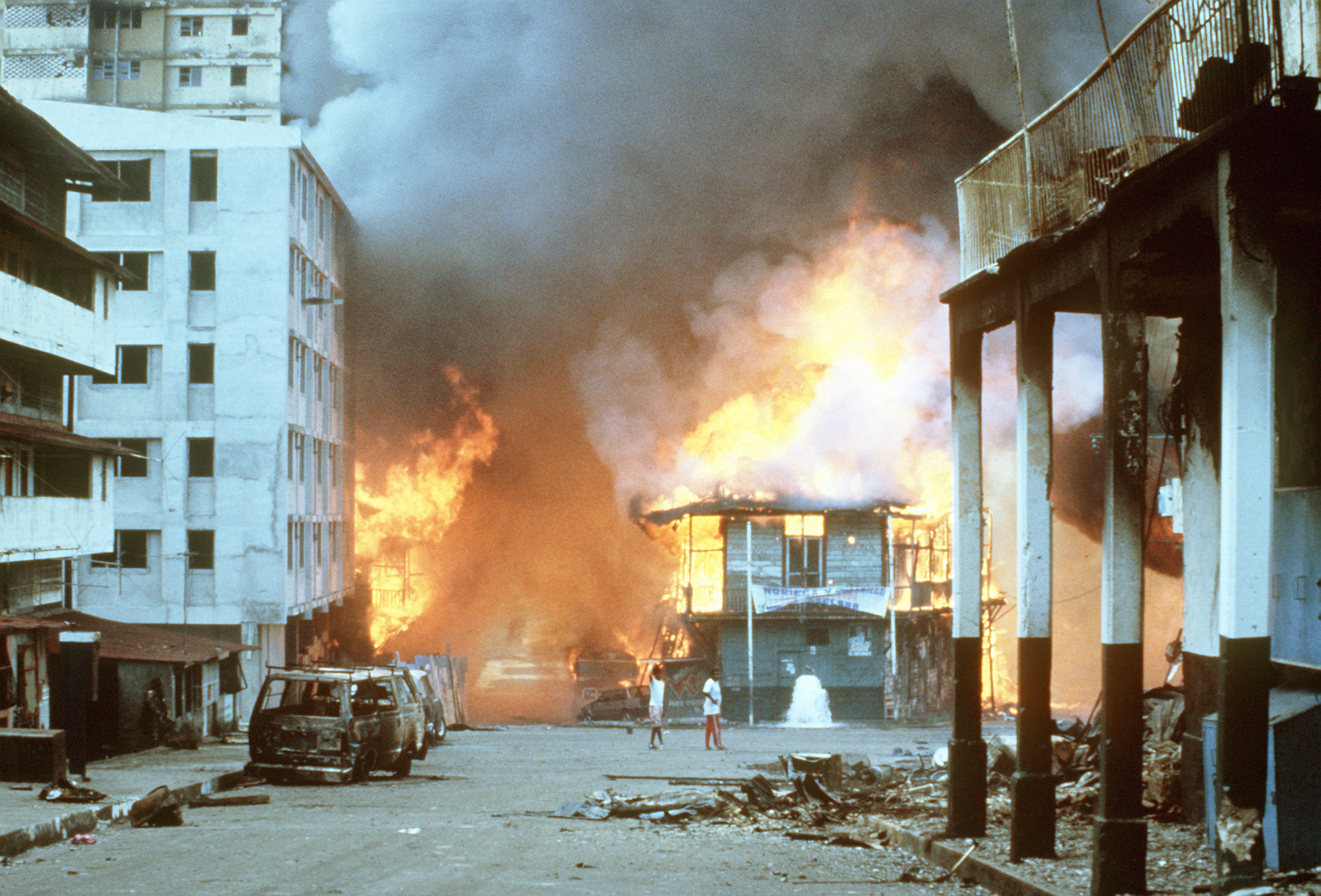
Flames engulf a building following the United States invasion of Panama

- December 1
  - In a meeting with Pope John Paul II, General Secretary of the Soviet Union Mikhail Gorbachev pledges greater religious freedom for citizens of the Soviet Union.
  - Cold War: East Germany's parliament abolishes the constitutional provision granting the Communist-dominated Socialist Unity Party of Germany (SED) its monopoly on power. Egon Krenz, the Politburo and the Central Committee resign two days later.
  - A military coup attempt begins in the Philippines against the government of Philippine President Corazon C. Aquino. It is crushed by United States intervention ending by December 9.
- December 2
  - The Solar Maximum Mission scientific research satellite, launched in 1980, crashes back to earth.
  - V. P. Singh takes office as Prime Minister of India.
  - In the Republic of China legislative election, the Kuomintang suffers its worst election setback in forty years, winning only 53% of the popular vote.
  - The Second Malayan Emergency concludes with a peace agreement. The Malayan Communist Party disbands and Chin Peng remains in exile in Thailand until his death in 2013.
- December 3
  - The entire leadership of the ruling Socialist Unity Party in East Germany, including Egon Krenz, resigns. Hans Modrow becomes de facto the country's last leader.
  - Cold War: Malta Summit – Concluding a 2-day meeting off the coast of Malta, U.S. President George H. W. Bush and Soviet leader Mikhail Gorbachev release statements indicating that the Cold War between their nations may be coming to an end. Gorbachev implies criticism of the 1968 Warsaw Pact invasion of Czechoslovakia.
- December 4 – Prime Minister of Jordan Zaid ibn Shaker resigns and is replaced by Mudar Badran.
- December 6
  - The DAS Building bombing occurs in Bogotá, killing 52 people and injuring about 1,000.
  - Egon Krenz resigns as Chairman of the State Council of the German Democratic Republic, and is replaced by Manfred Gerlach, the first non-Communist to hold that post.
  - École Polytechnique massacre (or Montreal Massacre): Marc Lépine, an anti-feminist gunman, murders fourteen young women at the École Polytechnique de Montréal.
- December 7
  - Ladislav Adamec resigns as Prime Minister of Czechoslovakia. He is succeeded by Marián Čalfa on December 10.
  - Singing Revolution: The Lithuanian Soviet Socialist Republic becomes the first of the republics of the Soviet Union to abolish the Communist Party's monopoly on power.
- December 9 – The Socialist Unity Party of Germany elects the reformist Gregor Gysi as party leader.
- December 10
  - President of Czechoslovakia Gustáv Husák swears in a new cabinet with a non-Communist and then immediately resigns as president.
  - Tsakhiagiin Elbegdorj announces the establishment of Mongolia's democratic movement, that peacefully changes the second-oldest Communist country into a democracy.
- December 11 – The International Trans-Antarctica Expedition, a group of six explorers from six nations, reaches the South Pole.
- December 12 – Hong Kong begins the forcible repatriation of Vietnamese boat people, starting with a group of 59 who are flown to Hanoi.
- December 14 – Chile holds its first free election in sixteen years, electing Patricio Aylwin as president. This marks the first time that all Ibero-American nations, except Cuba, have elected constitutional governments simultaneously.
- December 16 – The Romanian Revolution begins in Timișoara, initiated by the Hungarian minority.
- December 17
  - The Romanian Revolution continues in Timișoara when rioters break into the building housing the District Committee of the Romanian Communist Party and cause extensive damage. The military is called in but fails fully to control the situation.
  - Brazil holds the second round of its first free election in 29 years; Fernando Collor de Mello is elected to serve as president from 1990.
  - The first full-length episode of the animated series of The Simpsons, created by Matt Groening made its debut on FOX in the United States with the episode "Simpsons Roasting on an Open Fire".
- December 19 – Romanian Revolution: Workers in the cities go on strike in protest against the Communist regime. On December 20 about 100,000 occupy Timișoara.
- December 20 – The United States invasion of Panama ("Operation Just Cause") is launched in an attempt to overthrow Panamanian dictator Manuel Noriega.
- December 21 – Nicolae Ceaușescu addresses an assembly of some 110,000 people outside the Romanian Communist Party headquarters in Bucharest. Unprecedentedly, most of the crowd turns against him.
- December 22
  - After a week of bloody demonstrations, Ion Iliescu takes over as President of Romania, ending the communist dictatorship of Nicolae Ceaușescu, who flees his palace in a helicopter after the palace is invaded by rioters. Most of the army has joined with the rioters in Bucharest.
  - The Brandenburg Gate in Berlin is reopened.
  - Two tourist coaches collide on the Pacific highway north of Kempsey, New South Wales, Australia, killing 35 people.
- December 23 – Nicolae and Elena Ceaușescu are captured in Târgoviște.
- December 24 – Charles Taylor's troops cross into Liberia from the Ivorian border, launching their first attack, sparking the First Liberian Civil War.
- December 25
  - Trial and execution of Nicolae and Elena Ceaușescu: Deposed Romanian leader Nicolae Ceaușescu and his wife are summarily tried and executed outside Bucharest.
  - Bank of Japan governors announce a major interest rate hike, eventually leading to the peak and fall of the economic bubble.
- December 28
  - The M_{L} 5.6 Newcastle earthquake affected New South Wales, Australia with a maximum Mercalli intensity of VIII (Severe), leaving 13 people dead and 160 injured.
  - Alexander Dubček is elected Chairman of Czechoslovakia's Federal Assembly (Parliament).
- December 29
  - Czech playwright, philosopher and dissident Václav Havel is elected the first post-Communist President of Czechoslovakia.
  - Riots break out after Hong Kong decides to forcibly repatriate Vietnamese refugees.
  - Nikkei 225 for Tokyo Stock Exchange hits its all-time intra-day high of 38,957.44 and closing high at 38,915.87.
- December 31 – Poland's president signs the Balcerowicz Plan, ending the Communist system in Poland in favor of a capitalist system, leading to abandonment of the Warsaw Pact.

== Nobel Prizes ==

- Physics – Norman Foster Ramsey Jr., Hans Georg Dehmelt, Wolfgang Paul
- Chemistry – Sidney Altman, Thomas Cech
- Medicine – J. Michael Bishop, Harold E. Varmus
- Literature – Camilo José Cela
- Peace – Tenzin Gyatso, 14th Dalai Lama
- Bank of Sweden Prize in Economic Sciences in Memory of Alfred Nobel – Trygve Haavelmo
