= Blaise Compaoré =

President of Burkina Faso from 1987 to 2014

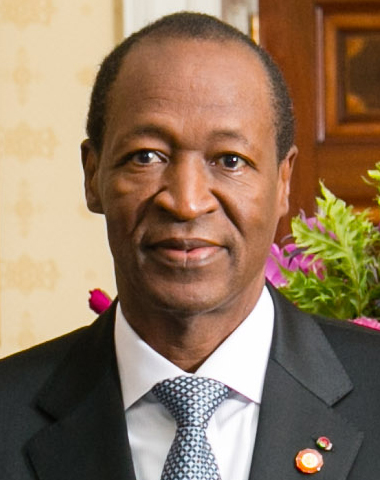
- Compaoré in 2014

2nd President of Burkina Faso
- In office 15 October 1987 – 31 October 2014
- Prime Minister: See list: Youssouf Ouédraogo; Roch Marc Christian Kaboré; Kadré Désiré Ouedraogo; Paramanga Ernest Yonli; Tertius Zongo; Luc-Adolphe Tiao
- Preceded by: Thomas Sankara
- Succeeded by: Honoré Traoré (as Interim Head of State); Roch Marc Christian Kaboré (as President, 2015)

Minister of Justice
- In office June 1985 – 15 October 1987
- President: Thomas Sankara
- Preceded by: Raymond Poda
- Succeeded by: Salif Sampebogo

Personal details
- Born: 3 February 1951 (age 75) Ziniaré, Upper Volta, French West Africa
- Citizenship: Burkina Faso (1951–2016); Ivory Coast (since 2016)
- Party: CDP (since 1996)
- Other political affiliations: ODP–MT (1989–1996)
- Spouse: Chantal Terrasson de Fougères (m. 1985)
- Relations: François (brother)
- Parents: Bila Maurice Compaoré (father); Tiga Thérèse Bougouma (mother)
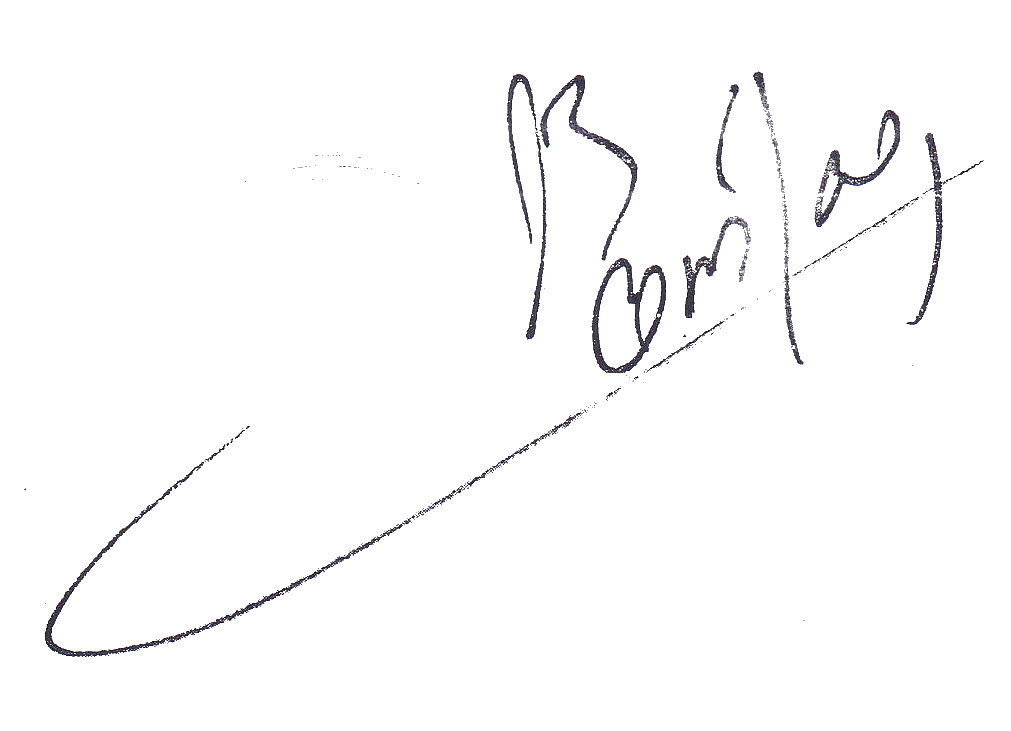
- Signature
- Nickname: Handsome Blaise

Military service
- Allegiance: Upper Volta; Burkina Faso
- Years of service: 1971–1987
- Rank: Captain
- Battles/wars: 1983 Upper Voltan coup d'état Agacher Strip War; 1987 Burkina Faso coup d'état

Blaise Compaoré (French: [blɛz kɔ̃paɔʁe]; born 3 February 1951) is a Burkinabé politician and former military officer who served as the second president of Burkina Faso from 1987 until his government was overthrown in 2014. The longest-serving president in Burkinabé history, Compaoré previously served as the Minister of Justice from 1985 to 1987.

Born and raised in Ziniaré, Compaoré joined the Burkina Faso Armed Forces (then known as Upper Voltan Armed Forces) at the age of 20 in 1971 where he rose through the ranks. Compaoré was a close associate of his predecessor and the country's first President, Thomas Sankara, who appointed Compaoré as Minister of Justice in 1985. The pair were seen as close allies until Compaoré led a coup d'état during which Sankara was killed two years later in 1987. Aged 36 when assuming office, Compaoré was the third youngest Burkinabé president, after Ibrahim Traoré and Sankara.

After taking office, he introduced a policy of 'rectification', overturning the leftist policies pursued by Sankara. In 1989, he founded the Organization for Popular Democracy – Labour Movement (ODP–MT), which merged with twelve other political parties to create the Congress for Democracy and Progress (CDP) in 1996. Compaoré won elections that were not considered free and fair in 1991, 1998, 2005, and 2010. Compaoré's attempt to amend the constitution to extend his 27-year term led to the 2014 Burkinabé uprising, leaving him to resign and flee to the Ivory Coast. In April 2022, he was sentenced in absentia to life imprisonment after being found guilty of complicity in Sankara’s murder.

Compaoré's legacy is complex, with some crediting him with stability and development, while others criticize his records on human rights, corruption and wealth inequality.

== Early career ==
Compaoré was born in Ziniaré, Upper Volta on 3 February 1951. His father was a veteran of the Second World War. He studied at a Catholic school in Fada N'gourma, followed by a Lycée in Ouagadougou. His mother died suddenly when he was 15, followed by the death of his father several years later. Compaoré subsequently became very close to the family of Thomas Sankara, whose father Joseph treated him as his own son.

After being expelled from the Lycée, Compaoré underwent basic military training. During his service he decided to pursue a military career, continuing his studies at the Yaoundé Military Academy in Cameroon. There he became acquainted with Henri Zongo and labor union leader Soumane Touré. Following the end of the 1974 Agacher Strip border clashes between Upper Volta and Mali, Compaoré was posted north of Ouahigouya. There he met Thomas Sankara, with whom he developed a close friendship.

Compaoré played a major role in the coups d'état against Saye Zerbo and Jean-Baptiste Ouedraogo. He has been married to Chantal Compaoré (née Chantal Terrasson de Fougères) since 1985.

Under Sankara's leadership, which lasted from 1983 to 1987, Compaoré was his deputy and a member of the National Revolutionary Council. He served as Minister of State at the Presidency and subsequently as Minister of State for Justice.

== Rise to power ==
Compaoré was involved in the 1983 and 1987 coups, taking power after the second in which his predecessor Sankara was killed. He was elected as the president of Burkina Faso in 1991, in an election that was boycotted by the opposition, and re-elected in 1998, 2005 and 2010.

=== 1983 coup ===
On 4 August 1983, Compaoré organized a coup d'état, which deposed Major Jean-Baptiste Ouedraogo. The coup d'état was supported by Libya, which was, at the time, on the verge of war with France in Chad. Other key participants were Captain Henri Zongo, Major Jean-Baptiste Boukary Lingani and the charismatic Captain Thomas Sankara, who was pronounced President.

During the Agacher Strip War with Mali in December 1985, Compaoré commanded Burkinabé soldiers who split into small groups and employed guerrilla tactics against Malian tanks.

== Presidency (1987–2014) ==
=== 1987 coup ===
Compaoré took power on 15 October 1987 in a coup during which Sankara was killed. Deteriorating relations with France and the neighboring Ivory Coast was the reason given for the coup. Compaoré described the killing of Sankara as an 'accident', but the circumstances have never been properly investigated. Upon taking the presidency, he annulled many of the policies of Sankara, claiming that his own direction was a "rectification" of the Burkinabé revolution.

He initially ruled in a triumvirate with Henri Zongo and Jean-Baptiste Boukary Lingani. In September 1989, Zongo and Boukary Lingani were arrested, charged with plotting to overthrow the government, summarily tried, and executed.

=== First years and 1990s ===
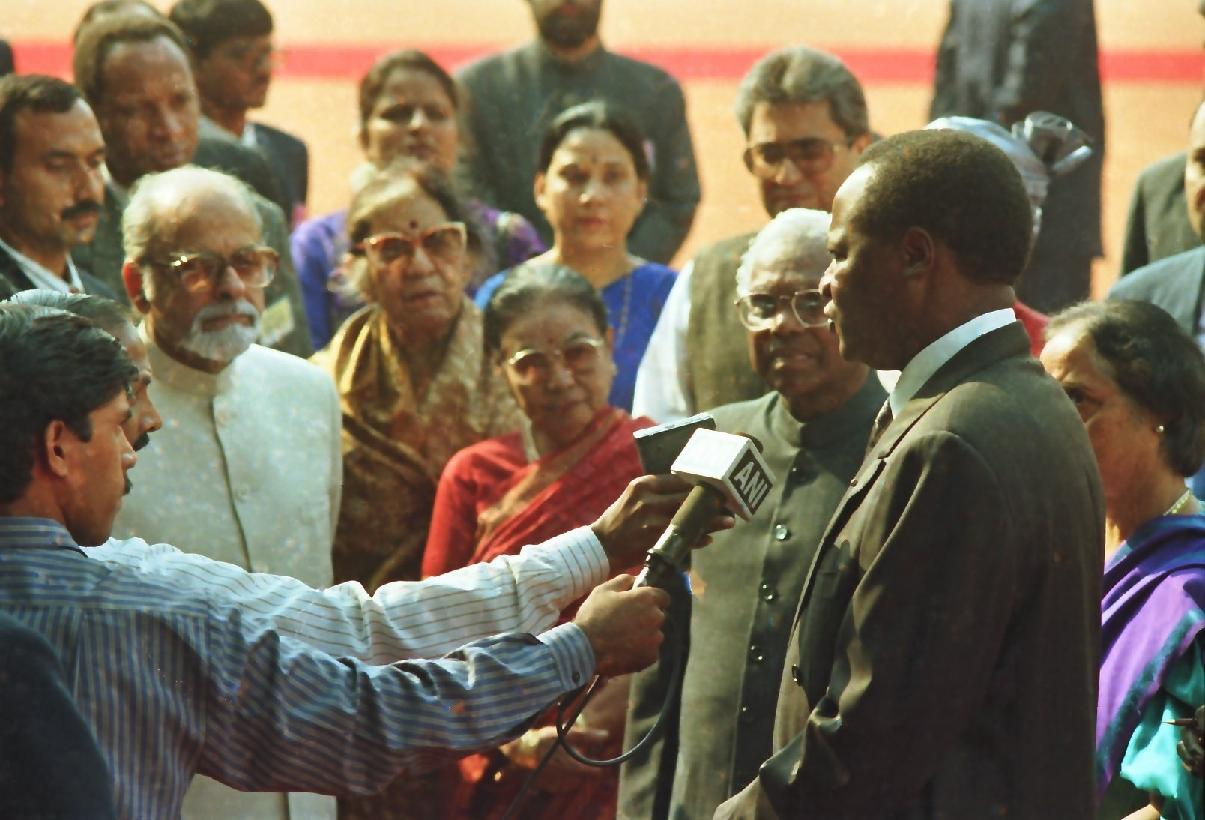
Compaoré in India, 1997

In October 1987, Compaoré and many others formed a new political party called the Popular Front, centered around communist, as well as Marxist–Leninist ideals. He pledged to continue pursuing the goals of the revolution, but to "rectify" policies which he saw as deviating from the path set out by Thomas Sankara.

In September 1989, while Compaoré was returning from a two-week trip to Asia, there were rumors of a plot to overthrow his government and alleged plotters were arrested that same day, while Compaoré changed the membership of the nation's government. In 1990, he introduced "limited democratic reforms." In June 1991, he announced that Burkina Faso would adopt a new constitution.

In the 1990s, Compaoré supported rebels in Sierra Leone during the country's civil war, a war that would kill over 45,000 people and last for 11 years.

In 1991, Compaoré was elected as the president of Burkina Faso, in an election boycotted by the main opposition parties in protest at the questionable means he had allegedly used to take office in the first place. Only 25 percent of the electorate voted. In 1998, Compaoré was re-elected as president.

Between 1998 and 1999, an insurgency began in Burkina Faso. Many protests, riots, strikes, rallies and marches took place throughout the country. Protesters attacked government properties and civilian houses.

=== 2000s ===
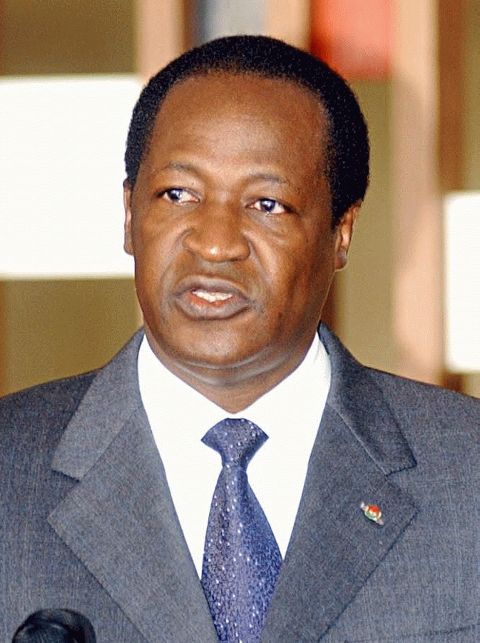
Campaoré in 2003

Compaoré agreed to meet with organizations supervised by the United Nations after allegations surfaced that his government has been involved in smuggling arms to rebels in Sierra Leone and Angola. A week before that, Compaoré met with representatives from Germany, France, and the European Union, to address their concerns that the country had violated the arms embargo against Sierra Leone and Unita rebels.

In 2003, following accusations of a coup plot against Compaoré, numerous alleged plotters were arrested and, in a trial held in April 2004, they were found guilty. Many sympathizers gathered around the court cheering the plotters for their actions.

In August 2005, he announced his intention to participate in the next presidential election. Opposition politicians regarded this as unconstitutional due to a 2000 amendment limiting a president to two terms and reducing term lengths from seven to five years. Compaoré's supporters disputed this, arguing that the amendment could not be applied retroactively, and in October 2005, the constitutional council ruled that because Compaoré was a sitting president in 2000, the amendment would not apply until the end of his 2nd term in office, thereby allowing him to submit his candidacy for the 2005 election. On 13 November 2005, Compaoré was re-elected as president, defeating 12 opponents and winning 80.35 percent of the vote.

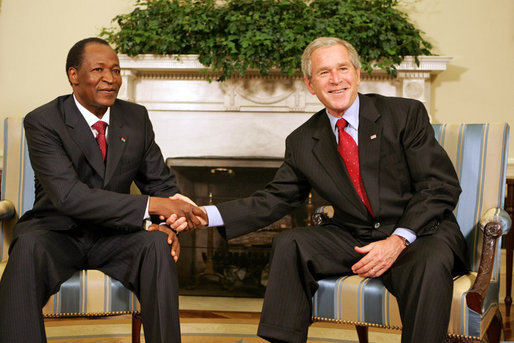
George W. Bush shakes hands with Compaoré, during a meeting in July 2008

Compaoré was sworn in for another term on 20 December 2005.

In 2008, protests took place because of high living costs, calling for wage increases. Compaoré responded by suspending import taxes on products like food for half a year and by increasing subsidies for water and electricity.

==== Spanish Hostages Ransom ====
Two Spanish aid workers were abducted in November 2009 and a manhunt began. One week before the hostages were freed, kidnapper Ould Sid Ahmed Ould Hama fled to Mali where he was found, extradited, and convicted to a 12-year prison sentence. It was reported that the ransom was paid by the president's wife, Blaise Compaoré; the hostages were feted in the presidential palace.

=== Final years in power (2010-2014) ===
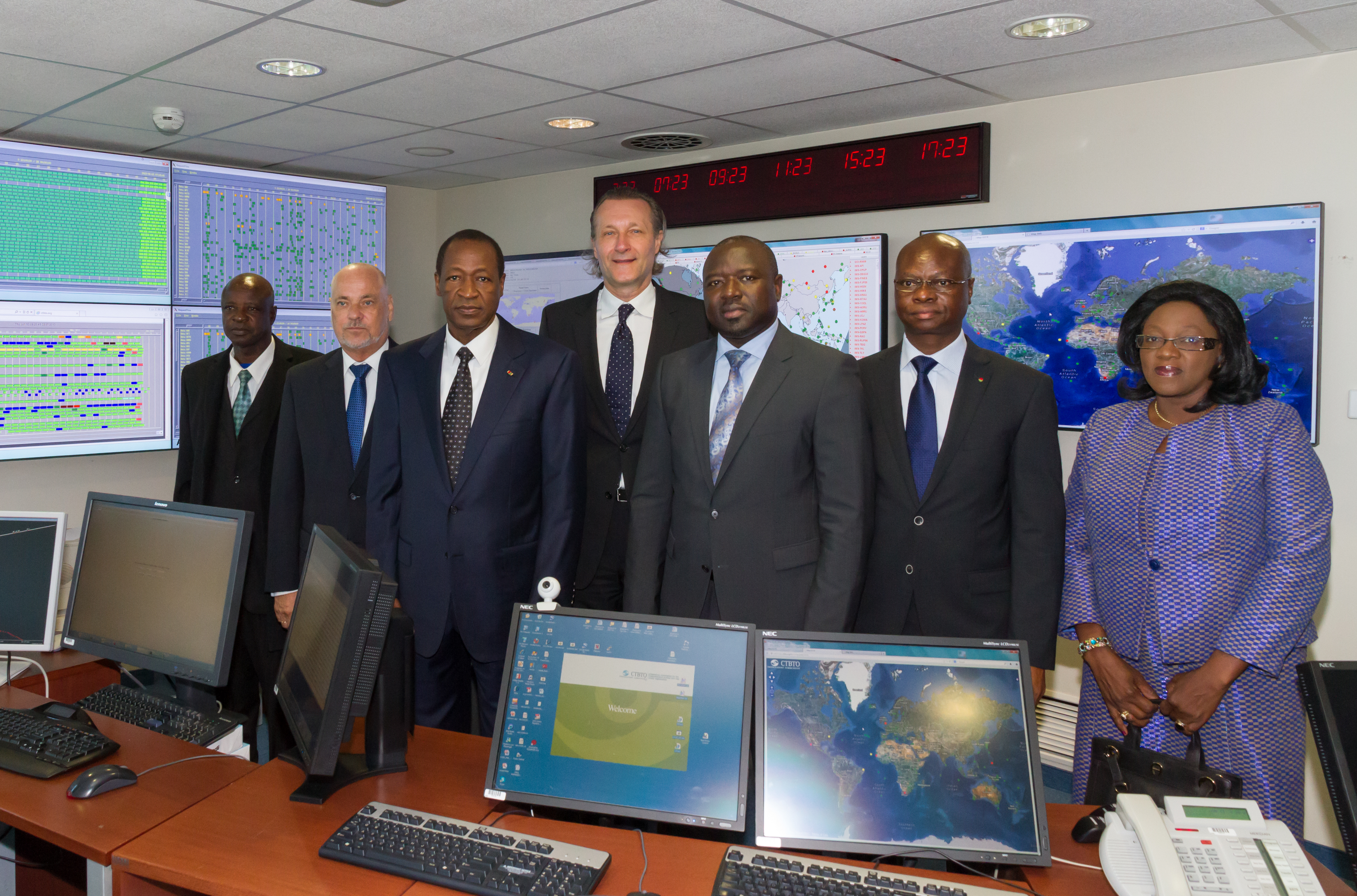
Compaoré in 2013.

Compaoré announced the establishment of a new Senate with a total of 89 members, with 29 of the senators to be directly appointed by the president, and the rest chosen by local politicians.

=== 2011 protests ===
On 14 April 2011, Compaoré was reported to have fled from the capital Ouagadougou to his hometown of Ziniare after military formations mutinied in their barracks reportedly over unpaid allowances, with the mutiny spreading to the presidential compound and army bases. During the night, gunfire was reported at the presidential compound and an ambulance was seen leaving the compound and soldiers began looting shops in the city.

== Fall from power ==
=== 2014 uprising ===
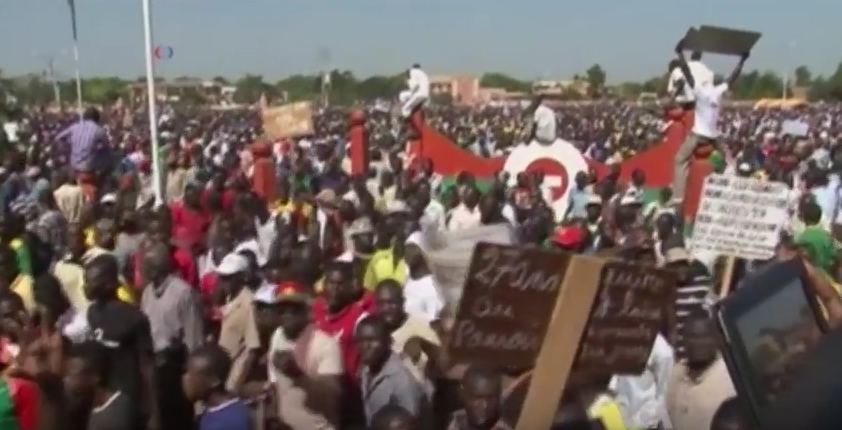
Protesters marching through the capital Ouagadougou, 2014

In June 2014 Compaoré's ruling party, the Congress for Democracy and Progress (CDP), called on him to organise a referendum that would allow him to alter the constitution in order to seek re-election in 2015. Otherwise, he would be forced to step down due to term limits.

On 30 October 2014, the National Assembly was scheduled to debate an amendment to the constitution that would have enabled Compaoré to stand for re-election as president in 2015. Opponents protested against this by storming the parliament building in Ouagadougou, starting fires inside it and looting offices. Billowing smoke was reported by the BBC to be coming from the building. Opposition spokesman Pargui Emile Paré of the People's Movement for Socialism / Federal Party described the protests as 'Burkina Faso's black spring (sic), like the Arab spring (sic)'.

Compaoré reacted to the events by shelving the proposed constitutional changes, dissolving the government, declaring a state of emergency and offering to work with the opposition to resolve the crisis. Later in the day, the military, under General Honore Traore, announced that it would install a transitional government 'in consultation with all parties' and that the National Assembly was dissolved; he foresaw 'a return to the constitutional order' within a year. He did not make clear what role, if any, he envisioned for Compaoré during the transitional period. Compaoré said that he was prepared to leave office at the end of the transition.

On 31 October, Compaoré announced he had left the presidency and that there was a 'power vacuum'. He also called for a 'free and transparent' election within 90 days. Presidential guard officer Yacouba Isaac Zida then took over as head of state in an interim capacity. It was reported that a heavily armed convoy believed to be carrying Compaoré was traveling towards the southern town of Pô. However, it diverted before reaching the town and he then fled to Ivory Coast with the support of President Alassane Ouattara.

A week later, Jeune Afrique published an interview with Compaoré in which he alleged that 'part of the opposition was working with the army' to plot his overthrow and that 'history will tell us if they were right'. He added that he would 'not wish for his worst enemy' to be in Zida's place.

The first head of state that has been in office for more than a short time after Blaise Campaoré is Roch Marc Christian Kaboré as of 29 December 2015.

== Liberian Civil War ==
Compaoré introduced Charles Taylor to his friend Muammar Gaddafi. Compaoré also helped Taylor in the early 1990s by sending him troops and resources.

== International and regional roles ==
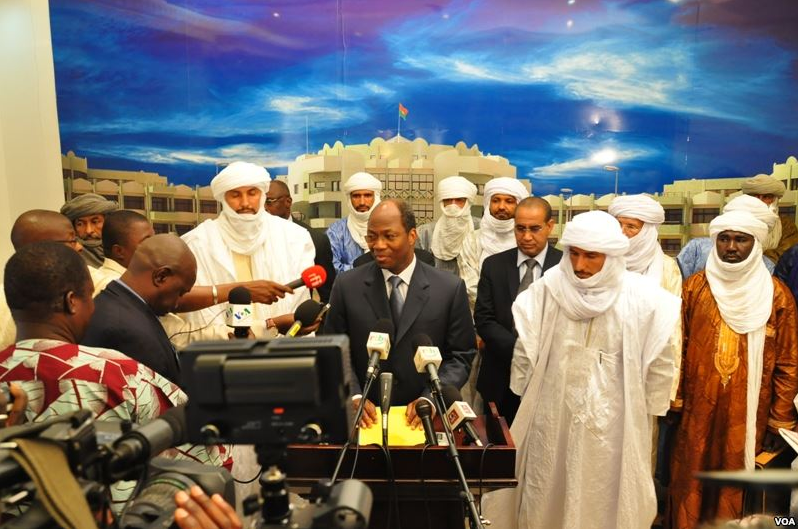
Compaoré's foreign minister Djibril Bassolé with the delegates of Ansar Dine and the MNLA in Ouagadougou on 16 November 2012

In 1993, Compaoré headed the Burkina Faso delegation that participated in the first Tokyo International Conference on African Development.

Compaoré was active as a mediator in regional issues. On 26 July 2006, he was designated as the mediator of the Inter-Togolese Dialogue, which was held in Ouagadougou in August 2006 and resulted in an agreement between the government and opposition parties.

He acted as a mediator in the crisis in Ivory Coast, brokering the peace agreement signed by the Ivorian president, Laurent Gbagbo, and the New Forces leader, Guillaume Soro, in Ouagadougou on 4 March 2007. In March 2012, he acted as a mediator in talks between representatives of the Malian coup d'état and other regional leaders. He hosted talks with them to discuss peace to the conflict.

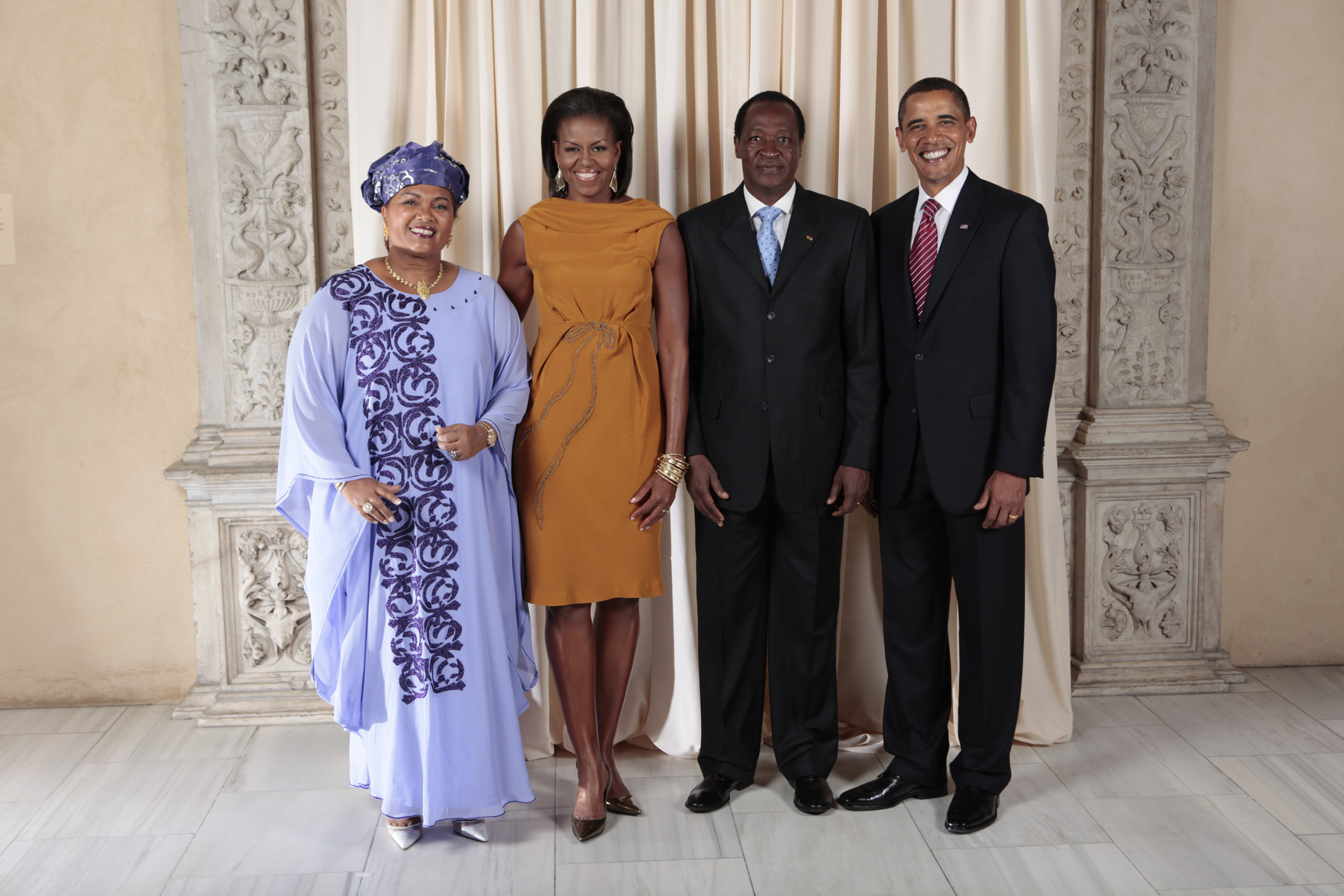
Compaoré with US President Barack Obama

The BBC noted in 2014 that he was 'the strongest ally to France and the United States in the region' and that 'despite his own history of backing rebels and fuelling civil wars in the West African neighbourhood ... more importantly, he used his networks to help Western powers battling Islamist militancy in the Sahel'.

During 2016, the capital was in the grip of a terrorist attack. Jihadists who had suites and tables in town, following agreements with Campaoré of non-aggression. As a result, the military group of the presidential guard received enormous credits while the army was impoverished to avoid any military coup.

He served on the International Multilateral Partnership Against Cyber Threats (IMPACT) International Advisory Board.

== Views on sexuality ==
In an interview with the magazine Famille Chrétienne, Compaoré asserted that the notion of sexual abstinence was not a monopoly of the Roman Catholic Church and that European non-governmental organizations that disagreed with traditional morality were profiting from the situation to intervene in regional African affairs.

== Indictment in exile ==
In April 2021, a military court in Burkina Faso indicted Compaoré in absentia, charging him with the 1987 murder of his immediate predecessor, Thomas Sankara. Another trial against him, on counts of attacking state security, concealing a corpse, and complicity in a murder, began on 11 October 2021. In April 2022, he was found guilty on all charges and sentenced to life in prison.

Compaoré remains in the Ivory Coast as a political refugee, obtaining, in 2016, Ivorian citizenship. A 2015 autopsy on the remains of Sankara revealed that the body was "riddled with bullets."

== Honors ==
- Guinea:
  - Grand Cross of the National Order of Merit (17 July 2014)
- Mali:
  - Grand Cross of the National Order of Mali (August 2013)
- Taiwan:
  - Grand Cordon of the Order of Brilliant Jade (July 1994)

== Sources ==
- Peterson, Brian (2021). Thomas Sankara: A Revolutionary in Cold War Africa. Bloomington: Indiana University Press. ISBN 978-0253053763.

Political offices
Preceded by Thomas Sankara	President of Burkina Faso; 1987–2014	Succeeded by Yacouba Isaac Zida as Transitional Head of State
Diplomatic posts
Preceded by Dawda Jawara	Chairperson of the Economic Community of West African States; 1990–1991	Succeeded by Dawda Jawara
Preceded by Robert Mugabe	Chairperson of the African Union; 1998–1999	Succeeded by Abdelaziz Bouteflika
Preceded by Mamadou Tandja	Chairperson of the Economic Community of West African States; 2007–2008	Succeeded by Umaru Yar'Adua
