= 2003 Burkina Faso coup attempt =

Failed military coup in Burkina Faso

The 2003 Burkina Faso coup d'état attempt was an alleged plot in the landlocked African country Burkina Faso that took place in October 2003. The attempted coup was carried out against long-time strongman President Blaise Compaoré and his CDP regime, and resulted in the imprisonment of several members of the military and political dissidents. Over a decade later, Compaoré would finally be overthrown in the 2014 Burkina Faso uprising.

== History ==
=== Background ===
Blaise Compaoré, a central military figure in the revolutionary government of his predecessor Thomas Sankara, came to power by leading the 1987 coup d'état that killed Sankara. Abolishing many of Sankara's radical reforms, Compaoré took control of a country that had seen multiple failed and successful coups since its independence in 1960 – most of them carried out by the military. During his time in power he was accused of many human rights abuses, using a heavy hand to put down resistance. To facilitate this, he created the Regiment of Presidential Security (RSP), an elite force accused of numerous extrajudicial killings and acts of torture. The RSP's loyalty to Compaoré was doubtful, despite their service – in October 1996 several soldiers of the Regiment, among them the commander Hyacinthe Kafando, were put on trial for plotting to launch a coup, possibly with Ivorian involvement. Other than the threat of military coups, Compaoré also faced opposition from civic society, such as a large 1999 general strike.

=== Plot and trial ===
On 7 October 2003, the alleged attempted coup – and its failure – was announced publicly by Abdoulaye Barry, a government prefect chairing the military court of the capital Ouagadougou. Several had been arrested, and detained by the police. Most of them were connected to the military, especially the Regiment of Presidential Security. The highest-ranking officer to be arrested was Commander Bernadin Poda, accused of siphoning army funds to finance the coup. Among those arrested were also Michel Norbert Tiendrébéogo (leader of the Social Forces Front, a Sankarist political party), and the Christian pastor Israël Pascal Paré. The number of people arrested during the crackdown varies between sources, with some saying 10, others 12, and yet others 16.

At least one of the supposed plotters died in police custody under suspicious circumstances. The person in question, Sergeant Moussa Kabore, was alleged to have hanged himself in his cell on 8 October. The United States embassy expressed concern over the treatment of other detained individuals connected to the coup attempt, and the Burkina Faso Movement for Human and People's Rights (MBDHP) complained that many of the detained had been held without being charged for far longer than the law allowed. In early November MBDHP activists were finally allowed to see the prisoners, and reported that their conditions were "acceptable".

According to government sources, the main instigator of the coup attempt was the Captain Luther Diapagri Oualy, who was to face treason charges. The prosecutor general Abdoulaye Barry stated that Oualy had been in contact with foreign powers, meeting with government representatives in Côte d'Ivoire and Togo in September 2003. Both countries denied any involvement in the plot. In November 2003, Burkina Faso's Foreign Minister Youssouf Ouédraogo stated to various diplomats that the coup had been intended to take place during a cabinet meeting, using weapons received from the Regiment of Presidential Security. Captain Oualy was alleged to have purchased three 4x4 pick-up vehicles, for this purpose.

Several months later, late at night during 17 April 2004, a military court in Ouagadougou announced the trial verdict. Captain Luther Diapagri Oualy was sentenced to ten years in prison, without parole. Six other people were punished, among them pastor Israël Pascal Paré.

== See also ==
- History of Burkina Faso
