= 1989 Burkina Faso coup attempt =

1989 Burkina Faso coup d'état attempt
Date	18 September 1989
Location	Burkina Faso
Result	Arrest and execution of conspirators

Belligerents
Government; NPFL; Supported by: United States	Military faction

Commanders and leaders
President Blaise Compaoré; Charles Taylor	Jean-Baptiste Boukary Lingani (executed); Henri Zongo (executed)

The 1989 Burkina Faso coup d'état attempt was allegedly an attempt at a military coup d'état, planned by Jean-Baptiste Boukary Lingani and Henri Zongo, in addition to other unnamed conspirators. The plot, as described by the government of Burkina Faso, targeted President Blaise Compaoré – who, together with Lingani and Zongo, had previously carried out two coups in the country. All known conspirators were quickly executed.

== History ==
Compaoré, Lingani and Zongo had gotten to know each other in the late 1970s, in what was then the Republic of Upper Volta, as low-ranking officers and members of the ROC, a clandestine left-wing movement. Another member was Thomas Sankara, a close friend of Compaoré. In 1982 the four aided Major Jean-Baptiste Ouédraogo in overthrowing Colonel Saye Zerbo. After Sankara, Lingani and Zongo were arrested by Ouédraogo in 1983, Compaoré launch a military coup on 3 August to rescue his friends and comrades, overthrowing Ouédraogo and making Sankara the country's leader, the other three becoming the principal members of the ruling junta. Together they set about a radical transformation of society, called the "Democratic and Popular Revolution".

On 15 October 1987, Compaoré, Lingani and Zongo joined together to overthrow and murder Sankara. A new junta was declared under the "Popular Front", with Compaoré becoming President of the renamed Burkina Faso. Lingani and Zongo maintained their positions, as Minister of Popular Defence and Minister of Economic Promotion. The triumvirate set out to undo Sankara's far-left reforms, although their cooperation would come to end after two years.

Burkinabé authorities allege that on 18 September 1989, while President Compaoré was on a state visit to China, a planned coup was discovered by Captain Gilbert Diendéré, commander of the Regiment of Presidential Security. The plot, found out just prior to Comaporé's return to the country, was supposed to have taken place the moment Compaoré landed in Ouagadougou. Sources differ on how he was to be met – some say he was supposed to be arrested upon arrival, others that the plane was to be blown up. Lingani and Zongo, the no. 2 and 3 most powerful people in the country, were named as the instigators of the coup attempt, and denounced as fascists. A communique read in state radio stated: "Our people and revolution, and its militants at all levels, have just escaped, on the night of Sept. 18, 1989, a cowardly plot fomented by military and fascist elements led by some ambitious and anti-revolutionary people who are at the very top of the political leadership."

Jean-Baptiste Boukary Lingani, Henri Zongo and two unnamed conspirators were quickly arrested and summarily executed once the reported plot was discovered. Compaoré's rule would go on for another twenty-five years, until his overthrow in the 2014 Burkina Faso uprising.

== See also ==
- History of Burkina Faso
