= Voronezh UFO incident =

1989 alleged sighting in the Soviet Union

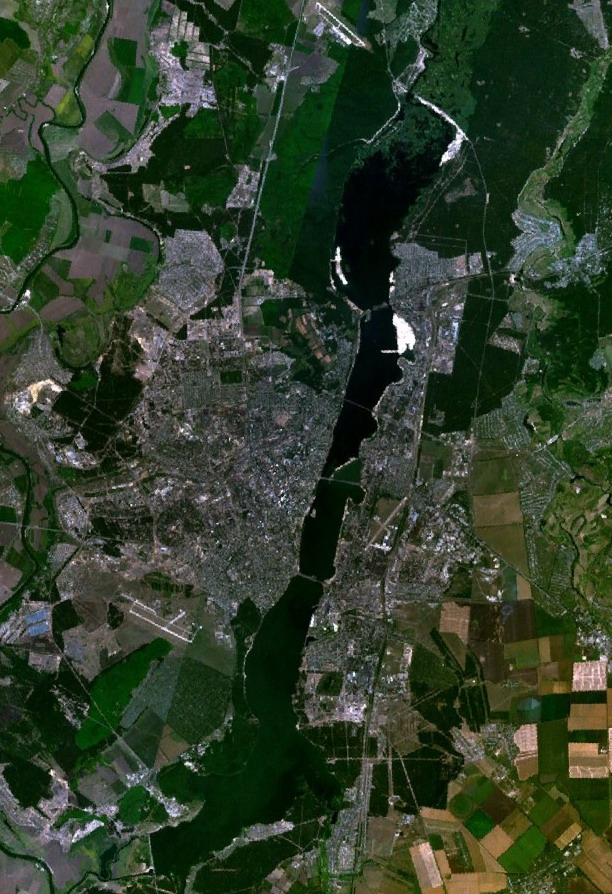
- Satellite image of Voronezh

The Voronezh UFO incident was an alleged UFO and extra-terrestrial alien sighting reported by a group of children in Voronezh, Soviet Union, on September 27, 1989. The area has been popular with UFO-hunting tourists.

== TASS reports ==
According to TASS, boys playing football in a city park "saw a pink glow in the sky, then saw a deep red ball about three metres in diameter. The ball circled, vanished, then reappeared minutes later and hovered". The children claimed to have seen "a three-eyed alien" wearing bronze coloured boots with a disk on the chest, and a robot, exiting the object. According to the children, the alien used a ray gun to make a 16-year-old boy disappear until the object departed.

Though the children were the only ones claiming to have witnessed the aliens, Lieutenant Sergei A. Matveyev of the Voronezh district police station claimed to have seen "a body flying in the sky". The Interior Ministry said they would dispatch troops to the area should the object reappear.

On October 9, 1989, TASS reported that a correspondent had spoken to "10 or 12 youths" who claimed to have seen a flying saucer. The original article quoted Dr. Silanov, of the Voronezh Geophysical Laboratory, as confirming the location of the landing using "biolocation". According to Paul Kurtz, "the method of "biolocation" they used was "a form of ESP dowsing" — whose effectiveness most Westerners question". The report was the most publicized of a series of UFO claims made by official government media, and were promoted as part of the government's new "openness". It was noted that, unlike in America, the reported beings were completely apolitical and did not even speak during their 'visit'. In the immediate aftermath of the alleged incident, hundreds of UFO reports began appearing, with a reporter from Komsomolskaya Pravda even claiming to have an exclusive interview with alien beings from Red Star.

In addition to TASS, Sovietskaya Kultura, a Communist Party paper, publicized the children's claims, with the Communist newspaper defending its decision, saying: "[I]ts coverage was motivated by 'the golden rule of journalism: the reader must know everything." The newspaper was repeatedly asked whether the report was in jest and repeatedly assured it was not.

Following the initial publicity, a private company was formed to sell tours of Voronezh, billed as "land of the aliens", for 59 rubles ($95) per person.

The description of the incident was very similar to stories that appeared in the American magazine Saga, but TASS reporters stated that the witnesses "probably haven't read it." Outside of print media, the U.S. show A Current Affair also sent a crew to report on the alleged event.

=== Ufologists ===
A. Kuzovkin, a UFOlogist, told Socialist Industry he thought a 26-foot wide patch of scorched ground near to south Moscow was caused by UFO landing, however TASS reports said firefighters considered the scorched ground could have been caused simply by a haystack which was caused to ignite.

== Response ==
The Soviet Scientific Commission ordered an inquiry into the alleged incident. According to Paul Kurtz, writing in a 1990 volume of Skeptical Inquirer, the scientists in the Soviet Union who had studied the evidence included members of the "Voronezh Amateur Section for the Study of Abnormal Phenomena", who visited the site a week after the alleged event and used "a form of ESP dowsing". Regarding claims made in initial TASS reports of extraterrestrial rock found at the site, Genrikh Silanov of the Voronezh Geophysical Lab later stated it was a form of hematite commonly found in the Soviet Union, and told Socialist Industry , "don't believe all you hear from Tass. We never gave them part of what they published."

Though the area was found to have an above-average presence of the radioactive isotope cesium, vice-rector of the University of Voronezh Igor Sarotsev stated it was insignificant, saying that "the presence of a larger than normal quantity of the radioactive isotope cesium in the area of the alleged sighting did not constitute proof of a landing", noting that "after Chernobyl, this kind of phenomenon has been found in many areas".

Kurtz noted a French Press Agency report of October 28 stated, "...There exists no verifiable proof of a landing by aliens in Voronezh. Sixteen radiometric analyses, 19 checks of the ground, 9 tests for micro-organisms, and 20 spectro-chemical measurements failed to uncover "any anomaly either in the earth or surrounding vegetation".

Kurtz reported that Soviet evening news correspondent Vladimir Posner sent a film crew to Voronezh "but they could find no other "witnesses" except the children", leading Posner to suggest "that the creative imagination of young children was perhaps at work. If so, this is not unlike many UFO cases in the United States".

Regarding the wave of paranormal and UFO claims issuing from the Soviet Union in the 1980s and 1990s such as those from Voronezh, Kurtz cited a Time magazine October 23, 1989 issue that quotes a disillusioned Soviet party member who said, "They've been feeding us rubbish about the dreams of communism for years" and viewed the state sponsorship of psychic and UFO claims as "a new opiate for the masses".
