= Jean-Baptiste Boukary Lingani =

Burkinabé military officer (died 1989)

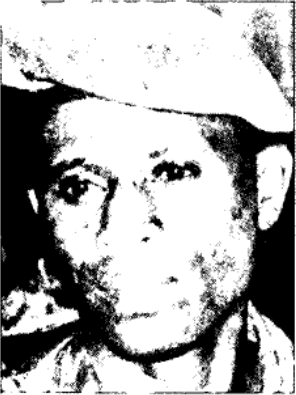
Lingani c. 1986

Major Jean-Baptiste Boukary Lingani was an officer of Army of the Republic of Upper Volta (today Burkina Faso) executed on September 19, 1989, along with Henri Zongo by Blaise Compaoré who accused them of plotting a coup. Lingani was set by Laurent Sédego, Gilbert Diendéré, Hermann Yaméogo, Issa Tiendrébeogo and his cousin Alain Ouilma of national safety department.

== Biography ==
Lingani was educated at the Prytanée militaire de Saint-Louis, a military academy in Saint-Louis, the capital of Senegal. He later became a teacher at the Prytanée militaire de Kadiogo outside of the Voltaic capital of Ouagadougou.

In 1976, when the country was led by Major General Sangoulé Lamizana, he participated in forming a secret left-wing organization within the lower officers of the Voltaic military, ROC. Other well-known members of ROC included Henri Zongo, Blaise Compaoré, and Thomas Sankara. In 1980, Lamizana – who himself had previously participated in overthrowing his predecessor – was deposed by Colonel Saye Zerbo in a military coup. A subsequent coup in 1982 against Zerbo put Major Dr. Jean-Baptiste Ouédraogo in power instead, and Lingani's comrade Thomas Sankara was made Prime Minister. This influence on the Ouédraogo regime from left-wing officers troubled the former colonial power France, and after a visit by Jean-Christophe Mitterrand Sankara, Henri Zongo and Lingani were all placed under arrest.

A popular uprising was triggered in response, and Blaise Compaoré led yet another coup, which made Sankara President. Lingani and other ROC members joined the Council of Popular Salvation, the new military junta. Sankara set about attempting to enact what he called the "Democratic and Popular Revolution" (French: Révolution démocratique et populaire), a radical transformation of society. To achieve this, new entities such as the Pioneers of the Revolution, the Committees for the Defense of the Revolution and the Popular Revolutionary Tribunals were introduced.

Jean-Baptiste Lingani served as Minister for Popular Defense and Commander-in-Chief of the Armed Forces in Sankara's cabinet. During his time as such, Burkina Faso – renamed from Upper Volta – fought Mali in the brief Second Agacher Strip War, which lasted a few weeks in December 1985.

On 15 October 1987, Thomas Sankara was assassinated by a group of soldiers, in a military coup orchestrated by Blaise Compaoré, Gilbert Diendéré. Lingani and Henri Zongo were not aware of the preparedness of the coup against Sankara - - A deterioration in relations with neighbouring countries was one of the reasons given, with Compaoré stating that Sankara jeopardised foreign relations with France and the neighbouring Ivory Coast. Compaoré succeeded Sankara as President.

Lingani remained Minister for Popular Defense and Commander-in-Chief under Compaoré, and served as acting chairman of the Popular Front during Compaoré's foreign visits. On 18 September 1989, however, during a visit by the president to China, this would change. Henri Zongo and Jean-Baptiste Lingani – along with two other officials – were arrested, charged with plotting to launch yet another military coup. Zongo and Lingani, denounced as "Fascists" by state radio, were both quickly executed. Blaise Compaoré would go on to rule Burkina Faso for two and a half decades, until his overthrow during the 2014 Burkinabé uprising.
