= Henri Zongo =

Minister of Economic Promotion, last person executed in Burkina Faso (died 1989)

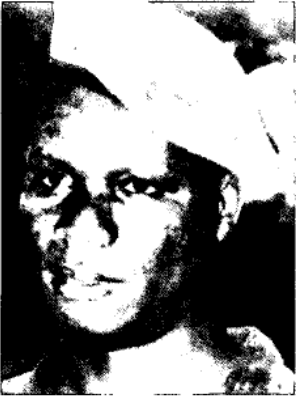
- Zongo c. 1986

Minister of Economic Promotion
- In office 4 August 1983 – 19 September 1989
- President: Thomas Sankara; Blaise Compaoré
- Succeeded by: Thomas Sanon

Sports Minister of Upper Volta
- President: Thomas Sankara

Personal details
- Died: 19 September 1989; Burkina Faso
- Cause of death: Execution by firing squad

Military service
- Allegiance: Burkina Faso
- Rank: Captain

Henri Zongo (died 19 September 1989) was a Burkinabé politician and military officer. He served as a key figure in the country's history after decolonisation: Zongo was involved in two successful coup d'états and accused of being the conspirator of a third that led to his execution.

Zongo, Thomas Sankara, Jean-Baptiste Boukary Lingani and Blaise Compaoré formed the inner core of a military group that launched the 1983 coup d'état that brought Sankara to power as president. Zongo was appointed as the Minister of Economic Promotion on 4 August 1983, a role he served until his death. Zongo also served as the Sports Minister of Upper Volta; he called for an African boycott of the 1984 Summer Olympics to protest against Britain's sporting links with South Africa, whose apartheid rule institutionalised racial segregation.

Zongo, Lingani and Compaoré then led the 1987 coup d'état that saw the overthrow of Sankara. After this overthrow, Compaoré took power at the head of a triumvirate of which Zongo and Lingani were members. Zongo and Lingani disagreed with Compaoré on economic reform issues and were accused of an attempt to overthrow the government. Zongo, Lingani and two unnamed military plotters were arrested and executed in 1989.
