= List of elections in 1965 =

The following elections occurred in 1965.

== Africa ==
- 1965 Basutoland general election
- 1965 Bechuanaland general election
- 1965 Burundian legislative election
- 1965 Cameroonian presidential election
- 1965 Democratic Republic of the Congo general election
- 1965 Ethiopian general election
- 1965 Ghanaian parliamentary election
- 1965 Ivorian general election
- 1965 Libyan general election
- 1965 Malagasy parliamentary election
- 1965 Malagasy presidential election
- 1965 Mauritanian parliamentary election
- 1965 Nigerien parliamentary election
- 1965 Nigerien presidential election
- 1965 Rhodesian general election
- 1965 Rwandan general election
- 1965 Tanzanian general election
- 1965 Sudanese parliamentary election
- 1965 Upper Voltan parliamentary election
- 1965 Upper Voltan presidential election

== Asia ==
- 1965 Afghan parliamentary election
- 1965 Ceylonese parliamentary election
- 1965 Israeli legislative election
- 1965 Israeli municipal elections
- 1965 Japanese House of Councillors election
- 1965 Pakistani general election
- 1965 Pakistani presidential election
- 1965 Philippine House of Representatives elections
- 1965 Philippine Senate election
- 1965 Philippine general election
- 1965 Philippine presidential election
- 1965 Turkish general election

== Europe ==
- 1965 Austrian presidential election
- 1965 Belgian general election
- 1965 Irish general election
- 1965 Malaysian local elections
- 1965 Norwegian parliamentary election
- 1965 Portuguese legislative election
- 1965 Portuguese presidential election
- 1965 Polish legislative election
- 1965 Romanian parliamentary election
- 1965 Swiss referendums
- 1965 Turkish general election
- 1965 West German federal election
- 1965 Yugoslavian parliamentary election

=== France ===
- 1965 French municipal elections
- 1965 French presidential election

=== United Kingdom ===
- 1965 United Kingdom local elections
- 1965 Conservative Party leadership election
- 1965 Abertillery by-election
- 1965 Altrincham and Sale by-election
- 1965 Birmingham Hall Green by-election
- 1965 Cities of London and Westminster by-election
- 1965 East Grinstead by-election
- 1965 Erith and Crayford by-election
- 1965 Hove by-election
- 1965 Leyton by-election
- 1965 Nuneaton by-election
- 1965 Roxburgh, Selkirk and Peebles by-election
- 1965 Saffron Walden by-election
- 1965 Salisbury by-election

== North America ==
=== Canada ===
- 1965 Canadian federal election
- 1965 Sudbury municipal election

=== Caribbean ===
- 1965 Antigua and Barbuda general election

=== United States ===
==== United States lieutenant gubernatorial ====
- 1965 Virginia lieutenant gubernatorial election

==== United States gubernatorial ====
- 1965 New Jersey gubernatorial election
- 1965 United States gubernatorial elections
- 1965 Virginia gubernatorial election

==== United States House of Representatives ====
- 1965 United States House of Representatives elections

==== United States mayoral elections ====
- 1965 Cleveland mayoral election
- 1965 Dallas mayoral election
- 1965 Manchester mayoral election
- 1965 New York City mayoral election
- 1965 New Orleans mayoral election
- 1965 Pittsburgh mayoral election
- 1965 Springfield, Massachusetts mayoral election

== South America ==
- 1965 Argentine legislative election
- 1965 Chilean parliamentary election
- 1965 Honduran Constituent Assembly election
- 1965 Honduran presidential election

== Oceania ==
- 1965 Cook Islands general election

=== Australia ===
- 1965 New South Wales state election
- 1965 Bondi state by-election
- 1965 Oxley state by-election
- 1965 Riverina by-election
- 1965 South Australian state election
- 1965 Western Australian state election
