= Burkina Faso coup d'état =

Burkina Faso coup d'état may refer to one of several attempted or successful coup d'états in Burkina Faso or Upper Volta:

- 1966 Upper Voltan coup d'état
- 1974 Upper Voltan coup d'état
- 1980 Upper Voltan coup d'état
- 1982 Upper Voltan coup d'état
- 1983 Upper Voltan coup d'état attempt
- 1983 Upper Voltan coup d'état
- 1987 Burkina Faso coup d'état
- 1989 Burkina Faso coup d'état attempt
- 2003 Burkina Faso coup d'état attempt
- 2014 Burkina Faso uprising
- 2015 Burkina Faso coup d'état attempt
- 2016 Burkina Faso coup d'état attempt
- January 2022 Burkina Faso coup d'état
- September 2022 Burkina Faso coup d'état
- 2023 Burkina Faso coup d'état attempt
