= 1978 Upper Voltan presidential election =

Election of Sangoulé Lamizana

- 14 May 1978 (first round); 28 May 1978 (second round)
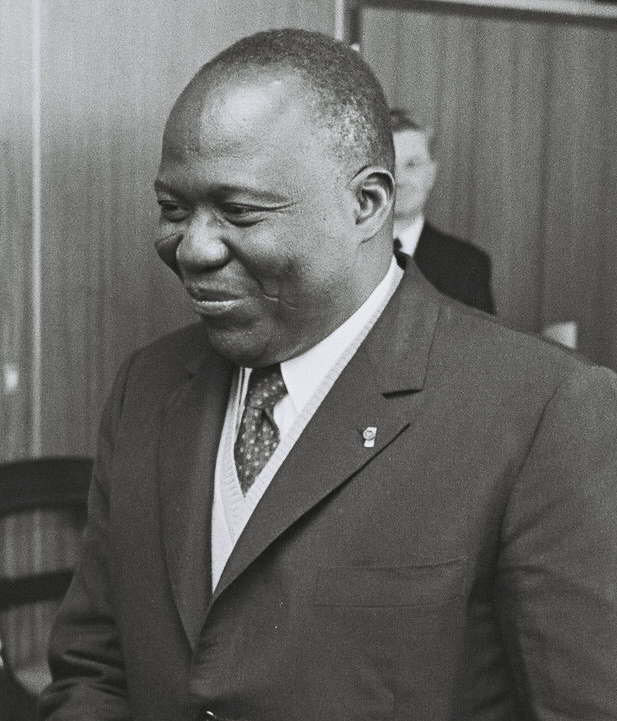
Nominee	Sangoulé Lamizana	Macaire Ouédraogo
Party	Independent (UDV–RDA)	UNDD
Popular vote	711,722	552,954
Percentage	56.28%	43.72%
President before election
Sangoulé Lamizana
Independent
Elected President
Sangoulé Lamizana
Independent

Presidential elections were held in the Republic of Upper Volta on 14 May 1978, with a second round on 28 May after no candidate won more than 50% in the first round. They were the country's first multi-party presidential elections, the previous elections in 1965 having Maurice Yaméogo as the sole candidate. They were also the first presidential elections held under a revised Constitution adopted a year earlier.

Incumbent president Sangoulé Lamizana ran as an independent with the support of the Voltaic Democratic Union–African Democratic Rally. Lamizana was the leading candidate in the first round, before winning with 56% of the vote in the second round. Voter turnout was 35% in the first round and 44% in the second.

== Background ==
In 1966, Yaméogo was ousted after a general strike in opposition to his rule, and was replaced by a provisional military government led by Lamizana. In 1970, a new Constitution was ratified, which was later revised by a referendum held in 1977. The first parliamentary elections were held under the revised Constitution on 30 April 1978, with the first round of the presidential elections being held two weeks later.

== Results ==
Candidate	Party	First round		Second round	
Candidate	Party	Votes	%	Votes	%
Sangoulé Lamizana	Independent	425,302	42.15	711,722	56.28
Macaire Ouédraogo	National Union for the Defence of Democracy	254,465	25.22	552,954	43.72
Joseph Ouédraogo	Rejectors Front–African Democratic Rally	167,160	16.57		
Joseph Ki-Zerbo	Voltaic Progressive Union	162,031	16.06		
Total		1,008,958	100.00	1,264,676	100.00
Valid votes		1,008,958	98.09	1,264,676	98.53
Invalid/blank votes		19,695	1.91	18,870	1.47
Total votes		1,028,653	100.00	1,283,546	100.00
Registered voters/turnout		2,924,785	35.17	2,947,527	43.55
Source: African Elections Database
