= 1978 Upper Voltan parliamentary election =

- 30 April 1978
- All 57 seats in the National Assembly; 29 seats needed for a majority
- Turnout: 38.32% (▼9.97pp)
Party	Leader	Vote %	Seats	+/–
UDV-RDA	Joseph Conombo	42.54	28	−9
UNDD	Hermann Yaméogo	22.87	13	New
UPV	Joseph Ki-Zerbo	15.82	9	New
PRA	Djibo Bakary	9.56	6	−6
UNI	Moussa Kargougou	7.42	1	New
This lists parties that won seats. See the complete results below.
Results by constituency
Prime Minister before	Prime Minister after
Sangoulé Lamizana; Independent	Joseph Conombo; UDV-RDA

Parliamentary elections were held in Upper Volta on 30 April 1978. They followed a constitutional referendum the previous year, which came about as a result of the 1974 military coup. A total of 367 candidates contested the elections.

The result was a victory for the Voltaic Democratic Union–African Democratic Rally, which won 28 of the 57 seats in the National Assembly. Voter turnout was just 38.3%.

The new constitution also limited the number of political parties to three, meaning that only the three largest parties in the Assembly were allowed to continue existing, resulting in the African Regroupment Party, the country's oldest party, virtually disappearing.

== Results ==
Party	Votes	%	Seats	+/–
Voltaic Democratic Union–African Democratic Rally	455,329	42.54	28	–9
National Union for the Defence of Democracy	244,754	22.87	13	New
Voltaic Progressive Union	169,331	15.82	9	New
African Regroupment Party	102,335	9.56	6	–6
National Union of Independents	79,367	7.42	1	New
Movement of PRA Independents	18,361	1.72	0	New
Popular Action Grouping	827	0.08	0	New
Total	1,070,304	100.00	57	0
Valid votes	1,070,304	95.41		
Invalid/blank votes	51,495	4.59		
Total votes	1,121,799	100.00		
Registered voters/turnout	2,927,416	38.32		
Source: Nohlen et al.
