= Zerbo =

Zerbo may refer to:

== People ==
- Fréjus Zerbo (born 1989), Ivorian basketball player
- Gabriele Zerbo (born 1994), Italian football player
- Ginella Zerbo (born 1997), Dutch field hockey player
- Jean Zerbo (born 1943), Malian Roman Catholic prelate
- Joseph Ki-Zerbo (1922–2006), Burkinabé historian, politician and writer
- Joséphine Ki-Zerbo (1936-2019), Burkina Faso educator and activist
- Lassina Zerbo (born 1963), Burkina Faso politician
- Saye Zerbo (1932–2013), Burkinabé military officer and former president

== Places ==
- Zerbo, Lombardy, village in the Province of Pavia in northern Italy
