= 1983 Upper Voltan coup attempt =

Attempted overthrow of President Jean-Baptiste Ouédraogo

1983 Upper Voltan coup d'état attempt
Date	28 February 1983
Location	Ouagadougou, Upper Volta
Result	Government victory

Belligerents
Council of Popular Salvation; Communist Officers' Group	Military Committee of Recovery for National Progress

Commanders and leaders
Jean-Baptiste Ouédraogo; Thomas Sankara	Saye Zerbo

The 1983 Upper Voltan coup d'état attempt took place on 28 February 1983, in the Republic of Upper Volta (today Burkina Faso), just a few months after a previous coup d'état on 7 November 1982 by radical elements of the army against the regime of Colonel Saye Zerbo, who himself came to power in a 1980 coup against Major General Sangoulé Lamizana.

The coup attempt on 28 February, which targeted the Council of Popular Salvation (CPS) and its leader Major Jean-Baptiste Ouédraogo, failed.

== Events ==
Several army officers intended to massacre the CPS in assembly and restore Zerbo's regime. However, they were arrested by other officials. One of the leading putschists was a commandant who had been considered for the presidency following the 1982 coup. When questioned about the incident, Ouédraogo told the press, "Since our regime makes many people uneasy, it is quite normal that people should plan this sort of reaction." He publicly declared his determination to "guarantee order and security" and asserted that "the army will not allow itself to be dissuaded by tribal fights and ideologies". He also stated that corruption and fraud in the business community had, in part, facilitated the state of "total anarchy" over which the government presided, and announced that the national administration would be restructured to mitigate the disorder.

== See also ==
- 1983 Upper Voltan coup d'état
- History of Burkina Faso
