= 1974 Upper Voltan coup d'état =

1974 self-coup in Upper Volta

Date	8 February 1974
Location	Ouagadougou, Republic of Upper Volta
Result	Coup attempt succeeds

Belligerents
(Republic of Upper Volta) Upper Volta: RDA	Upper Voltan Armed Forces

Commanders and leaders
(Republic of Upper Volta) Gérard Kango Ouédraogo; Prime Minister of Upper Volta (Republic of Upper Volta) Joseph Ouédraogo; President of the National Assembly	Gen. Sangoulé Lamizana; President of Upper Volta

The 1974 Upper Voltan coup d'état was a bloodless military coup which took place in the Republic of Upper Volta on 8 February 1974.

The coup was effectively a self-coup, orchestrated by President General Sangoulé Lamizana (in office since the 1966 coup), against the RDA-led government of Prime Minister Gérard Kango Ouédraogo, formed following the 1970 parliamentary election.

Lamizana announced the dissolution of the National Assembly and the suspension of the Constitution, adopted following the 1970 constitutional referendum. He subsequently appointed himself as the new prime minister, in a government comprising 11 military officers and 4 civilians.

== See also ==
- History of Burkina Faso
