= Alfred Diban Ki-Zerbo =

Burkinabe catechist considered as the first Christian of Upper Volta

Alfred Simon Diban Ki-Zerbo
- Born: Diban Ki-Zerbo; 1875; Da, Burkina Faso
- Died: May 10, 1980 (aged 104–105)
- Occupation: Catechist
- Children: Joseph Ki-Zerbo

Alfred Simon Diban Ki-Zerbo (c. 1875 – May 10, 1980) was a Burkinabe catechist considered the "First Christian of Upper Volta". According to Monsignor Zéphyrin Toé, he was the leader of 500,000 Christians in northwestern Africa.

== Life ==
Diban Ki-Zerbo was born around 1875 in Da, near the town of Tougan in the south of Samo country (now in Burkina Faso). At the age of 17, when he was going with his brother to work in the fields of one of his uncles, the two young men were captured by strangers and sold separately as slaves in the market of Kabara (now Mali). Diban Ki-Zerbo never saw his brother again. Diban Ki-Zerbo tried twice to escape, to no avail, while remembering a proverb of his clan:

"When a man is struck on his head, the coward lowers his head, the brave raises his head".

Recaptured twice, the teenager suffered increasingly inhumane treatment from his master. Diban Ki-Zerbo was not discouraged and tried to escape for the third time in 1899. He recounted having been supported in this third escape by a "young woman full of light" whom he later, as a Catholic, would identify as an earthly manifestation of Mary. This experience, conceived by Ki-Zerbo as a miracle, caused him to develop a great devotion for the figure of the virgin that accompanied him until the end of his days.

After his successful escape, he was welcomed by some white priests from the church of Ségou, whose superior was Abbé Augustin Hacquard. Ki-Zerbo was baptized on 6 May 1901 with the Christian name of Alfred Simon and will soon join the Catholic mission to spread his new faith. He soon became a catechist and started to preach in the Mossi country.

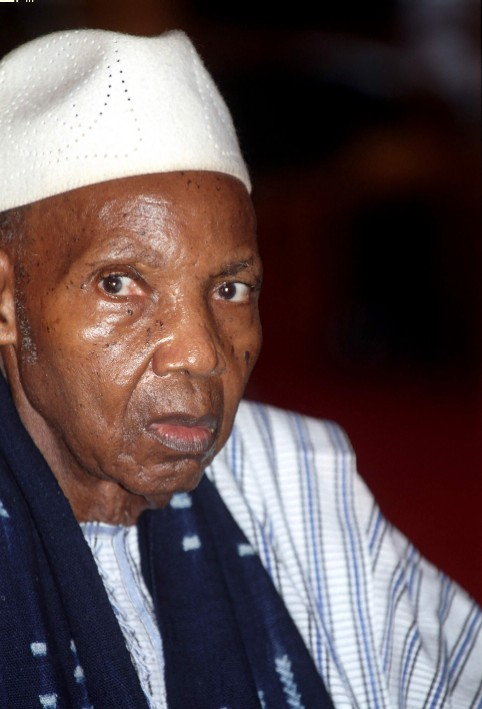
Joseph Ki-Zerbo, Alfred Simon Diban Ki-Zerbo's son

In 1914, the Great War broke out in Europe and the conflict spread to the belligerents' colonial domains in Africa. In 1916, during the Volta-Bani War, the white priests sent Alfred Simon to his family in Toma, where he would be safer, and then took refuge in Ouagadougou. Alfred Simon Diban Ki-Zerbo, despite his Catholic faith, remained polygamous, marrying twice and having a large number of children. Among many of them is the Burkinabe historian and socialist politician Joseph Ki-Zerbo, husband of Jacqueline Coulibaly.

In 1975, the centenarian Alfred Diban Ki-Zerbo made a pilgrimage to Rome accompanied by Cardinal Paul Zoungrana. He appeared before Pope Paul VI who, out of respect for old age as well as for the action of the old man and beyond the ceremonial, gave him his place on the pontifical throne. In 1980, Diban Ki-Zerbo was hospitalized. John Paul II, on a pastoral trip to Africa, sent him his blessing. From his hospital bed, Alfred Ki-Zerbo listened to the radio broadcasting the Mass celebrated in Ouagadougou on 10 May 1980 by the sovereign pontiff. Ki-Zerbo is said to have passed away as the Pope pronounced the final blessing. Having been baptized under Leo XIII and died under John Paul II, Alfred Diban Ki-Zerbo lived under the reigns of all the popes of the 20th century.
