= 1948 Upper Volta by-election =

A by-election to the French National Assembly was held in Upper Volta on 27 June 1948, alongside Territorial Assembly elections. The election was held following the separation of the territory of Upper Volta from Ivory Coast, which created a new constituency. The Voltaic Union won all three seats, which were taken by Henri Guissou, Mamadou Ouédraogo and Nazi Boni.

== Results ==
Party	Votes	%	Seats
Voltaic Union	71,304	82.13	3
Independent Union	15,515	17.87	0
Total	86,819	100.00	3
Valid votes	86,819	99.43	
Invalid/blank votes	499	0.57	
Total votes	87,318	100.00	
Registered voters/turnout	140,339	62.22	
Source: Sternberger et al.
