= National Union of Independents (Upper Volta) =

The National Union of Independents (French: Union Nationale des Indépendants, UNI) was a political party in the Republic of Upper Volta (present-day Burkina Faso), led by Moussa Kargougou.

== History ==
The UNI was established in 1973 as a breakaway from the African Democratic Rally. Although it was banned in 1974 following a military coup, it was revived prior to the 1978 parliamentary elections, with Kargougou having been appointed as Foreign Minister in 1977.

The party received 7% of the vote in the elections, winning a single seat, which was taken by Kargougou.
