= Party of Independents (Upper Volta) =

Political party in Upper Volta

Party of Independents Parti des Indépendants
- Split from: Voltaic Democratic Union
- Headquarters: Upper Volta

Party of Independents (French: Parti des Indépendents) was a political party in Upper Volta (known as Burkina Faso since August 1984). The party was formed through a split in the Voltaic Democratic Union (UDV-RDA). The party contested the 1970 elections.
