= Republican Party for Liberty =

Republican Party for Liberty Parti Républicain pour la Liberté
- Founder: Nazi Boni
- Founded: 8 October 1959
- Dissolved: 6 January 1960
- Preceded by: Parti national voltaïque
- Continental affiliation: PRA

The Republican Party for Liberty (French: Parti Républicain pour la Liberté, PRL) was a political party in Upper Volta (now Burkina Faso). The PRL was founded in 1959 by Nazi Boni as a reaction to the attempts by the Voltaic Democratic Union to create a one-party state. Boni built his new party largely out of the ashes of the defunct African Regroupment Party (PRA).

PRL was short-lived and failed to make any major impact. Boni went into exile in Dakar, Senegal.
