= 1983 Upper Voltan coup d'état =

Coup that brought Thomas Sankara to power

Date	4 August 1983
Location	Ouagadougou, Upper Volta
Result	Revolutionary victory; Thomas Sankara installed as the President of Upper Volta

Belligerents
Government of Upper Volta: Conservative armed forces faction	Left-wing armed forces faction

Commanders and leaders
Jean-Baptiste Ouédraogo	Thomas Sankara; Blaise Compaoré

Strength
	250 paratroopers Armed civilians

Casualties and losses
- 13 killed, 15 wounded

On 4 August 1983, a coup d'état was launched in the Republic of Upper Volta (today Burkina Faso) in an event sometimes referred to as the August revolution (French: Révolution d'août) or Burkinabé revolution. It was carried out by radical elements of the army led by Thomas Sankara and Blaise Compaoré, against the regime of Major Jean-Baptiste Ouédraogo. Ouédraogo had been brought to power in a 1982 coup with the Conseil de Salut du Peuple (CSP), a body composed of military officials of different ideological backgrounds. The CSP chose Sankara as Prime Minister of Upper Volta in January 1983. As his tenure progressed, Ouédraogo found himself unable to reconcile the conservative and radical factions of the CSP, whose disagreements were leading to a political stalemate. On 16 May he purged his government of pro-Libyan and anti-French elements, disbanded the CSP, and had Sankara and several other important officials arrested. This move sparked discontent among Sankara's supporters. Sankara was eventually released while one officer, Compaoré, began to organise military resistance to the government.

Tensions continued to increase until 4 August when Compaoré launched a coup, leading 250 paratroopers in a march on the capital, Ouagadougou. Sankara attempted to broker a political compromise with Ouédraogo, but Compaoré's troops seized the city before this was done and captured Ouédraogo. Sankara became the new president of Upper Volta and created the Conseil National de la Revolution (CNR), a new governing body consisting mostly of populist junior officers.

== Background ==
=== 1982 coup and the CSP ===
In 1980 Colonel Saye Zerbo took control of the Republic of Upper Volta in a coup. He installed a mixed military-civilian regime which over time marginalised both the older, conservative senior officers and younger, radical left-wing junior officers in the army. On 7 November 1982 the conservative and left-wing factions united under conservative Colonel Gabriel Somé Yorian launched a coup which ousted Zerbo. The soldiers then formed the Conseil de Salut du Peuple (Note: Council of the Salvation of the People) (CSP), a 120-strong governing body consisting of officers, noncommissioned officers, and privates. Two days later the council elected Major Jean-Baptiste Ouédraogo as president. He was a compromise choice between the left-wing radicals and conservatives on the CSP. According to Ouédraogo, radical Captain Thomas Sankara was supposed to take power but withdrew at the last minute, leading other officers to choose him to assume the presidency due to his senior rank though, in his words, "against my will". Unlike Sankara, he lacked political experience and popular support, and was quickly regarded by the left-wing members of the CSP as conservative and sympathetic to policies of France. Nevertheless, the media viewed Ouédraogo and Sankara as united in goals and dubbed them "Siamese twins".

On 21 November Ouédraogo declared that the CSP would restore a constitutional, civilian regime in two years time. Five days later the CSP installed a formal government. Ouédraogo was the only soldier in the cabinet and, in addition to his role as president, was made Minister of National Defence and Veterans Affairs. On the whole the CSP exercised true control of the government while Ouédraogo served as little more than a figurehead. The freedoms of labour unions and the press, having been restricted under Zerbo's reign, were restored by the new administration. The CSP elected Sankara as Prime Minister in January 1983, in effect instituting a power counterbalance to Ouédraogo.

=== Tensions between Ouédraogo and Sankara ===
Meanwhile, as Sankara toured various communist and socialist countries, rumors circulated among the Voltaic population that the CSP would assume a radical left-wing approach to governing and expropriate small businesses. In an attempt to alleviate concerns, Ouédraogo told members of the National Council of Voltaic Employers that "private initiative will be maintained...you are the primary motor of the country's economic activity". Sankara concluded his tour with a visit to Libya. A Libyan transport aircraft landed at Ouagadougou Airport shortly after his return, generating rumours of a plot to install a pro-Libya regime in Upper Volta. Ouédraogo assured the populace that it was "a routine visit, a kind of courtesy call and I think that we must not try to see anything beyond that," and stated that "there should be no talk of setting up a Voltaic Jamahiriya". On 26 March Ouédraogo and Sankara held a meeting in the capital, where differences in their beliefs began to emerge. That day the CSP organised a large rally in the city where a moderate speech by Ouédraogo was much less enthusiastically received than Sankara's radical remarks.

As his tenure progressed, Ouédraogo found himself unable to reconcile the conservative and radical factions of the CSP, whose disagreements were leading to a political stalemate. On 14 May 1983 the CSP convened in the town of Bobo-Dioulasso. A crowd gathered to hear a message from the council. Sankara spoke until dusk, and the crowd mostly dispersed, its members eager to break their Ramadan fasts. Ouédraogo was in turn left without an audience for his speech, as Sankara seemingly intended in an effort to humiliate him. The following day he met with Guy Penne, a top African affairs adviser of President of France François Mitterrand. On 16 May he purged his government of pro-Libyan and anti-French elements, disbanded the CSP, and had Sankara and several other important officials arrested. (Note: According to Sankara, the two met earlier that day to discuss their differences, but were unable to reach an understanding and thus "separated themselves from being Siamese twins".) Explaining the reasons for the radicals' removal, he said, "It is a problem of ideology...We were following step by step the program of the [Ligue patriotique pour le développement], and that program was to lead us to a communist society." (Note: The motives for Ouédraogo's decision are not agreed upon. Some observers attribute the coup to growing pressure from France, while others state that Ouédraogo and the conservatives in the military acted over dissatisfaction with Sankara's relationship with Libya. According to one account, Somé Yorian had schemed with Penne to remove Sankara. On the morning of 16 May soldiers surrounded Sankara's and Ouédraogo's residences. Somé told Ouédraogo he could dismiss Sankara or be removed from office, and the president assented.) He met again with Penne, who promised his government significant financial aid from France. One officer, Blaise Compaoré, evaded capture and escaped to Sankara's former garrison at Pô where he began to organise resistance. In the following days large demonstrations occurred in Ouagadougou in support of Sankara. Ouédraogo's political position was weak; his left-wing opponents were well organised while he did not have reliable connections with the conservative factions he supposedly represented and could only really count on the support of a handful of his former classmates from the Pabré minor seminary. Realising that the use of force was of little recourse, he sought to resolve the situation by appeasing his adversaries.

On 27 May Ouédraogo delivered a speech, promising a quick return to civilian rule and the liberation of political prisoners. He also announced the drafting of a new constitution within six months, to be followed by an election in which he would not participate. He also felt that the increased politicisation of the army was dangerous and compounded the threat of a civil war, so he warned that any soldiers found to be involving themselves in politics would be reprimanded. Stating that the older generation of politicians had been discredited and should retire, he announced that "patriots" and "new men with a sense of responsibility and national realities" should assume leadership of the country. Ouédraogo finished by expressing his hope that the Upper Voltan youth could avoid the trappings of partisan politics. Several days later he released Sankara, who was confined under guard to house arrest. While the situation deteriorated, Ouédraogo accelerated the execution of his goals, liberating many political prisoners held under Zerbo's regime. However, his extension of political rehabilitation to Yaméogo antagonised many politicians whom Yaméogo had repressed. Sankara was soon rearrested but then released following mounting pressure from Compaoré's troops. On 4 June Ouédraogo removed a number of pro-Sankara ministers from his government.

== Coup ==
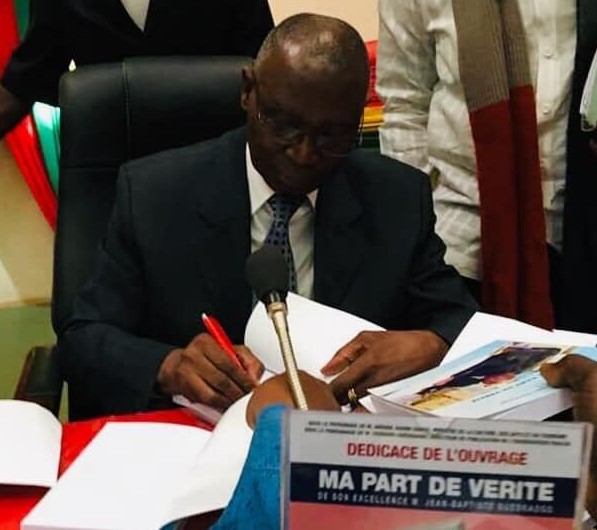
Ouédraogo (pictured in 2020) was ousted by the coup.

Tensions continued to increase until 4 August when Compaoré launched a coup. According to some accounts, Compaoré's forces were moved to act when they received reports that Somé Yorian was planning on deposing Ouédraogo, seizing power, and killing Sankara and his allies. Compaoré mobilised 250 paratroopers in Pô to march on Ouagadougou. They left in the afternoon with a group of armed civilians and seized trucks from a Canadian construction company, allowing them to make quick progress. Meanwhile, Ouédraogo consulted his chief of staff, who advised him to negotiate an end to his political conflict with Sankara. Ouédraogo received Sankara at 19:00 at his residence and offered to resign "to facilitate the establishment of a transitional government that would be unanimous". Sankara agreed to the proposal but asked for a few hours' delay so he could discuss it with Compaoré. He departed at 20:30 but was unable to inform Compaoré or the other putschists of the truce. At around the same time the paratroopers infiltrated the capital and began to seize strategic locations throughout, mounting attacks on the radio station, Camp Guillame—home to the army's armoured detachment, and the gendarmerie headquarters. Civilians aided the putschists by providing them with directions and severing electric lines in the capital.

At Ouédraogo's residence, men of the Presidential Guard exchanged heavy fire with the putschists before surrendering. Compaoré arrived on the scene at around 22:00, followed by Sankara an hour later. The latter informed Ouédraogo of the "revolution" and offered to exile him and his family. Ouédraogo replied that he would rather remain in the country under the new regime. He was then taken to the Presidential Palace to spend the night. The putsch reportedly left 13 people killed and 15 wounded, including six French civilians.

Sankara became the new president of Upper Volta. He created a Conseil National de la Revolution (CNR), a governing body consisting mostly of populist junior officers, as well as members of the Ligue patriotique pour le développement and the Union des Luttes Communistes. He gave a speech on national radio declaring the overthrow of the CSP, saying that the purpose of the coup was to "transfer [...] power from the hands of the Voltaic bourgeoise allied with imperialism into the hands of the alliance of popular classes that make up the people." He also declared that the CNR would "liquidate imperialist domination" and asked the public to form "Committees for the Defense of the Revolution" to aid in this endeavor. The speech was broadcast several times in French, Mooré, and Gurunsi. A brief curfew was imposed, Ouagadougou Airport was closed, and the borders were sealed.

== Aftermath ==
=== Fate of Ouédraogo ===
Sankara pledged to afford Ouédraogo "much humanitarianism". On the evening of 5 August the former president was imprisoned at the military camp in Pô. He was discharged from the army on 25 August. Ouédraogo was granted clemency on 4 August 1985 and returned to medical work, taking a job at the Hôpital Yalgado-Ouédraogo. Nevertheless, the Sankara regime monitored his activities and restricted him from reentry into the army. Ouédraogo declared that he would not take an active role in politics and from then on he generally showed little interest in involving himself in public affairs. In 2020 he released a memoir titled Ma part de vérité, in which he offered criticism of Sankara. In response to backlash from the book, he said of Sankara, "there were only political grievances between us, no animosity".

=== Foreign reactions ===
The Libyan official news agency, Jamahiriya News Agency, praised the coup. On 6 August Libyan leader Muammar Gaddafi extended his formal congratulations to Sankara and dispatched a plane with aid to Upper Volta. The coup came at a time when Libyan involvement in conflict in Chad was increasing, generating worries among the governments of Niger and the Ivory Coast that the overthrow was a move planned by Gaddafi. In an interview with a French radio station, Sankara stated, "I regret that we are considered pawns of Gaddafi. Colonel Gaddafi is a chief of state who has been able to solve the problems of his country. But Libya is not Upper Volta and Captain Sankara is not Colonel Gaddafi. There is surely a lot to learn in Libya, but we can't copy their experiences and that's why we can't speak of pawns." In a measure to assuage concerns, Sankara sent a message to Ivory Coast President Félix Houphouët-Boigny, expressing a wish to "consolidate the traditional friendship and cooperation" between their countries. He also asked the Libyan government to withhold further flights. The new regime cultivated friendly relations with Libya, Ghana, the Soviet Union, and Albania, while France and the United States progressively ignored it.

=== CNR governance ===
The day following the coup, the CNR issued a decree, reorganising the country into 30 provinces. On 9 August Sankara dismissed Ouédraogo's cabinet, asking top civil servants to take charge of their ministries until new ministers could be appointed. Compaoré later became minister of state at the presidency and the de facto second-most powerful political leader in the country. The military general staff was dissolved and replaced with a new high command under Major Jean-Baptiste Boukary Lingani. That night, conservative soldiers attempted a counter coup, launching a tripartite attack in Ouagadougou against Sankara's residence, a radio station, and the place where Somé Yorian and a paratrooper commander, Fidele Guebre, were being held. Two of Sankara's guards were wounded, while Somé Yorian and Guebre were shot while trying to escape. A nighttime curfew remained in effect for several months after the coup, and foreigners who visited the country were searched and questioned on their intentions.

Sankara declared that the goals of his "revolution" would be to counter imperialism, stem corruption, heighten the status of women, conserve the environment, and improve access to education and health care. On the first anniversary of the coup, he changed Upper Volta's name to "Burkina Faso", roughly translating from the Mooré and Dyula languages as the "land of upright people". During his tenure he pushed programs which improved literacy and school attendance rates, increased women's positions in government, ameliorated infant mortality, and promoted reforestation. Over the course of his tenure, economic difficulties engendered popular opposition and disagreement within his government, as did conservatives' objections to his progressive platform. On 15 October 1987, Compaoré launched a successful coup in which Sankara was killed. Compaoré led Burkina Faso until 2014, when widespread unrest led him to resign and flee the country.

== See also ==
- History of Burkina Faso

== Works cited ==
- "Babies Not Barracks Ex-President". Africa Analysis. 2 (13–37). London: Africa Analysis Limited. 11 December 1987. ISSN 0950-902X.
- Emerson, Stephen A. (1991). Regime change as an indicator of political instability in Africa and the Middle East, 1979-1985 (PhD thesis). University of Florida. OCLC 25350800. ProQuest 304006682.
- Englebert, Pierre (2018). Burkina Faso: Unsteady Statehood In West Africa. New York: Routledge. ISBN 9780429981562.
- Harsch, Ernest (2014). Thomas Sankara: An African Revolutionary (illustrated, reprint ed.). Athens: Ohio University Press. ISBN 9780821445075.
- Kandeh, J. (2004). Coups from Below: Armed Subalterns and State Power in West Africa. Springer. ISBN 9781403978776.
- Ouédraogo, Édouard (1996). Voyage de la Haute-Volta au Burkina Faso [Journey from Upper Volta to Burkina Faso] (in French). Ouagadougou: Éditions Paalga. OCLC 37811810.
- "Ouedraogo's African tour". West Africa. London: West Africa Publishing Company Limited: 1091. 2 May 1983. ISSN 0043-2962.
- "President Will Stand Down". Africa Research Bulletin. Economic, Financial and Technical Series. Exeter: Blackwell: 6840. 1983. OCLC 933316914.
- Quarterly Economic Review of Ivory Coast, Togo, Benin, Niger, Upper Volta. London: Economist Intelligence Unit Limited. 1983. ISSN 0142-4513.
- "Recent Unsuccessful Coup Attempt Explained". West Africa. London: Afrimedia International: 770–771. 28 March 1983. ISSN 0043-2962.
- Rupley, Lawrence; Bangali, Lamissa; Diamitani, Boureima (2013). Historical Dictionary of Burkina Faso (revised ed.). Lanham: Rowman & Littlefield. ISBN 9780810867703.
- Savonnet-Guyot, Claudette (1986). État et sociétés au Burkina: essai sur le politique africain [State and Societies in Burkina: Essay on African Politics]. Hommes et sociétés (in French). Vol. 27. Paris: Karthala. ISBN 9782865371488.
- Skinner, Elliott Percival (1989). The Mossi of Burkina Faso: Chiefs, Politicians and Soldiers (revised ed.). Prospect Heights: Waveland Press. ISBN 9780881333985.
- Skinner, Elliot P. (September 1988). "Sankara and the Burkinabe Revolution: Charisma and Power, Local and External Dimensions". The Journal of Modern African Studies. 26 (3). Cambridge University Press: 437–455. doi:10.1017/S0022278X0001171X. ISSN 0022-278X. JSTOR 160892. S2CID 154453966.
- "Upper Volta Junta Pledges Civilian Rule In Two Years". Africa News. 19. Durham: Africa News Service: 20. 1982. ISSN 0191-6521.
- Wood, Michael (October 1983). "Upper Volta: Another Piece in Qaddafi's Puzzle?". The World Today. 39 (10): 364–368. JSTOR 40395436.
