= 1982 Upper Voltan coup d'état =

1982 military coup in present-day Burkina Faso

Date	7 November 1982
Location	Upper Volta
Result	Coup successful, government overthrown and replaced

Belligerents
(Republic of Upper Volta) Military Committee of Recovery for National Progress	Council of Popular Salvation; Communist Officers' Group; Supported by: Trade unions

Commanders and leaders
Saye Zerbo	Gabriel Somé Yorian; Jean-Baptiste Ouédraogo; Thomas Sankara; Blaise Compaoré; Henri Zongo; Jean-Baptiste Boukary Lingani

The 1982 Upper Voltan coup d'état took place in the Republic of Upper Volta (today Burkina Faso) on 7 November 1982. The coup, led by Colonel Gabriel Somé Yorian and a slew of other junior officers within the military, many of them political radicals, overthrew the regime of Colonel Saye Zerbo. Zerbo had previously taken power just under two years prior to his own downfall.

== Background ==
Upper Volta, formerly a colony of France, had gone through several coups since independence in 1960. In 1966, the single-party dictatorship of President Maurice Yaméogo had been ended by strong opposition from the powerful trade unions and the 1966 Upper Voltan coup d'état, and his military successor President Sangoulé Lamizana was overthrown in the 1980 Upper Voltan coup d'état after a long period of labour unrest, famine and economic problems.

After overthrowing Lamizana, Colonel Saye Zerbo re-established the full-on military rule ended by Lamizana with the 1978 presidential and parliamentary elections. Initially favoured by the trade unions and much of the political opposition, he soon made them his enemies. Establishing a junta with many radical members, the Military Committee of Recovery for National Progress (which included later presidents Thomas Sankara and Blaise Compaoré, and their close friend Henri Zongo), Zerbo's leadership grew increasingly dictatorial. He re-banned all political parties, and once more made labour strikes illegal. The trade unions reacted poorly. Factional infighting soon grew within the junta, and on 12 April 1982 Thomas Sankara (secretary of state for information), Blaise Compaoré and Henri Zongo resigned from the Military Committee of Recovery for National Progress. The three were subsequently arrested.

Anti-Zerbo protests grew increasingly frequent, with anti-government strikes taking place in April, the trade unions demanding a return to constitutional government in May, and several prominent union and opposition leaders arrested in September.

== Coup ==
On 7 November 1982, the progressive and radical factions within the military regime had had enough with Saye Zerbo. Among them were the "Communist Officers' Group", a clandestine movement formed by Sankara, Compaoré, Zongo and Jean-Baptiste Boukary Lingani. In the capital Ouagadougou, the army chief of staff Colonel Gabriel Somé Yorian and other officers calling themselves the Council of Popular Salvation moved to depose and arrest Zerbo. Zerbo was declared a lying demagogue who had betrayed the confidence of his people.

Two days after the coup, the little-known army physician Major Dr. Jean-Baptiste Ouédraogo was named head of state by the new junta. Yorian remained chief of staff. The Council of Popular Salvation made several moves over the next few weeks, firing old high-ranking Lamizana-era military officials and legalizing the major trade unions.

== Aftermath ==
President Ouédraogo's leadership wouldn't continue for long. He survived a 28 February 1983 coup attempt, but after arresting his newly appointed Prime Minister Thomas Sankara – and several other members of the Communist Officers' Group – he was hit by a surge in protests, followed by a military uprising led by Blaise Compaoré. On 4 August 1983 he was finally deposed in a coup organized by Compaoré, which freed Sankara and made him President. This began the "Burkinabé Revolution", a process in which Sankara and his new junta attempted to radically transform Upper Volta – soon renamed "Burkina Faso" – according to left-wing revolutionary principles.

Sankara would himself be overthrown in 1987 by his old friend Compaoré, who remained in power until the 2014 Burkinabé uprising.

== See also ==
- History of Burkina Faso
