= Voltaic Democratic Party =

French Upper Voltan political party

The Voltaic Democratic Party–African Democratic Rally (French: Parti Démocratique Voltaïque–Rassemblement Démocratique Africain, PDV-RDA) was a political party in French Upper Volta.

== History ==
The party was established as the Upper Voltan branch of the African Democratic Rally in 1946 by Djibril Vinama and Ali Barraud, supported by Daniel Ouezzin Coulibaly. It drew its support from young, educated residents of the western area of the territory who opposed the powers of the traditional chiefs.

In the Territorial Assembly elections in 1952 the party finished third to the Voltaic Union and the Rally of the French People.

In 1956 the party merged with the Social Party for the Emancipation of the African Masses to form the Unified Democratic Party.
