= 1951 French legislative election in Upper Volta =

Elections to the French National Assembly were held in Upper Volta on 17 June 1951, as part of the wider French elections. The Voltaic Union (UV) won three of the four seats, which were taken by Joseph Conombo, Henri Guissou, Mamadou Ouédraogo, whilst Nazi Boni won the other seat on the Economic and Social Action in the Interests of Upper Volta list, although he remained a member of the UV.

== Results ==
Party	Votes	%	Seats
Voltaic Union	146,861	58.76	3
Economic and Social Action in the Interests of Upper Volta	66,986	26.80	1
Voltaic Evolution	16,980	6.79	0
Entente Voltaïque	11,725	4.69	0
Voltaic Progressive Movement	7,388	2.96	0
Total	249,940	100.00	4
Valid votes	249,940	99.52	
Invalid/blank votes	1,198	0.48	
Total votes	251,138	100.00	
Registered voters/turnout	334,149	75.16	
Source: Sternberger et al.
