= 1970 Upper Voltan parliamentary election =

- 20 December 1970
- All 57 seats in the National Assembly; 29 seats needed for a majority
- Turnout: 48.29%
Party	Leader	Vote %	Seats	+/–
UDV-RDA	Gérard Kango Ouédraogo	67.68	37	−38
PRA	Djibo Bakary	17.25	12	New
MLN	Joseph Ki-Zerbo	10.96	6	New
PIK	–	0.74	2	New
This lists parties that won seats. See the complete results below.
Results by constituency
Prime Minister before	Prime Minister after
Position established	Gérard Kango Ouédraogo; UDV-RDA

Parliamentary elections were held in the Republic of Upper Volta on 20 December 1970, following the restoration of multi-party democracy in a referendum earlier in the year. The result was a victory for the former sole legal party, the Voltaic Democratic Union–African Democratic Rally, which won 37 of the 57 seats in the National Assembly. Voter turnout was 48.3%.

== Results ==
Party	Votes	%	Seats	+/–
Voltaic Democratic Union–African Democratic Rally	753,166	67.68	37	–38
African Regroupment Party	191,980	17.25	12	New
National Liberation Movement	121,942	10.96	6	New
Kaya Independent Party	8,278	0.74	2	New
Union for the New Republic	6,540	0.59	0	New
Yatenga Independent Party	6,064	0.54	0	New
Koupela Independent Party	2,873	0.26	0	New
Others	22,040	1.98	0	New
Total	1,112,883	100.00	57	–18
Valid votes	1,112,883	96.21		
Invalid/blank votes	43,814	3.79		
Total votes	1,156,697	100.00		
Registered voters/turnout	2,395,226	48.29		
Source: IPU
