= Nazi Boni =

Politician in Upper Volta (1909–1969)

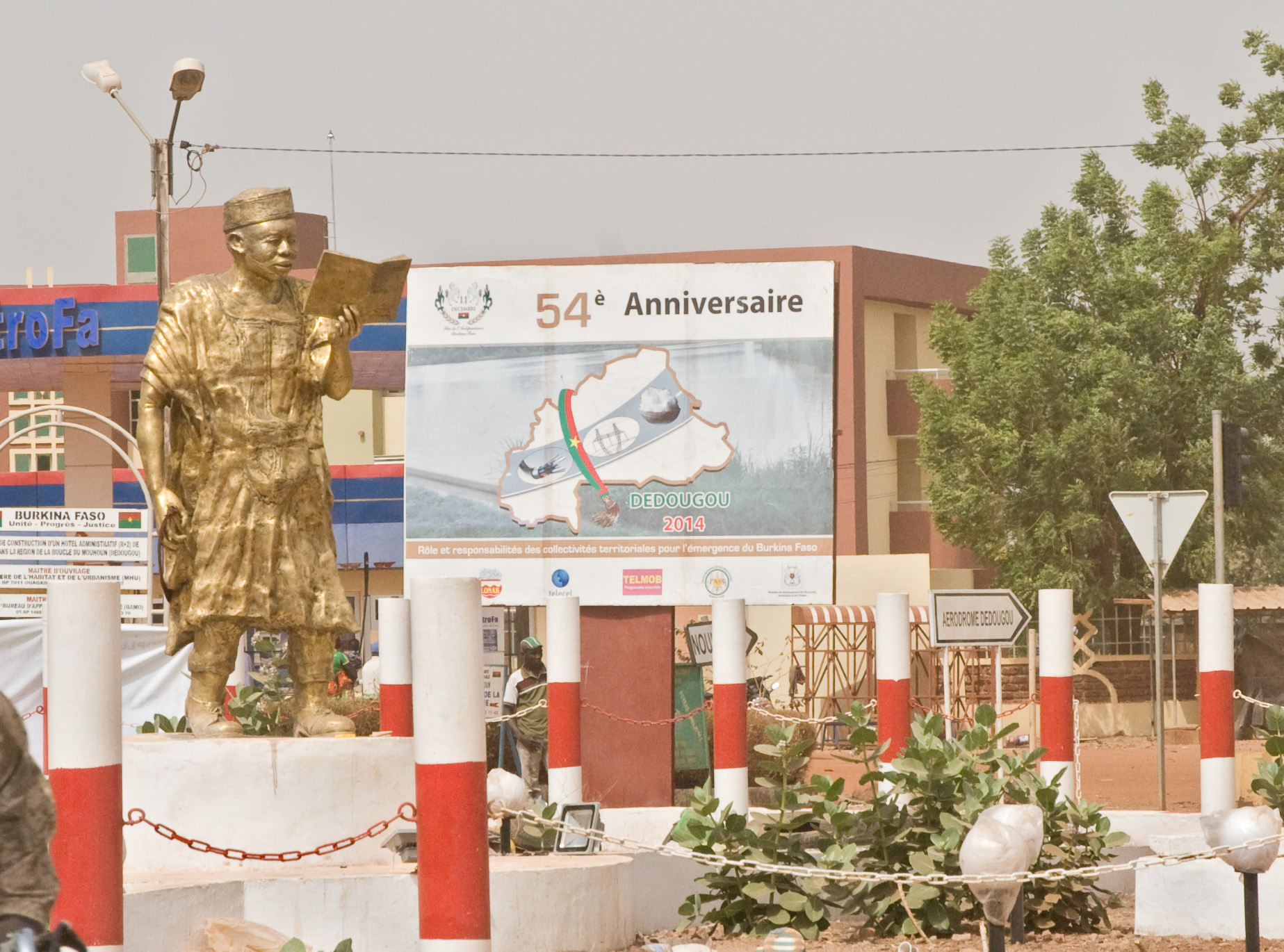
- Monument for Nazi Boni in Dédougou

Member of Parliament of the National Assembly
- In office 27 June 1948 – 15 July 1959

Personal details
- Born: Between 1909 and 1912 Bouan, Bondokuy, Upper Volta
- Died: 16 June 1969 Ouagadougou, Upper Volta
- Party: Voltaic Union; African Popular Movement; African Convention; Republican Party for Liberty
- Education: École William Ponty

Nazi Boni (December 31, 1909, in Bwan, Upper Senegal and Niger – May 16, 1969, in Kokologho, Upper Volta) was a politician from Upper Volta (now Burkina Faso).

== Biography ==
In 1948 Boni was elected to the French National Assembly on behalf of the Voltaic Union (UV), and was re-elected in 1951 running on the Economic and Social Action in the Interests of Upper Volta list, although he remained a UV member. In 1955 Boni founded the African Popular Movement (MPA) after a split from the UV. In January 1957, Boni's MPA took part in the founding of the African Convention, a pan-African party that later merged into the African Regroupment Party.

From December 1957 to February 1958 Boni served as President of the Territorial Assembly. In 1959 he founded a new party, the Republican Party for Liberty, in opposition to the attempts to make Upper Volta a one-party state under the Voltaic Democratic Union. Boni was forced into exile in Dakar, Senegal.

In 1962, Boni wrote a novel, Le Crépuscule des temps anciens (The Twilight of the Bygone Days), which explored the precolonial existence of the Bwa people and the Volta-Bani War.
