= 1959 Upper Voltan Territorial Assembly election =

Territorial Assembly elections were held in the Republic of Upper Volta on 19 April 1959. The result was a victory for the African Democratic Rally, which won 62 of the 75 seats in the Assembly. Voter turnout was 46.9%.

== Results ==
Party	Votes	%	Seats
African Democratic Rally	502,815	56.21	62
African Regroupment Party	391,709	43.79	13
Total	894,524	100.00	75
Valid votes	894,524	99.03	
Invalid/blank votes	8,766	0.97	
Total votes	903,290	100.00	
Registered voters/turnout	1,924,765	46.93	
Source: Nohlen et al.
