= 1952 Upper Voltan Territorial Assembly election =

Territorial Assembly elections were held in French Upper Volta on 30 March 1952. The result was a victory for the Voltaic Union (UV).

== Electoral system ==
The Territorial Assembly had 50 seats, with 10 elected by the First College (French citizens) and 40 by the Second College (non-French citizens).

== Results ==
Party	First College			Second College			Total seats
Party	Votes	%	Seats	Votes	%	Seats	Total seats
Voltaic Union				122,817	–	13	13
Social and Economic Action				45,502	–	8	8
Rally of the French People				18,699	–	6	6
Independents of Lobi Country				10,550	–	3	3
African Democratic Rally				2,488	–	0	0
Social and Economic Development	597		10				10
Union for the Defence of the Interests of Upper Volta						7	7
Ethnic Party of Gourma						3	3
Other parties			0			0	0
Total			10			40	50
Total votes	929	–		207,112	–		
Registered voters/turnout	1,583	58.69		351,513	58.92		
Source: De Benoist
