= Gilbert Diendéré =

Burkinabé military officer (born c. 1960)

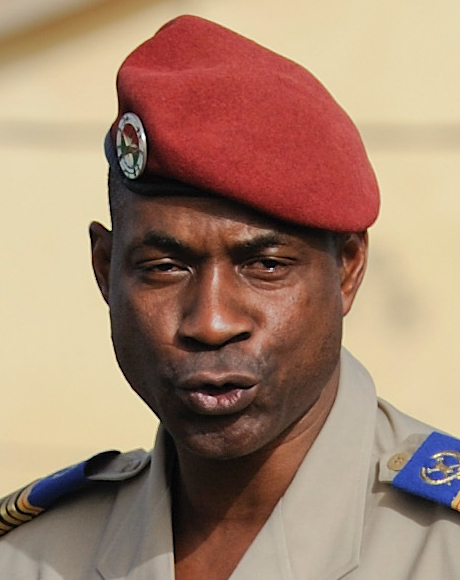
- Diendéré in 2010

Chairman of the National Council for Democracy of Burkina Faso (Note: The Chairman of the National Council for Democracy, was the de facto leader of the country.)
- In office 17 September 2015 – 23 September 2015
- Preceded by: Michel Kafando (Transitional President)
- Succeeded by: Michel Kafando (Transitional President)

Personal details
- Born: c. 1960 (age 65–66) Upper Volta (now Burkina Faso)
- Party: Independent
- Spouse: Fatou Diallo Diendéré

Military service
- Allegiance: Burkina Faso
- Branch/service: Army of Burkina Faso
- Rank: Brigadier general
- Unit: Regiment of Presidential Security

Gilbert Diendéré (French pronunciation: [ʒil.bɛʁ djɛn.de.ʁe]; born c. 1960) is a Burkinabé military officer and the Chairman of the National Council for Democracy, the military junta that briefly seized power in Burkina Faso in the September 2015 coup d'état. He was a long-time aide to President Blaise Compaoré, serving as commander of the Regiment of Presidential Security (RSP) during Compaoré's rule. He was appointed as chairman of the junta on 17 September 2015. Diendéré currently serves a prison sentence for his role in the 1987 killing of Thomas Sankara and the 1990 killing of Dabo Boukary.

== Career ==
Diendéré is suspected of having been directly involved in the October 1987 coup that resulted in the death of Thomas Sankara and installed Blaise Compaoré in power. Diendéré was commander of the national commando training center in Pô at the time of the coup, and all known assailants were identified by the sole survivor of the assault, Alouna Traoré, as having served directly under Diendéré.

During Compaoré's 27 years in power, Diendéré was considered one of his key allies in the military and served as chief of staff and head of the elite Regiment of Presidential Security (RSP) although he was also viewed as a shadowy figure. In late 2014, after the ouster of Compaoré, Diendéré was dismissed from his military leadership posts by the transitional authorities. Although he no longer headed the RSP, he remained closely linked to it during the events of 2015 in which the RSP found itself at odds with the transitional authorities, which wanted to disband it.

Members of the RSP launched a coup on 16 September 2015 and detained President Michel Kafando and Prime Minister Isaac Zida. On 17 September, Diendéré was appointed as Chairman of the National Council for Democracy, the new military junta. However, the junta failed to consolidate its authority across the country and faced pressure from regional leaders and eventually the regular army. At least 270 people were wounded and 17 killed as a result of the coup.

On 22 September 2015, the RSP agreed to a deal with the regular military requiring all RSP troops to return to their base. On 23 September, Interim President Kafando was restored to office. Diendéré admitted that the coup had been a "waste of time and resources... and human lives were lost". A meeting between Diendéré and several West African leaders occurred after a ceremony celebrating Kafando's return.

The government dissolved the RSP on 25 September 2015 and on 26 September froze the assets of Diendéré and others associated with the coup. After the army assaulted and captured the RSP's base, Diendéré fled to the Vatican embassy. The government assured the Vatican that Diendéré would not be killed, and he was turned over and taken into custody by the government on 1 October, escorted by former President Jean-Baptiste Ouédraogo. He was sentenced to 20 years in prison.

In addition to facing prosecution for the coup, Diendéré was also charged with involvement in Sankara's death, along with Compaoré and 12 other people. In November 2021, he appeared in court to testify in which he denied taking part in the arrests in question. Closing arguments were expected to take place the last week of January 2022, but after the coup on 23 January, the trial was suspended and Diendéré was freed from prison by mutineers, with supporters of junta claiming that the prosecution had been politically motivated.

In April 2022, the military tribunal of Ouagadougou again condemned Diendéré to a life sentence because of his role in the 1987 killing of Sankara. In September 2022, Diendéré was also condemned to serve a 20-year prison sentence, now for his complicity in the murder of syndicalist Dabo Boukary in 1990.

== Personal life ==
Diendéré is married to Fatou Diallo Diendéré, a politician who was sentenced to 30 years in prison for murder, assault, battery and harming state security.

== Notes ==
Political offices
Preceded by Michel Kafando as Transitional President of Burkina Faso	Chairman of the National Council for Democracy of Burkina Faso; 2015	Succeeded by Michel Kafando as Transitional President of Burkina Faso
