= Trade unions in Burkina Faso =

- National organization(s): CNTB, CSB, ONSL

Global Rights Index
- 4 Systematic violations of rights

International Labour Organization
- Burkina Faso is a member of the ILO

Convention ratification
- Freedom of Association: November 21, 1960
- Right to Organise: April 16, 1962

Trade unions in Burkina Faso have played important roles in the country's history, helping to oust governments perceived as corrupt and dictatorial.

For example, in 1966 the first of several military coups placed Lt. Col. Sangoule Lamizana at the head of a government of senior army officers. Lamizana remained in power throughout the 1970s, as President of military and then elected governments but with the support of unions and civil groups, Col. Saye Zerbo overthrew President Lamizana in the 1980 Upper Voltan coup d'état. However, Colonel Zerbo also encountered resistance from trade unions and was overthrown in 1982 by Jean-Baptiste Ouedraogo and the Council of Popular Salvation.
