= MLN =

MLN may refer to:

- Markov logic network
- Midlothian, historic county in Scotland, Chapman code
- Minuteman Library Network
- Modern Language Notes, a US journal of European literature
- Melilla Airport, Melilla, Spain, IATA code
- Milwaukee Brewers, National League baseball team
- Movement of National Liberation, Mexico, 1960s
- National Liberation Movement (Guatemala)
- National Liberation Movement (Panama)
- National Liberation Movement (Upper Volta)

== See also ==
- National Liberation Movement (disambiguation)
