= Ali Barraud =

Burkinabé politician (1918–2015)

- Born: Ali Barraud N'Goni; January 31, 1918
- Died: October 11, 2015 (aged 97)
- Occupations: Doctor, politician

Ali Barraud N'Goni (January 31, 1918 – October 11, 2015) was a Burkinabé politician who served as Minister of Public Health and Population for Upper Volta. He is the first medical officer in Bobo-Dioulasso, before he join the Rassemblement Démocratique Africain Liberation Movement ( RDA) in 1950. He resigned his position on January 22, 1974. He was involved in the 1948 founding of the Voltaic Democratic Party (PDV), which joined with the Social Party for the Emancipation of the African Masses (PSEMA) in 1956 to form the Unified Democratic Party (PDU) electoral alliance. From 1957 to 1959 he served as a member of the delegation of Upper Volta to the Grand Council of French Western Africa. In 1971 he was elected Vice-Chairman of the Executive Board of the World Health Organization.
