= Kaya Independent Party =

The Kaya Independent Party was a political party in Burkina Faso.

== History ==
The party was established by dissidents from the Voltaic Democratic Union-African Democratic Rally. It contested the 1970 parliamentary elections, putting forward seven candidates. The elections saw the party receive 0.74% of the vote and win 2 of the 57 seats in the National Assembly.
