= Joséphine Ki-Zerbo =

Burkinabé educator and activist (1936–2019)

Joséphine Ki-Zerbo (1936-2019) was an educator and activist from Burkina Faso. She was the wife of Joseph Ki-Zerbo.

In 1966 Joséphine Ki-Zerbo was principal of the Ecole Normal des Filled, She sent her students to join the protests against Maurice Yaméogo's government. She was a leader in the National Liberation Movement.

After Joseph Ki Zerbo was placed under house arrest in October 1983, the couple went into exile in Côte d'Ivoire. In July 1985 an Ouagadougou court sentenced the pair to two years imprisonment for tax evasion and illicit enrichment.
