= 1977 Upper Voltan constitutional referendum =

- 27 November 1977

Results
Choice	Votes	%
Yes	1,927,691	98.71%
No	25,278	1.29%
Valid votes	1,952,969	99.04%
Invalid or blank votes	19,018	0.96%
Total votes	1,971,987	100.00%
Registered voters/turnout	2,759,924	71.45%

A constitutional referendum was held in the Republic of Upper Volta on 27 November 1977. It followed the 1974 military coup, and would restore multi-party democracy. The new constitution retained the presidential system of government, and limited the number of political parties to three (the three with the highest number of votes in the forthcoming parliamentary elections would keep their status and other parties disbanded). It was approved by 98.70% of voters with a 71.6% turnout.

== Results ==
Choice	Votes	%
For	1,927,691	98.70
Against	25,278	1.30
Invalid/blank votes	19,108	–
Total	1,972,077	100
Registered voters/turnout	2,759,924	71.45
Source: African Elections Database
