= Popular Action Grouping =

Political party in Upper Volta

Popular Action Grouping (French: Groupement d'Action Populaire, abbreviated GAP), was an traditionalist and Islamic political party in Upper Volta, formed in 1966 as a splinter group of the Voltan Democratic Union (UDV). The leaders of the party were Nouhoun Sigué Massa (party chairman) and Saïdou Ouédraogo (party general secretary). The party was banned in 1974. GAP did not win any seats in the 1978 election.
