= FPV =

FPV may refer to:

== Politics ==
- Front for Victory (Spanish: Frente para la Victoria), a political party and alliance in Argentina
- Voltaic Progressive Front (French: Front Progressiste Voltaïque), a political party in Upper Volta
- Fishery Protection Vessel, of the Scottish Fisheries Protection Agency

== Sports ==
- Peruvian Volleyball Federation (Spanish: Federación Peruana de Voleibol)
- Portuguese Volleyball Federation (Portuguese: Federação Portuguesa de Voleibol)
- Puerto Rican Volleyball Federation (Spanish: Federación Puertoriqueña de Voleibol)
- Valencian Pilota Federation (Catalan: Federació de Pilota Valenciana)
- FK Pobeda Valandovo, a football club from Valandovo, Republic of Macedonia
- FK Prelegentai Vilnius, a Lithuanian football team

== Other ==
- Feline panleukopenia virus
- First-person view (radio control), a method of piloting radio-controlled devices using FPV camera and goggles.
- FPV loitering munition, radio-controlled drones with explosives attached to it.
- Ford Performance Vehicles, an Australian vehicle manufacturer
- Fosamprenavir, a medication for HIV/AIDS
