= 1980 Upper Voltan coup d'état =

1980 military coup in present-day Burkina Faso

Date	25 November 1980
Location	Upper Volta
Result	Coup successful, civil government overthrown and military rule reinstated

Belligerents
(Republic of Upper Volta) Government: African Democratic Rally	(Republic of Upper Volta) Military Committee of Recovery for National Progress: Trade unions

Commanders and leaders
Sangoulé Lamizana; Joseph Conombo	Saye Zerbo

The 1980 Upper Voltan coup d'état took place on 25 November 1980 in the Republic of Upper Volta (today Burkina Faso). Following a long period of drought, famine, popular unrest and labour strikes, Colonel Saye Zerbo overthrew President Sangoulé Lamizana, another military leader. Zerbo himself would be overthrown only two years later.

== Background ==
Upper Volta had gained independence from France in 1960, after which President Maurice Yaméogo set about creating a single-party dictatorship ruled by his own Voltaic Democratic Union. Following several rigged elections and a new austerity budget being instituted, the powerful trade unions rose up against the President, which caused the 1966 Upper Voltan coup d'état, in which Lieutenant Colonel Sangoulé Lamizana took power. This marked the beginning of a long era of military rule in Upper Volta and later Burkina Faso.

Lamizana would go on to rule the country as a military dictator until the Upper Voltan presidential election in 1977, when he was elected as the leader of a civilian regime. During the 1970s, the Lamizana government faced many problems, among them continued opposition from the trade unions, the rise of new political opposition groups, a strong Sahel drought, increasing desertification, and so on. The need for foreign aid reached record levels, in 1979 making up a full 70% of the government budget.

In February 1979 the major trade unions launched a new anti-Lamizana campaign. In May, two prominent labour leaders were arrested for inciting tenge – week-long protest strikes soon led to their release. Two months later, Lamizana denounced the unionist demands, calling for national unity. By December, the president finally acknowledges the country's dependence on Western aid for survival. On 7 January 1980, a general strike began. It proved brief, but more trouble lay ahead for Lamizana by the end of the year.

== Coup ==
On 1 October, school teachers started striking, which transformed into a full general strike by early November, putting heavy pressure on the government. On 12 November, President Lamizana survived a motion of no confidence, with a 33–24 vote margin. While the teachers agreed on 22 November to go back to work, the unrest had yet to culminate.

On 25 November, Colonel Saye Zerbo led a military coup d'état, overthrowing President Lamizana. The coup proved both bloodless and successful. The riot police, deployed against the striking workers, attempted a counter-coup in support of Lamizana, but failed to reinstate him. Zerbo – a military veteran, former Minister of Foreign Affairs 1974–1976, commander of the army regiment in the capital Ouagadougou, and head of military intelligence – suspended the constitution, and established the Military Committee of Recovery for National Progress (French: Comité Militaire de Redressement pour le Progrès National, CMPRN), a 31-member junta. Several members of the junta were young and radical, among them future presidents Thomas Sankara and Blaise Compaoré. Among the parts of society that supported the coup were the Mossi people and the Upper Voltan Catholics, two groups sidelined by Lamizana, although Zerbo like his predecessor was a Bissa Muslim.

== Aftermath ==
The new President Zerbo initially had the support of the trade unions, as Lamizana once had after his 1966 coup, winning the support of the striking teachers by giving in to most of their demands. The traditional chieftains also supported Zerbo. On 16 December, he established a 16-member cabinet. This contention didn't last long – the government faced large protests already in May, after Zerbo announced the imposition of mandatory military service and warned the unions to watch their tone towards the regime. Later, after continued unrest, he would ban labour strikes a few weeks ahead of the coup's one-year anniversary.

After two years of similar actions, Zerbo was overthrown by the military in yet another coup in 1982, making Major Dr. Jean-Baptiste Ouédraogo President. Military rule has continued in the country since then, with numerous coups and coup attempts.

== See also ==
- History of Burkina Faso
