= Voltaic Progressive Front =

The Voltaic Progressive Front (French: Front Progressiste Voltaïque, FPV) was a political party in Upper Volta.

== History ==
The party was established in 1977 as the Voltaic Progressive Union (Union Progressiste Voltaïque, UPV) by dissidents from several parties. The UPV received 16% of the vote in the April 1978 parliamentary elections, winning nine seats. It nominated Joseph Ki-Zerbo as its candidate in the presidential elections in May. Ki-Zerbo finished last in the four-man field with 16% of the vote.

In 1979 the party was renamed the Voltaic Progressive Front. It was banned in November 1980.
