= Joseph Ouédraogo =

Burkinabé politician (1919–1988)

Joseph Ouédraogo (11 January 1919 – 1988) was a Burkinabé trade unionist and politician, active during the last years of the French Upper Volta and subsequently in the Republic of Upper Volta.

== Biography ==
Joseph Ouédraogo was born on 11 January 1919 in Saaba, French West Africa. From 1929 to 1933 he received his primary education at the Catholic Mission School of Ouagadougou and before undertaking Secondary studies at the Pabré Undergraduate Seminary from 1933 to 1939.

Ouédraogo became a Catholic labor activist and was a member of the Voltaic Union after World War II. In 1954, he was elected Secretary-General of the Catholic Union nationale locale des syndicats chrétiens de Haute Volta, out of which grew the Confédération africaine des travailleurs chrétiens in 1956, which was renamed the Confédération africaine des travailleurs croyants in 1957 to accommodate non-Catholic workers. He was a member of the Territorial Assembly of Upper Volta from 1952 to 1959, and President of the Assembly in 1952–53. In 1956 he joined the Unified Democratic Party (PDU) as a supporter of Ouëzzin Coulibaly. Ouédraogo was selected to be a member of the Senate of the French Community. He was mayor of Ouagadougou from 1956 to 1959. He was Minister of Finance, 1957–58 and Minister of the Interior, 1958–59. In August 1959 Maurice Yaméogo forced Ouédraogo out of office as mayor of Ouagadougou, and after Yaméogo became President in 1960 Ouédraogo was interned for a while. Ouédraogo was a leader of the syndicalist general strike and 1966 military coup against Yaméogo.

In 1970 Ouédraogo became Secretary-General of the Union démocratique voltaïque (UDV), and he was elected to the new National Assembly in the December 1970 elections. In the early 1970s Ouédraogo and Gérard Ouédraogo (unrelated) were rival leaders of the Union démocratique voltaïque (UDV): an agreement that Gérard would serve as prime minister and Joseph as president of the National Assembly broke down in 1974, and in February 1974 the army stepped in to suspend the 1970 constitution and restore military rule.

Joseph Ouédraogo gained 16.6% in the first round of the 1978 presidential election, and did not continue to the second round. He died in 1988.
