= 1970 Upper Voltan constitutional referendum =

- 14 June 1970

Results
Choice	Votes	%
Yes	1,757,004	98.56%
No	25,757	1.44%
Valid votes	1,782,761	98.10%
Invalid or blank votes	34,580	1.90%
Total votes	1,817,341	100.00%
Registered voters/turnout	2,351,258	77.29%

A constitutional referendum was held in the Republic of Upper Volta on 14 June 1970. It followed the 1966 military coup, and would restore multi-party democracy. However, the new constitution made the country a presidential republic, with the President able to dissolve the National Assembly and rule by decree. It also allowed coup leader Sangoulé Lamizana to remain President for a further four years. It was approved by 98.56% of voters with a 77.3% turnout.

== Results ==
Choice	Votes	%
For	1,757,004	98.56
Against	25,757	1.44
Invalid/blank votes	34,580	–
Total	1,817,341	100
Registered voters/turnout	2,351,258	77.3
Source: Sternberger et al.
