= Jacqueline Ki-Zerbo =

Malian women's rights and pro-democracy activist

- Born: Jacqueline Coulibaly; September 23, 1933; Segou, Mali
- Died: December 15, 2015 (aged 82); Ouagadougou, Burkina Faso
- Resting place: Toma, Burkina Faso, Nayala Province
- Education: Sorbonne; École Normale de Rifisque
- Organization: UNIFEM
- Spouse: Joseph Ki-Zerbo
- Children: three sons, two daughters
- Parents: Lazarre Coulibaly (father); Gertrude Traore (mother)

Jacqueline Ki-Zerbo née Coulibaly (23 September 1933 – 15 December 2015) was a Malian women's rights activist, pro-democracy activist and activist in the endogenous development of Africa. She was involved in the popular uprising of January 3, 1966 in which she led a group of women and young girls who marched on the presidency with inscription such as “water, bread and democracy for the people." She was awarded the Paul G. Hoffmann Award for outstanding work in national and international development in 1984.

== Background ==
Ki-Zerbo was born in Ouagadougou, Burkina Faso to Lazarre Coulibaly and Gertrude Traore. Ki-Zerbo began her post-secondary studies at Collége des Jeunes Filles in Bamako and completed her baccalaureate at École Normale de Rifisque in Dakar, Senegal. Ki-Zerbo received her license in English at the Sorbonne in Paris in 1956. She married Joseph Ki-Zerbo in 1956. They had three sons and two daughters together.

Ki-Zerbo was employed as an English teacher at the Lycée Philippe Zinda Kaboré in Ouagadougou in 1961 and became the director of the Normal Course for Young Girls (since renamed Nelson Mandela High School) in Ouagadougou, until 1974, when she served the trade union press Voices of the Teachers. In the 1960s, she joined Guinea to support Ahmed Sékou Touré. Ki-Zerbo joined the Teacher's Training School for Girls in Burkina Faso as the first female African Director. While there, she pushed for legislation that would allow pregnant girls to continue their studies at school.

Ki-Zerbo was active in the international community. She was the co-ordinator of the Permanent Interstate Committee for drought control in the Sahel's Sahel Improved Housing Programme from 1981 to 1983, during which time she was instrumental in spreading knowledge about fuel-saving cookstoves. Ki-Zerbo was the first Director of UNIFEM in West and Central Africa, and represented West and Central Africa in the UNIFEM Development Fund for Women in 1987. She helped lead the first effort to mainstream gender in development at the Chad UNDP Round table. Recognizing that women headed 80% of the Sahel's agricultural workforce, she encouraged national governments and international donors to provide women in the Sahel region with the tools to enter and succeed in business and serve as liaisons between communities and policy-makers.

Ki-Zerbo died on December 15, 2015, in Ouagadougou. She was buried in Toma in the province of Nayala.

== Honours ==
- 1984: Paul G. Hoffmann Prize for outstanding work in national and international development
- 1994: Nominated as one of The American Biographical Institute's Most Admired Men and Women.
- 2008: Decorated as a knight of the National Order of Merit in Arts, Letters and Communication with the “oral and written literature” staple as part of the Ouagadougou International Book Fair (FILO)
