= 1948 Upper Voltan Territorial Assembly election =

Territorial Assembly elections were held in French Upper Volta on 30 May 1948, with a second round on 20 June. They were the first elections to the new Territorial Assembly, which had been created following the separation of Upper Volta from Ivory Coast the previous year.

== Electoral system ==
The Territorial Assembly had 50 seats, with 10 elected by the First College (French citizens) and 40 by the Second College (non-French citizens). The 1948 elections elected an additional 24 seats; six to the first college and 16 to the second.

== Campaign ==
Governor Albert Mouragues was accused of favouring the Voltaic Union over the African Democratic Rally-affiliated Entente Voltaïque (EV), with some commandants "using strong-arm methods" against the EV candidates, whilst a significant number of EV supporters were imprisoned.

== Results ==
Party	First round			Second round			Total seats
Party	Votes	%	Seats	Votes	%	Seats	Total seats
First College
Rally of the French People			3				3
Union List			3				3
Total			6				6
Total votes	784	–					
Registered voters/turnout	1,382	56.73					
Second College
Voltaic Union			7			3	10
African Democratic Rally			2			2	4
Community of Yatenga			1			0	1
AC			1			0	1
Total			11			5	16
Total votes	78,895	–					
Registered voters/turnout	137,293	57.46					
Source: De Benoist
