= Da, Burkina Faso =

Da
- Location within Burkina Faso
- Coordinates: 12°2′N 3°9′W
- Country: Burkina Faso
- Region: Boucle du Mouhoun Region
- Province: Balé Province
- Department: Oury Department

Population (2019)
  - Total: 2,821
- Time zone: UTC+0 (GMT)

Da is a town in the Oury Department of Balé Province in southern Burkina Faso.

Population
Year	Pop.	±%
1985	1,356	—
2006	1,912	+41.0%
2019	2,821	+47.5%
