= 1965 Yugoslavian parliamentary election =

Partial parliamentary elections were held in Yugoslavia on 4 April 1965 to elect 58 of the 120 seats in the Federal Council.

== Results ==
Party	Votes	%	Seats
Socialist Alliance of Working People	5,272,272	100.00	58
Total	5,272,272	100.00	58
Valid votes	5,272,272	96.90	
Invalid/blank votes	168,512	3.10	
Total votes	5,440,784	100.00	
Registered voters/turnout	5,920,371	91.90	
Source: Sternberger et al
