= National Union for the Defence of Democracy =

National Union for the Defence of Democracy (in French: Union Nationale pour la Défense de la Démocratie) was a political party in Upper Volta. The UNDD is led by Hermann Yaméogo, the son of former president Maurice Yaméogo.

In the 1978 presidential elections the UNDD launched Macaire Ouédraogo as its candidate. Ouédraogo got 254,465 votes in the first round (25.22%) and 552,956 votes (43.8%) in the second. In the National Assembly held the same year, the UNDD came in second winning 13 seats. In 2005 the party, refounded, took part in the presidential election of 13 November, where its candidate Hermann Yaméogo won 0.76% of the popular vote.
