= 1965 Dallas mayoral election =

- April 6, 1965
Candidate	J. Erik Jonsson	Elizabeth Blessing
Party	Nonpartisan	Nonpartisan
Popular vote	59,438	21,353
Percentage	73.57%	26.43%
Mayor before election
J. Erik Jonsson
Elected mayor
J. Erik Jonsson

The 1965 Dallas mayoral election was held on April 6, 1965. J. Erik Jonsson was elected mayor in a special election in 1964 following the vacancy of Earle Cabell due to his election to the U.S. House of Representatives. J. Erik Jonsson would run for election in 1965 and was elected mayor with 73.6% of the vote.

== Results ==
1965 Dallas mayoral election
Party	Candidate	Votes	%
Nonpartisan	J. Erik Jonsson	59,438	73.57%
Nonpartisan	Elizabeth Blessing	21,353	26.43%
