= 1965 United States gubernatorial elections =

← 1964	November 2, 1965	1966 →

2 governorships
	Majority party	Minority party
Party	Democratic	Republican
Seats before	33	17
Seats after	33	17
Seat change	Steady	Steady
Popular vote	1,576,094	1,128,203
Percentage	56.44%	40.40%
Seats up	2	0
Seats won	2	0
- Democratic hold

United States gubernatorial elections were held in November 1965, in two states.

== New Jersey ==
After his re-election win, Richard J. Hughes tried to introduce an income tax, but that bill died. The tax would come into play after the state Supreme Court handed down a decision concerning property taxes for schools in 1973. Hughes became Chief Justice in 1974, and after much battling with then-Gov. Brendan Byrne and the New Jersey Legislature concerning taxes for public education, the income tax finally made it to New Jersey.

== Virginia ==
The 1965 Virginia Governor's Race was colorful in that not only a new governor emerged, (Mills E. Godwin, Jr.), who would go on to serve the term as a Democrat and later serve another term as a Republican in the 1970s, but that another opponent, A. Linwood Holton, Jr., would go on to serve a term as Virginia's first Republican Governor since Reconstruction. Not to mention that George Lincoln Rockwell, the 'American Hitler', ran in this race.

== Results ==
State	Incumbent	Party	Status	Opposing candidates
New Jersey	Richard J. Hughes	Democratic	Re-elected, 57.39%	Wayne Dumont (Republican) 41.08% Robert Lee Schlachter (Conservative) 0.93% Christopher C. Vespucci (Veterans Choice) 0.24% Julius Levin (Socialist Labor) 0.21% Ruth F. Shiminsky (Socialist Workers) 0.14%
Virginia	Albertis Harrison	Democratic	Term-limited, Democratic victory	Mills Godwin (Democratic) 47.89% Linwood Holton (Republican) 37.71% William J. Story Jr. (Virginia Conservative) 13.38% George Lincoln Rockwell (Independent) 1.02%
