= 1965 Upper Voltan parliamentary election =

Parliamentary elections were held in the Republic of Upper Volta on 7 November 1965. The country had been a one-party state since 1960, with the Voltaic Democratic Union–African Democratic Rally as the sole legal party. It therefore won all 75 seats in the National Assembly. Voter turnout was 97.4%.

== Results ==
Party	Votes	%	Seats	+/–
Voltaic Democratic Union–African Democratic Rally	2,131,950	100.00	75	+13
Total	2,131,950	100.00	75	0
Valid votes	2,131,950	99.98		
Invalid/blank votes	468	0.02		
Total votes	2,132,418	100.00		
Registered voters/turnout	2,188,241	97.45		
Source: Sternberger et al.
