= Gabriel Somé Yorian =

Gabriel Somé Yorian (1935-1989) was the architect of a military coup against Colonel Saye Zerbo, as the then head of the army of Burkina Faso. He did not himself assume power, but allowed Major Jean-Baptiste Ouédraogo to take over.

Yorian was killed later on in another coup launched by Captain Thomas Sankara.
