= National Liberation Movement (Upper Volta) =

The National Liberation Movement (French: Mouvement de Libération Nationale, MLN) was a left-wing political party in Burkina Faso.

== History ==
The party was originally established by Joseph Ki-Zerbo in Dakar in Senegal in August 1958. Ki-Zerbo founded the party in order to campaign for a "no" vote in the constitutional referendum in September. After 99% of voters voted for the new constitution, Ki Zerbo moved to Guinea, the only country to oppose the constitution and subsequently become independent.

In 1970 Ki-Zerbo re-established the party to run in the parliamentary elections that year. It received 11% of the vote and won 6 of the 57 seats in the National Assembly.

The party was banned in 1974.
