= Jean-Baptiste Ouédraogo =

Burkinabé politician (born 1942)

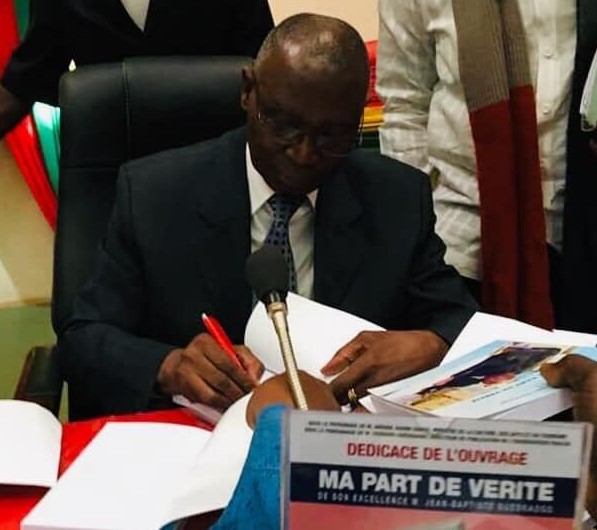
- Ouédraogo at a book signing in 2020

President of Upper Volta
- In office 8 November 1982 – 4 August 1983
- Prime Minister: Thomas Sankara
- Preceded by: Saye Zerbo
- Succeeded by: Thomas Sankara

Minister of National Defence and Veterans Affairs of Upper Volta
- In office 26 November 1982 – 23 August 1983
- Preceded by: Saye Zerbo
- Succeeded by: Jean-Baptiste Boukary Lingani

Personal details
- Born: 30 June 1942 (age 84) Kaya, French West Africa (now Burkina Faso)
- Spouse: Bernadette Ouédraogo
- Children: 3
- Education: University of Abidjan; University of Strasbourg

Military service
- Allegiance: Republic of Upper Volta
- Years of service: 1972–1983
- Rank: Médicin-commandant (major)

Jean-Baptiste Philippe Ouédraogo (French pronunciation: [ʒɑ̃ batist filip wedʁaɔɡo]; born 30 June 1942), also referred to by his initials JBO, is a Burkinabé physician and retired military officer who served as President of Upper Volta (now Burkina Faso) from 8 November 1982 to 4 August 1983. He has since mediated a few national political disputes and operates a clinic in Somgandé.

Ouédraogo received his early education in Upper Volta before joining the Upper Voltan Army and studying medicine abroad. After working in healthcare, he was appointed chief medical officer of the Ouagadougou military camp. He participated in the November 1982 coup d'état and shortly thereafter assumed the presidency. More ideologically moderate than most of his comrades, Ouédraogo did not command much popular support and governed the country amid an unstable political climate. He was for private ownership of businesses. A protracted dispute with Prime Minister Thomas Sankara resulted in his removal from power in a coup in August 1983 and imprisonment. He was released in 1985 and resumed medical work. He opened a clinic in Somgandé in 1992, which he still operates. In the 2010s, he acted as a mediator between opposing political factions.

== Early life and education ==
Jean-Baptiste Ouédraogo was born on 30 June 1942 in Kaya, French West Africa. He started his education at the École Primaire Catholique de Bam, (Note: Catholic Primary School of Bam) later attending the minor seminary of Pabré before completing his secondary education at the Lycée de Philippe-Zinda-Kaboré de Ouagadougou. (Note: Philippe-Zinda-Kaboré Secondary School of Ouagadougou) He studied medicine at the University of Abidjan and the School of Naval Medicine in Bordeaux, graduating from the latter in 1974. He then took courses at the University of Strasbourg, with a focus in paediatrics. Ouédraogo finished his studies with a doctor of medicine, and degrees in sports medicine and in paediatrics and child welfare.

Ouédraogo became the first head of the paediatrics department at the Centre hospitalier universitaire Yalgado-Ouédraogo (Note: Yalgado-Ouédraogo University Hospital Center) in Ouagadougou, serving there from 1976 until 1977. Afterwards he interned at a hospital in Mulhouse until 1981. He married a school teacher, Bernadette, and had three children with her, all of whom became physicians.

== Military career and presidency ==
=== Early military career ===
"The new master of Ouagadougou is small in size, lean. He stands in his uniform; full of good-nature, a little juvenile. A quiet father, without any political past, becomes the number one of the Voltaic state. He has just started his political career...It is in spite of himself that Jean-Baptiste Ouédraogo is called by soldiers to supreme responsibilities, and the halo of modesty adds even more to his brilliance."

— Marie-Louise Nignan, Minister of Justice (translated from French)

Ouédraogo was commissioned as a second lieutenant and medic into the Upper Voltan Army in October 1972. In October 1979 he was promoted to médicin-commandant (equivalent to major). Three years later he was appointed chief medical officer of the new Ouagadougou military base, Camp Militaire de Gounghin. (Note: According to Harsch, Ouédraogo was head of the army's medical service.)

=== 1982 coup and assumption of presidency ===
On 7 November 1982 Ouédraogo participated in a military coup which ousted President of Upper Volta Saye Zerbo. He and his fellow military officers then formed the Conseil de Salut du Peuple (Note: Council of the Salvation of the People) (CSP). Two days later the council elected him President as a compromise choice between the leftist radicals and conservatives. He was the first Mossi head of state since Maurice Yaméogo. According to Ouédraogo, Captain Thomas Sankara was supposed to take power but withdrew at the last minute, leading other officers to choose him to assume the presidency due to his senior rank though, in his words, "against my will". Unlike Sankara, he lacked political experience and popular support, and was quickly regarded by the leftist members of the CSP as conservative and sympathetic to policies of France. Ouédraogo thought of his opponents as "hard-core Marxists" and maintained that he was a "liberal and sincere democrat". Nevertheless, the media viewed Ouédraogo and Sankara as united in goals and dubbed them "Siamese twins". Shortly after taking power, Ouédraogo told the foreign diplomatic corps in Upper Volta that the new government would uphold a non-aligned foreign policy, respect its international agreements, and defend its territory with "intransigence".

On 21 November 1982, Ouédraogo declared that the CSP would restore a constitutional, civilian regime in two years time. Five days later the CSP installed a formal government. Ouédraogo was the only soldier in the cabinet and, in addition to his role as President, was made Minister of National Defence and Veterans Affairs. On the whole the CSP exercised true control of the government while Ouédraogo served as little more than a figurehead. The freedoms of labour unions and the press, having been restricted under Zerbo's reign, were restored by the new administration. Ouédraogo attended Mogho Naba Kougri's funeral in December and placed a wreath at the Mossi leader's coffin. (Note: One observer stated, "Apparently Ouedraogo [sic] had concluded that to be successful he would have to work with and to some extent, through the power structures that were still important to the people.") The CSP elected Sankara as Prime Minister in January 1983, in effect instituting a power counterbalance to Ouédraogo.

On 28 February 1983, a plot by several army officers to massacre the CSP in assembly and restore Zerbo's regime was foiled when they delayed and were arrested by other officials. One of the leading putschists was a commandant who had been considered for the presidency following the 1982 coup. When questioned about the incident, Ouédraogo told the press, "Since our regime makes many people uneasy, it is quite normal that people should plan this sort of reaction." He publicly declared his determination to "guarantee order and security" and asserted that "the army will not allow itself to be dissuaded by tribal fights and ideologies". He also stated that corruption and fraud in the business community had, in part, facilitated the state of "total anarchy" over which the government presided, and announced that the national administration would be restructured to mitigate the disorder.

"Upper Volta is not under the thumb of any foreign country or ideology. Its membership of the Non-Aligned Movement affirms its total determination to remain independent, to stand above the major hegemonic rivalries which pose such a threat to world peace."

— Statement delivered by Ouédraogo to the press in Lomé, Togo

Meanwhile, as Sankara toured various communist and socialist countries, rumors circulated among the Voltaic population that the CSP would assume a radical leftist approach to governing and expropriate small businesses. In an attempt to alleviate concerns, Ouédraogo told members of the National Council of Voltaic Employers that "private initiative will be maintained...you are the primary motor of the country's economic activity". Sankara concluded his tour with a visit to Libya. A Libyan transport aircraft landed at Ouagadougou Airport shortly after his return, generating rumours of a plot to install a pro-Libya regime in Upper Volta. Ouédraogo assured the populace that it was "a routine visit, a kind of courtesy call and I think that we must not try to see anything beyond that," and stated that "there should be no talk of setting up a Voltaic Jamahiriya". On 26 March Ouédraogo and Sankara held a meeting in the capital, where differences in their beliefs began to emerge. That day the CSP organised a large rally in the city where a moderate speech by Ouédraogo was much less enthusiastically received than Sankara's radical remarks. From 20 to 26 April Ouédraogo and several of his ministers visited Lomé, Togo; Accra, Ghana; and Niamey, Niger. (Note: According to Rupley, Bangali, and Diamitani, Ouédraogo visited Benin instead of Togo.) President Félix Houphouët-Boigny refused to meet him in the Ivory Coast, advising that he should focus on stemming Libyan influence within his own country.

=== Dispute with Sankara and overthrow ===
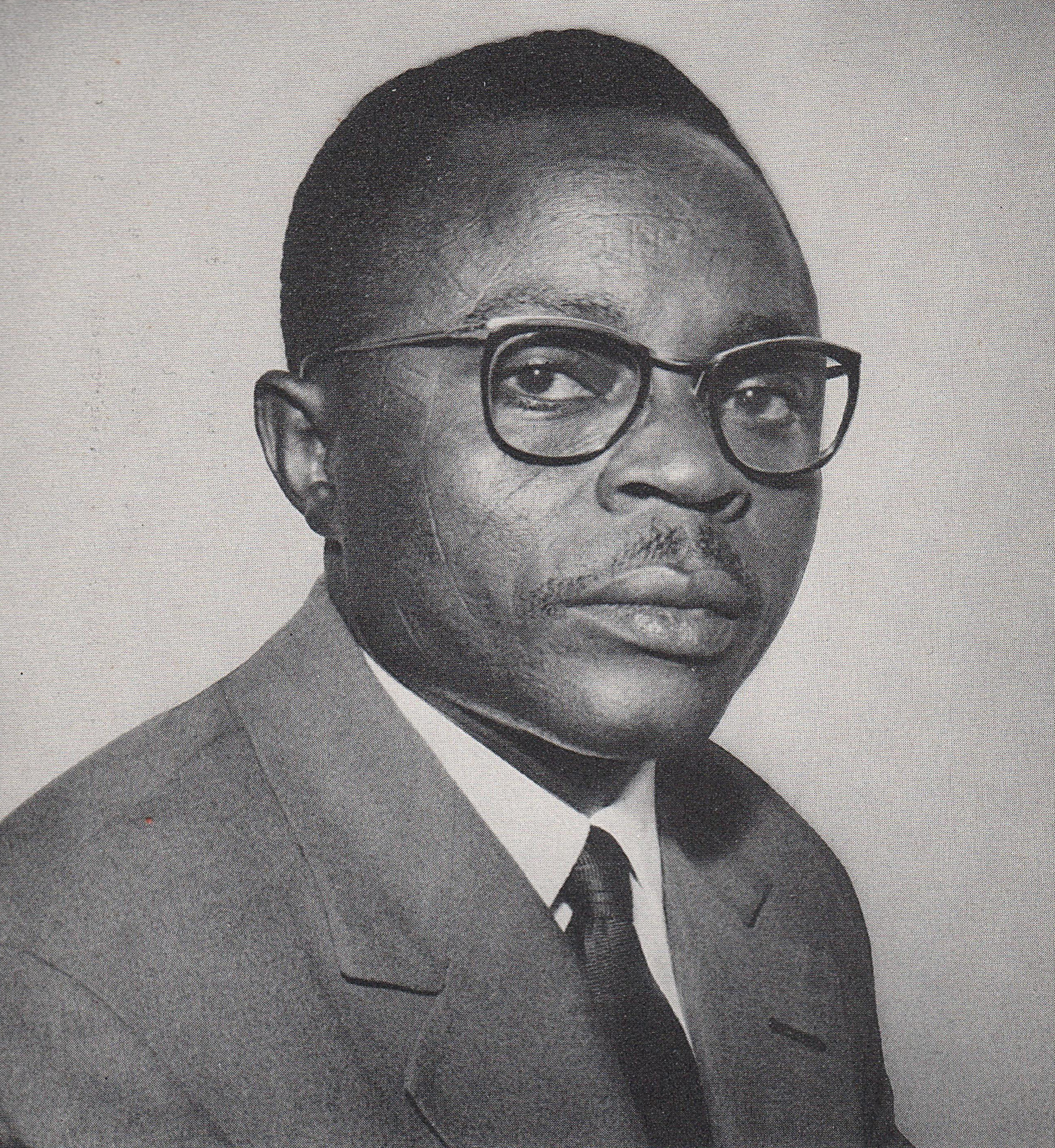
Ouédraogo's rehabilitation of former Upper Voltan President Maurice Yaméogo (pictured) generated backlash from some politicians.

As his tenure progressed, Ouédraogo found himself unable to reconcile the conservative and radical factions of the CSP, whose disagreements were leading to a political stalemate. On 14 May 1983 the CSP convened in the town of Bobo-Dioulasso. A crowd gathered to hear a message from the council. Sankara spoke until dusk, and the crowd mostly dispersed, its members eager to break their Ramadan fasts. Ouédraogo was in turn left without an audience for his speech, as Sankara seemingly intended in an effort to humiliate him. The following day he met with Guy Penne, a top African affairs adviser of President of France François Mitterrand. On 16 May he purged his government of pro-Libyan and anti-French elements, disbanded the CSP, and had Sankara and several other important officials arrested. (Note: According to Sankara, the two met earlier that day to discuss their differences, but were unable to reach an understanding and thus "separated themselves from being Siamese twins".) Explaining the reasons for the radicals' removal, he said, "It is a problem of ideology...We were following step by step the program of the [Ligue patriotique pour le développement], and that program was to lead us to a communist society." (Note: The motives for Ouédraogo's decision are not agreed upon. Some observers attribute the coup to growing pressure from France, while others state that Ouédraogo and the conservatives in the military acted over dissatisfaction with Sankara's relationship with Libya. According to one account, Colonel Gabriel Somé Yorian, the conservative Chief of Staff of the Army, had schemed with Penne to remove Sankara. On the morning of 16 May soldiers surrounded Sankara's and Ouédraogo's residences. Somé told Ouédraogo he could dismiss Sankara or be removed from office, and the President assented.) He met again with Penne, who promised his government significant financial aid from France. One officer, Blaise Compaoré, evaded capture and escaped to Sankara's former garrison at Pô where he began to organise resistance. In the following days large demonstrations occurred in Ouagadougou in support of Sankara. Ouédraogo's political position was weak; his left-wing opponents were well organised while he did not have reliable connections with the conservative factions he supposedly represented and could only really count on the support of a handful of his former classmates from the Pabré minor seminary. Realising that the use of force was of little recourse, he sought to resolve the situation by appeasing his adversaries.

On 27 May 1983 Ouédraogo delivered a speech, promising a quick return to civilian rule and the liberation of political prisoners. He also announced the drafting of a new constitution within six months, to be followed by an election in which he would not participate. He also felt that the increased politicisation of the army was dangerous and compounded the threat of a civil war, so he warned that any soldiers found to be involving themselves in politics would be reprimanded. Stating that the older generation of politicians had been discredited and should retire, he announced that "patriots" and "new men with a sense of responsibility and national realities" should assume leadership of the country. Ouédraogo finished by expressing his hope that the Upper Voltan youth could avoid the trappings of partisan politics. Several days later he released Sankara, who was confined under guard to house arrest. While the situation deteriorated, Ouédraogo accelerated the execution of his goals, liberating many political prisoners held under Zerbo's regime. However, his extension of political rehabilitation to Yaméogo antagonised many politicians whom Yaméogo had repressed. Sankara was soon rearrested but then released following mounting pressure from Compaoré's troops. On 4 June Ouédraogo removed a number of pro-Sankara ministers from his government.

Tensions continued to increase until 4 August 1983 when Compaoré launched a coup. (Note: According to some accounts, Compaoré's forces were moved to act when they received reports that Colonel Gabriel Somé Yorian, a conservative member of the CSP, was planning on deposing Ouédraogo, seizing power, and killing Sankara and his allies.) Paratroopers mobilised in Pô to march on Ouagadougou. Meanwhile, Ouédraogo consulted his chief of staff, who advised him to negotiate an end to his political conflict with Sankara. Ouédraogo received Sankara at 19:00 at his residence and offered to resign "to facilitate the establishment of a transitional government that would be unanimous". Sankara agreed to the proposal but asked for a few hours' delay so he could discuss it with Compaoré. He departed at 20:30 but was unable to inform Compaoré or the other putschists of the truce. At around the same time the paratroopers infiltrated the capital and began to seize strategic locations throughout. At Ouédraogo's residence, men of the Presidential Guard exchanged heavy fire with the putschists before surrendering. Compaoré arrived on the scene at around 22:00, followed by Sankara an hour later. The latter informed Ouédraogo of the "revolution" and offered to exile him and his family. Ouédraogo replied that he would rather remain in the country under the new regime. He was then taken to the Presidential Palace to spend the night. The following evening he was imprisoned at the military camp in Pô. Sankara became the new President of Upper Volta. Ouédraogo was officially removed from his post as Minister of National Defence on 23 August and succeeded by Jean-Baptiste Boukary Lingani. He was discharged from the army two days later. Sankara changed the name of Upper Volta to Burkina Faso in 1984, and three years later he was killed in a coup and replaced by Compaoré.

== Later life ==
Ouédraogo was granted clemency on 4 August 1985 and returned to medical work, taking a job at the Hôpital Yalgado-Ouédraogo. Nevertheless, the Sankara regime monitored his activities and restricted him from reentry into the army. In 1992 he successfully secured a loan of 250 million West African CFA francs from a French bank and founded a clinic, the Notre-Dame de la Paix, (Note: Our Lady of Peace) in the Somgandé district, south of Ouagadougou. In 2007 he served between 400 and 500 patients a month. In 2005 Ouédraogo was awarded a gold medal by the Geneva-based Foundation for Excellence in Business Practice. He also won the first prize in the Ministry of the Environment's competition for the best living environment health facilities in the Centre Region. That December a street in the Nongr-Massom district of Ouagadougou was named after him. In 2016 he was the president of the Fédération des Associations Professionnelles de la Santé Privée. (Note: Federation of Private Health Professional Associations) As of 2021 Ouédraogo still worked at his medical clinic.

=== Involvement in politics ===
"I have been mediator a few times. And every time I have been, I have always felt it was a duty and a moral obligation not to shun a patriotic call...Whenever my contribution can help to solve a problem, I am happy to do so."

— Ouédraogo's thoughts on serving as a political mediator (translated from French)

Upon his return to medical work in 1985 Ouédraogo declared that he would not take an active role in politics and from then on he generally showed little interest in involving himself in public affairs. In 1999 he was made a member of the Conseil du Sages, (Note: Council of Wise Men) though by 2014 he had left the consultative body. In November 2012 he delivered a speech on behalf of himself and Saye Zerbo, expressing concern about how corrupt Burkina Faso's administration had become over the preceding years and accusing the country's leaders of inaction on the matter.

In early 2014 Ouédraogo acted as a mediator between President Compaoré and opposition groups as tensions between the two dramatically rose. However, the arbitration failed in April, and Compaoré later resigned and fled the country. In September 2015 members of the military launched a coup. Ouédraogo was asked to mediate, and he attempted to delay the putschists and secure the release of hostages. As the army turned against the coup he made multiple appeals to the plot's leader, Gilbert Diendéré, to surrender. After seeking refuge in the Vatican embassy, Diendéré was handed over to Burkinabé transitional government authorities and Ouédraogo escorted him into custody at the gendarmerie base in the capital. In April 2017 Ouédraogo and several other national figures met with leaders of the Coalition for Democracy and National Reconciliation, an opposition coalition formed out of Compaoré's supporters, to discuss political reconciliation. In 2020 he released a memoir titled Ma part de vérité.
