= 1965 Upper Voltan presidential election =

First presidential election in Upper Volta

Presidential elections were held for the first time in the Republic of Upper Volta on 3 October 1965, as previously the President had been appointed by the National Assembly. At the time, the country was a one-party state, with the Voltaic Democratic Union–African Democratic Rally (UDV–RDA) as the sole legal party. Its leader, Maurice Yaméogo, was the only candidate, and was re-elected with 100% of the vote. Voter turnout was 98.4%.

== Results ==
Candidate	Party	Votes	%
Maurice Yaméogo	UDV–RDA	2,146,481	100.00
Total		2,146,481	100.00
Valid votes		2,146,481	99.99
Invalid/blank votes		309	0.01
Total votes		2,146,790	100.00
Registered voters/turnout		2,182,425	98.37
Source: Sternberger et al.
