= African Regroupment Party (Upper Volta) =

Republic of Upper Volta political party

African Regroupment Party (in French: Parti du Regroupement Africain) was a political party in the Republic of Upper Volta (known as Burkina Faso since August 1984). The interterritorial PRA had established a strong section in Upper Volta in 1958. This party disappeared as the country became a single-party state under the Voltaic Democratic Union (UDV-RDA).

Following the coup of 1966, PRA was reconstituted. It emerged as one of the major political factions. In the 1978 legislative elections it came fourth, thus losing its legal status (the 1977 Constitution limited the number of political parties to three), and subsequently PRA merged into UDV-RDA.
