= Mamadou Ouédraogo =

Burkinabè politician (c. 1906–1978)

Mamadou Ouédraogo (~1906 – 9 September 1978) was an Upper Voltese politician from Ouahigouya .

One of the early leaders of the Voltaic Union, Ouédraogo represented Ouahigouyain in the Territorial Assembly from 1946 to 1952. From 1948 to 1956 he was a member of the National Assembly of France. He did not stand for reelection in 1956.
