= Toma, Burkina Faso =

Coordinates: 12°46′N 2°53′W

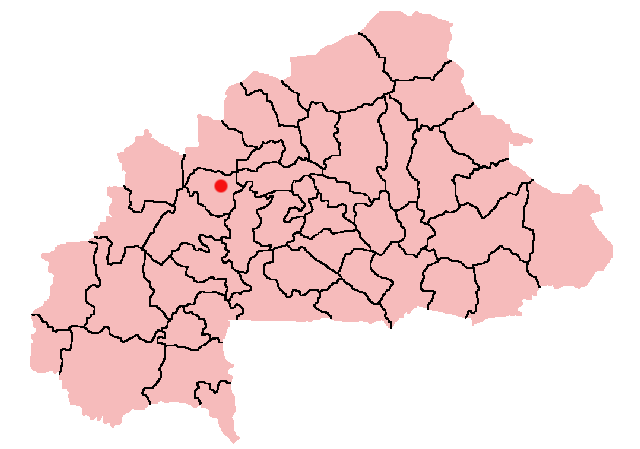
- Location within Burkina Faso, West Africa
- Country: Burkina Faso

Population (2019 census)
  - Total: 15,851
- Time zone: UTC+0 (GMT)

Toma is the capital of Nayala Province in Burkina Faso.
