= 1966 Upper Voltan coup d'état =

1966 coup in Burkina Faso

Date	3 January 1966; 60 years ago
Location	Upper Volta
Result	Coup successful, Yaméogo and the ADR removed from power, new military government sets 4-year transition to civilian rule

Belligerents
(Republic of Upper Volta) Government; African Democratic Rally	Superior Council of the Armed Forces; Trade unions

Commanders and leaders
Maurice Yaméogo	Sangoulé Lamizana

The 1966 Upper Voltan coup d'état was an event which took place on 3 January 1966 in the Republic of Upper Volta (today Burkina Faso), when following large-scale popular unrest, the military intervened against the government. This forced President Maurice Yaméogo to resign, and was replaced by Lieutenant Colonel Sangoulé Lamizana. Lamizana would go on to rule until 1980, when yet another military coup d'état overthrew him. The 1966 coup would prove to be the first in a long line of Upper Voltan and later Burkinabé coups, which marked the beginning of half a century of military rule.

== History ==
=== Background ===
French Upper Volta, a small, landlocked and largely impoverished colony of France had been decolonized in 1960. Maurice Yaméogo, a close ally of the Ivorian President Félix Houphouët-Boigny, created a single-party dictatorship, making his own Voltaic Democratic Union the sole legal political party in the country. Opposition parties, like the African Regroupment Party, were either merged with it or dissolved.

Yaméogo's government would come to face charges of neocolonialism, as it aligned closely with the French government. Originally favouring a pan-Africanist policy, in favour of a West African federation, he eventually dropped these policies in favour of the anti-federalism of France and his friend Houphouët-Boigny. He joined the Conseil de l'Entente together with some other pro-French leaders. Additionally, Yaméogo closely supported Israel, becoming the first African leader to visit the country, strongly opposing the Arab Republic of Egypt and Gamal Abdel Nasser.

The President's harsh policies, and deeply corrupt state of his administration, made him hugely impopular. In 1964, the government strongly restricted the right of workers to organize and outlawed labour strikes, making the strong trade unions its enemies. In the presidential election the following year Yaméogo was re-elected, with a supposed 100% support and 98.4% turnout. Remarrying a 22-year-old former beauty queen a few weeks after the October election, he received a cool welcome in Ouagadougou returning from their honeymoon on 6 November. The parliamentary election the following day officially saw a 100% support and 97.4% turnout in favour of the Voltaic Democratic Union, but in fact mass abstention in protest against the President and his party took place. Another large boycott occurred during the following 5 December municipal elections.

=== Coup ===
On 30 December, following increased economic troubles, the government announced a new austerity budget, massively cutting the salaries of public sector employees and raising taxes. The following day, Denis Yaméogo – Minister of the Interior and Security, and the President's half-brother – used heavy-handed force to break up a meeting of the national labour leadership. As a result, a general strike was called.

On 1 January 1966 President Yaméogo declared a state of emergency in the country. On 2 January he deployed troops to all public buildings, and warned government employees against participating in the general strike. Finally, on 3 January, the general strike began. Large groups of protesting workers stormed the ruling party headquarters and the National Assembly. The state of emergency and troop deployments backfired on the government – the rank and file soldiers refused to shoot protesters.

Within short, the military leadership stepped in. Lieutenant Colonel Sangoulé Lamizana, the Chief of Staff, seized power. President Maurice Yaméogo was forced to resign, and was later imprisoned. The following day a new military government was organized, which received the support of the trade unions which ended the general strike. The constitution was suspended and the National Assembly dissolved. A new cabinet was formed with seven military officials and four civilians, the Superior Council of the Armed Forces, with Lamizana at the helm. A Consultative Committee was also formed, with 46 members representing the military, political parties, trade unions, religious leaders, and traditional authorities.

=== Aftermath ===
In the weeks and months following the coup, the new military regime largely continued the policies of the previous civilian one. While the country would move diplomatically towards the Arab states such as Egypt, Algeria and Saudi Arabia, and away from Israel, this did not indicate a break in relations with the West, or that the government had a sectarian character. While Yaméogo was Catholic and Lamizana Muslim, many of the military co-conspirators were also Catholic. A month after the coup, on 1 February, Lamizana visited President Houphouët-Boigny in Abidjan, and on 17 February the junta announced an austerity budget very similar to that of the previous government. Half a year later on 21 September all political activities were banned in the country.

Former President Maurice Yaméogo remained imprisoned following the coup. His son Hermann Yaméogo unsuccessfully tried to free him and restore him to the presidency, for which he got seven years in prison. On May 8, 1969, Yaméogo was condemned to five years of forced work and to a lifetime banishment. However, he was freed on August 5, 1970. While in prison, he attempted to take his own life unsuccessfully.

The new military government set 1970 as a deadline for the return to civilian governance. Lieutenant Colonel Sangoulé Lamizana – later made Major General – would instead remain President for fourteen years, until his overthrow by Colonel Saye Zerbo on 25 November 1980.

== See also ==
- History of Burkina Faso
