= Voltaic Union =

Political party in Upper Volta

Voltaic Union Union voltaïque
- Leader: Joseph Conombo; Henri Guissou; Joseph Ouedraogo; Maurice Yaméogo
- Founded: June 1946
- Dissolved: 1955
- Preceded by: UDIHV
- Succeeded by: PSEMA; MPA
- Ideology: Nationalism
- Continental affiliation: Indépendants d'Outre-Mer

The Voltaic Union (French: Union voltaïque) was a political party in Upper Volta. It was formed soon after World War II on the initiative of the French governor Albert Mouragues, and Mouragues was accused of interference in the June 1948 local elections on behalf of the party. Also known as the Union pour la Défense des Interêts de la Haute Volta (UDIHV), it was an alliance of young Catholic-trained Voltans and traditional chiefs opposed to domination by the Ivory Coast. Early members included Joseph Conombo, Henri Guissou, Joseph Ouedraogo and Maurice Yaméogo.

In 1948 the party joined Senghor's parliamentary initiative, Indépendants d'Outre-Mer (IOM).

In the 1951 elections UV sent four members to the National Assembly: Dr. Joseph Conombo, Henri Guissou, Nazi Boni and Mamadou Ouédraogo.

However, when its main backer, Governor Mouragues, left Upper Volta in 1953, the unity of UV became fragile. In 1955 Conombo and Guissou formed a new party, the Social Party for the Emancipation of the African Masses (PSEMA). Similarly Nazi Boni founded the African Popular Movement (MPA) the same year.
