= Saye Zerbo =

President of Upper Volta from 1980 to 1982

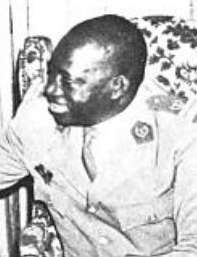
- Zerbo in 1982

President of Upper Volta
- In office 25 November 1980 – 7 November 1982
- Preceded by: Sangoulé Lamizana
- Succeeded by: Jean-Baptiste Ouédraogo

Prime Minister of Upper Volta
- In office 25 November 1980 – 7 November 1982
- Preceded by: Joseph Conombo
- Succeeded by: Thomas Sankara

Foreign Minister of Upper Volta
- In office 11 February 1974 – 9 February 1976
- Preceded by: Joseph Conombo
- Succeeded by: Alfred Kabore

Personal details
- Born: 27 August 1932 Tougan, French West Africa (now Burkina Faso)
- Died: 19 September 2013 (aged 81) Ouagadougou, Burkina Faso
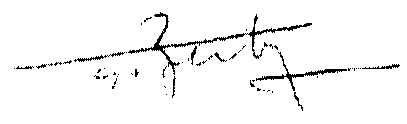
- Signature

Military service
- Allegiance: France; Upper Volta
- Years of service: 1950–1982
- Rank: Colonel
- Battles/wars: First Indochina War; Algerian War

Saye Zerbo (27 August 1932 – 19 September 2013) was a Burkinabé military officer who was the third President of the Republic of Upper Volta (now Burkina Faso) from 25 November 1980 until 7 November 1982.

He led a coup in 1980, but was resisted by trade unions and was overthrown by Major Jean-Baptiste Ouédraogo and the Council of Popular Salvation (CSP).

== Biography ==
Saye Zerbo was born in Tougan, French West Africa, on 27 August 1932. He went to school in Mali and Saint-Louis, Senegal. Then he joined the French military in 1950 and attended the military academy Saint-Cyr. As a paratrooper, Zerbo took part in both the First Indochina War and the Algerian War of Independence. After Upper Volta's independence from France in 1960, he transferred to that country's army in 1961.

In the military government of Sangoulé Lamizana, who ruled Upper Volta from 1966, Saye Zerbo was minister of foreign affairs from 1974 to 1976. He also held the positions of commander of the regiment in the capital Ouagadougou and director of the military intelligence agency.

On 25 November 1980, Zerbo staged a coup against President Lamizana, who had been re-elected democratically in 1978, and took on the positions of head of state and government. The constitution, which had been introduced in 1977, was suspended and the Military Committee of Recovery for National Progress (Comité Militaire de Redressement pour le Progrès National; CMPRN) established. The trade unions in the country opposed his seizure of power, although they had supported Zerbo for a long time, and on 7 November 1982, Saye Zerbo was deposed in another coup d'état. He was succeeded by Jean-Baptiste Ouédraogo as the head of the Council of Popular Salvation (Conseil du Salut du Peuple; CSP).

After being deposed, Zerbo was also incarcerated. On 4 August 1983, Ouédraogo was deposed by Thomas Sankara. In May 1984, Zerbo and Lamizana were put on trial for various crimes. Zerbo was sentenced to 15 years in prison. During his imprisonment, Zerbo converted from Islam to Christianity. He was released from jail in August 1985. After Blaise Compaoré had deposed Sankara he sought Zerbo's advice. Zerbo's conviction from 1984 was annulled on 18 February 1997 by the supreme court of Burkina Faso.

Zerbo's third daughter Araba Kadidiatou Zerbo is married to the former Prime Minister of Burkina Faso Paramanga Ernest Yonli.

== Economic policies ==
In a press release, the head of the newly formed Military Committee for Recovery and National Progress (CMRPN), explained that the overthrow of General Lamizana was made necessary by the political and economic situation in the country, "characterized by the deterioration of the social climate and all sectors of national life." He also promised to put an end to corruption and to restore the economy. The initiative was rather well received by the Voltaic people. The traditional chiefs "believe that the event constitutes an unexpected opportunity for the country and for the people, whose antagonistic divisions of all kinds […] dangerously and daily compromised national harmony."

Economically, Upper Volta, whose gross domestic product relies almost exclusively on the agricultural sector and which sends several hundred thousand of its citizens to seek work abroad, unable to find any, suffered in 1980 from a severe drought that burned crops. Finally, on the political front, nepotism and the personalization of party life have become such phenomena that they prevent the sound management of the country's affairs.

The regime's ruling body, the Military Committee for Reform and National Progress (CMRPN), promptly indicated its intention to radically break with past practices and policies and to initiate bold reforms such as financial and budgetary austerity, moralization of the public service, and rationalization of the management of state enterprises.

Upon his accession to power, Zerbo promised to put an end to the corruption that was undermining the country. Within the National Council of the Armed Forces, he called upon young officers Thomas Sankara, Blaise Compaoré, and Henri Zongo to assist him (If Jean-Baptiste Boukary Lingani and Gabriel Somé Yorian assisted him is unknown). But the colonel quickly took unpopular measures. The head of state refused to engage with political leaders, froze salaries, and suspended the right to strike. For the people of Upper Volta, accustomed to listening to their union leaders, this was the final straw.

Compaoré resigned from his office because of the failure of the planned and improvised policies. Tired of Zerbo's abuses of power, his closest collaborators also distanced themselves from the head of state. Thomas Sankara, then Secretary of State for Information, resoundingly resigned in May 1982: "Woe to those who gag their people!" he declared, followed shortly after by Captains Zongo and Compaoré. Captain Zongo and Captain Sankara did the same. Sankara resigned on April 12, 1982, making his action the focus of media attention. Henri Zongo had preceded him a mere week earlier, on April 8, 1982. The trio were arrested and exiled far from the capital.

The government of Zerbo was more interventionist than the Lamizana government, similar to the government of his successor Ouédraogo. Main differences between the economic policies of Zerbo and Ouédraogo were that Ouédraogo was a supporter of private ownership for businesses, which could be explained that he saw himself as a "liberal and sincere democrat".
