= Joseph Ki-Zerbo =

Burkinabé historian, politician and writer

Chairman of Party for Democracy and Progress / Socialist Party
- In office 2001–2005

Personal details
- Born: June 21, 1922 Toma, French Upper Volta
- Died: December 4, 2006 (aged 84) Ouagadougou, Burkina Faso
- Party: MLN
- Spouse: Jacqueline Ki-Zerbo
- Occupation: Author
- Awards: Right Livelihood Award

Joseph Ki-Zerbo (June 21, 1922 – December 4, 2006, Burkina Faso) was a Burkinabé historian, politician and writer. He is recognized as one of Africa's foremost thinkers.

From 1972 to 1978 he was a professor of African History at the University of Ouagadougou. In 1983, he was forced into exile, only being able to return in 1992.

Ki-Zerbo founded the Party for Democracy and Progress / Socialist Party. He was its chairman until 2005, and represented it in the Burkina Faso parliament until his death in 2006. A socialist and an advocate of African independence and unity, Ki-Zerbo was also a vocal opponent of Thomas Sankara's revolutionary government.

== Early life ==
Ki-Zerbo was born in Toma in the province of Nayala, in what was, at that time, the French colony of Upper Volta. He was the son of Alfred Diban Ki-Zerbo and Thérèse Folo Ki. His father is considered to be the first Burkinabé Christian. In 1915 he intervened during the Volta-Bani War to stop Toma from being razed to the ground.

Between 1933 and 1940, Ki-Zerbo was educated at the Catholic primary school in Toma, then completed his secondary school at the preparatory seminaries in Pabré in the Province of Kadiogo and Faladié, a district of Bamako, Mali. He then attended the Grand Séminaire Saint-Pierre Claver at Koumi near Bobo Dioulasso, which trains young men for the Catholic priesthood.

However, Ki-Zerbo dropped out of the seminary and went to live in Dakar, Senegal for several years. In addition to teaching there, he worked for several months at the weekly newspaper Afrique nouvelle, and also as a railway construction labourer.

Ki-Zerbo continued his education part-time and, when he obtained his Baccalaureate in 1949 at the age of 27, he earned a scholarship to study in Paris. He studied history and law at the Sorbonne and also followed courses in politics at the Sciences Po. On completion of his studies, he became a certified history and geography teacher, the first from Upper Volta.

After his studies, Ki-Zerbo became a French citizen and was employed as a history and geography teacher in Orléans, Paris and Dakar. During a visit to Mali, Ki-Zerbo met his wife, educator and activist Jacqueline Coulibaly.

== Political activities ==
Ki-Zerbo's political activities started while he was a student. He was the co-founder and president of the Association of Upper Volta Students in France (1950–1956). He was also the president of the Association of African, Caribbean and Malagash Christian Students. In 1954, Ki-Zerbo published an article in the newspaper Tam-Tam with the title “On demande des nationalistes” (“We ask the nationalists”). In Paris, Ki-Zerbo met other intellectuals, such as the Senegalese historian Cheik Anta Diop and Abdoulaye Wade, who later became president of Senegal.

The 1950s was a decade of great optimism in Africa, with many leaders demanding independence. Ki-Zerbo was active in this movement for change, and in 1957 he created a political party, the Mouvement de Liberation Nationale (MLN) (National Freedom Movement). He also established contact with Kwame Nkrumah, president of the newly independent neighboring state of Ghana.

The aims of the MLN were immediate independence for Africans, the creation of a United States of Africa, and socialism. The MLN contacted nationalist leaders in many of the other French colonies, to persuade them to reject the referendum on the creation of a Franco-African community presented by the French president Charles de Gaulle. However, in the whole of West Africa at that time, only Guinea voted no to the referendum and, as a result, achieved its independence relatively early in 1958. As a result, Sekou Touré, the first president of independent Guinea, invited Ki-Zerbo and his wife along with other volunteers to come to Conakry to replace the French teachers who had left.

In 1960, Ki-Zerbo returned to newly independent Upper Volta, explaining to Sekou Touré: "I have to go back home to pursue the fight for independence in others territories”. In 1965, he was nominated as academy inspector and general director of Youth, Sports and Education.

Ki-Zerbo was professor at the University of Ouagadougou from 1968 to 1973. He was the co-founder and general director (1967 to 1979) of the Conseil africain et malgache pour l'enseignement supérieur (African and Malagasy Council on Higher Education, CAMES) that ensures the academic autonomy of Africans countries.

== Social and political ideas ==
Ki-Zerbo declared that growing up in a rural area in a big family profoundly influenced his personality and thoughts.

Ki-Zerbo exposed his social and political ideas in many publications on history and culture. He wrote a teaching manual called Le Monde Africain Noire (Black African World), published in 1963. In 1972, Ki-Zerbo published the famous Histoire de l’Afrique Noire (History of Black Africa) that became a reference book in African history. Holenstein (2006) described that, in his book, Ki-Zerbo challenged the common belief of Africa as a black continent without culture and history. He claimed that Africa had reached an upper level of political, social and cultural development before the Atlantic slave trade and colonization. Written only few years after independence, Histoire de l’Afrique Noire represented the hope of many Africans of a brighter future in liberty and self-determination.

Sitchet (2003), an Africultures reporter, argued that from 1972 to 1978 Ki-Zerbo was an executive member of UNESCO (United Nations Education Scientific and Cultural Organization). From 1976 to 2001, Ki-Zerbo was the president of the African Historian Association and a professor at the University of Ouagadougou.

His conviction on education led him to found in 1980 the Centre for African Development Studies (CEDA) that has this goal “on ne developpe pas, on se developpe” ("we don’t develop, we develop ourselves"). Holenstein (2006) insisted that on the basis of a critique of North–South imperialism, Ki-Zerbo forecast an endogenous development that will take ecological and social skills, and the African cultural identity, seriously. His endogenous development is a practice that lets native farmers use their own ideas and traditions alongside new technology. It incorporates the ideas and knowledge of indigenous cultures rather than disregarding them.

== Political fights ==
After scientific research and teaching, Ki-Zerbo continued with his political activities. Under the Burkinabe President Maurice Yaméogo’s regime (1960-1966), the creation of any political party was forbidden. Holenstein (2006) explained this in an article on the interview about Ki-Zerbo’s book A quand l’Afrique. Ki-Zerbo got his members in the syndical teachers’ class and villagers. The syndicate and MLN played a big role in the popular movement organization on 3 January 1966 that brought down the President Maurice Yaméogo. General Secretary of the MLN, Ki-Zerbo went to the 1970s legislative elections; he got sixth rank.

In February the Burkina Faso parliament was ruined during a military coup. In October, banning was cancelled. Many new parties arose like Union Progressiste Voltaique (UPV) under the control of Ki-Zerbo that replaced MLN. UPV was in opposition to the government party (Union Democratique Voltaique-Rassemblement Democratique Africain (UDV-RDA).)

== Exile ==
In 1983, a group of young officers took power by a military coup under the control of the Captain Thomas Sankara. A new stage started for Upper Volta which became Burkina Faso (“Land of the upright”). Under the power of the new government, Ki-Zerbo was obliged to go into exile.

In 1985 he was finally arrested with his family for two years of detention and became free only after another military coup organized by Blaise Compaore. Even in exile, he created research centers like the Research Centre for Endogenous Development (CRDE) and taught at Cheikh Anta Diop University in Dakar. He returned to Burkina Faso in 1987 to find that his library of 11,000 books in his hometown Faso had been burned in his absence. He came back and tried to rebuild by getting a place in parliament.

== Awards ==
Ki-Zerbo has received recognition through various international awards.

- In 1997 he was honoured with the Right Livelihood Award for his research on development. This prize is given to those who try to find credible solutions to the protection of the environment and nature; it is for people who helped the development of human rights and peace.
- In 2000, he received the Al-Gaddafi International Prize for Human Rights.
- In 2001, Ki-Zerbo was awarded the title of Doctor Honoris Causa of the University of Padua in Italy.

== Bibliography ==
Ki-Zerbo as an historian has published books with endogenous development as the central theme:

- 1964: Le Monde africain noir (Paris: Hatier)
- 1972: Histoire de l’Afrique noire (Paris: Hatier)
- 1991: Histoire générale de l’Afrique
- 2003: A quand l'Afrique, co-authored with René Holenstein (Editions de l’Aube)
- 2005: Afrique Noire, co-authored with Didier Ruef (Infolio éditions)

In 2004, his book A quand l'Afrique was awarded the RFI prize "Témoin du monde".

In addition, Ki-Zerbo was a committed historian and politician. Ki-Zerbo extended his fights internationally to make people recognize slavery as a crime against humanity and that Africa should get reparations for this. He tried to combine science and political activity. Ki-Zerbo summed his philosophy up in the following quote:

“The Africa which the world needs is a continent able to stand up, to walk on its own feet… it is an Africa conscious of its own past and able to keep on reinvesting this past into its present and future.”
