= African Democratic Rally (Burkina Faso) =

Political party in Burkina Faso

African Democratic Rally Rassemblement Démocratique Africain
- Founded: 1957
- Headquarters: Ouagadougou, Burkina Faso
- National affiliation: Alliance for Democracy and Federation – African Democratic Rally
- Regional affiliation: African Democratic Rally

The African Democratic Rally (Rassemblement Démocratique Africain) is a political party in Burkina Faso. It was formed in 1957 as the Voltaic section of the African Democratic Rally (RDA) and was originally known as the Voltaic Democratic Union-African Democratic Rally (UDV-RDA). In 1960, UDV-RDA formed a civilian dictatorship in Upper Volta until it was overthrown in the 1966 military coup, later returning to electoral politics. Today, it is part of the Alliance for Democracy and Federation – African Democratic Rally, the largest of the many opposition parties in Burkina Faso.

== Party history ==
Soon after the country gained independence from France in 1960, UDV-RDA became the only legal political party in Upper Volta and a civilian dictatorship was set up. In 1966, there was a military coup to overthrow the government. Under the rule of Sangoulé Lamizana UDV-RDA was reconstructed and developed good relations with the government. However, there was internal dissent between a pro-Lamizana faction, led by Prime Minister Joseph Conombo, and an anti-Lamizana faction led by Joseph Ouédraogo.

By the 1978 presidential and legislative elections, though the UDV-RDA had a unified party list for the legislature, the factions each favoured a different presidential candidate. The party officially supported Lamizana's candidature. The dissidents, grouped as the 'Rejectors Front-RDA' (Front du Réfus-RDA) supported the candidature of Joseph Ouédrago. After the elections this faction split away and joined the Voltaic Progressive Front of Joseph Ki-Zerbo.

After the elections Lamizana joined the party. The National Union of Independents (UNI) and the African Regroupment Party (PRA) also merged into the party because the 1977 Constitution limited the number of political parties to three, and PRA and UNI had lost their legal status after the election, having come fourth and fifth.

When Lamizana was overthrown in 1980, military rule was reinstituted, and the RDA never returned to power.

== Electoral history ==
=== Presidential Elections ===
Election	Party candidate	Votes	%	Result
1965	Maurice Yaméogo	2,146,481	100%	Elected ✓
1978	Joseph Ouédraogo	167,160	16.57%	Lost ✗
1998	Frédéric Guirma	133,552	5.86%	Lost ✗

=== National Assembly elections ===
Election	Party leader	Votes	%	Seats	+/–	Position	Outcome
1959	Maurice Yaméogo	505,815	56.2%	62 / 75	▲62	▲1st	Supermajority government
1965	Maurice Yaméogo	2,131,950	100%	75 / 75	▲13	1st	Sole legal party
1970	Gérard Kango Ouédraogo	753,166	67.68%	37 / 57	▼38	1st	Majority government
1978	Joseph Conombo	455,329	42.5%	28 / 57	▼9	1st	Minority government
1992	Frédéric Guirma	138,168	11.3%	6 / 107	▲6	▼3rd	Opposition
1997	Frédéric Guirma	136,006	6.44%	2 / 111	▼4	3rd	Opposition

== See also ==
- History of Burkina Faso
