= Republic of Upper Volta =

Former country in West Africa (1958–1984); now Burkina Faso

Coordinates: 12.1°N 1.7°W

Republic of Upper Volta République de Haute-Volta (French)
- 1958–1984
- Flag Coat of arms
- Motto: "Unité – Travail – Justice" (in French) "Unity – Work – Justice"
- Anthem: Hymne National Voltaïque
- Status: Self-governing colony in the French Community (1958–1960); Sovereign state (1960–1984)
- Capital: Ouagadougou
- Common languages: French (official); Mossi; Fula; Gourmanché; Bambara
- Demonym: Upper Voltan
- Government: Presidential republic (1960–1966); Military dictatorship (1966–1984)
- President
  - 1959–1966: Maurice Yaméogo
  - 1966–1980: Sangoulé Lamizana
  - 1980–1982: Saye Zerbo
  - 1982–1983: Jean-Baptiste Ouédraogo
  - 1983–1984: Thomas Sankara
- High Commissioner
  - 1958–1959: Max Berthet
  - 1959–1960: Paul Masson
- Prime Minister
  - 1971–1974: Gérard Kango Ouédraogo
  - 1983: Thomas Sankara
- Historical era: Cold War
  - Self-governing colony: 11 December 1958
  - Independence: 5 August 1960
  - Coup d'état: 3 January 1966
  - Coup d'état: 25 November 1980
  - Coup d'état: 7 November 1982
  - Coup d'état: 4 August 1983
  - Renamed: 4 August 1984

Area
  - Total: 274,200 km^{2} (105,900 sq mi)

Population
  - 1980 estimate: 6,823,000
- Currency: CFA franc
- ISO 3166 code: HV
Preceded by	Succeeded by
French Upper Volta	Burkina Faso
- Today part of: Burkina Faso

The Republic of Upper Volta (French: République de Haute-Volta), or simply Upper Volta, was a landlocked West African country established on 11 December 1958 as a self-governing state within the French Community. Before becoming autonomous, it was part of the French Union as the French Upper Volta. On 5 August 1960, it gained full independence from France. On 4 August 1984, it changed its name to Burkina Faso.

== Etymology ==
The name Upper Volta indicated that the country contains the upper part of the Volta River.

== History ==
Upper Volta obtained independence on 5 August 1960, with Maurice Yaméogo of the Voltaic Democratic Union-African Democratic Rally (UDV-RDA) becoming the country's first president. A constitution was ratified the same year, establishing presidential elections by direct universal suffrage and a National Assembly, both with five-year terms. Shortly after coming to power, Yaméogo banned all political parties other than the UDV-RDA, as a result of a deep authoritarian streak that began prior to his presidency. Between the time he became prime minister of Upper Volta, while it was still a French colony, and independence two years later, his government subjected opposition parties to increased harassment.

On 3 January 1966, Yaméogo was overthrown in a coup d'état led by army chief Sangoulé Lamizana. Although multiparty democracy was nominally restored four years later, Lamizana dominated the country's politics until he was himself overthrown in 1980.

After a series of short-term presidencies, Thomas Sankara came to power through yet another military coup d'état on 4 August 1983. After the coup, he formed the National Council for the Revolution (CNR), with himself as president. Under the direction of Sankara, the country changed its name on 4 August 1984, from Upper Volta to Burkina Faso, which means "Land of Incorruptible People".

== Politics ==
From 1958 to 1960, the Republic of Upper Volta was led by a high commissioner:

- Max Berthet (11 December 1958 to February 1959)
- Paul Masson (February 1959 to 5 August 1960)

From 1971 to 1987, the Republic of Upper Volta was led by a prime minister:

- Gérard Kango Ouédraogo (13 February 1971 to 8 February 1974)
- Thomas Sankara (4 August 1983 to 14 October 1987)

== Symbols ==
=== Flag ===
The three colours of the Upper Volta's national flag are based on the three sections of the Volta:

- The Black Volta;
- The White Volta;
- The Red Volta.
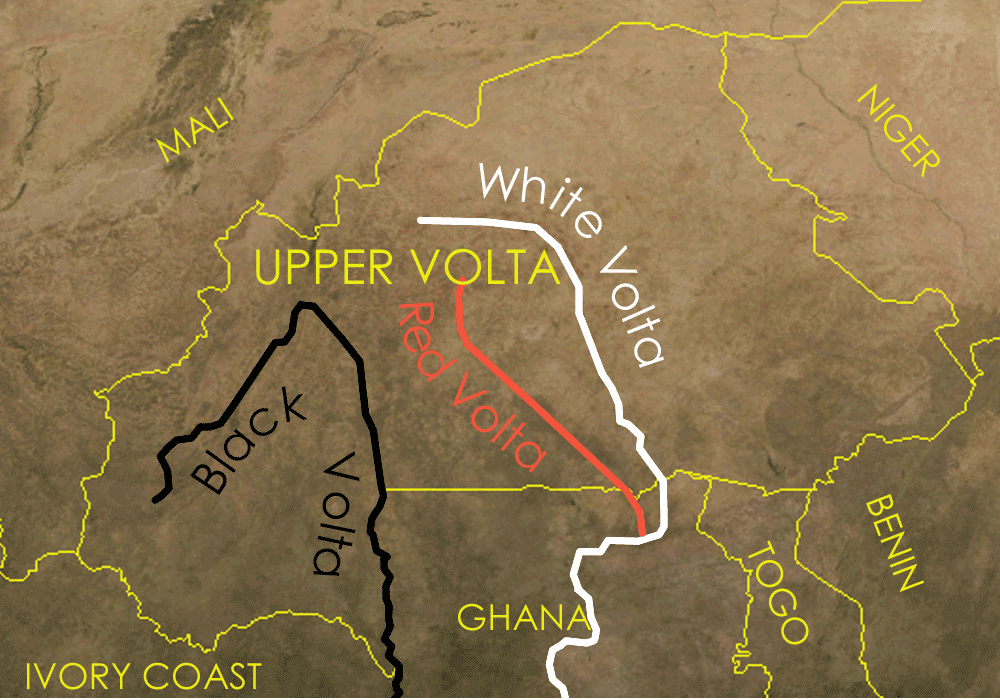
  Map showing the Volta River in Upper Volta

== Cultural references ==
Beginning in the 1970s, politicians, diplomats and journalists sometimes derisively referred to the Soviet Union as "Upper Volta with rockets", implying a disproportionate defence sector compared to a relatively undeveloped civilian economy.

== See also ==
- History of Burkina Faso
- List of governors of Upper Volta
- List of heads of state of Burkina Faso
- List of heads of government of Burkina Faso
