= Ranks and insignia of gendarmeries =

Commissioned officers' and enlisted rank comparison chart of all Gendarmeries.

== Officers ==
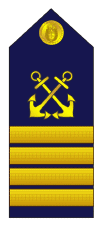
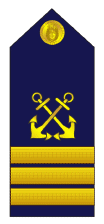
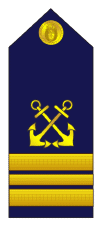
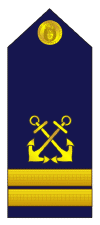
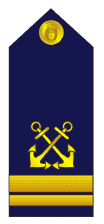
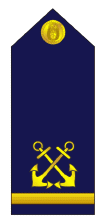
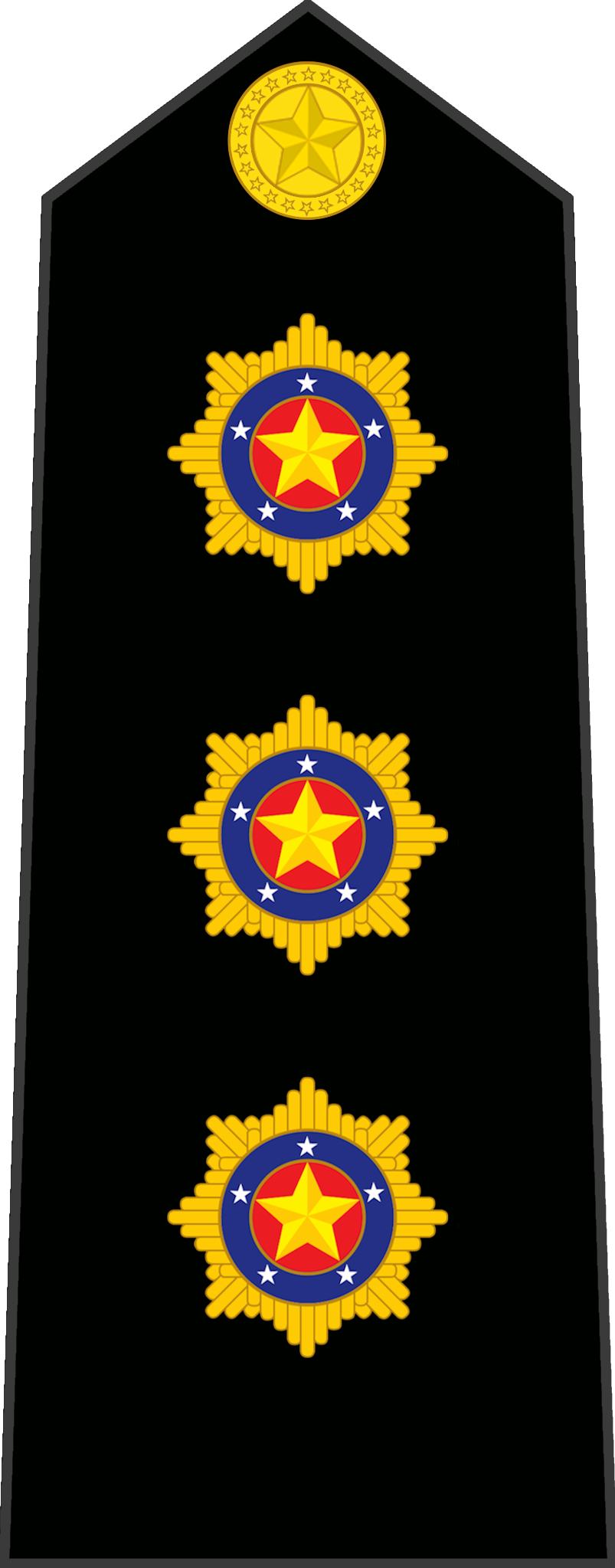
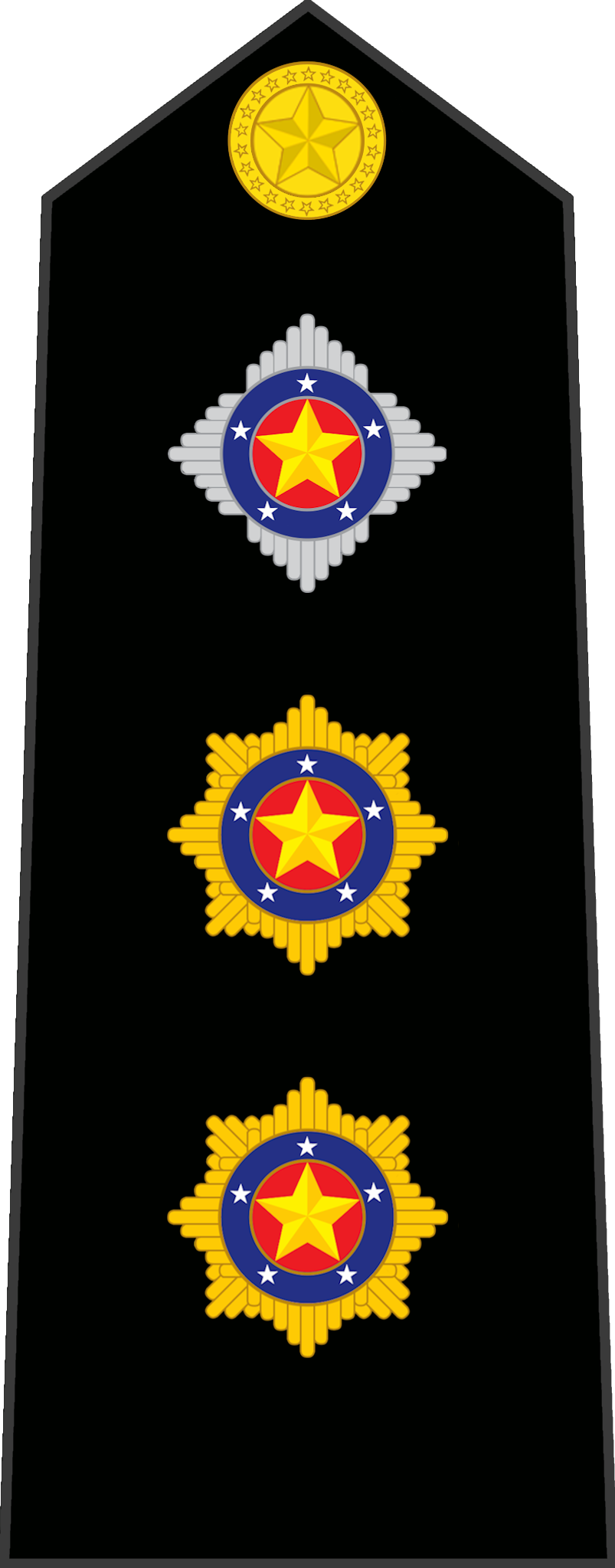
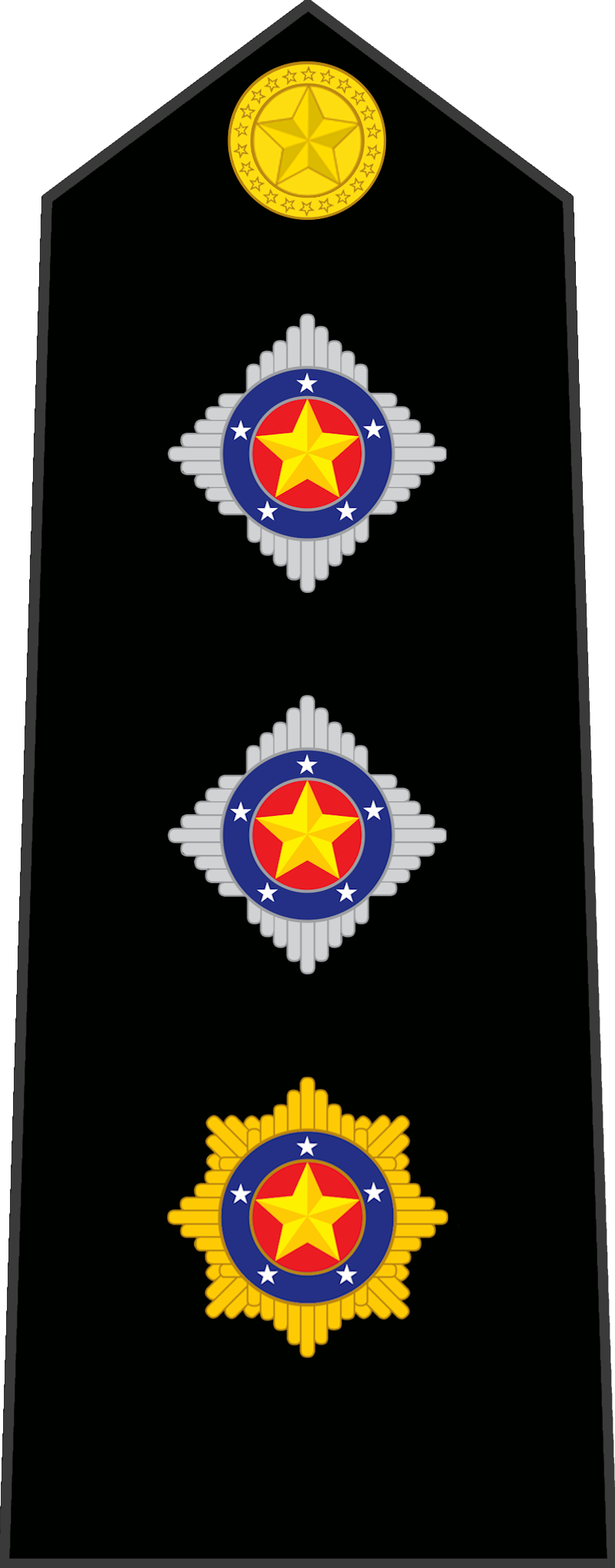
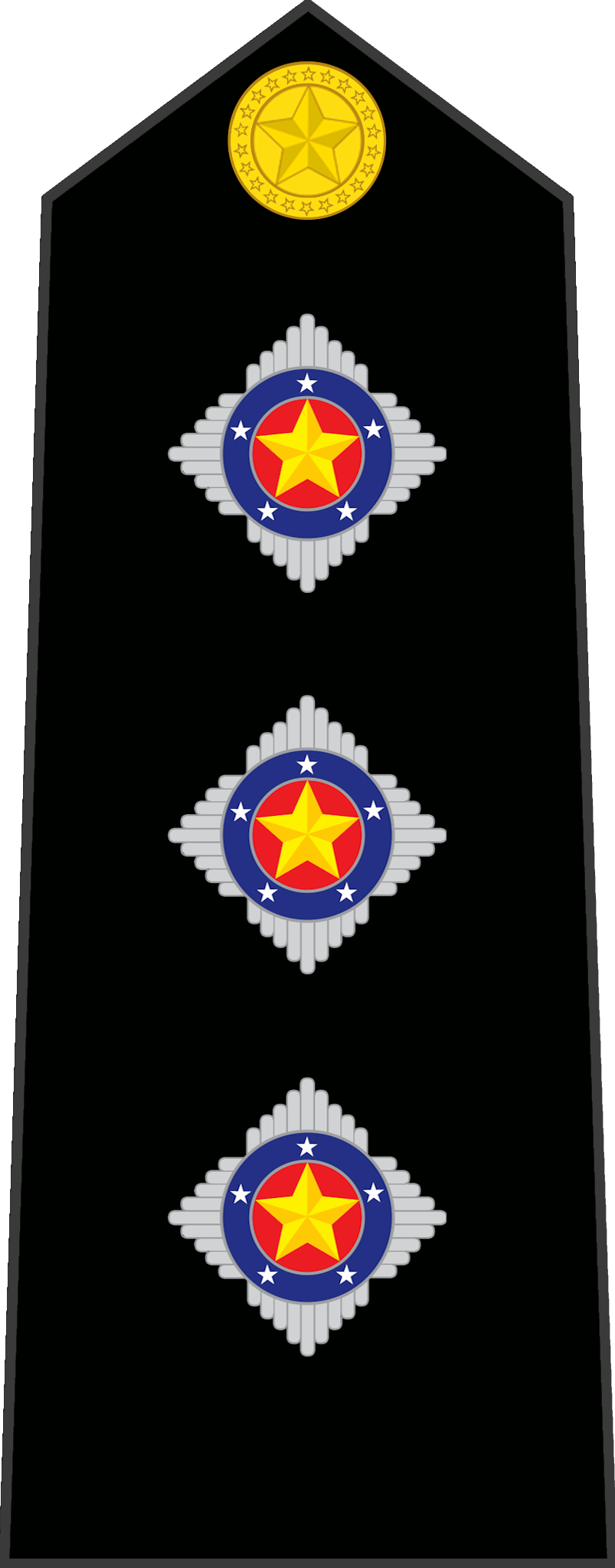
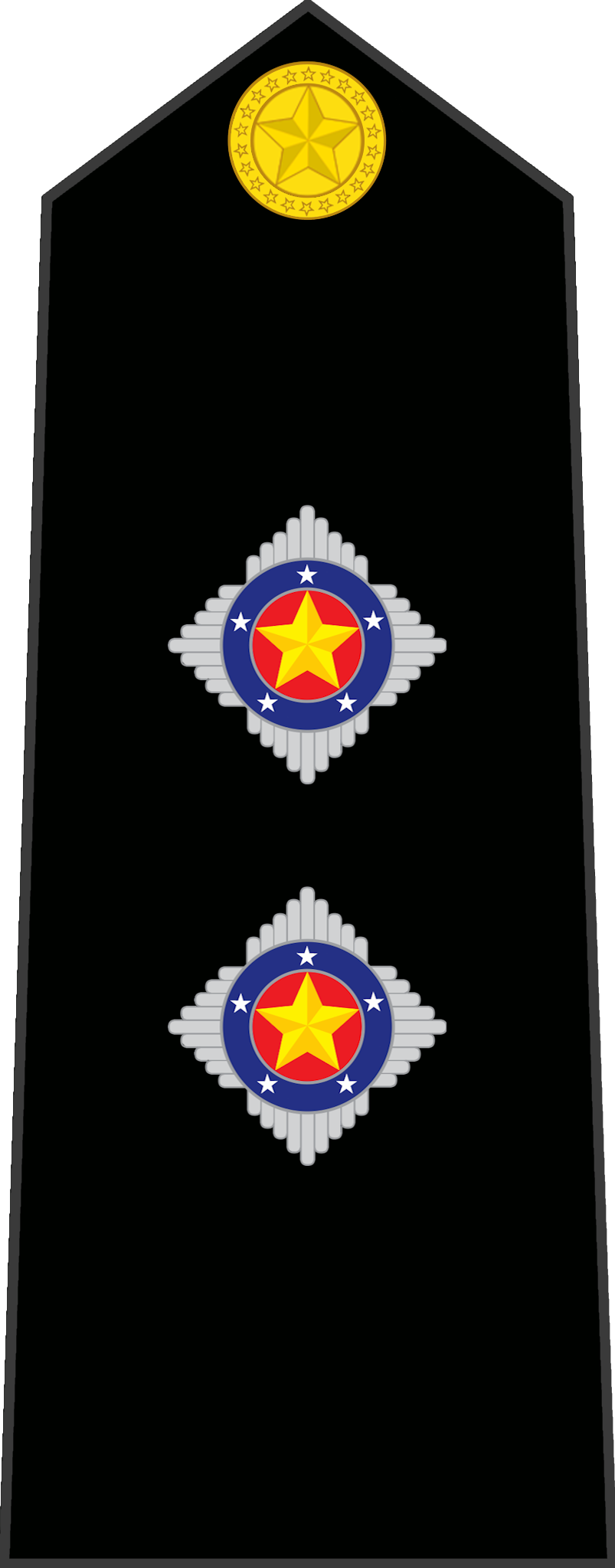
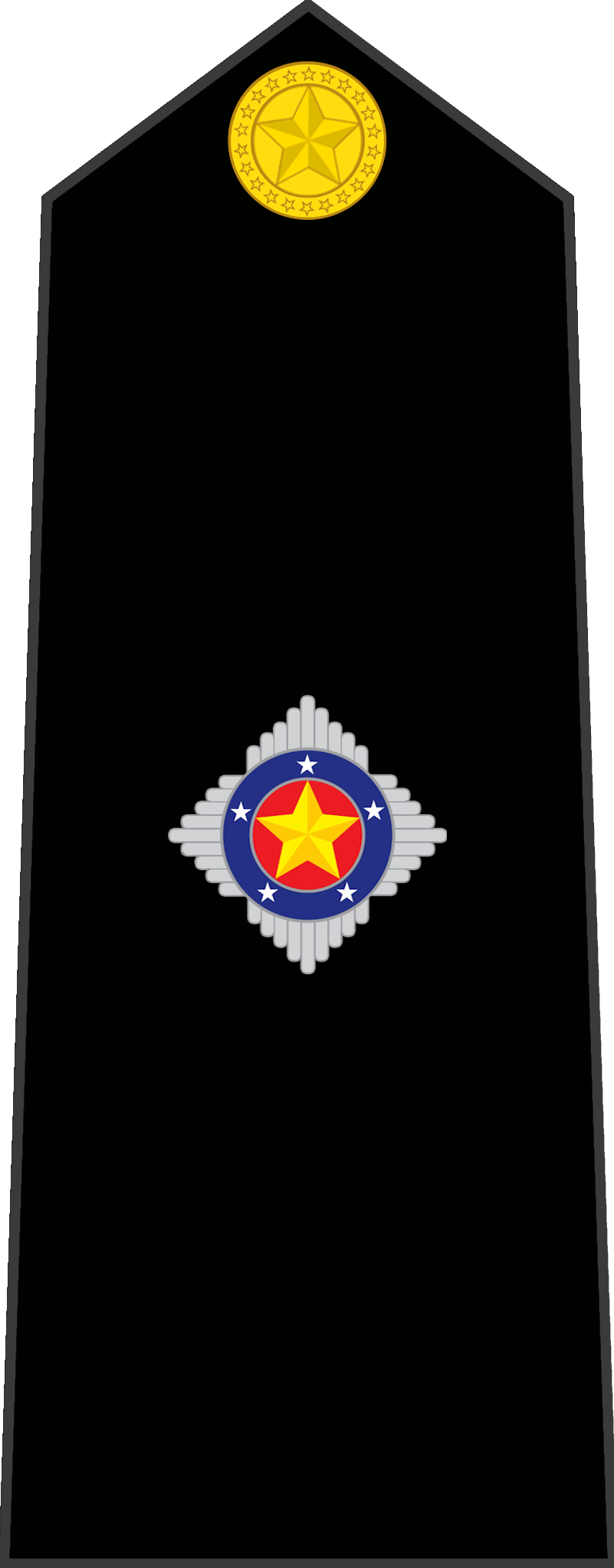
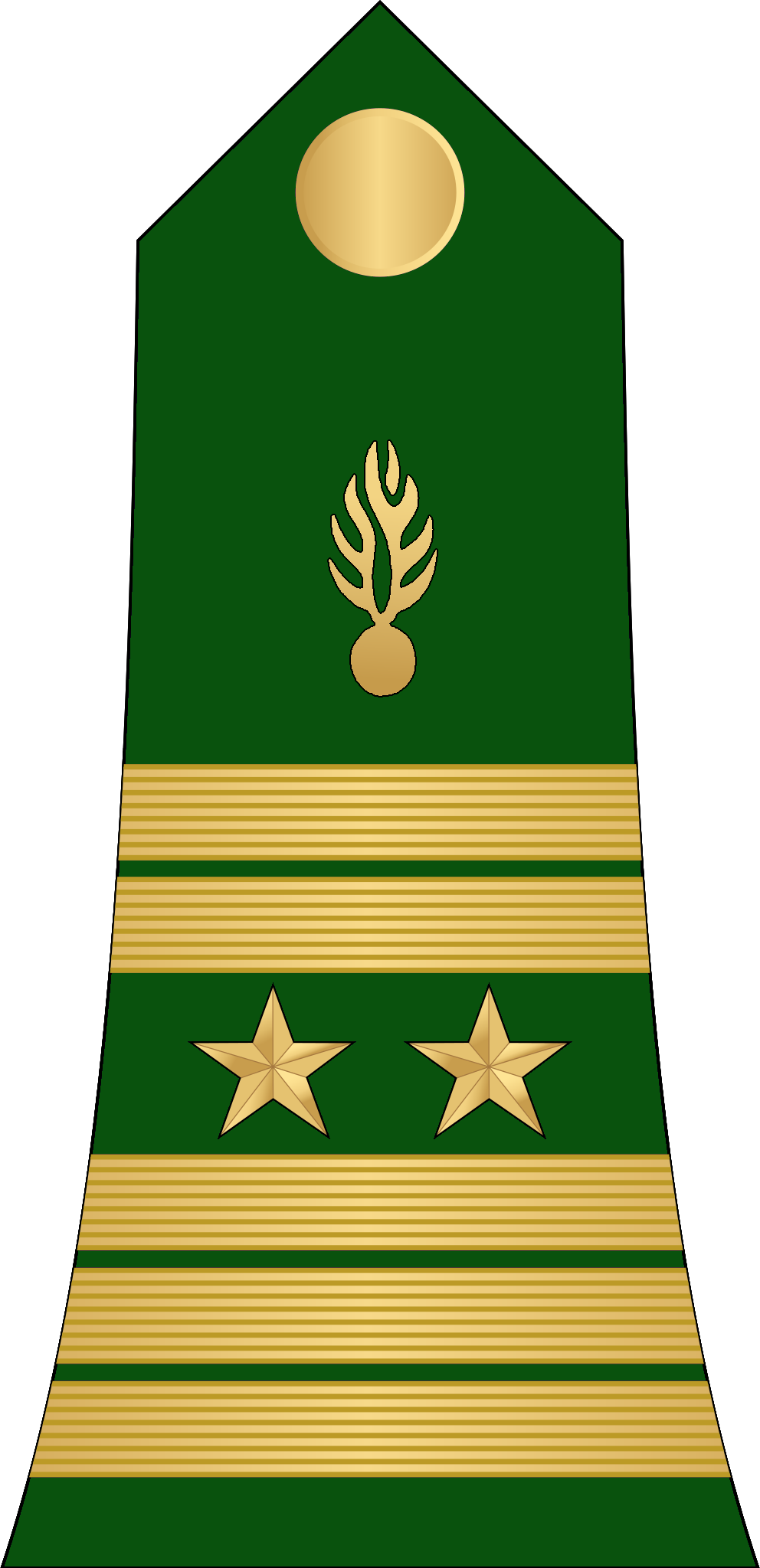
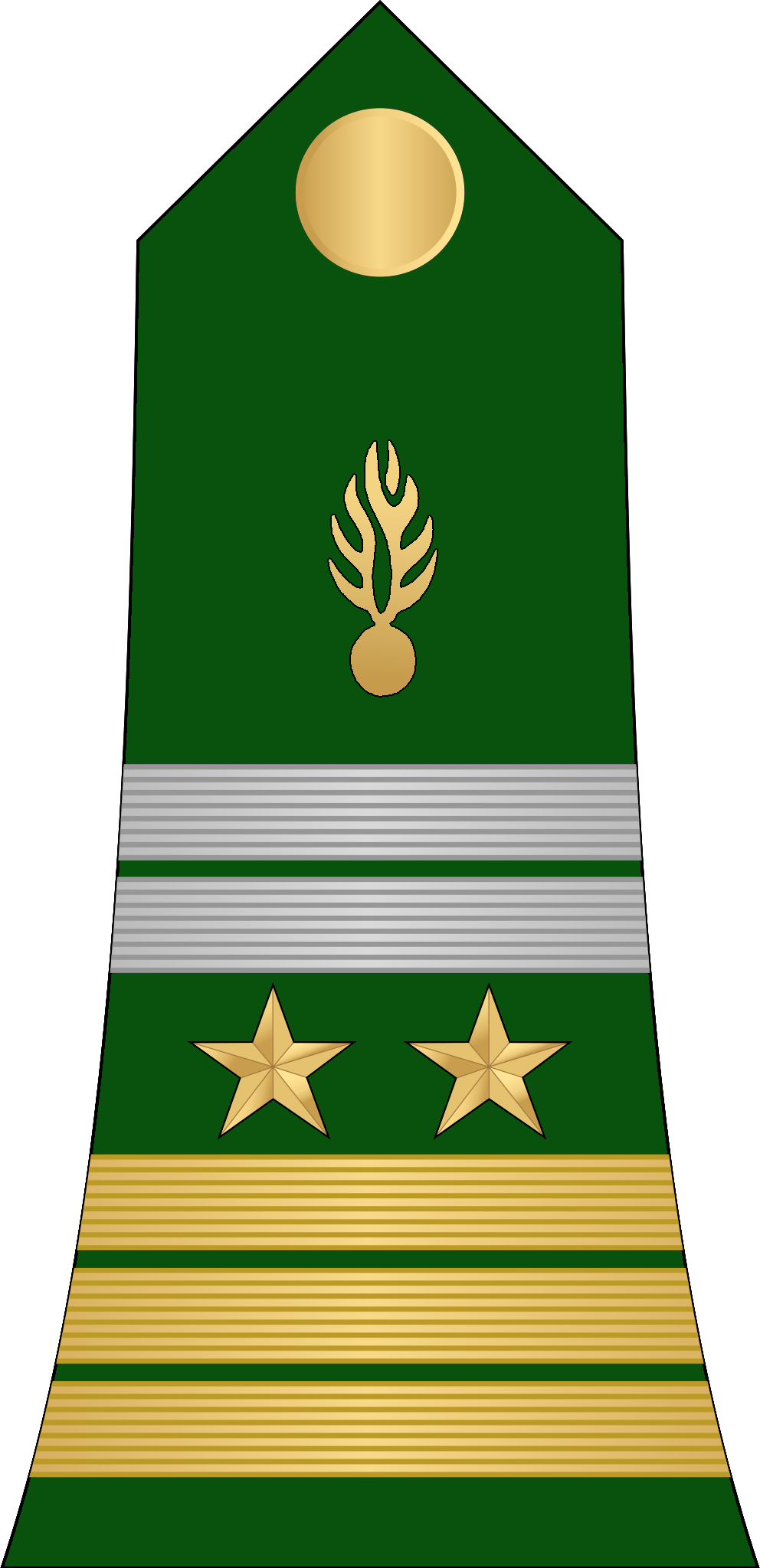
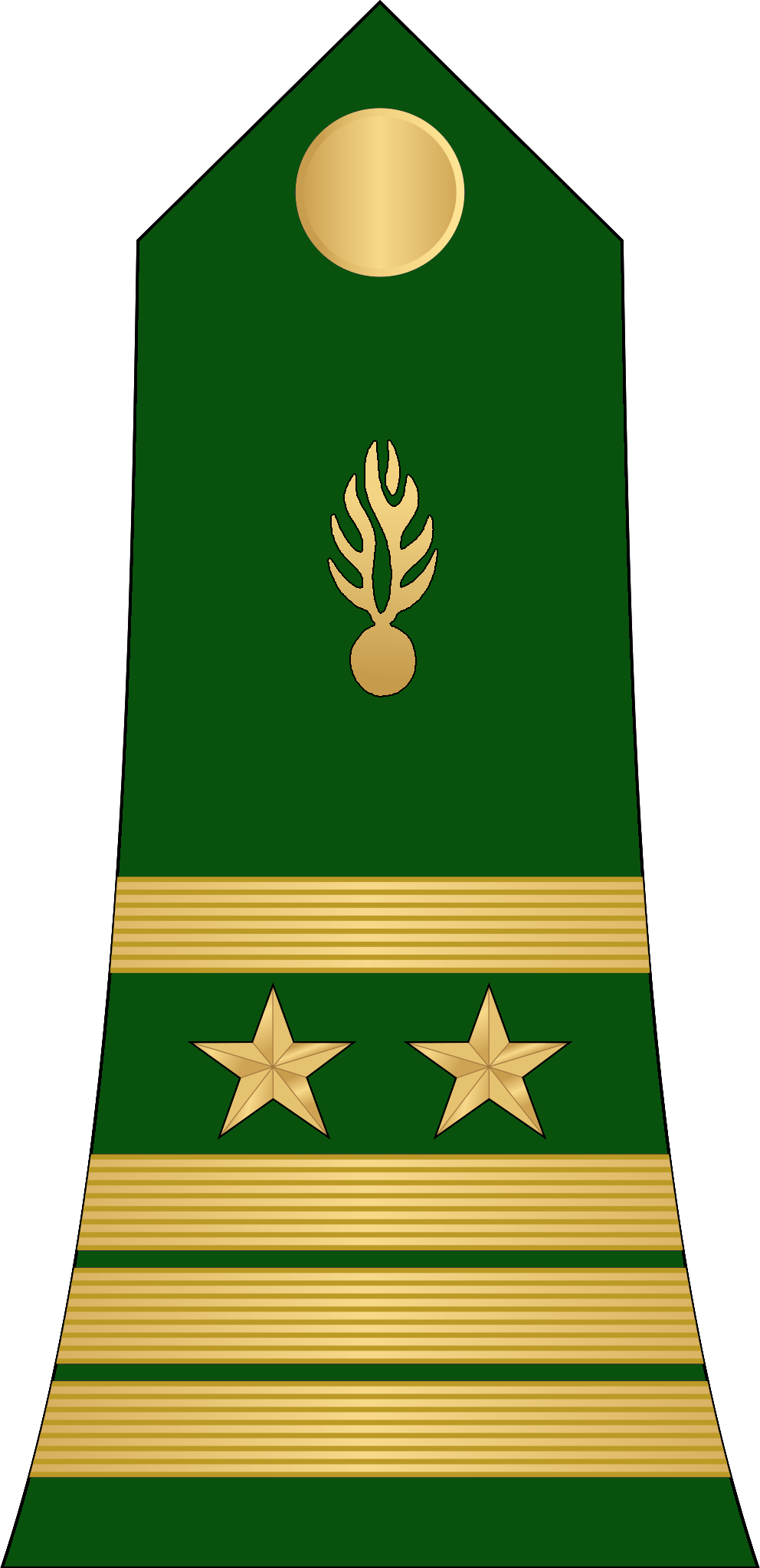
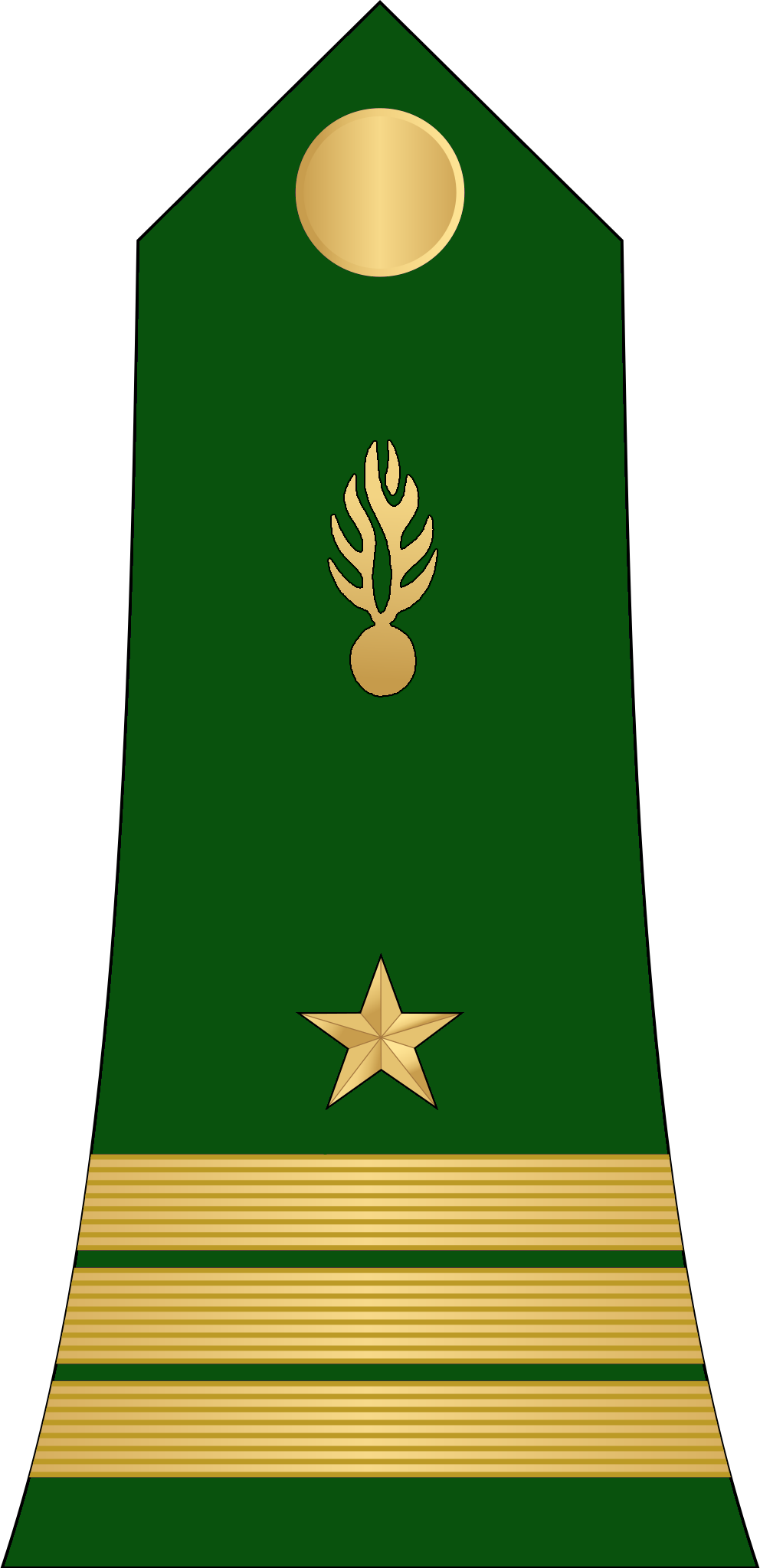
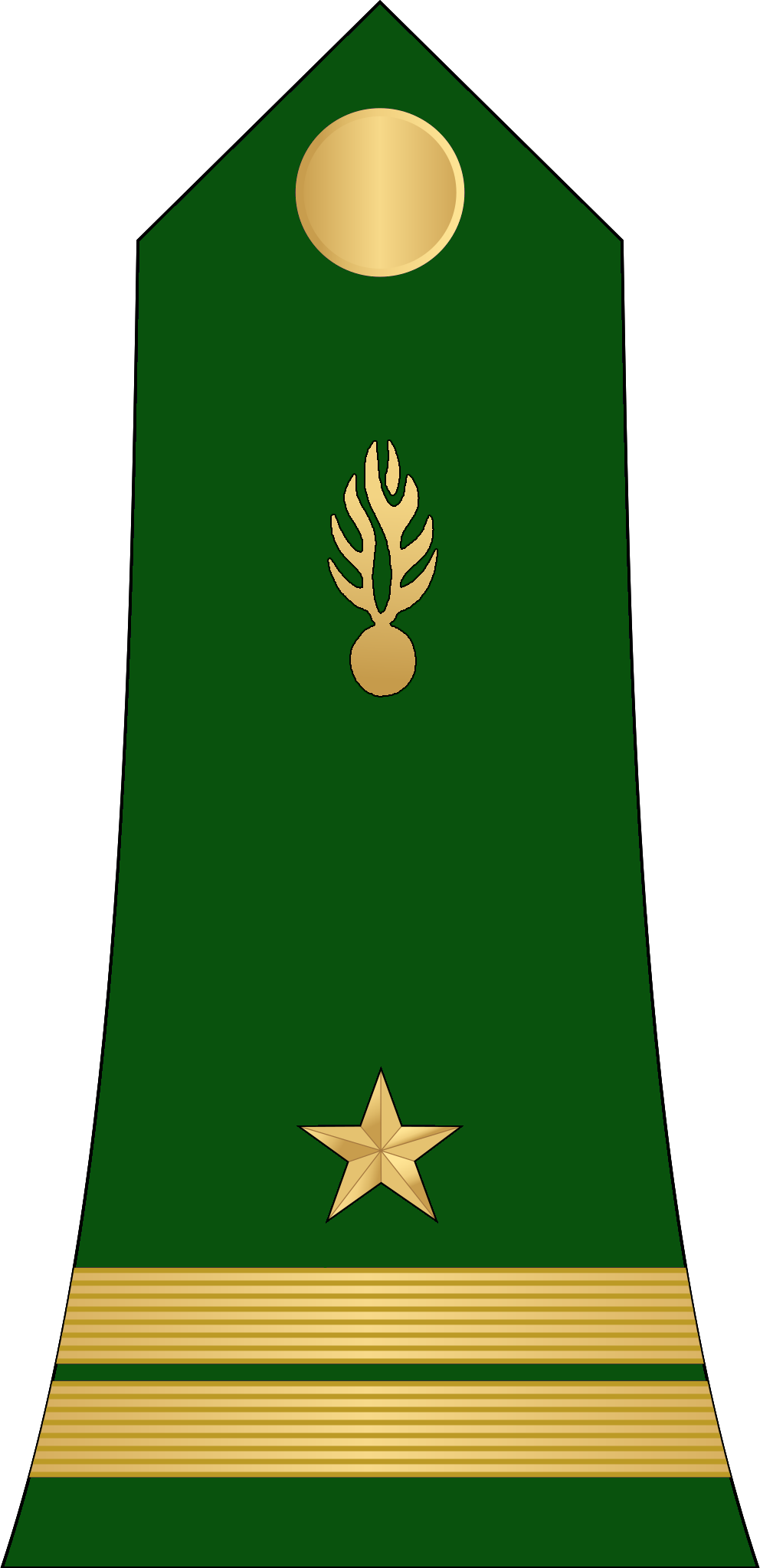
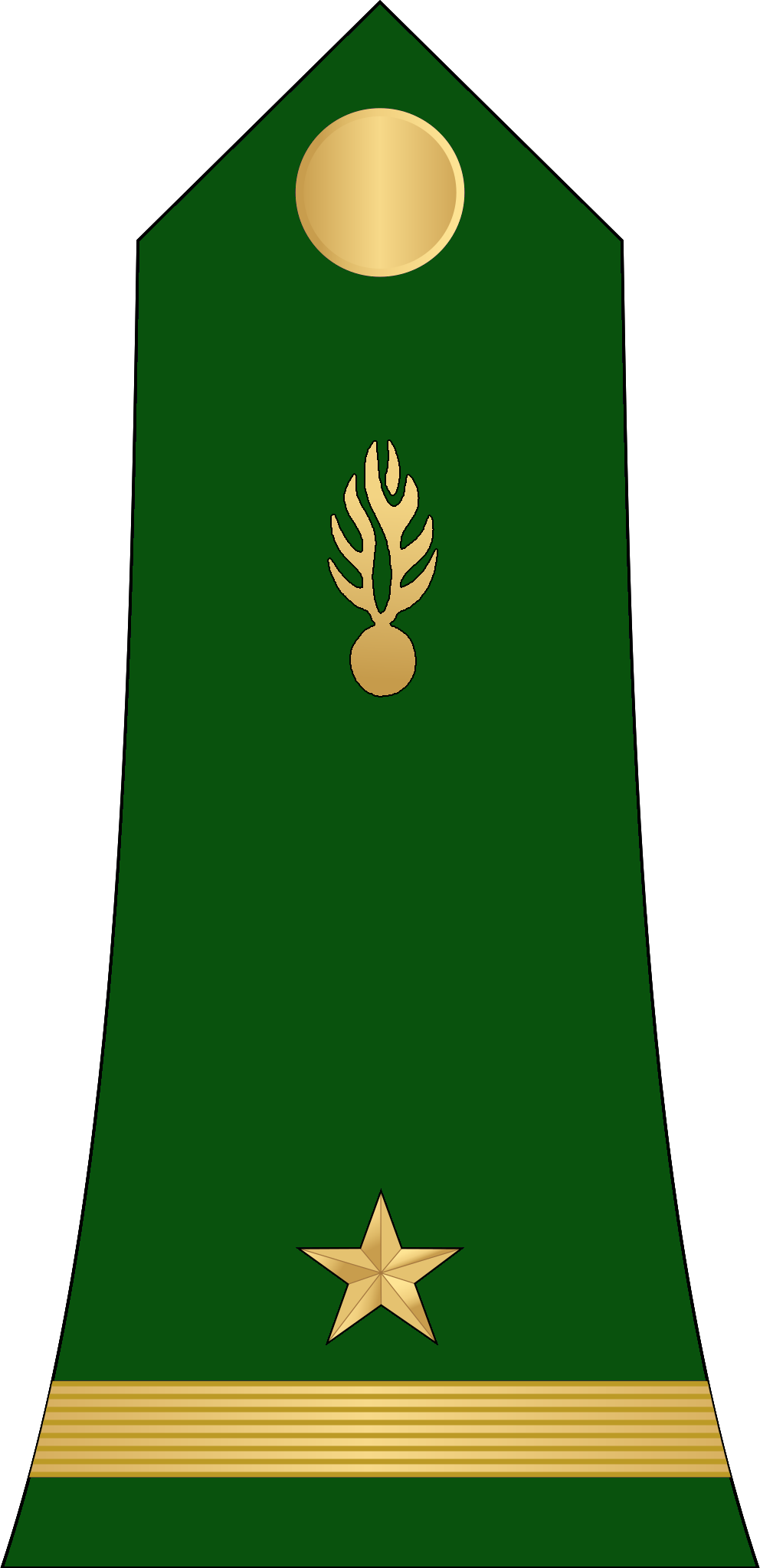
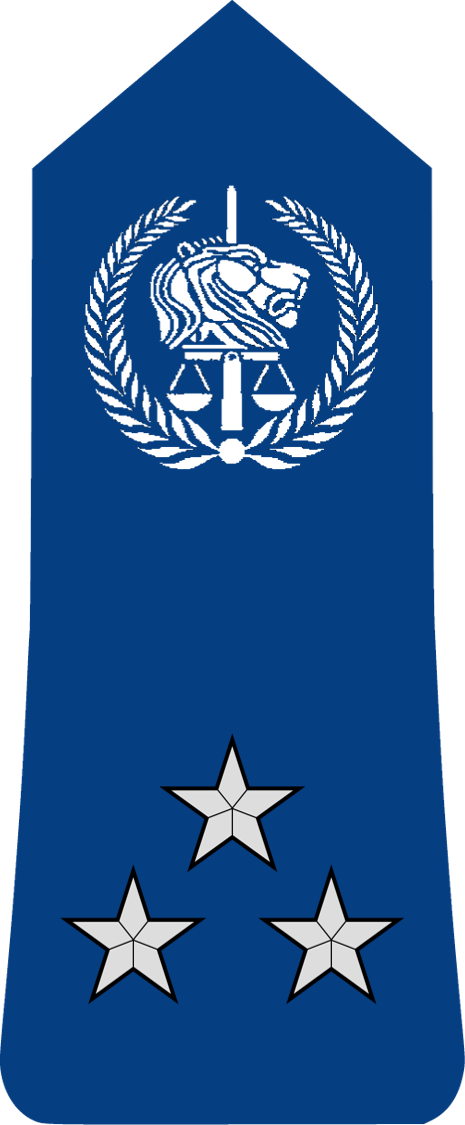
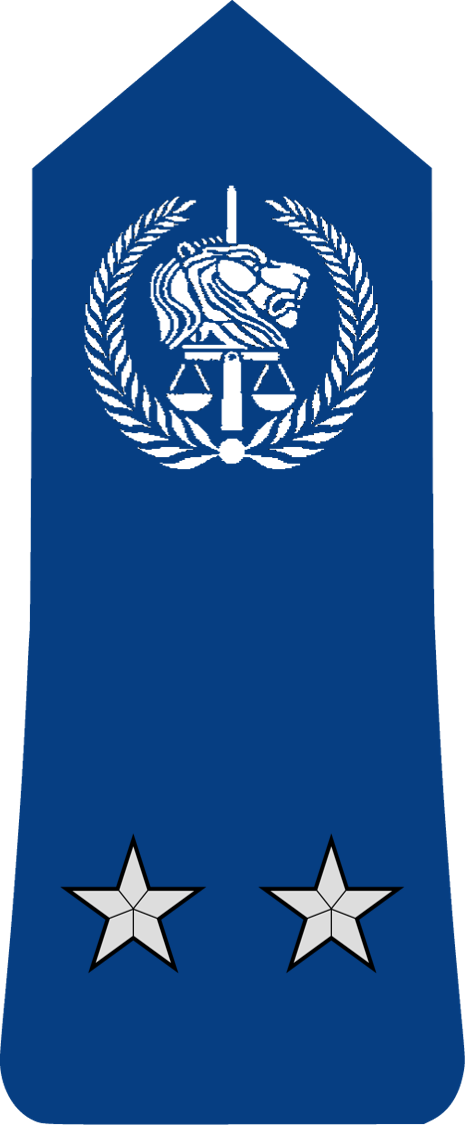
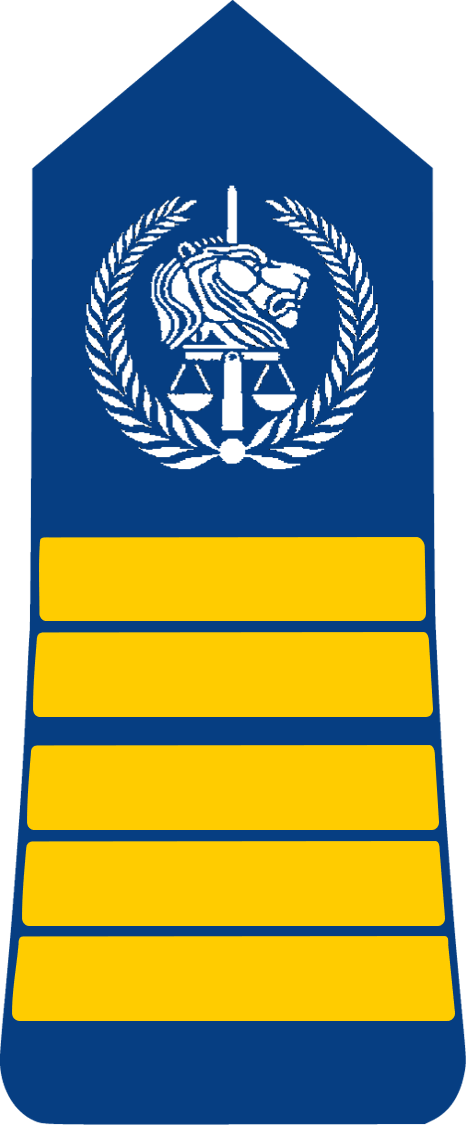
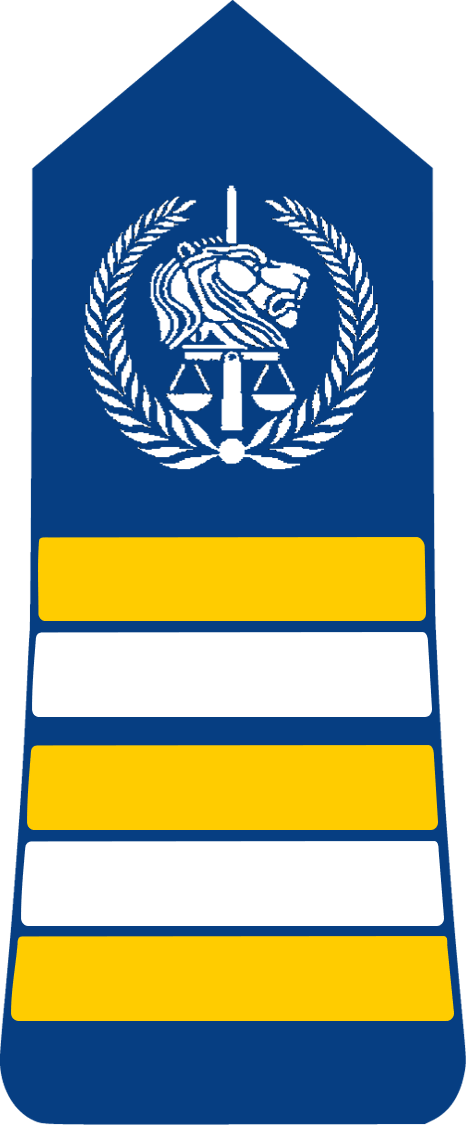
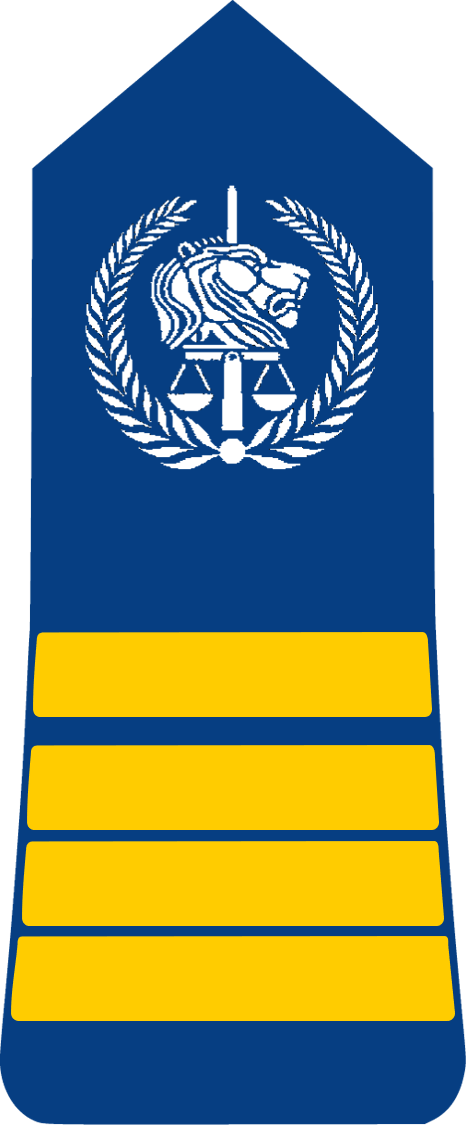
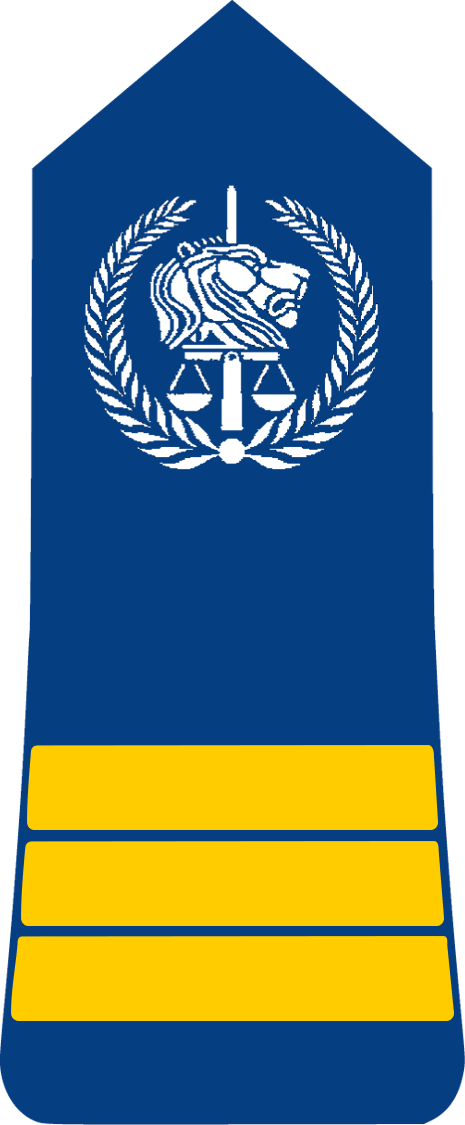
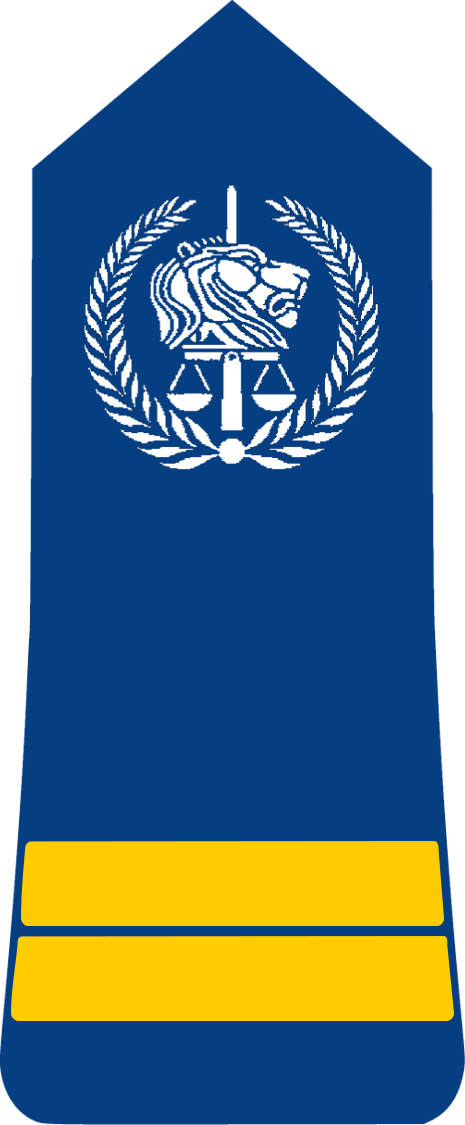
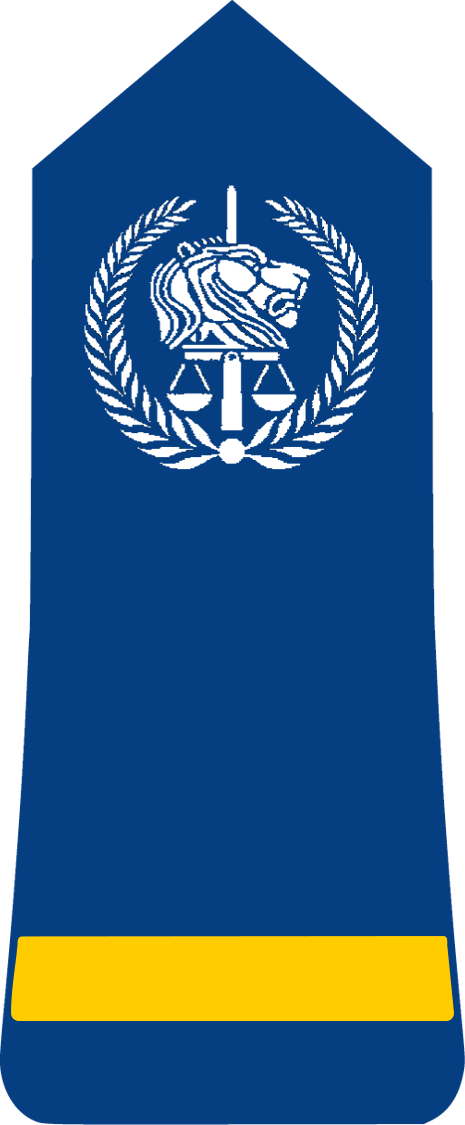
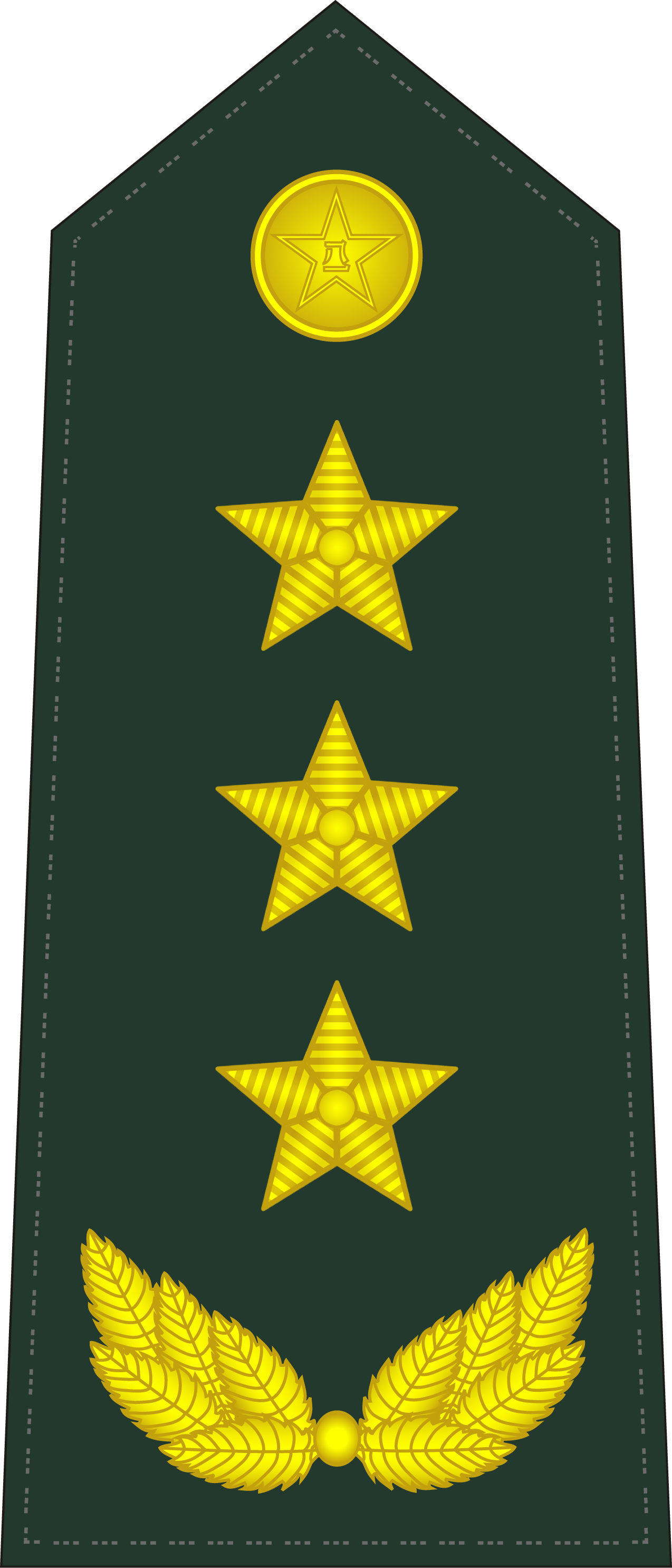
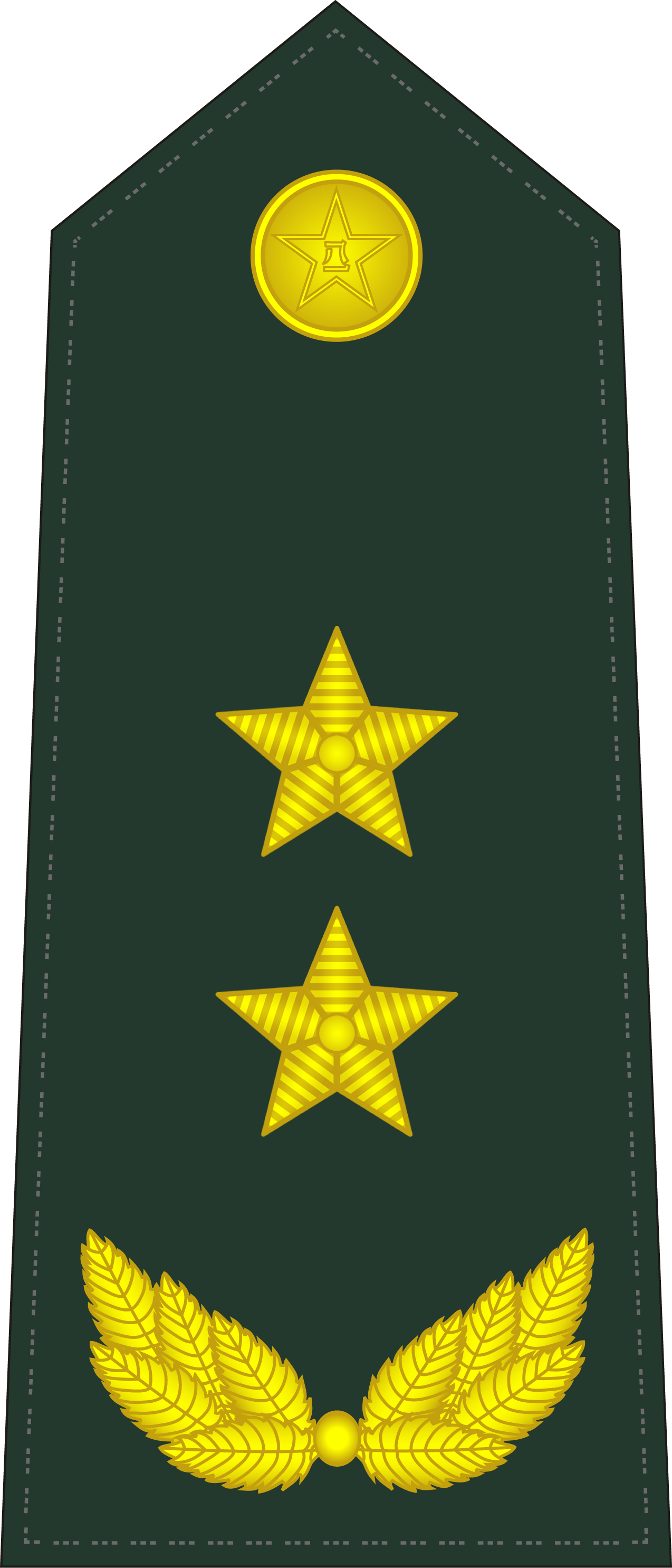
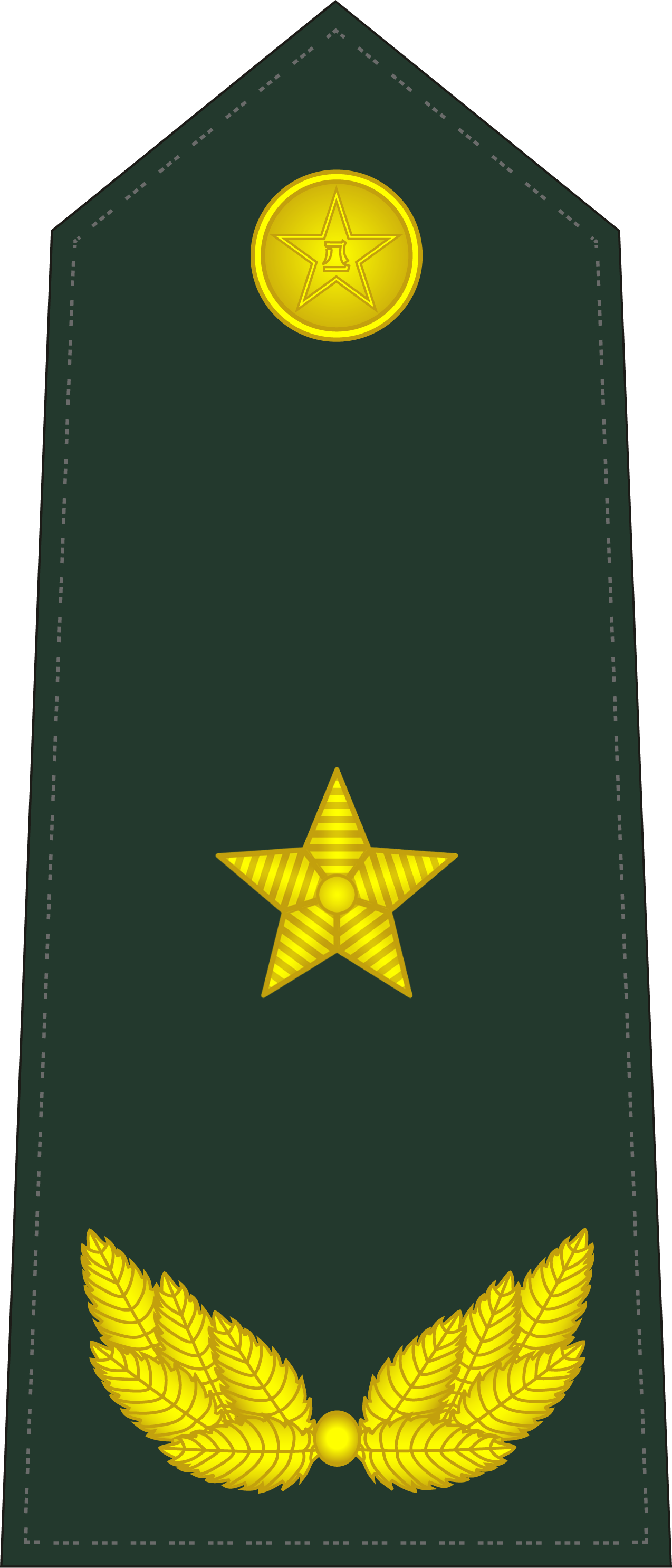
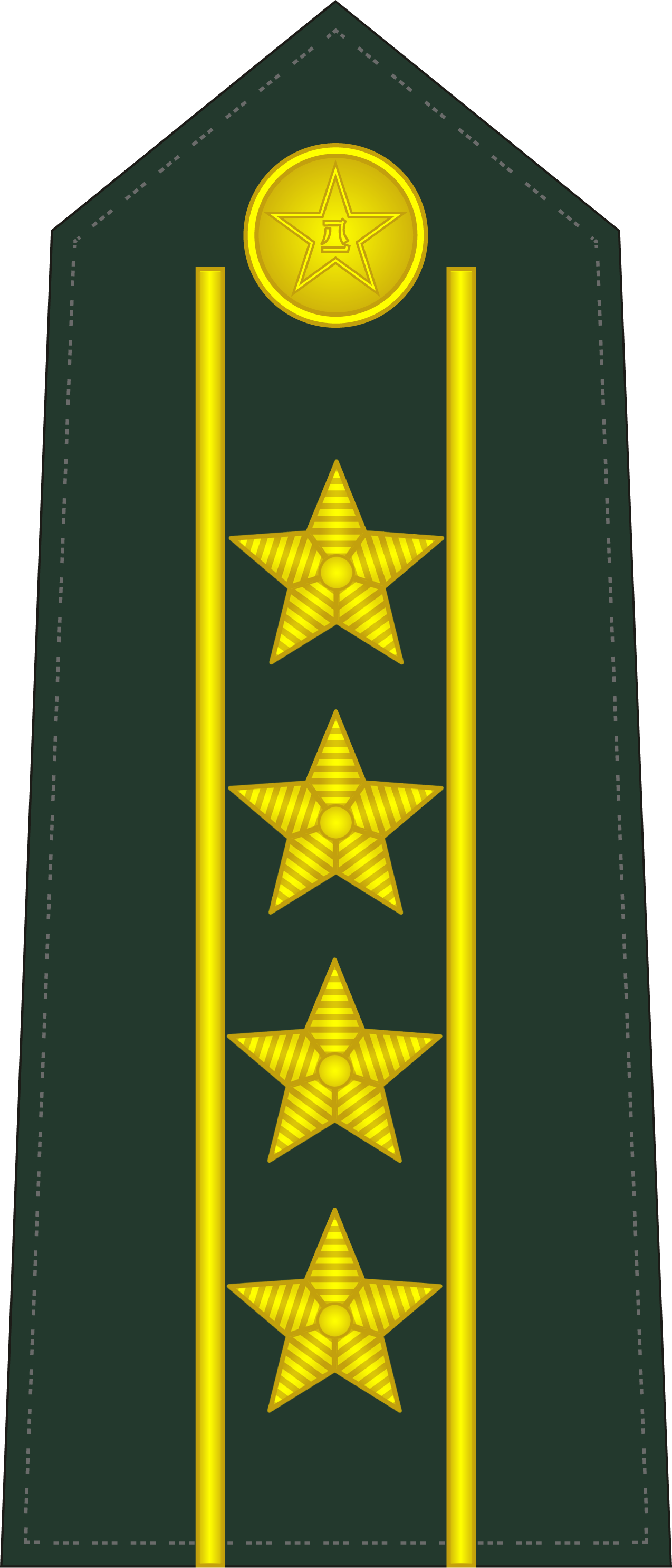
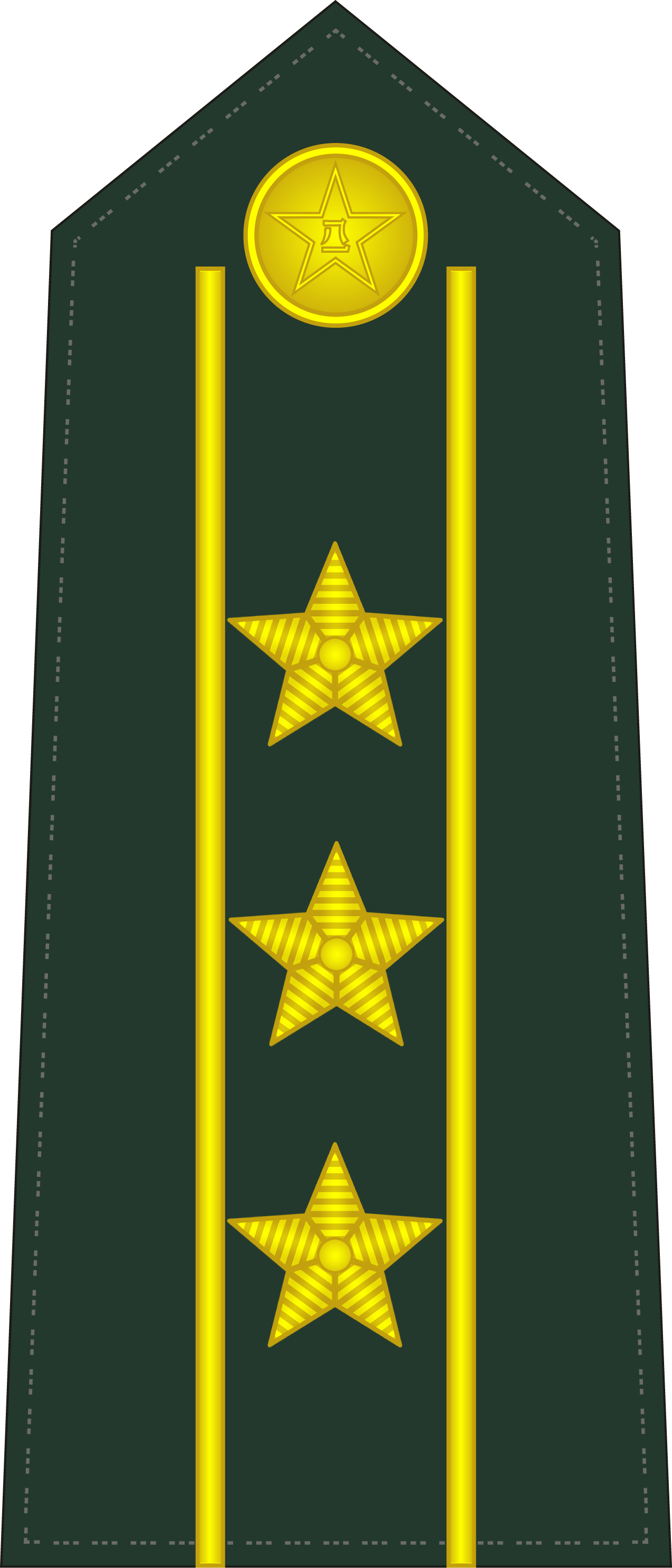
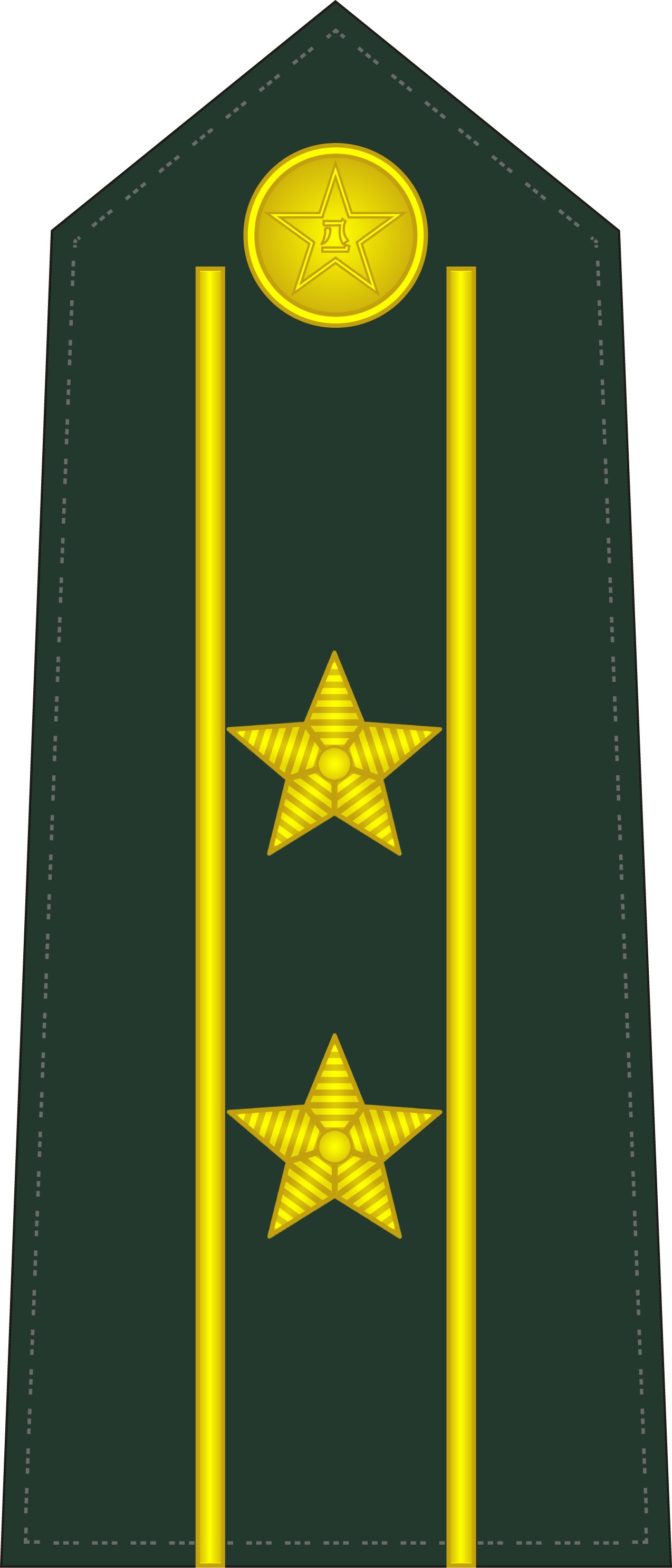
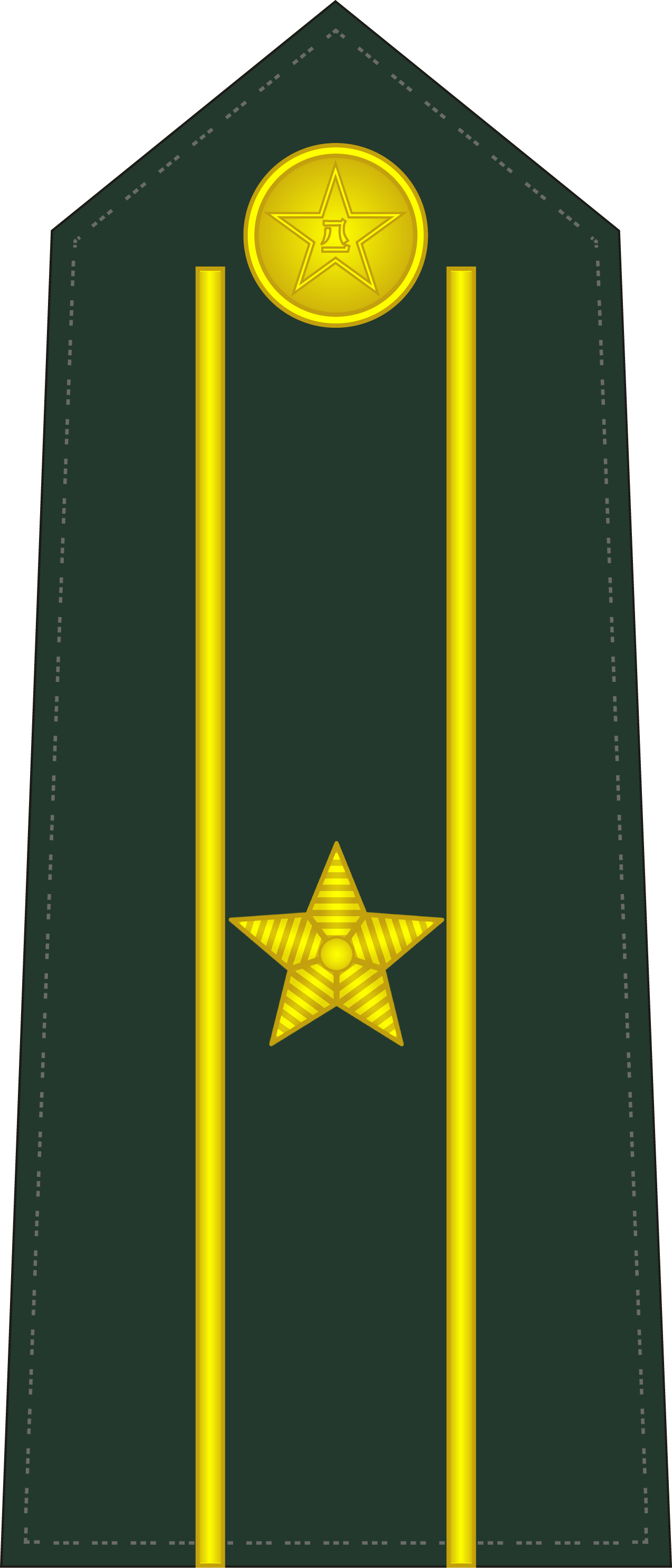
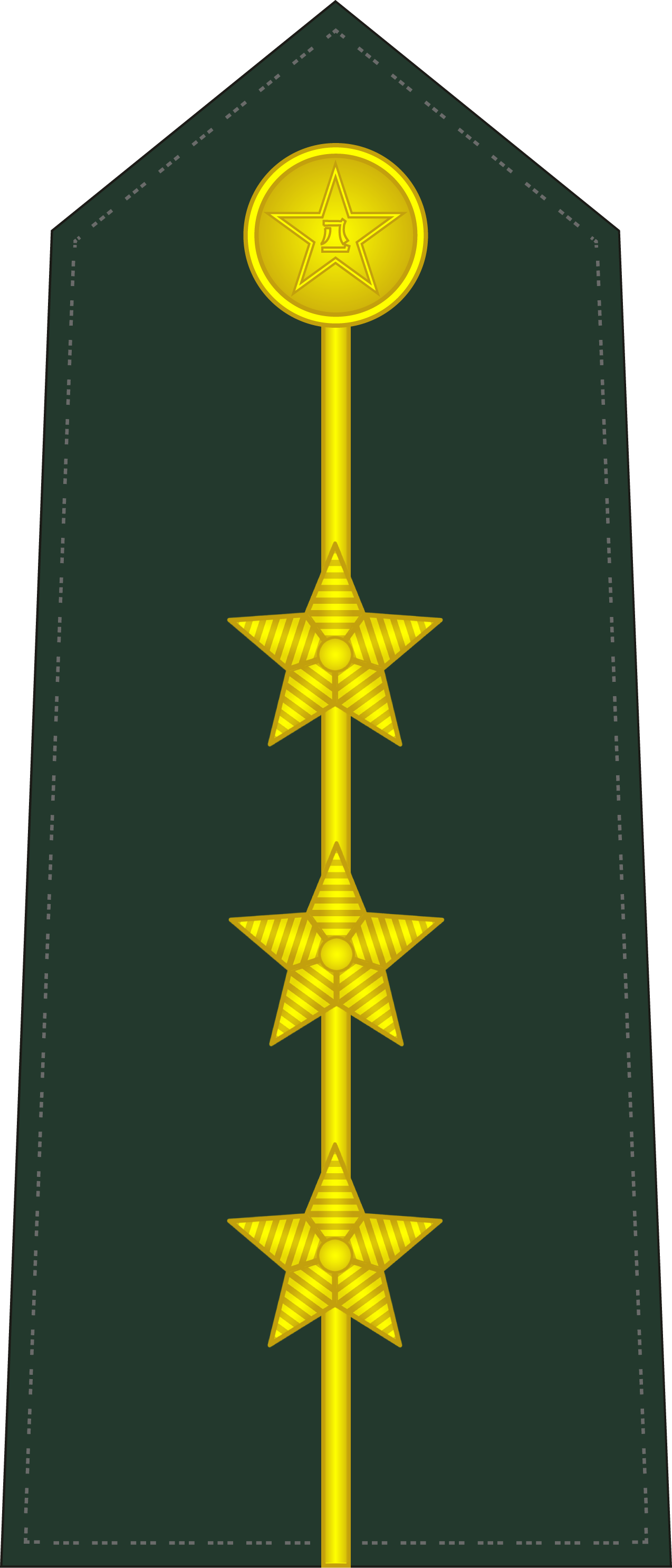
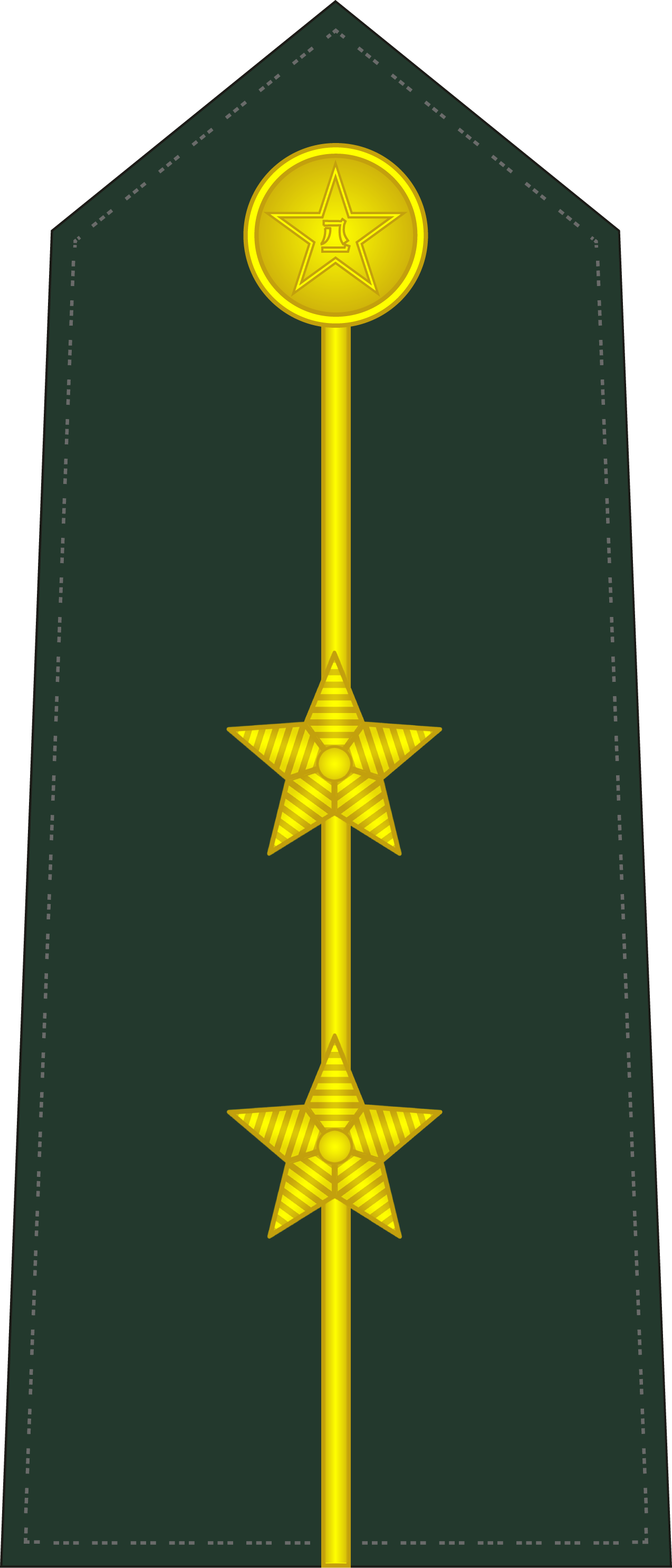
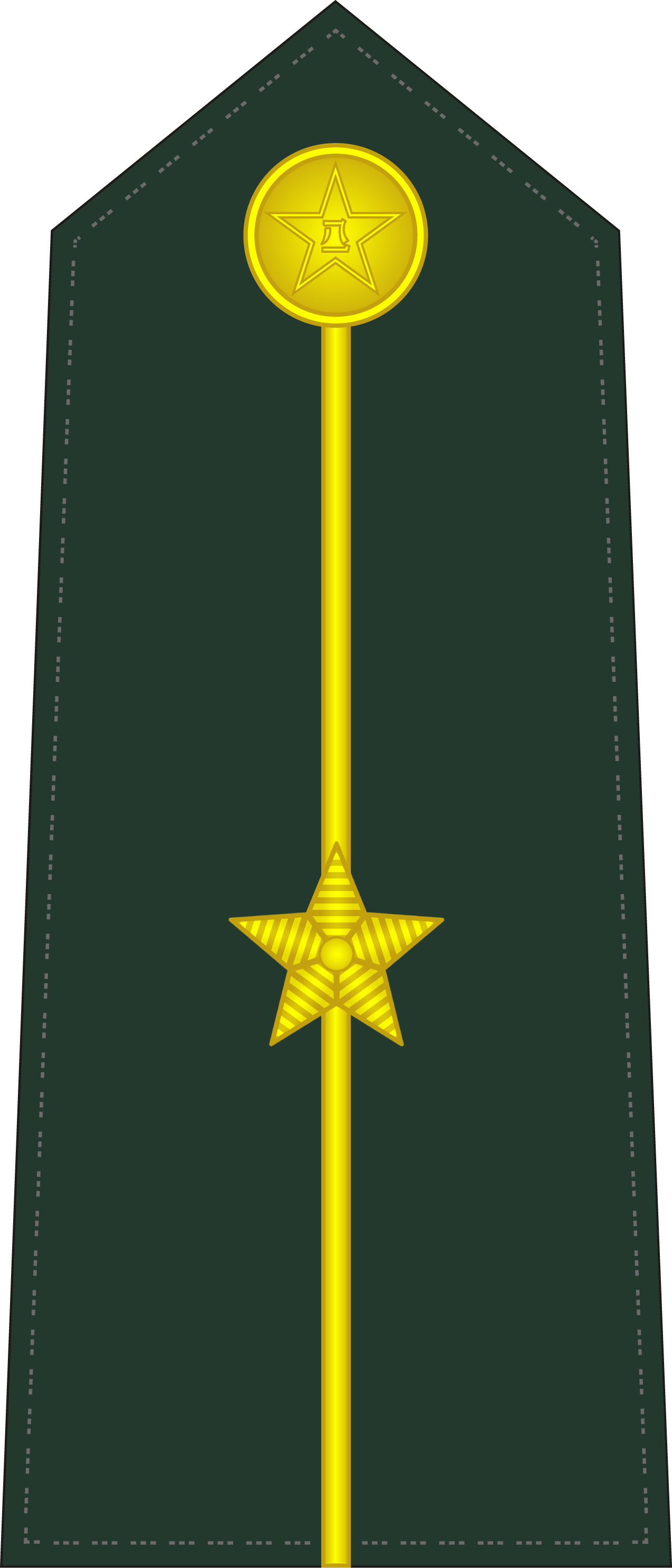
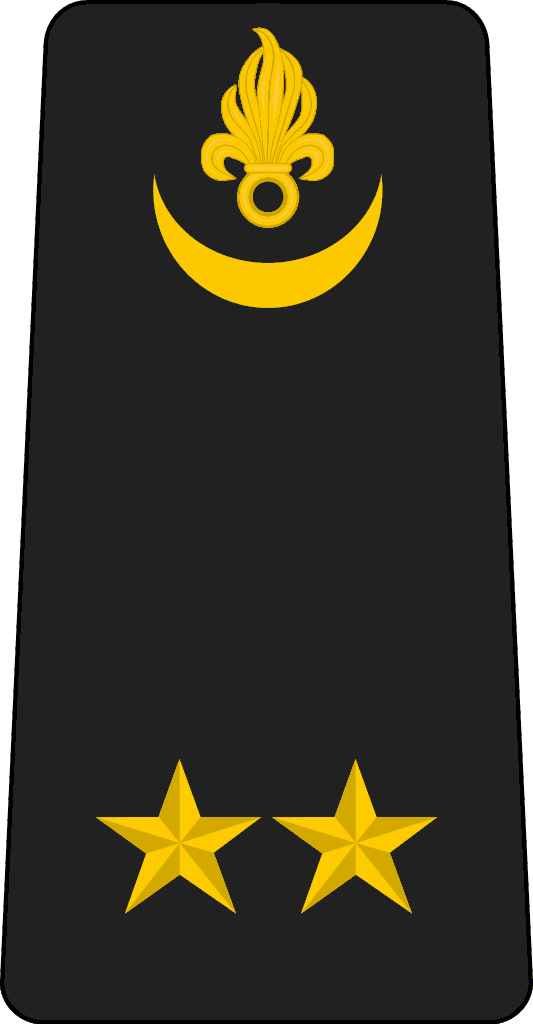
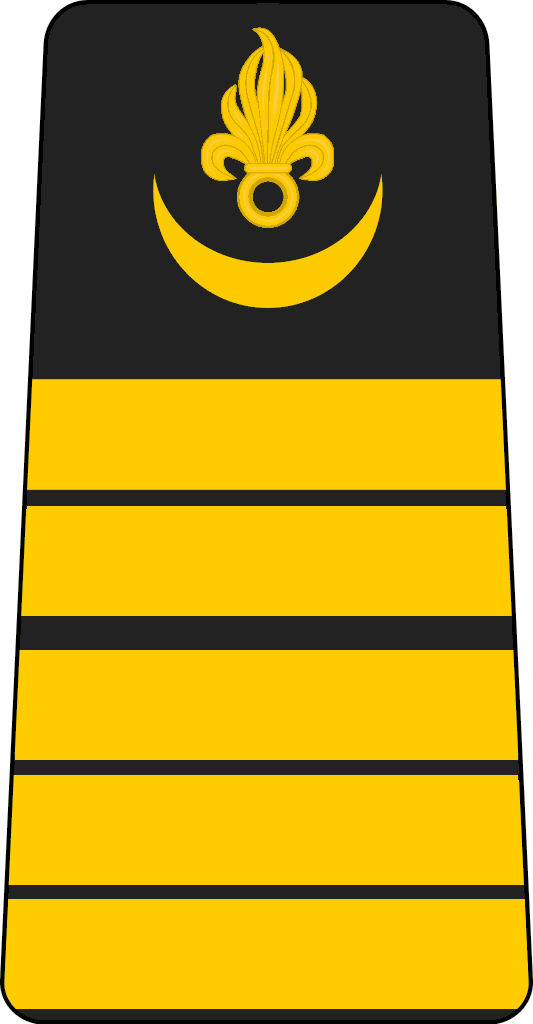
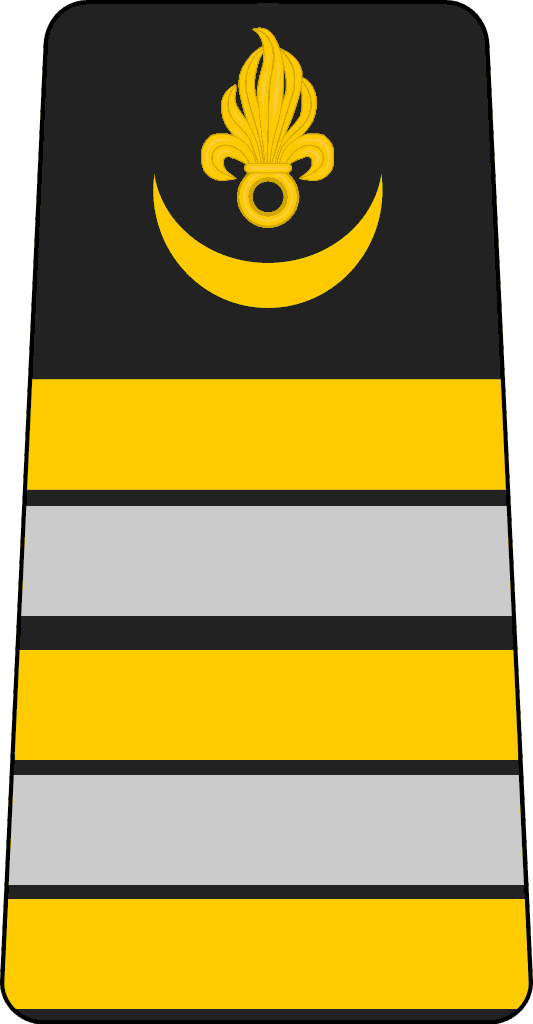
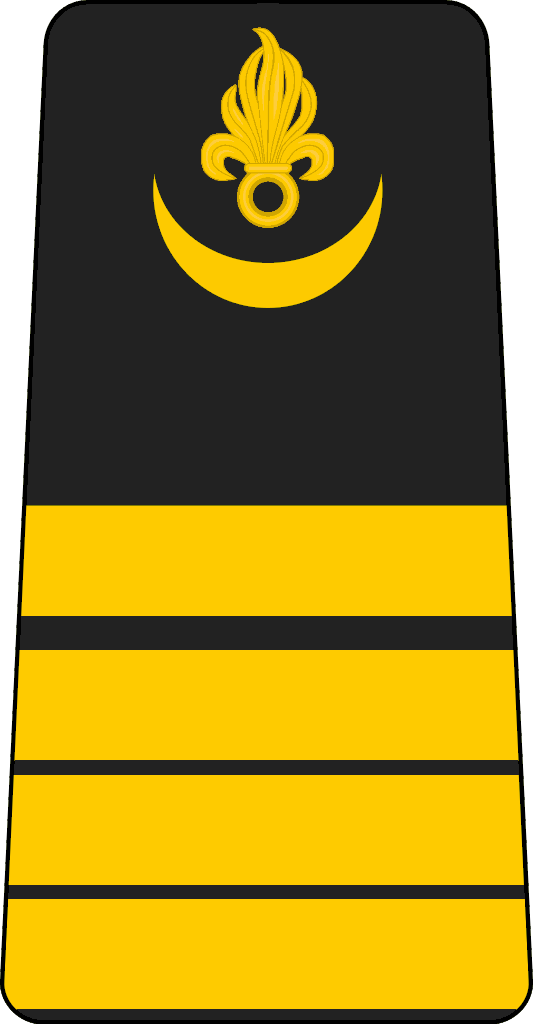
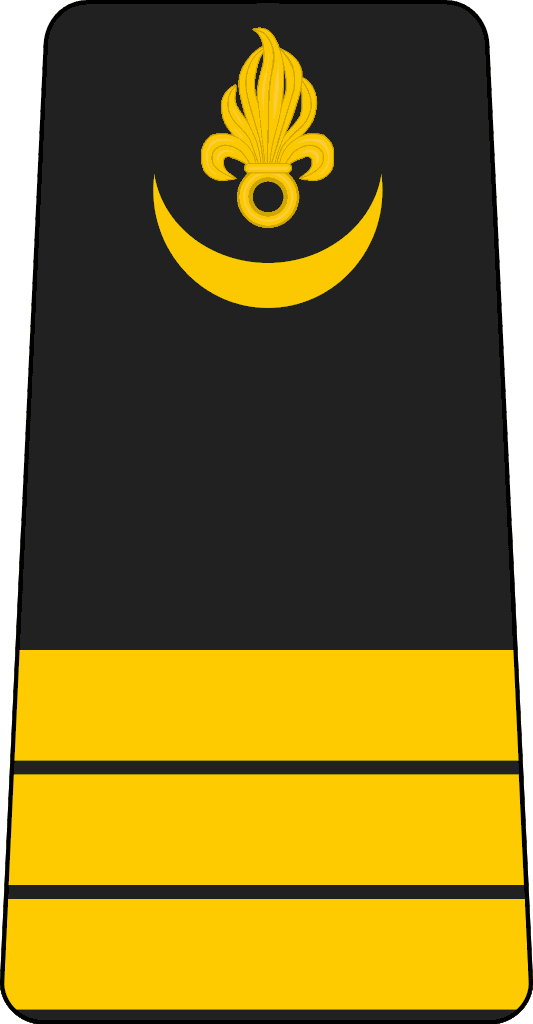
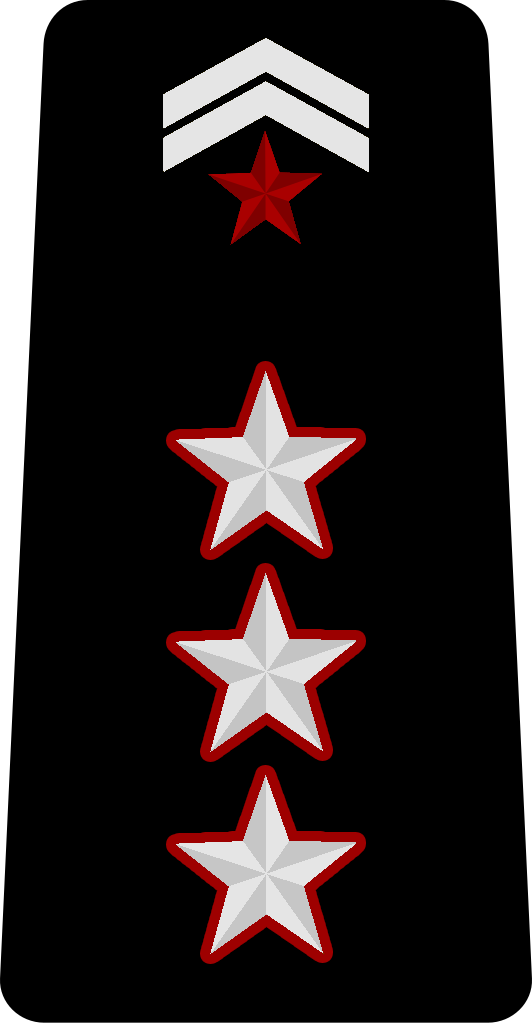
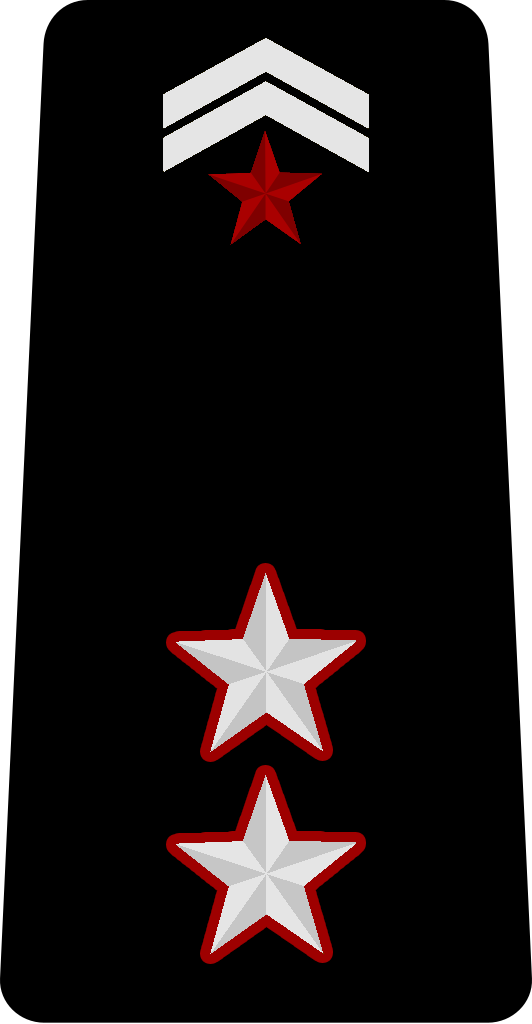
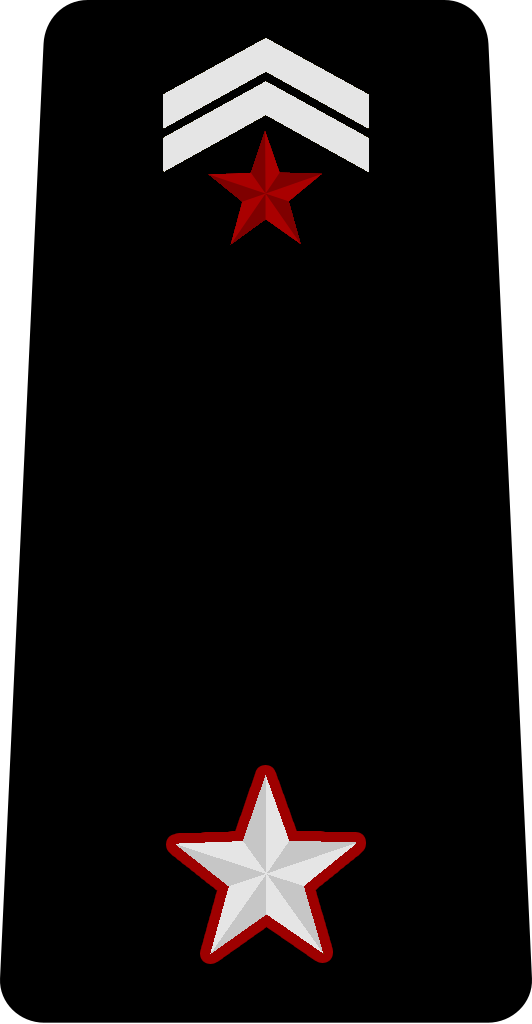
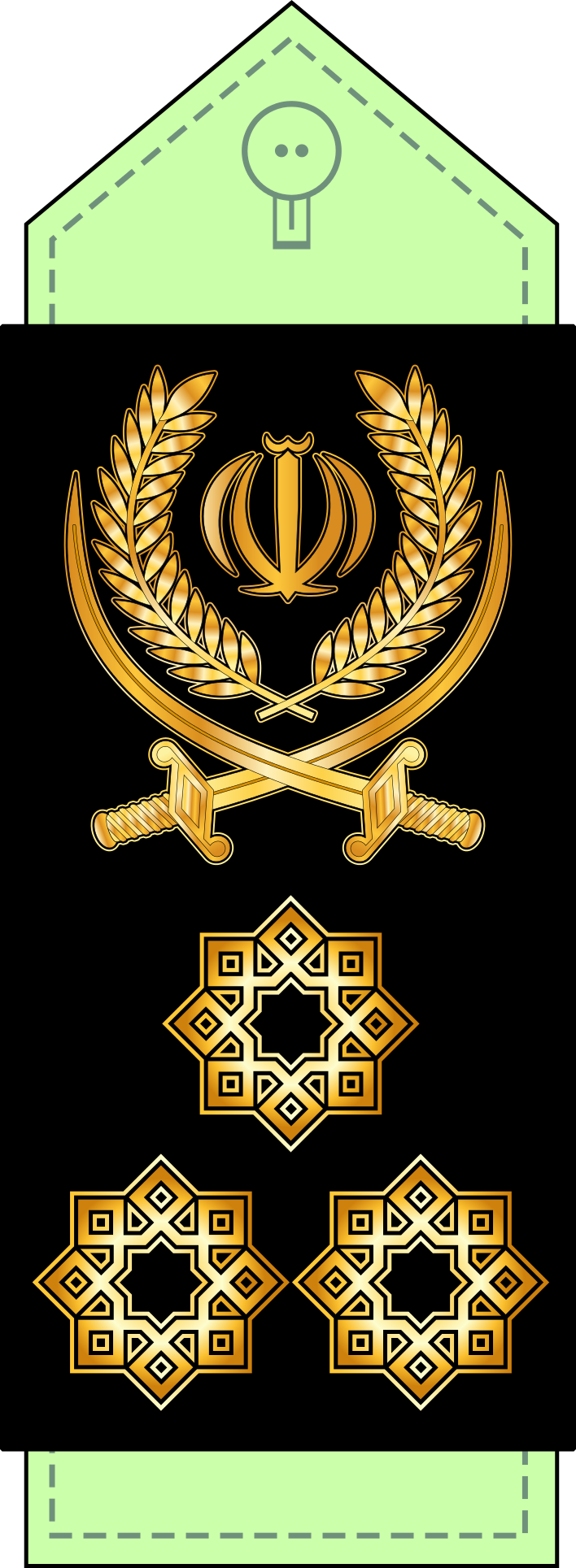
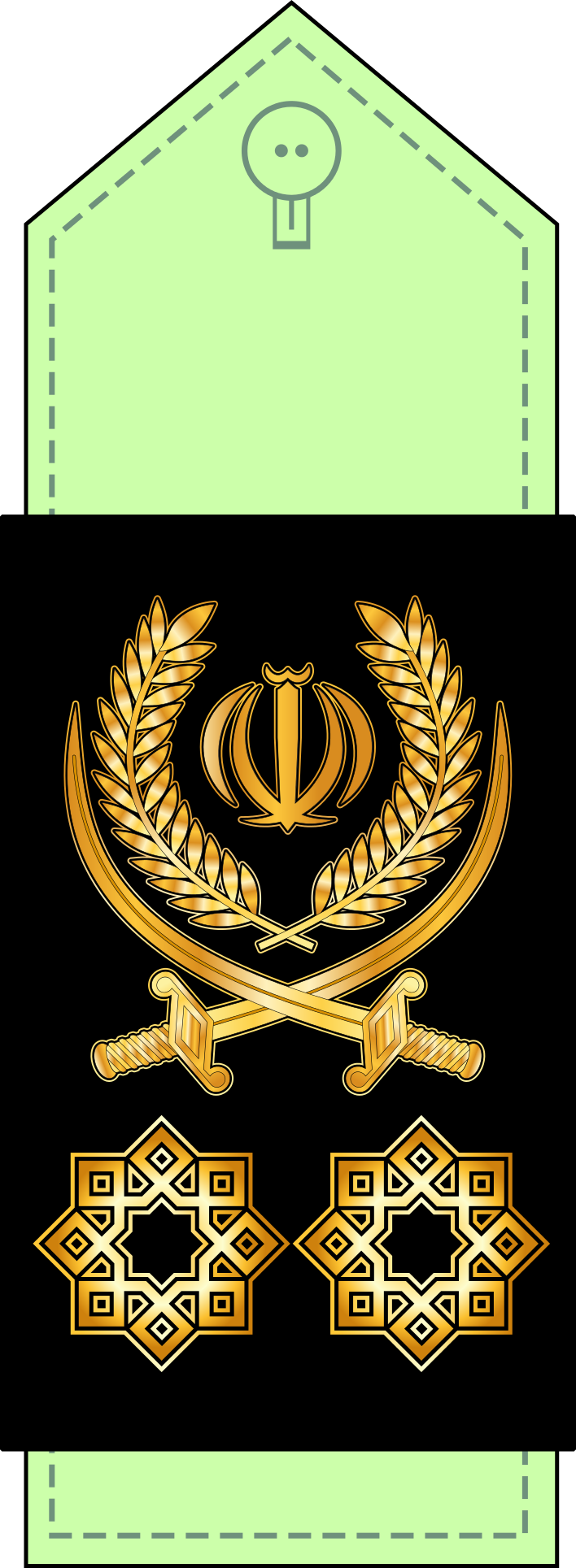
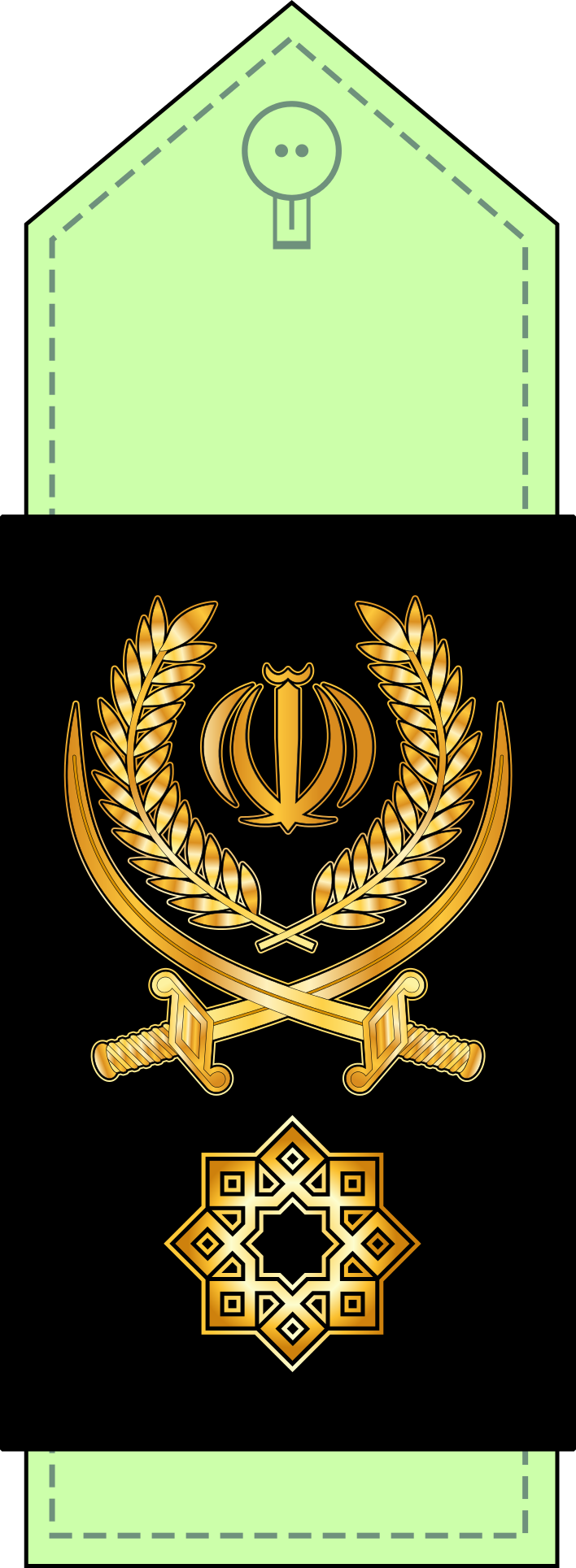
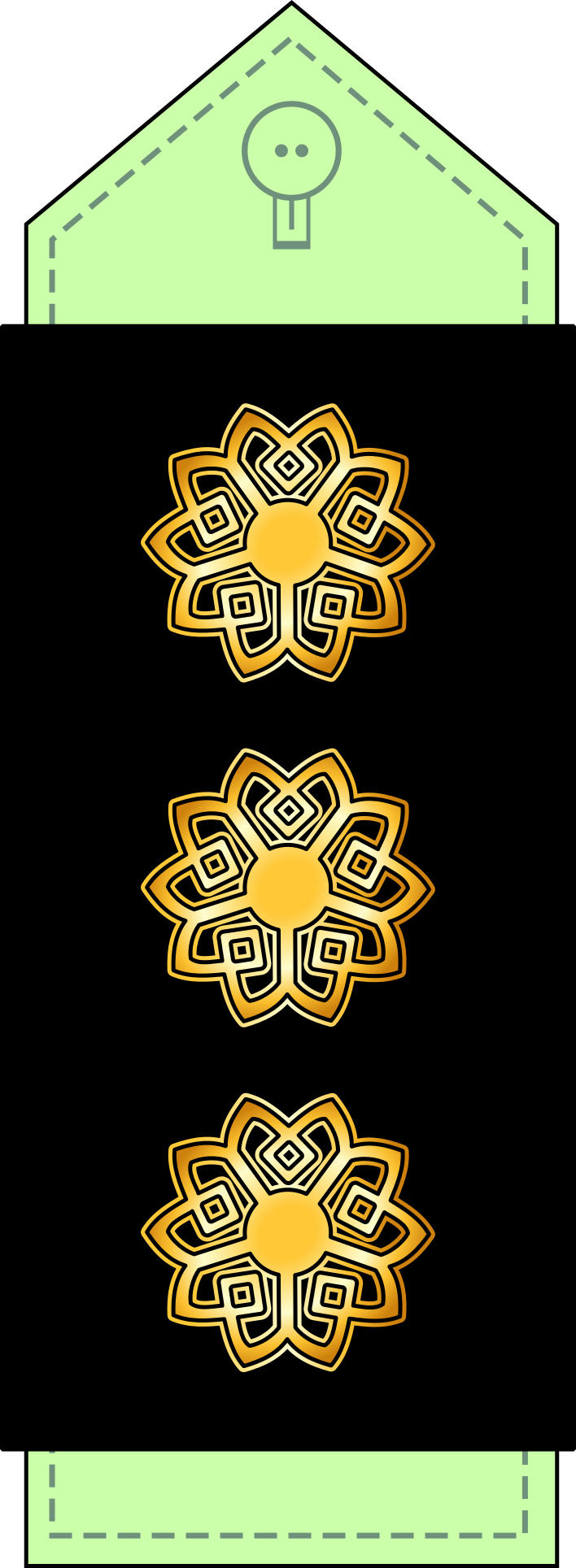
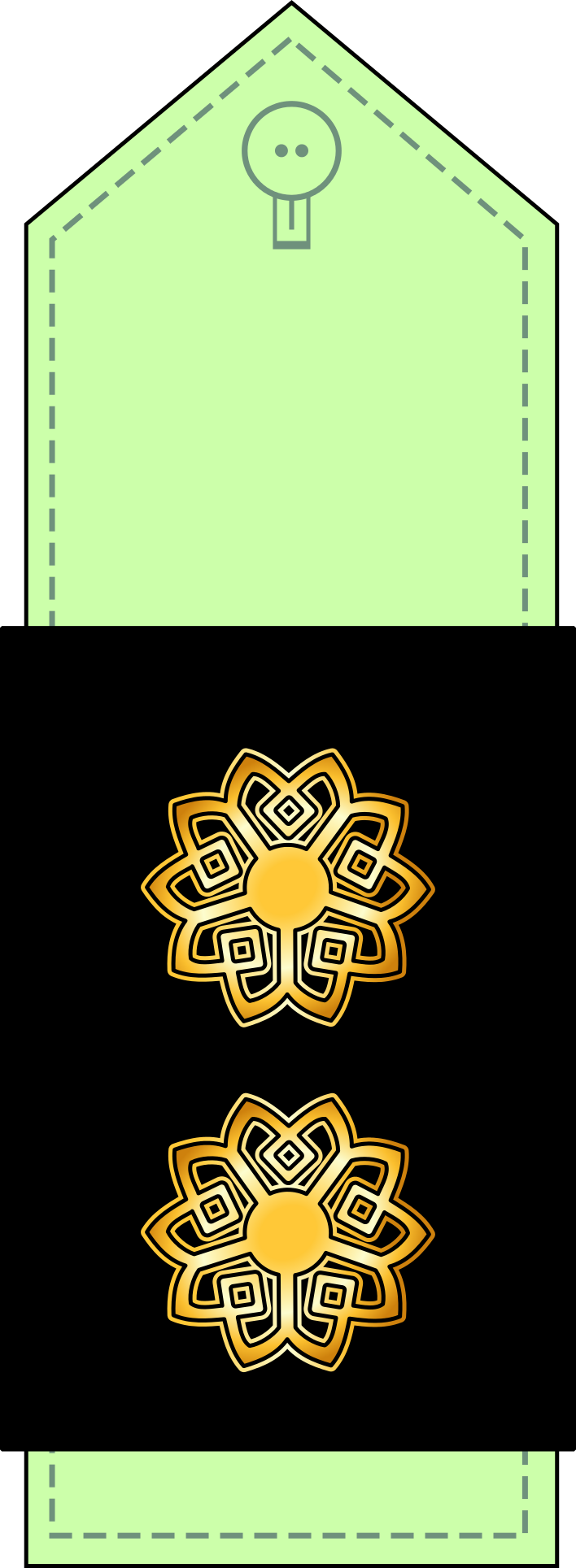
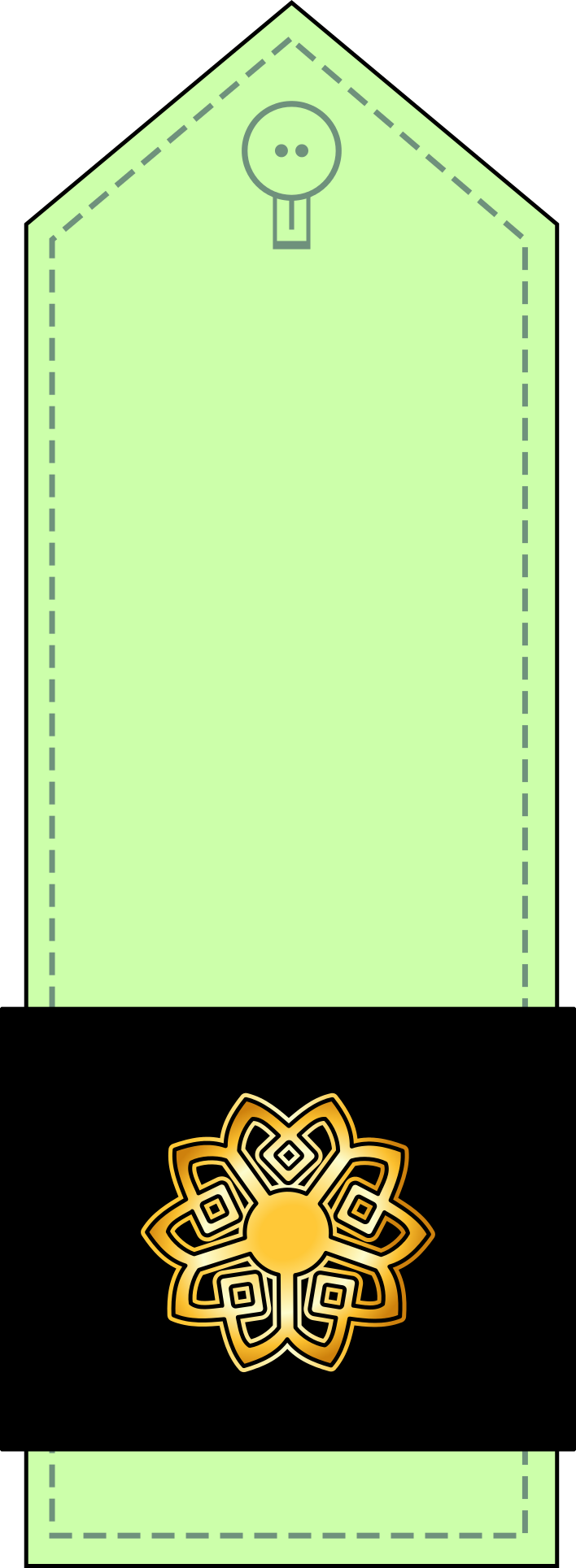
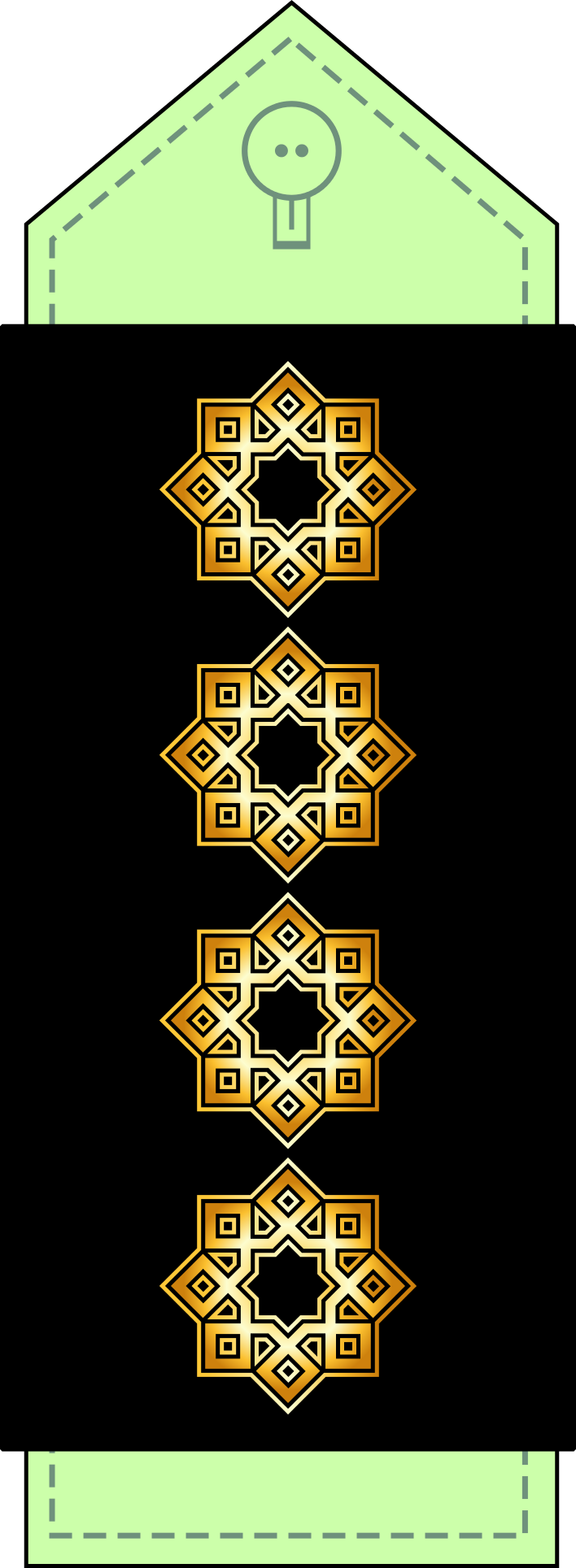
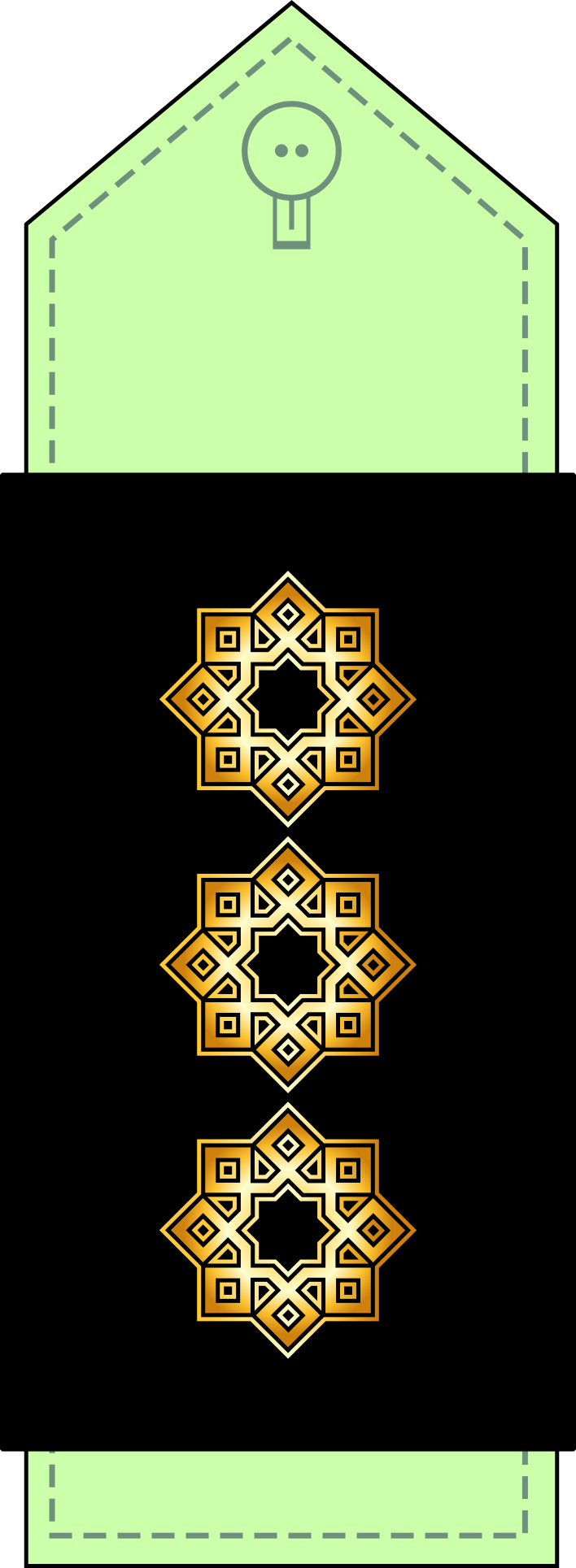
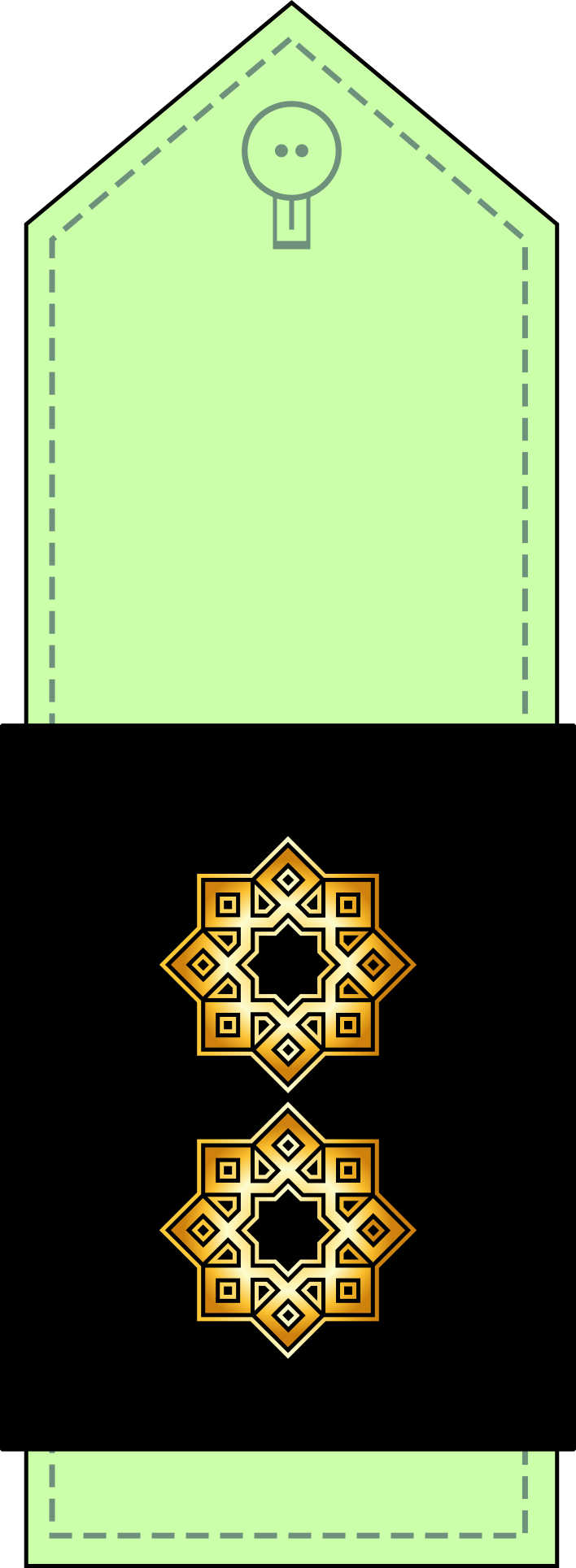
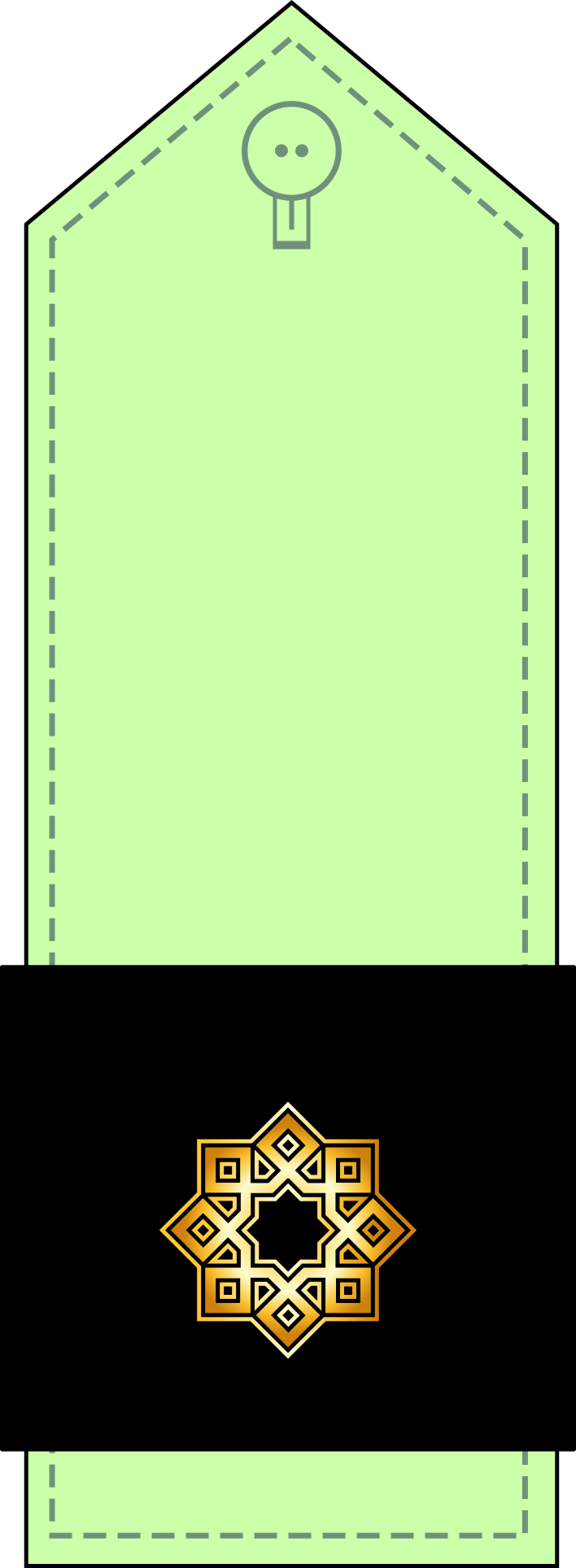
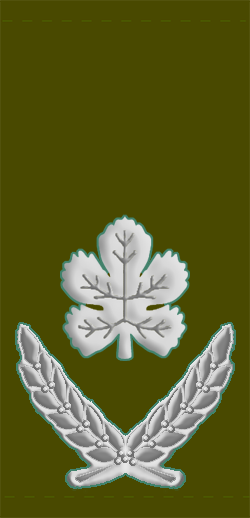
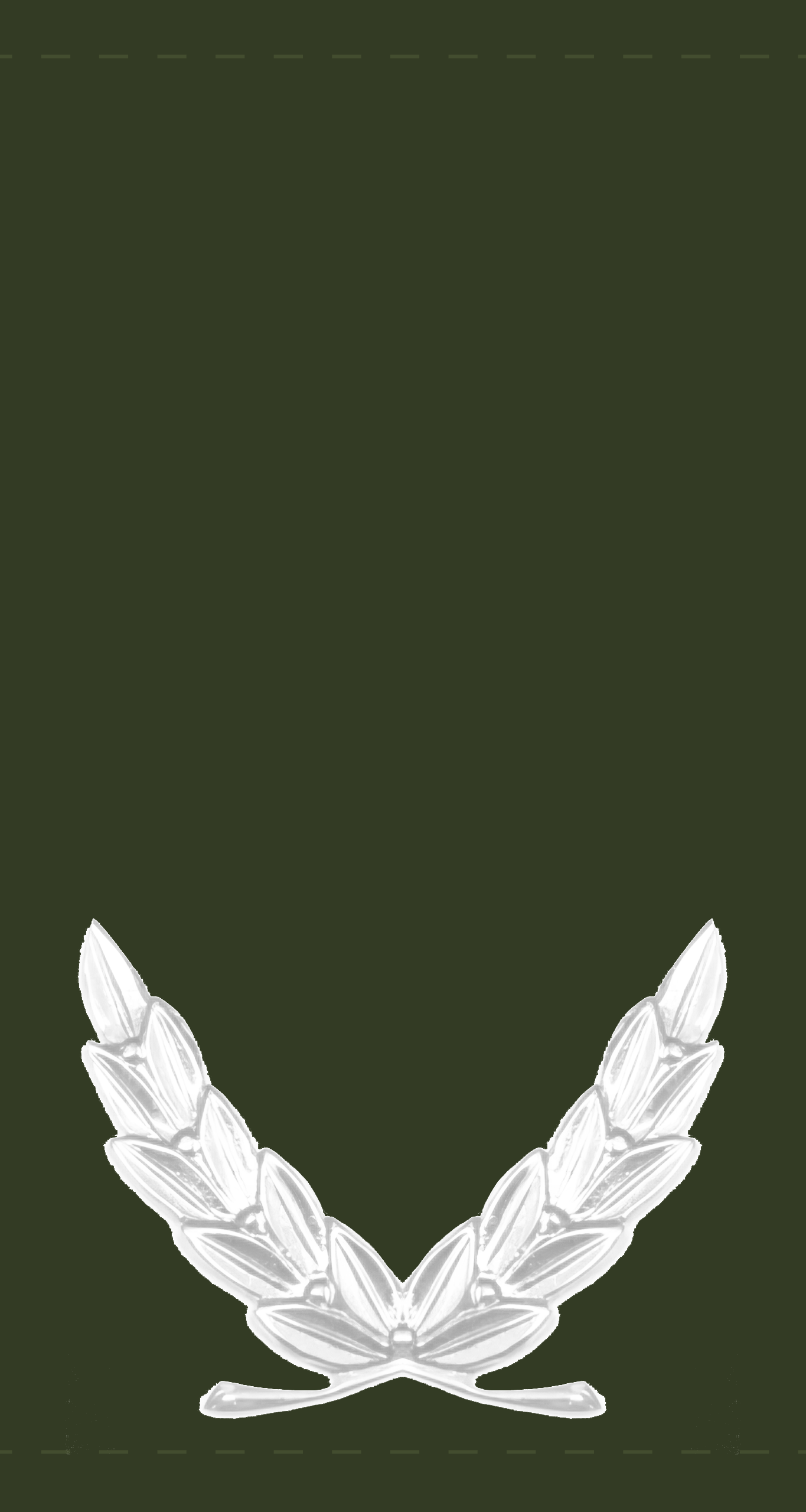
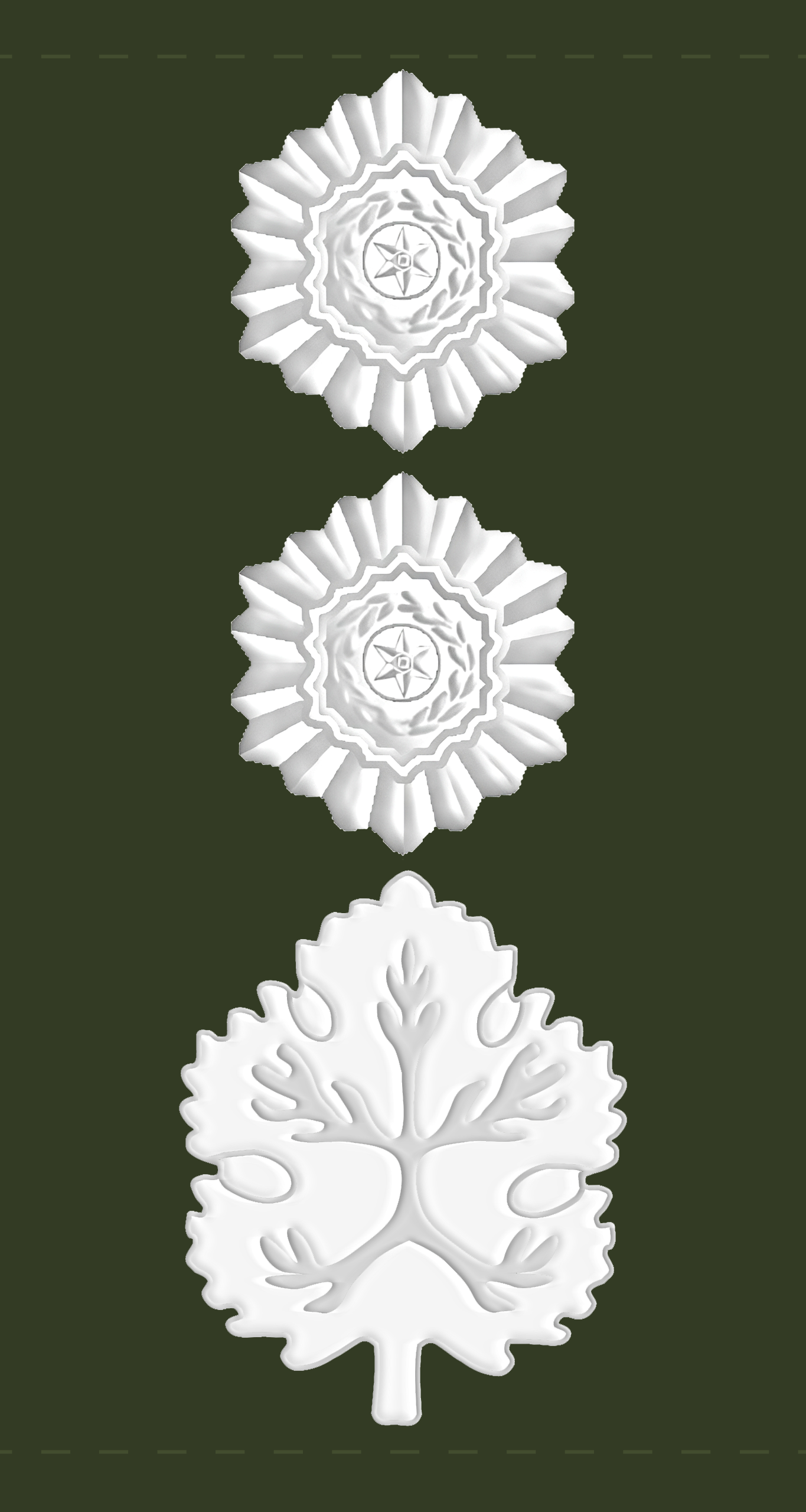
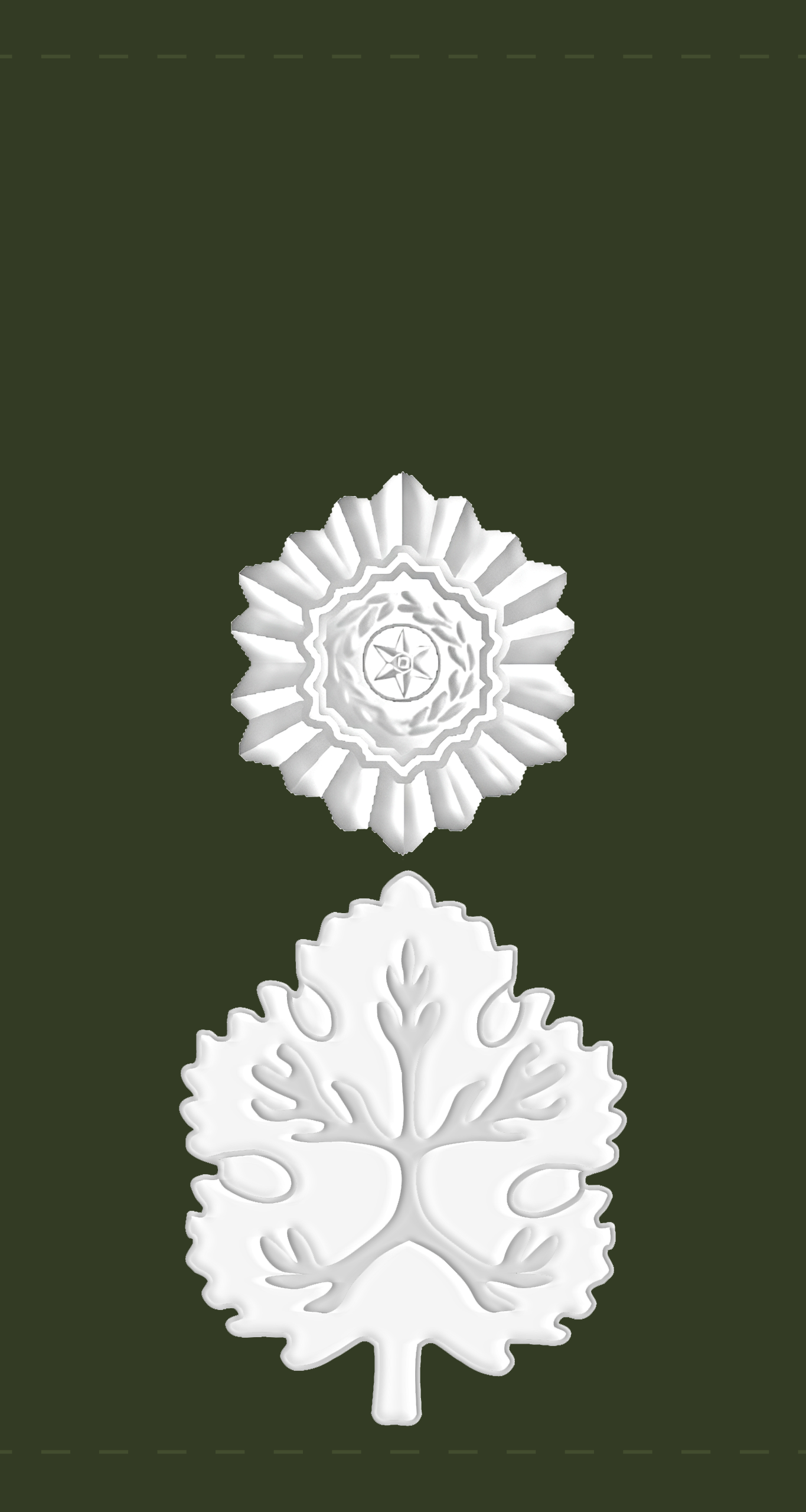
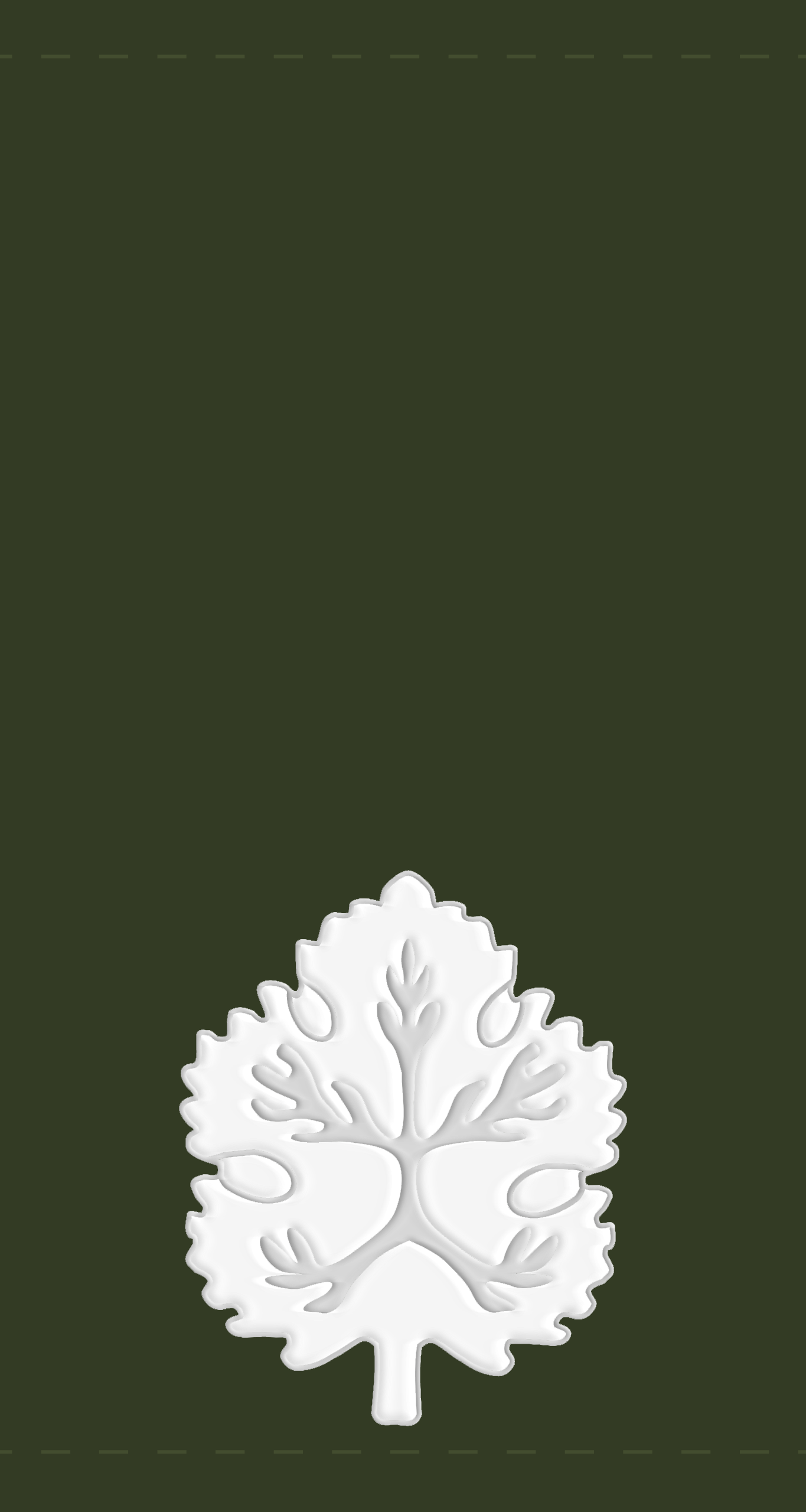
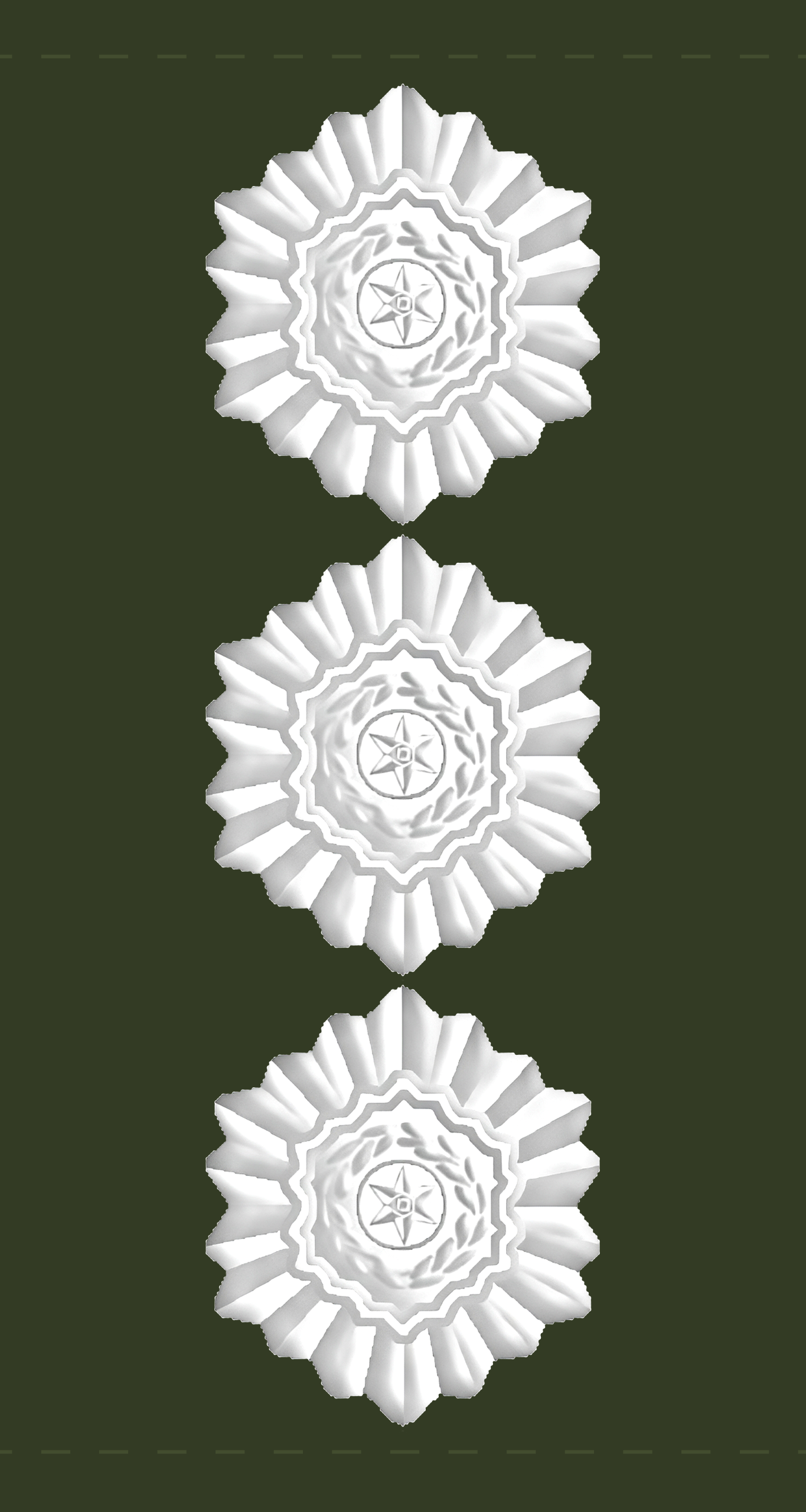
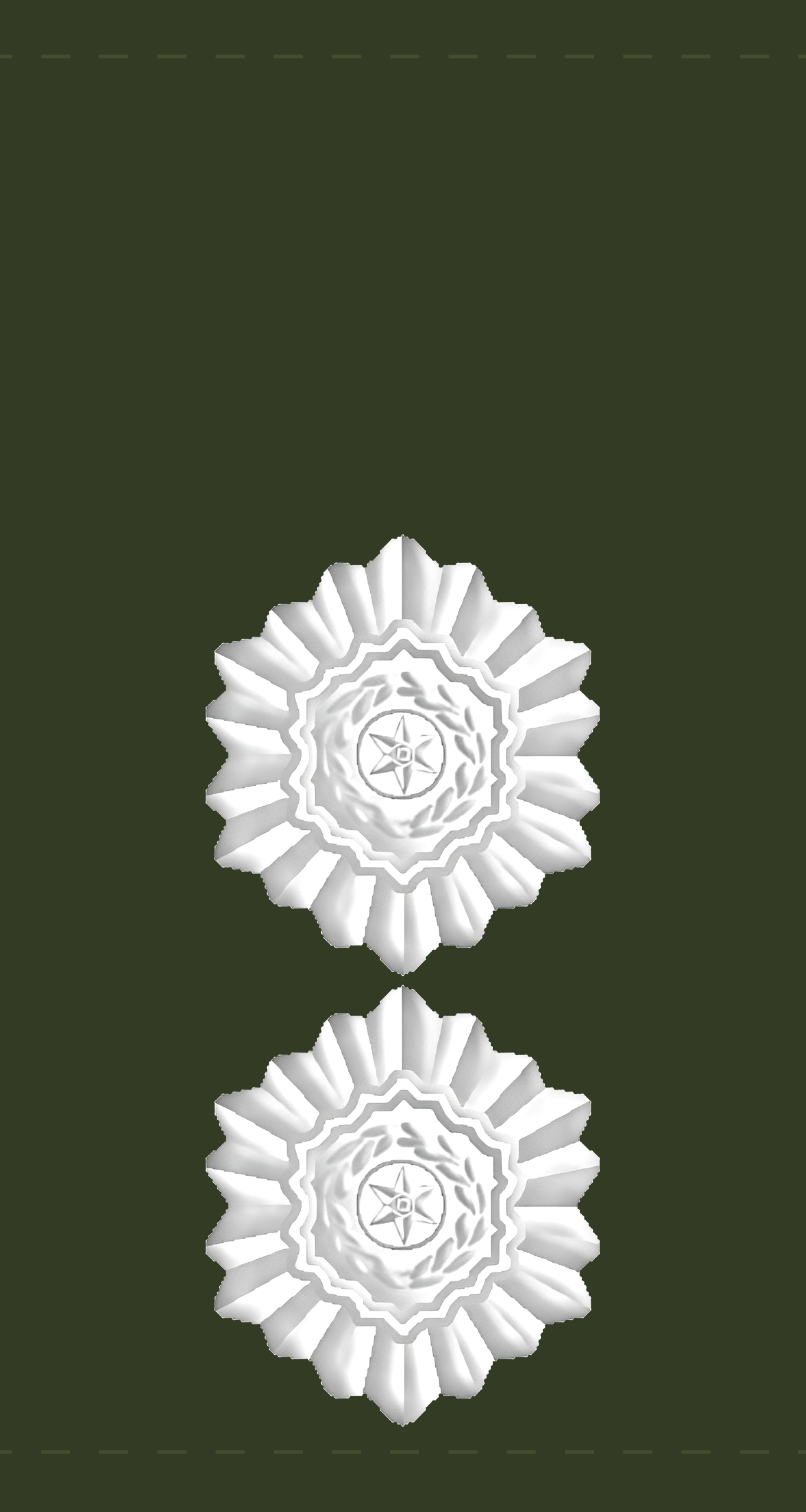
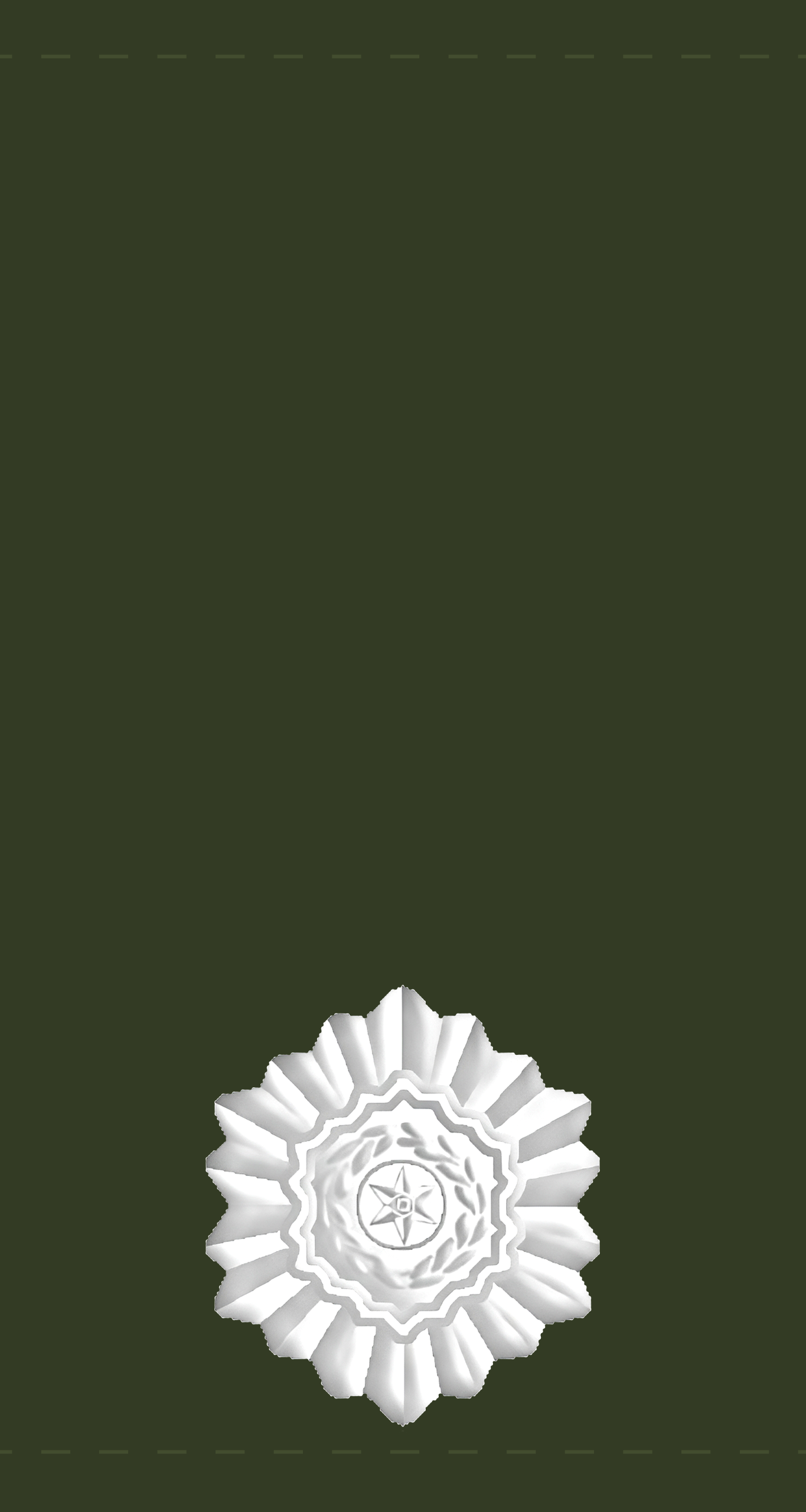
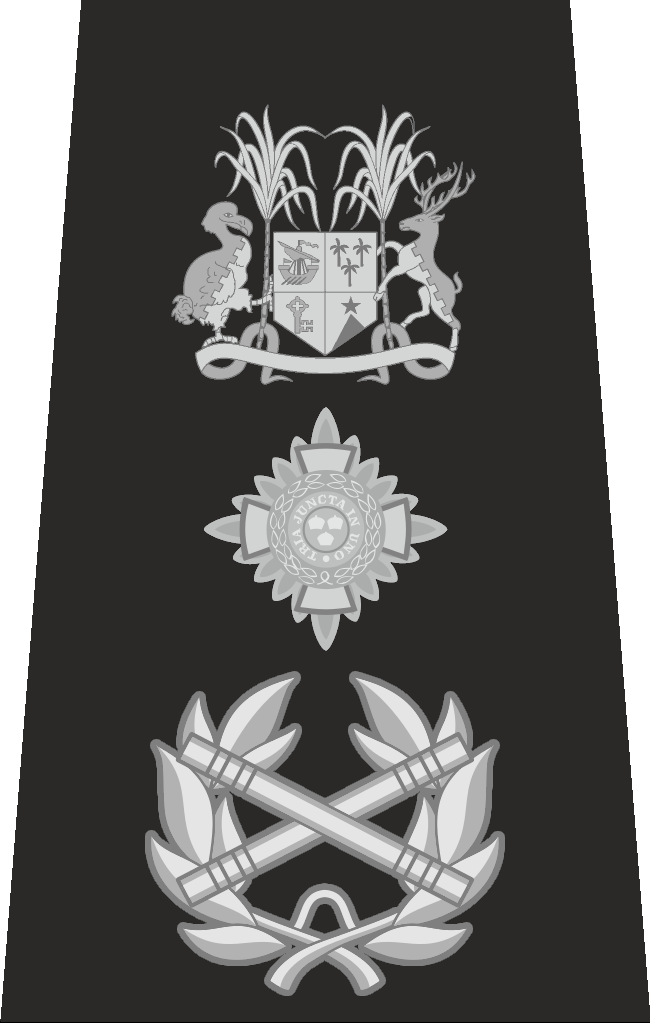
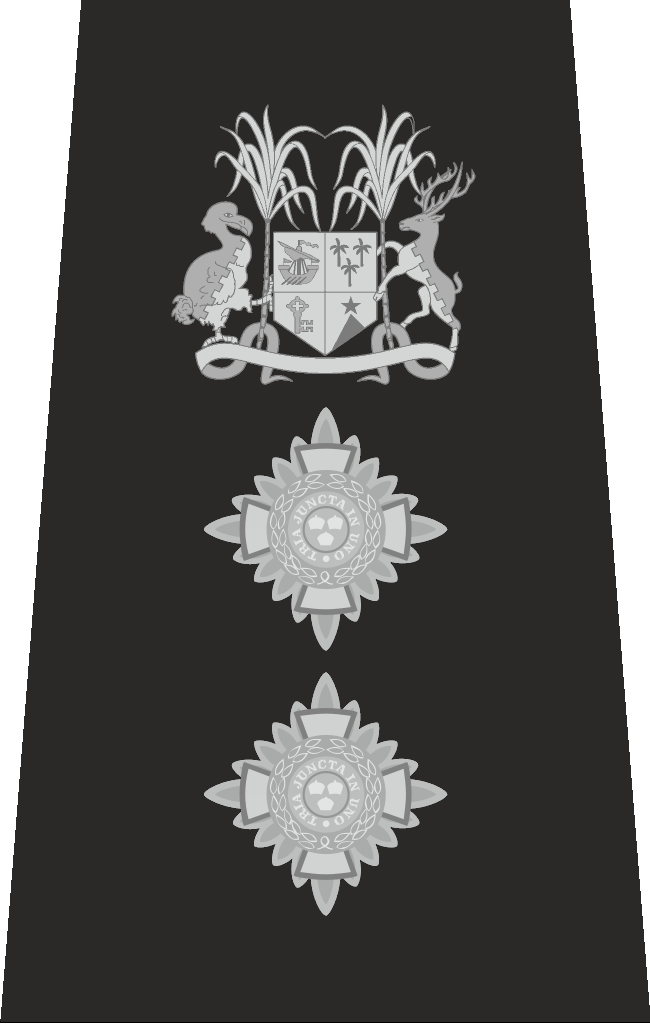
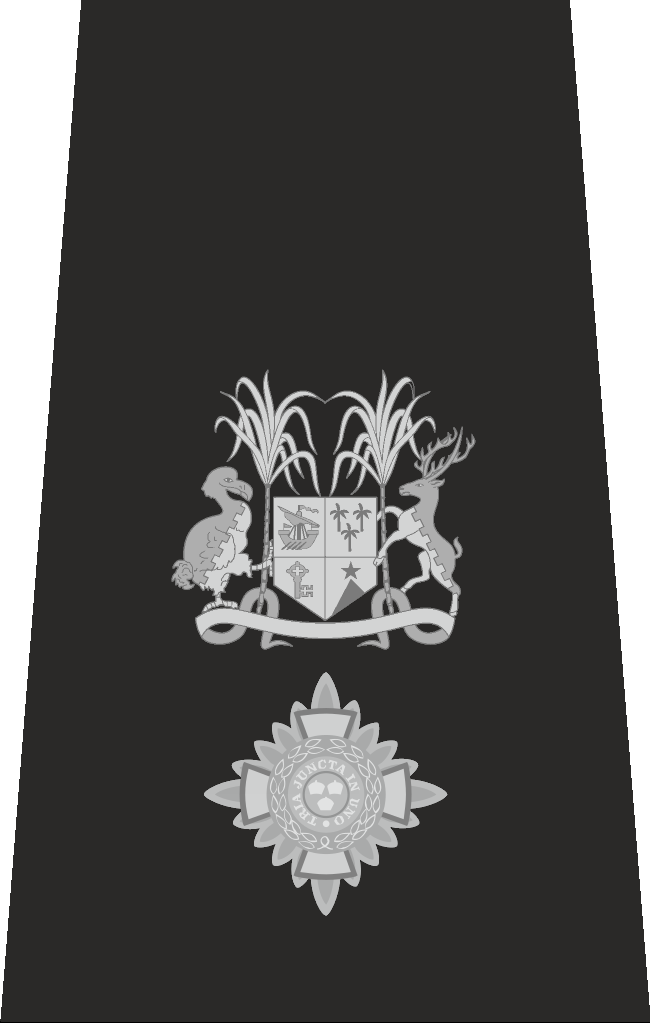
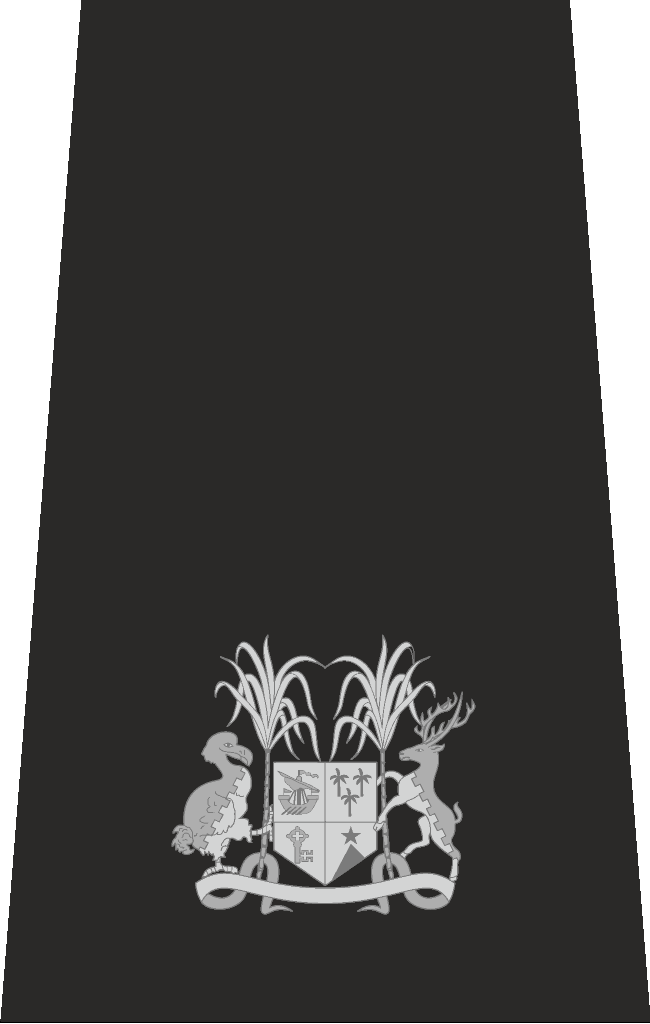
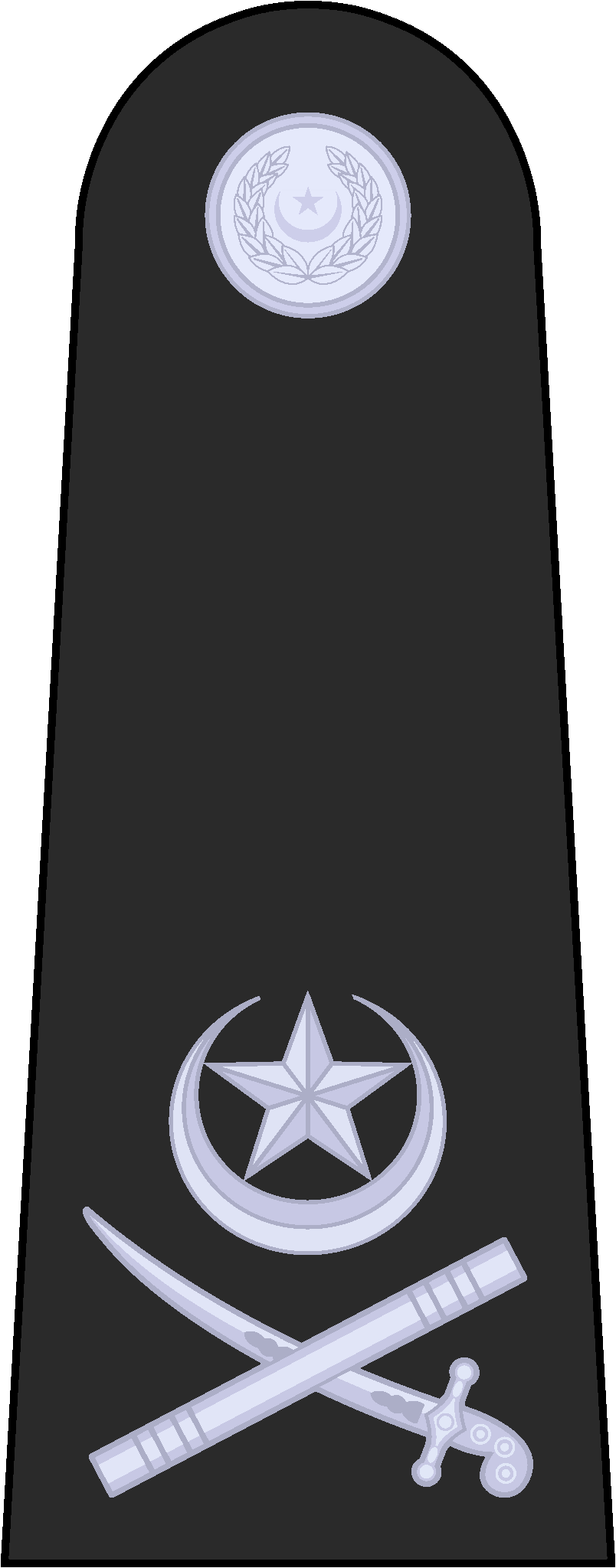
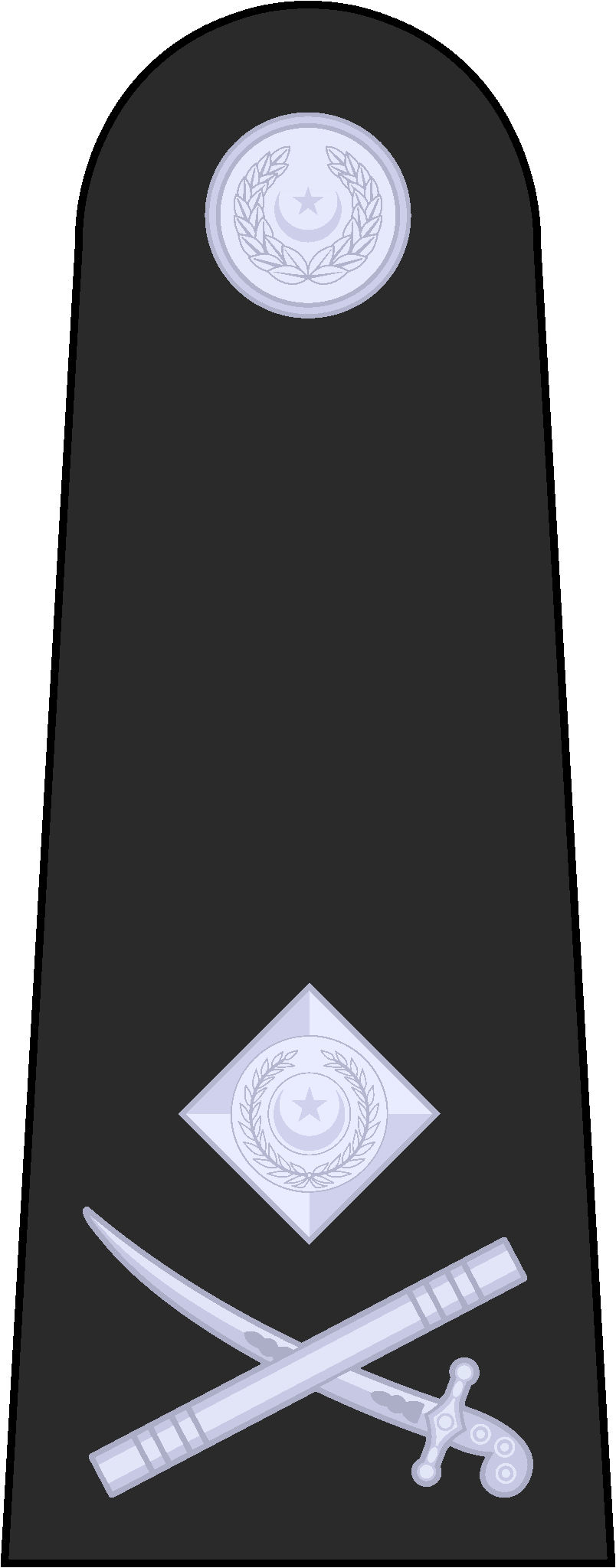
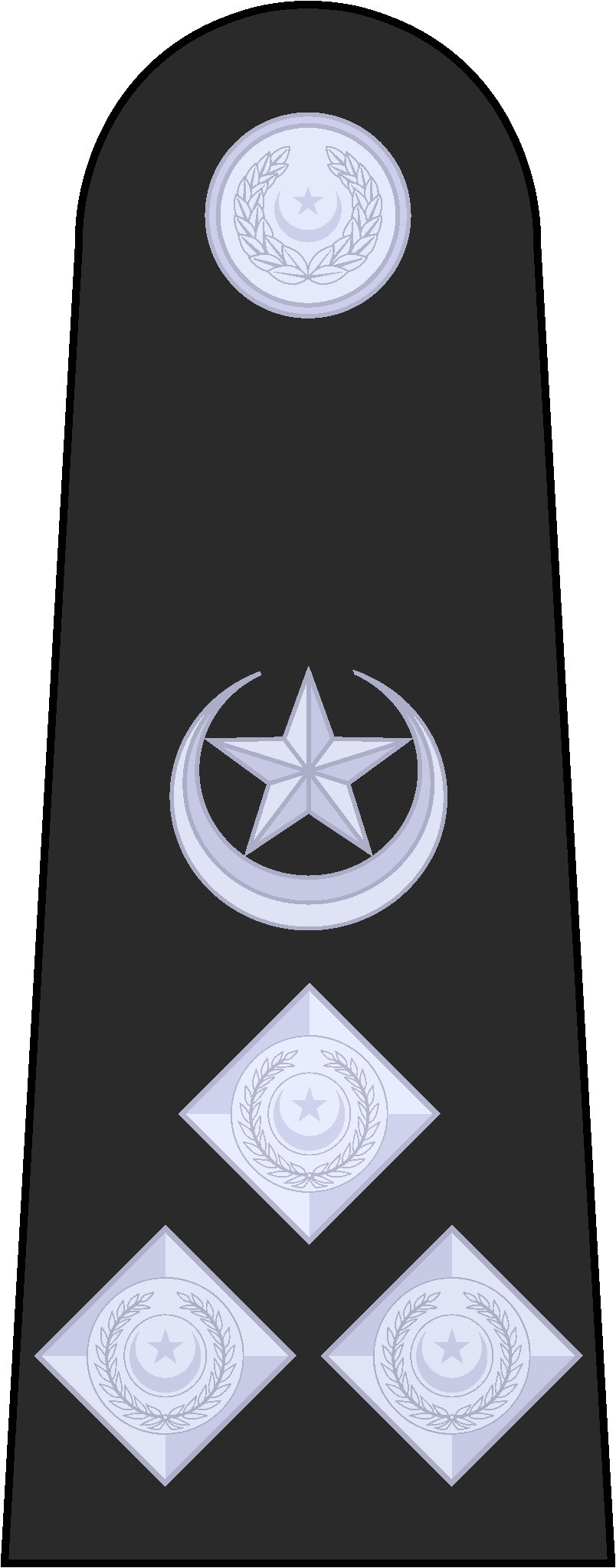
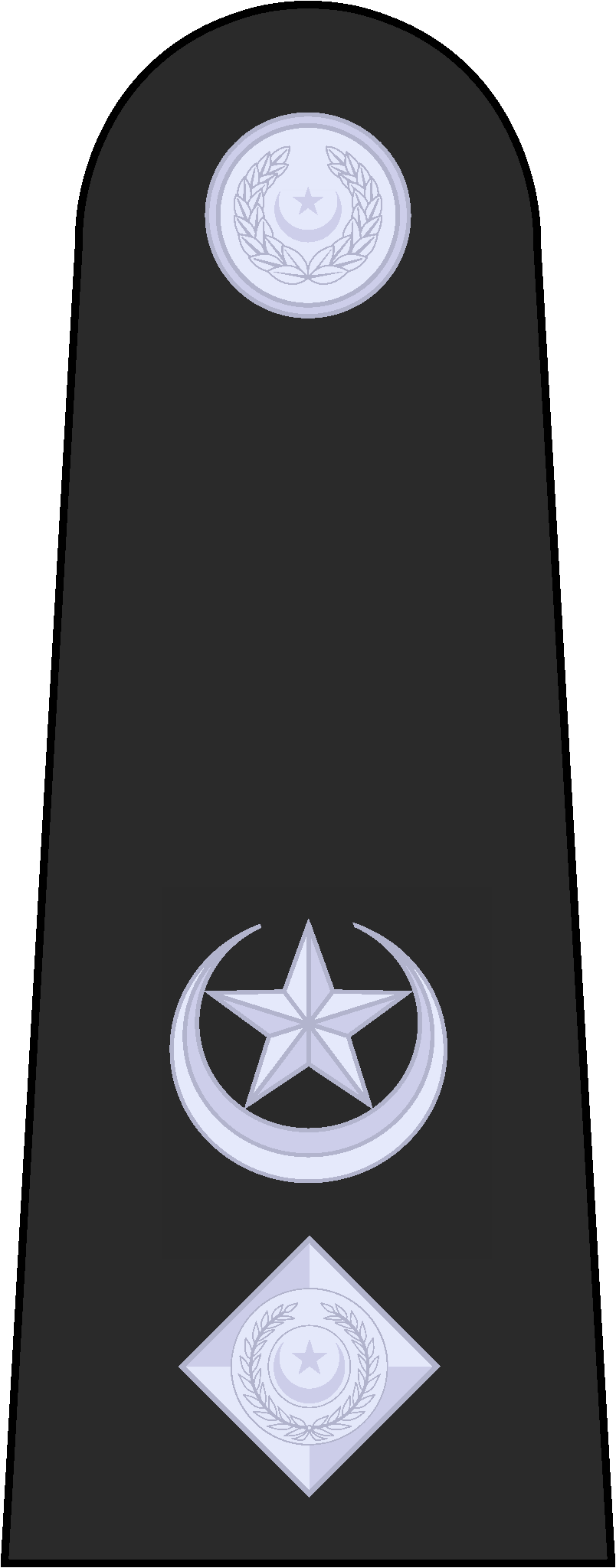
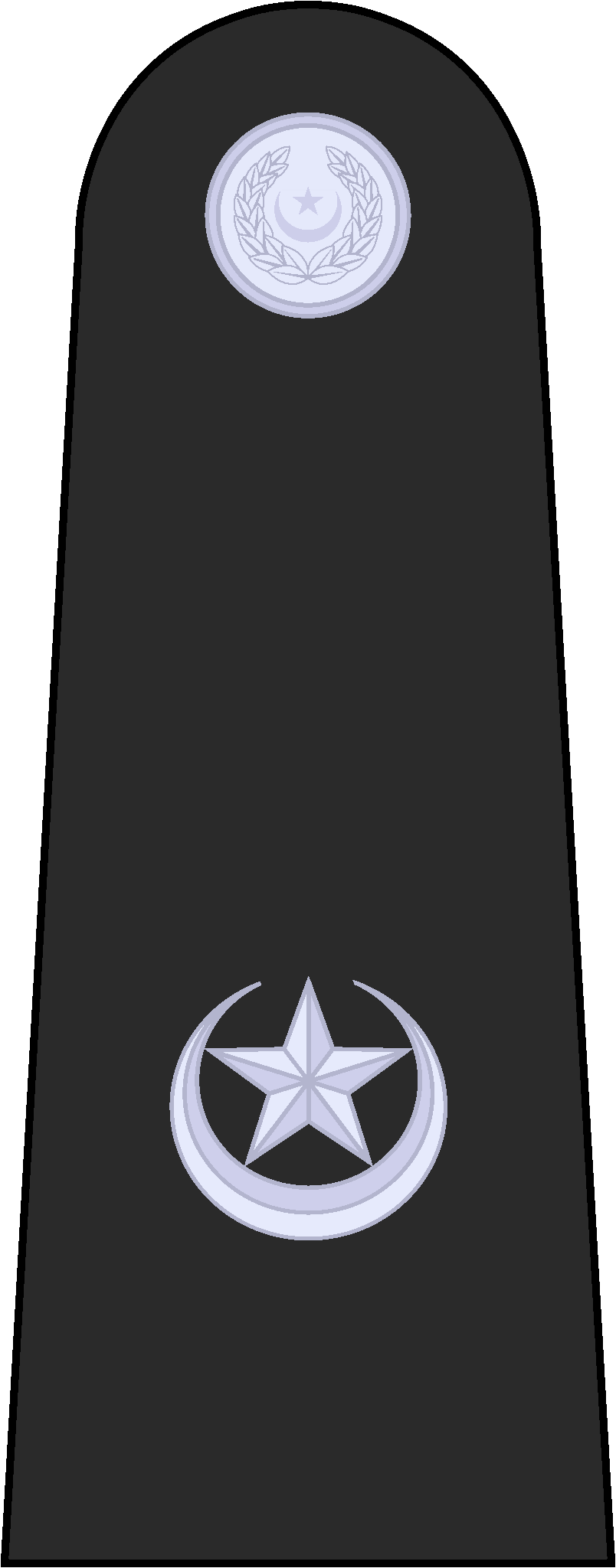
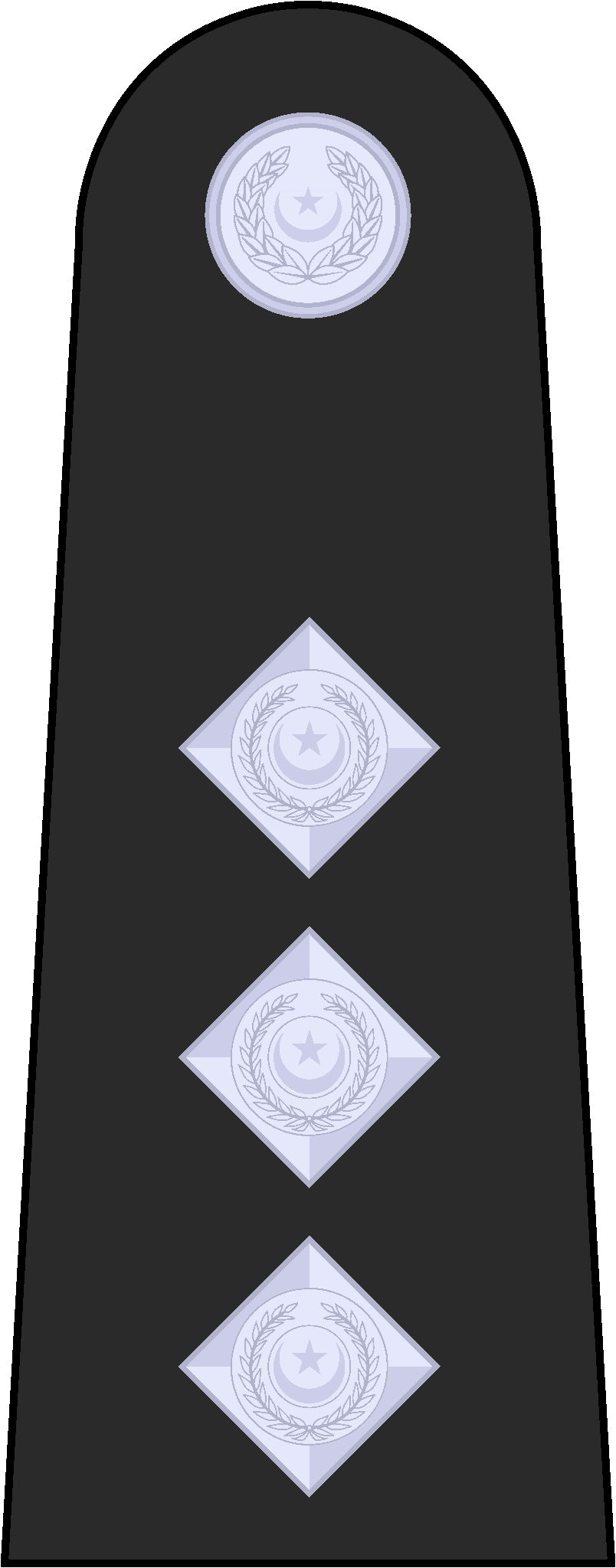
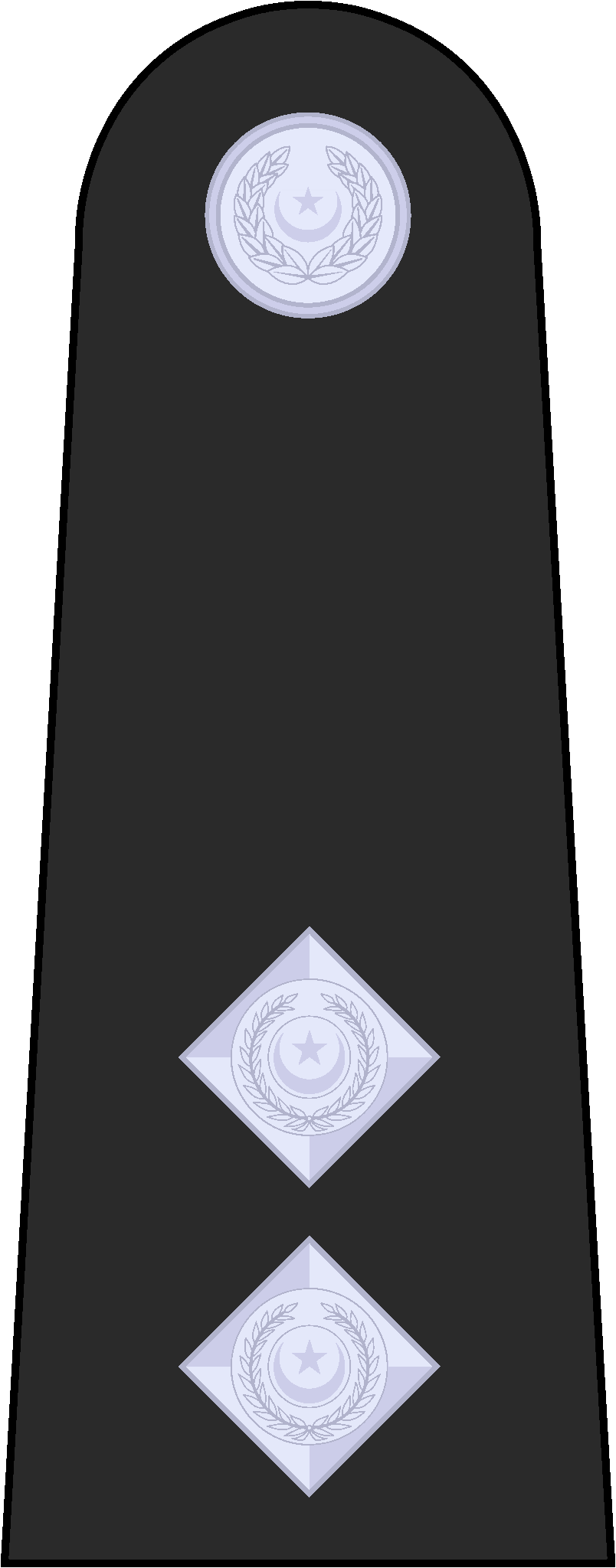
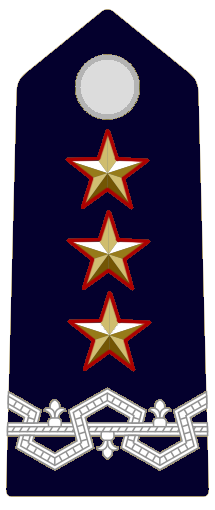
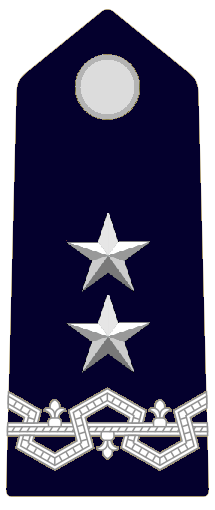
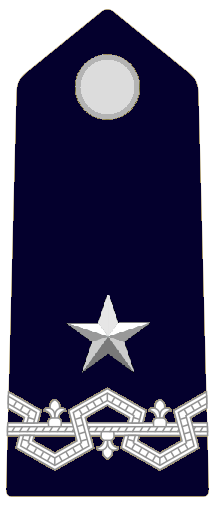
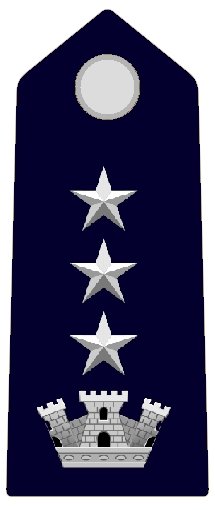
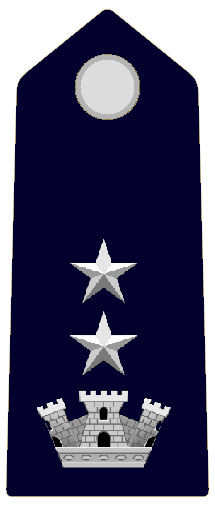
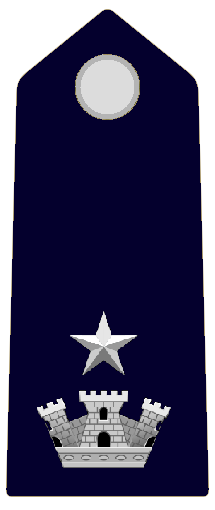
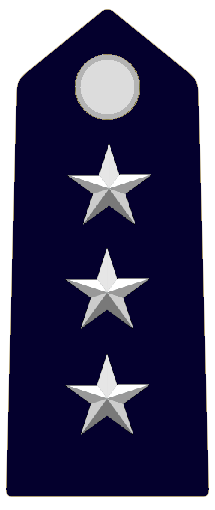
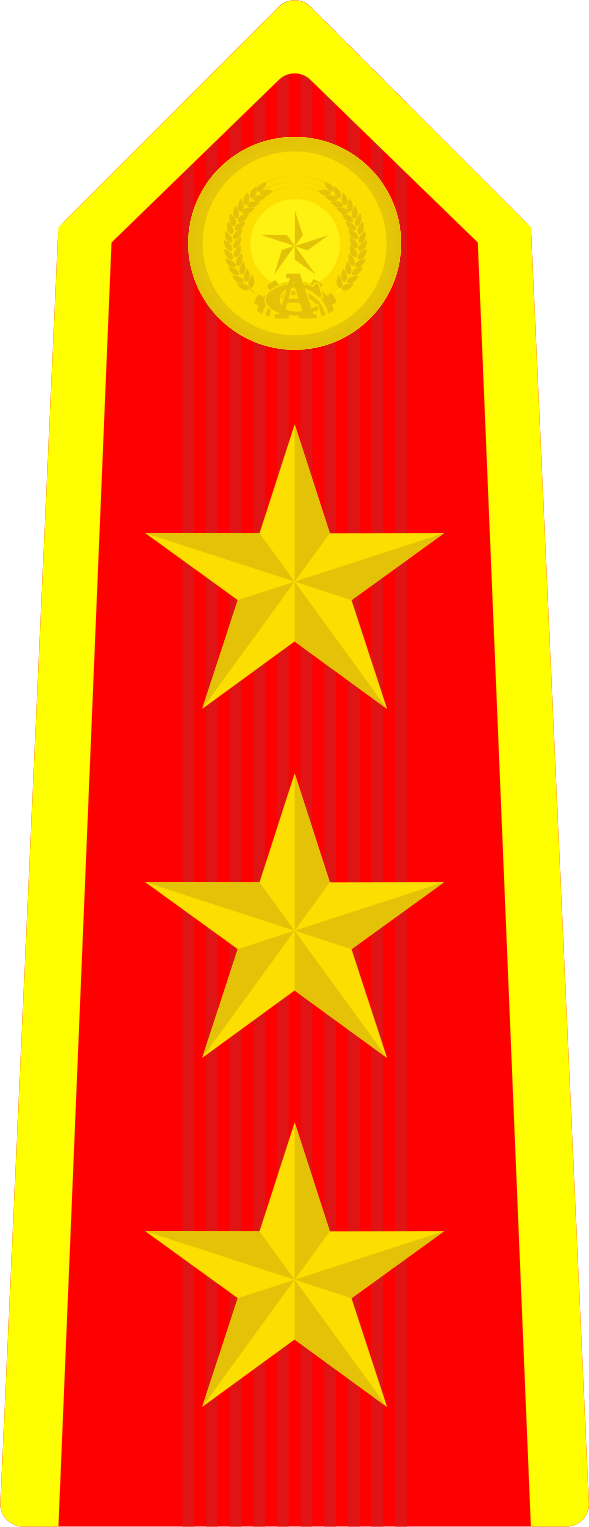
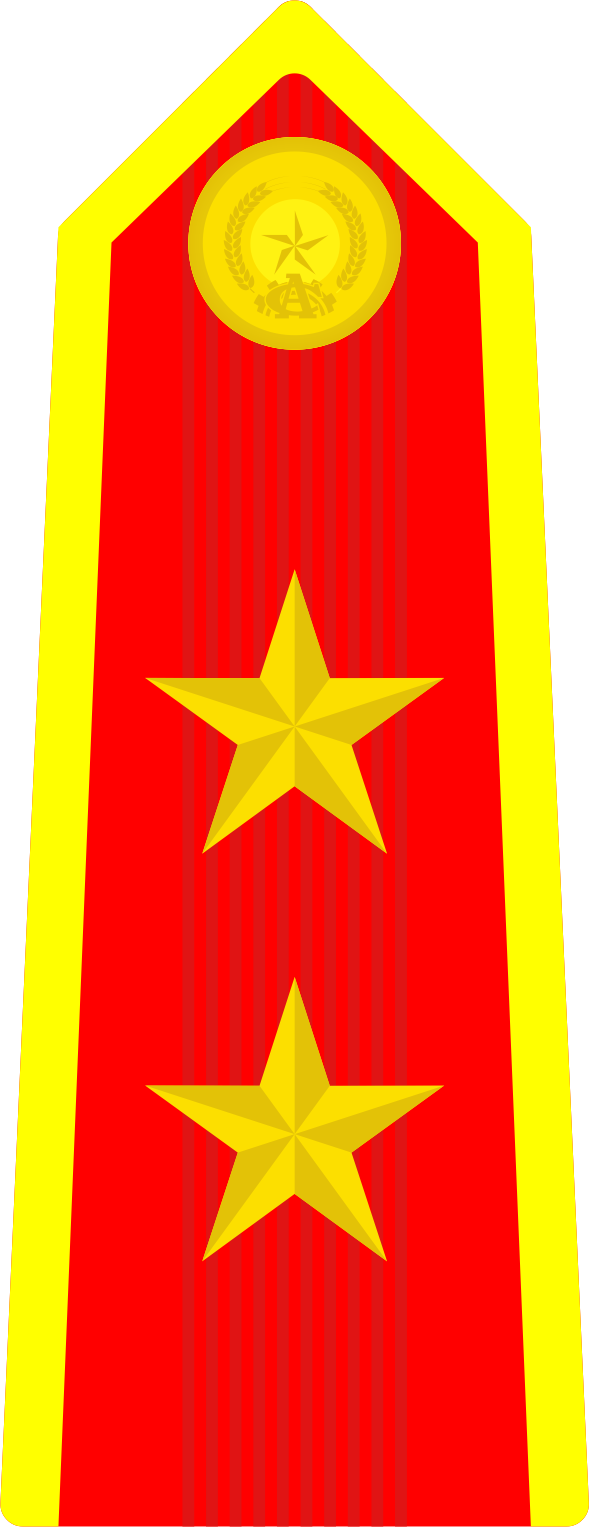
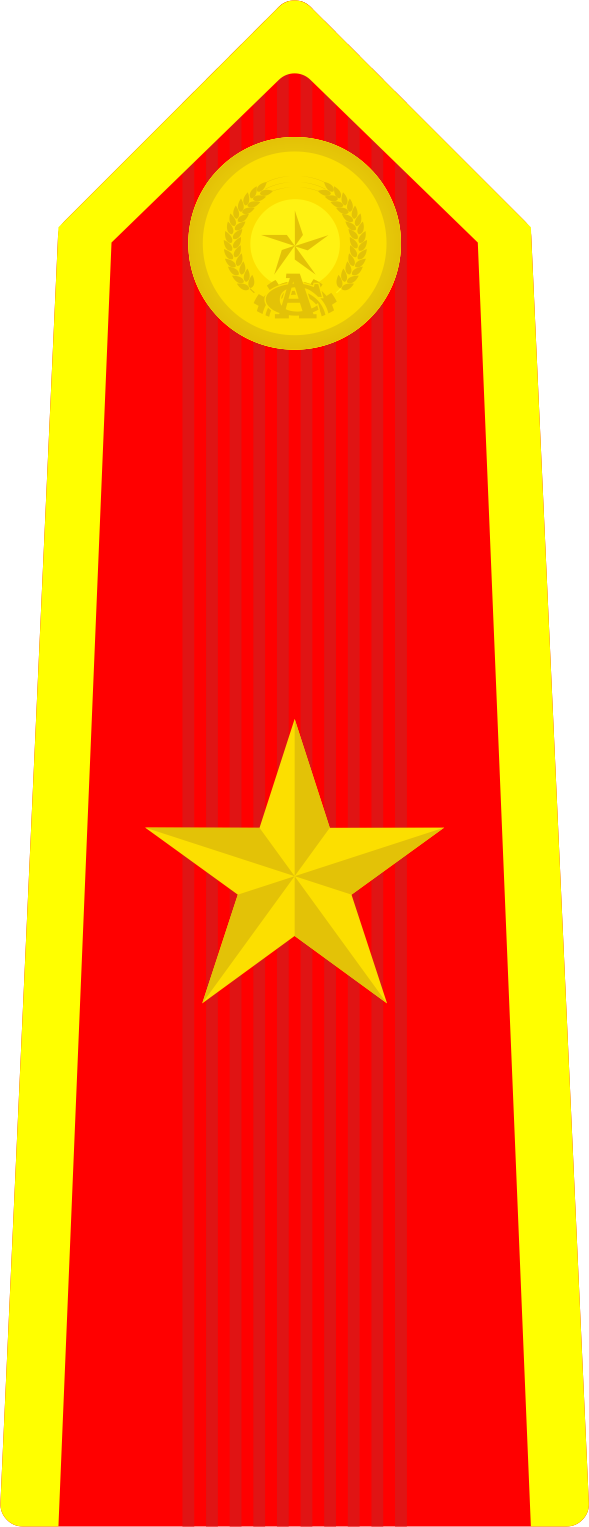
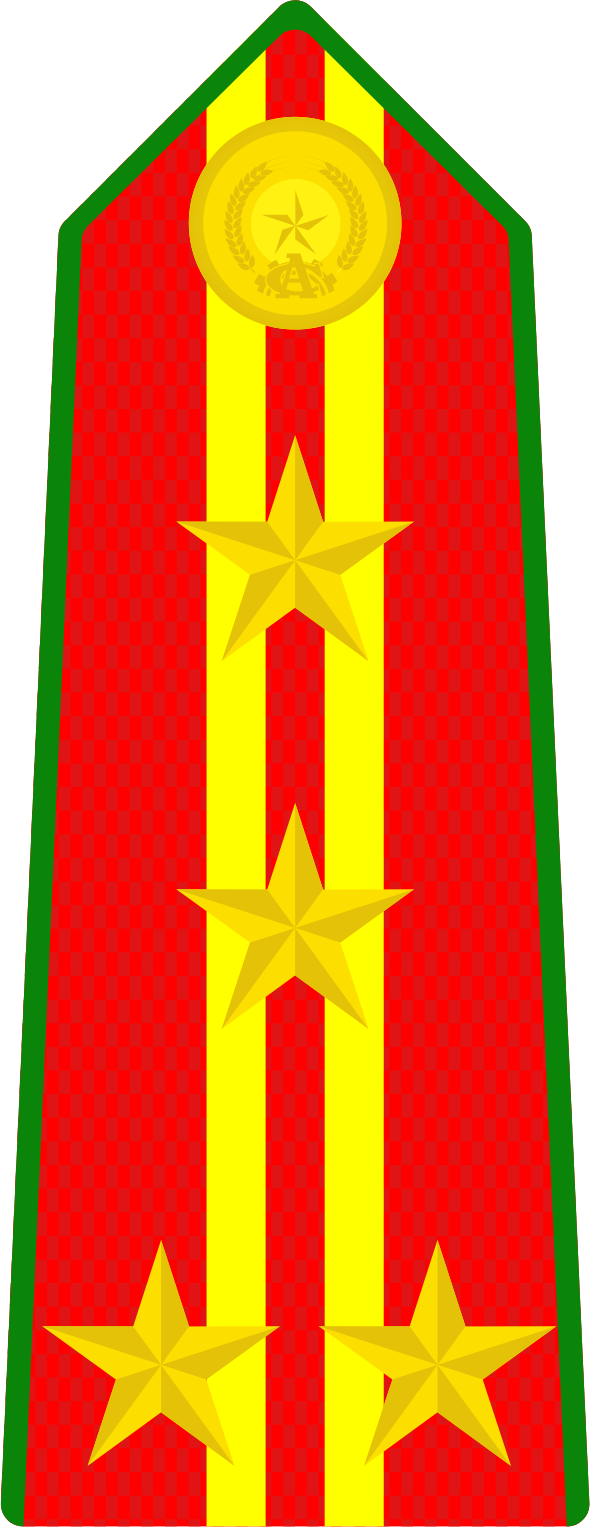
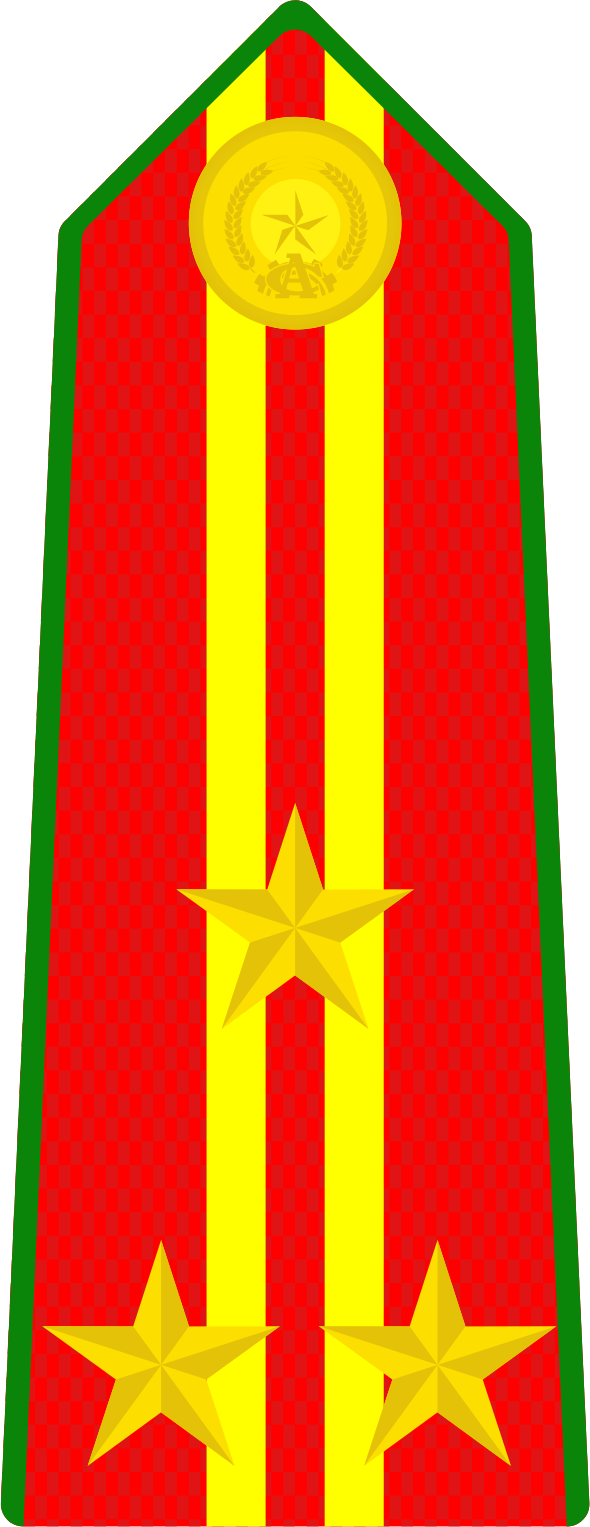
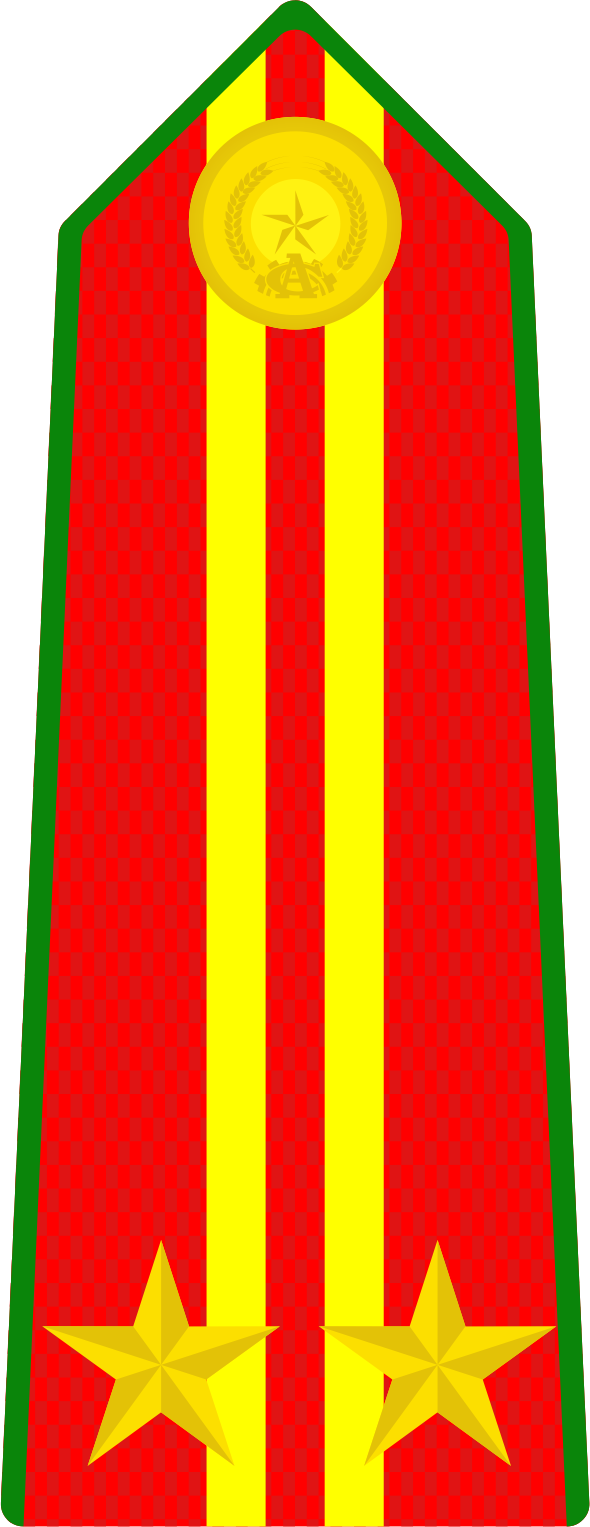
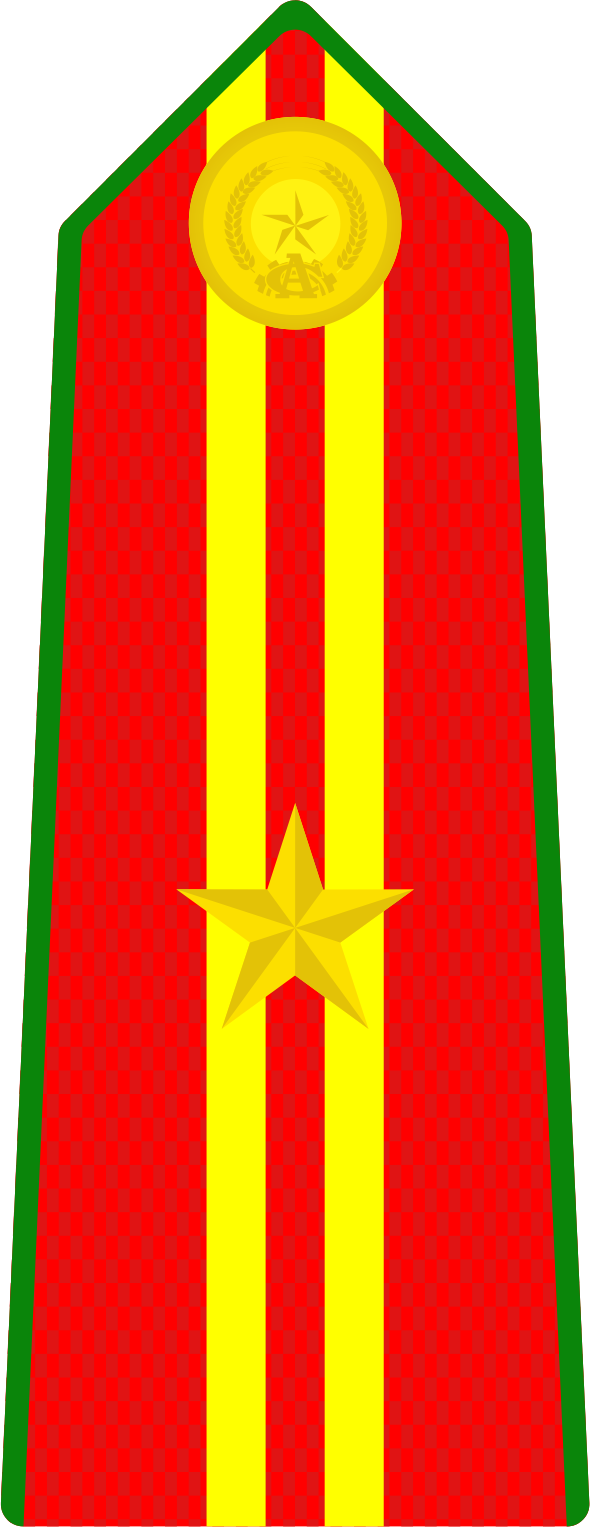
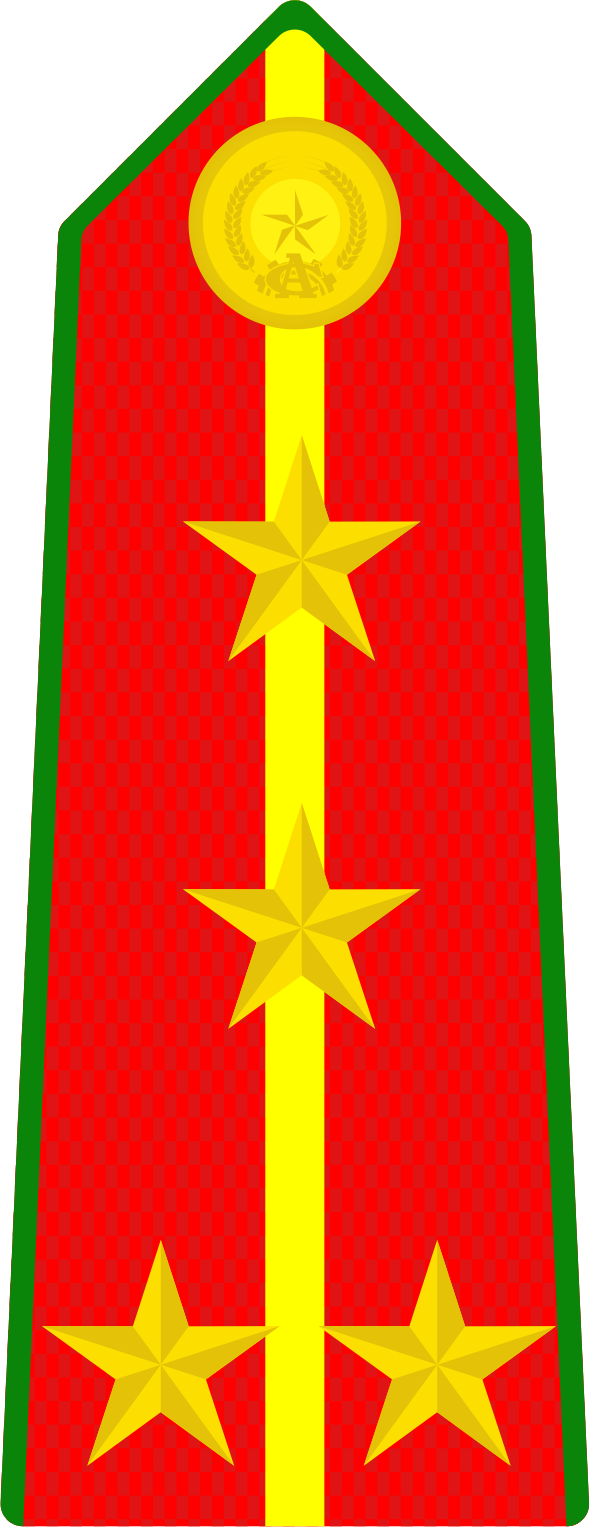
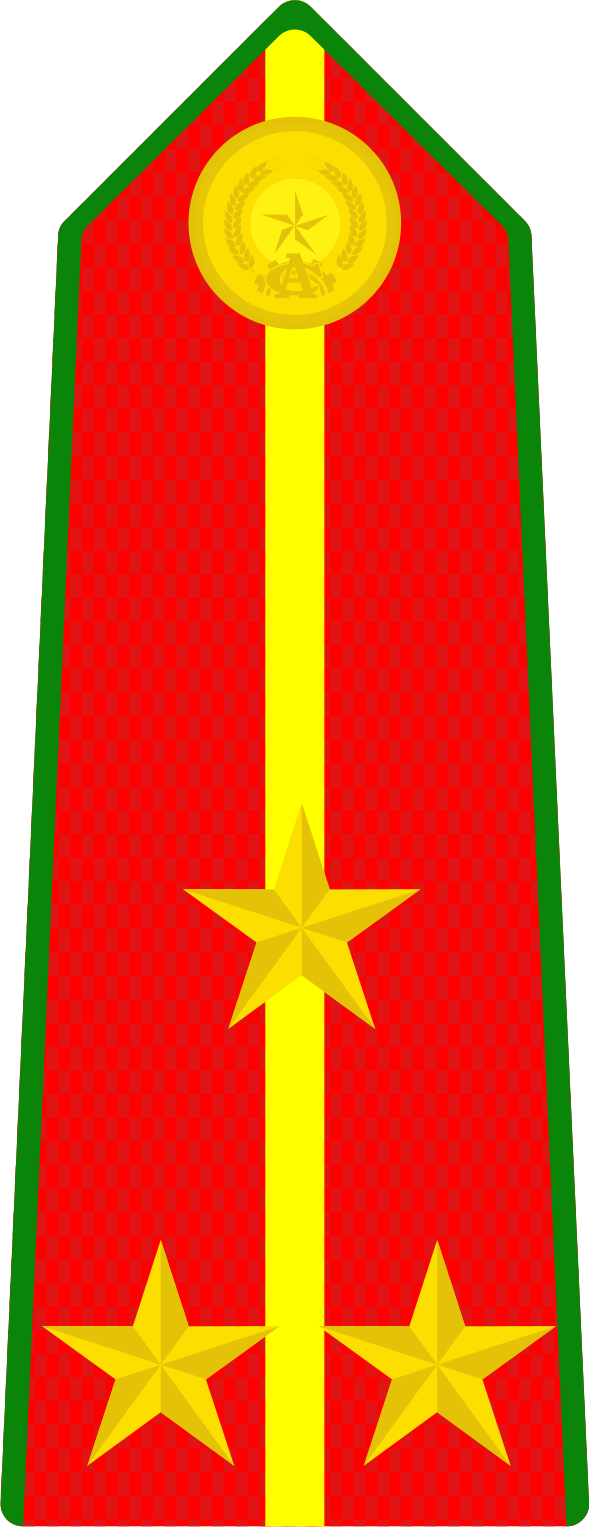
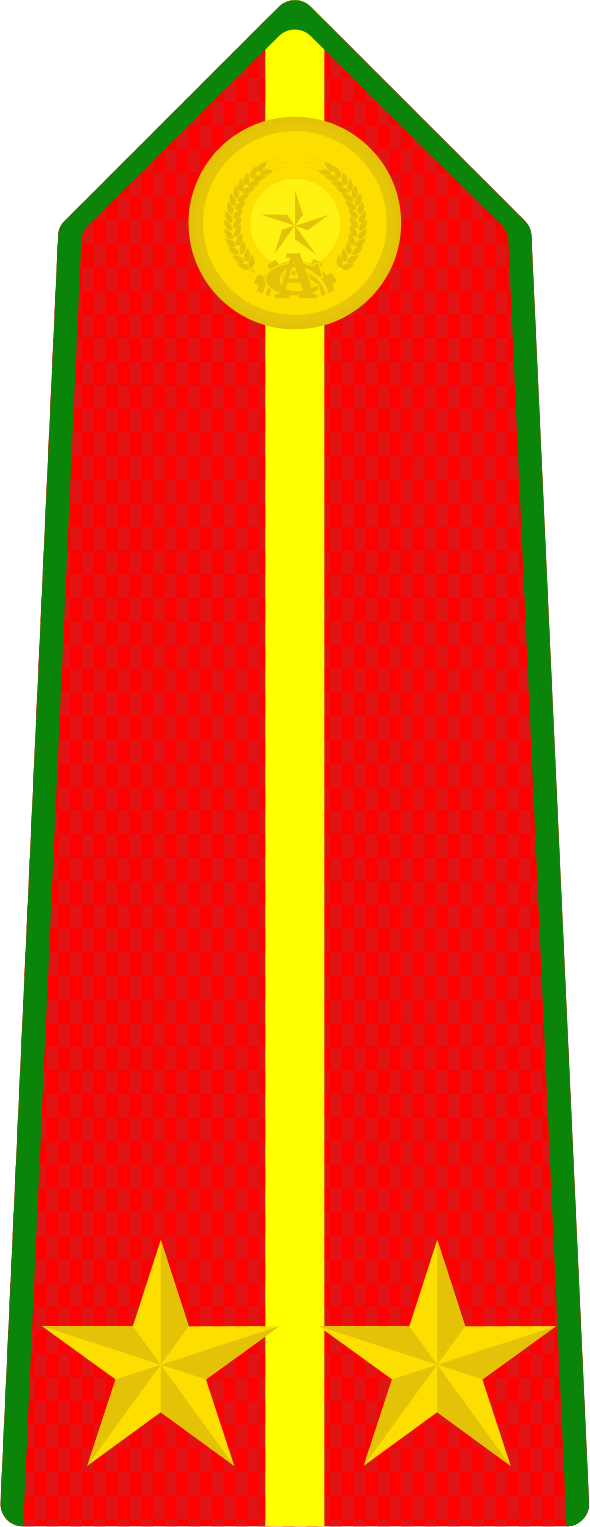
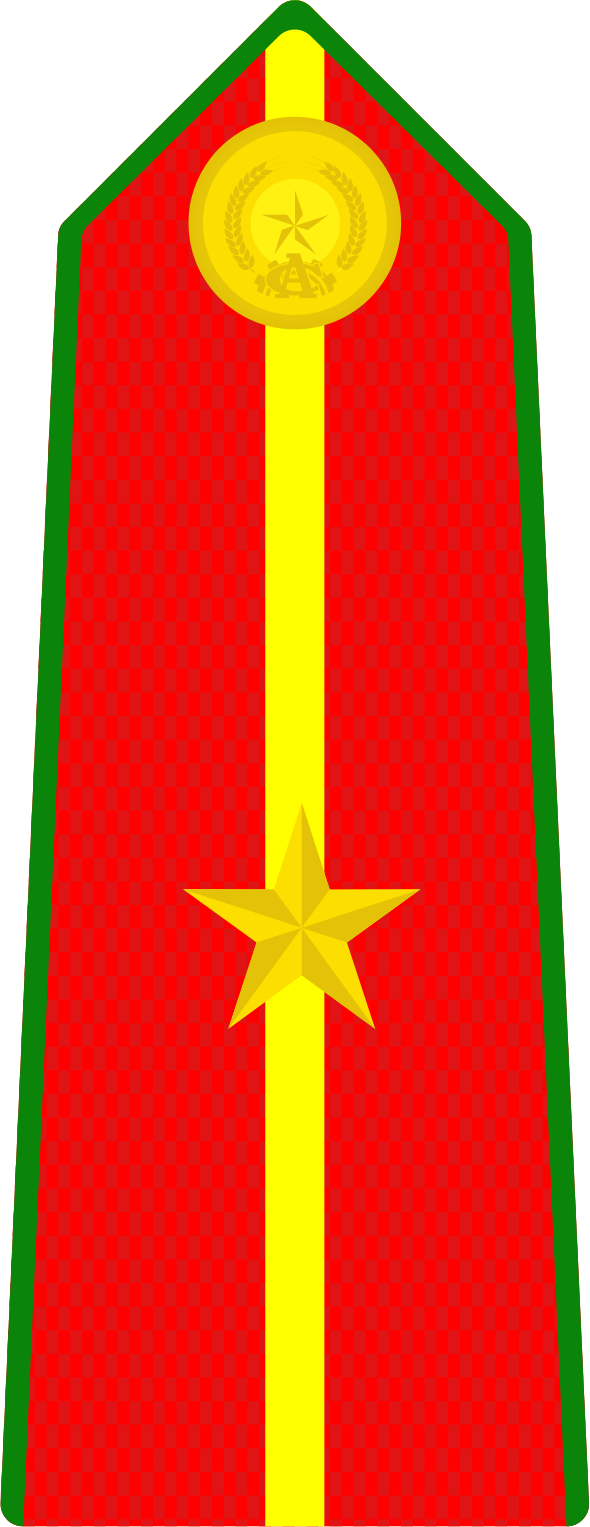
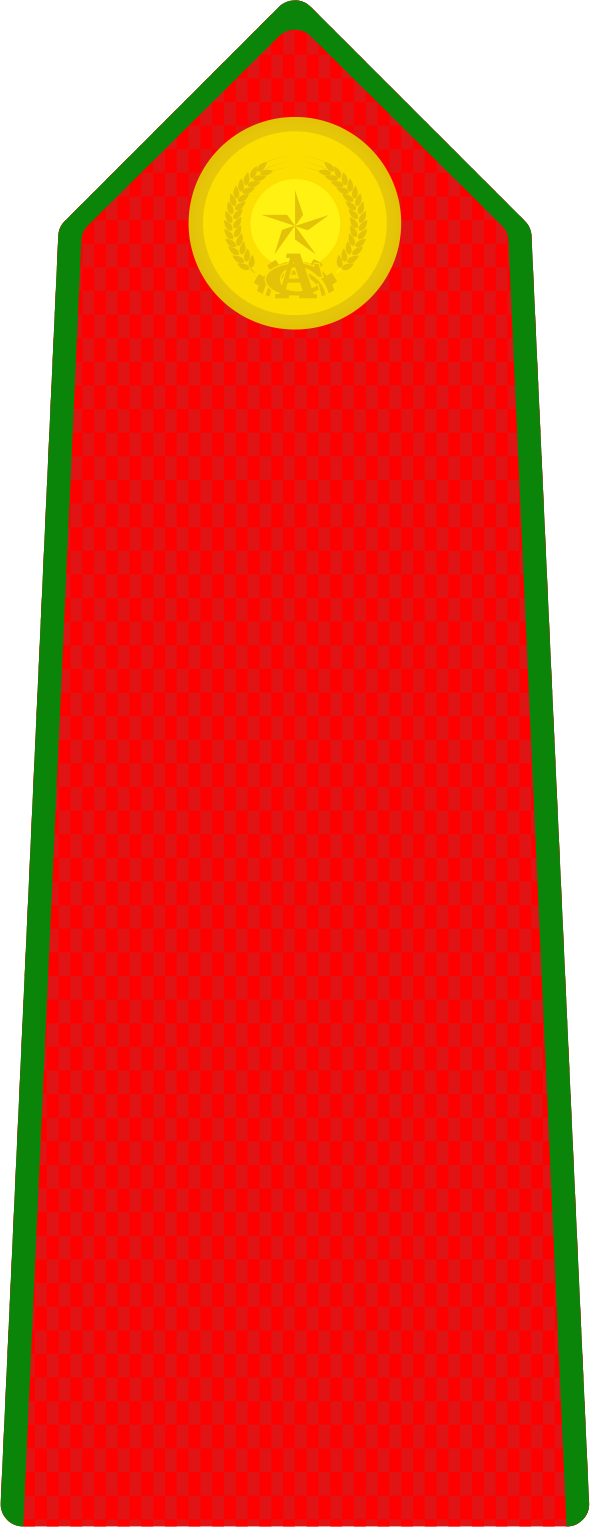
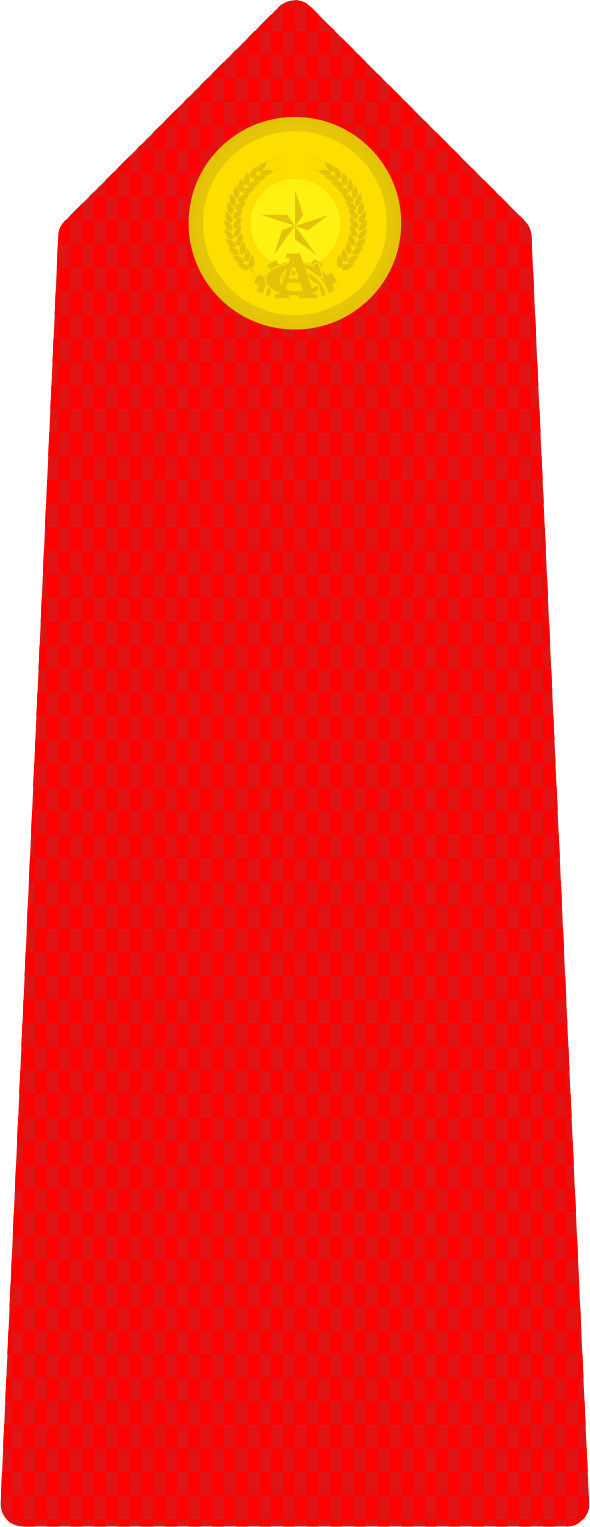
Rank group	General / flag officers							Senior officers				Junior officers
Algerian National Gendarmerie
Algerian National Gendarmerie					لواء; Liwāʾ	عميد 'Amīd		عقيد 'Aqīd		مقدم; Muqaddam	رائد; Rā'id	نقيب; Naqīb		ملازم أول; Mulāzim 'awwal			ملازم; Mulāzim
Algerian National Gendarmerie					Général de division	Général		Colonel		Lieutenant-colonel	Commandant	Capitaine		Lieutenant			Sous-lieutenant
Argentine National Gendarmerie
Argentine National Gendarmerie			Director Nacional		Subdirector Nacional	Comandante General		Comandante Mayor		Comandante Principal	Comandante	Segundo Comandante		Primer Alférez			Alférez	Subalferez
Argentine Naval Prefecture
Argentine Naval Prefecture			Prefecto General (Prefecto Nacional Naval)		Prefecto General (Subprefecto Nacional Naval)	Prefecto General		Prefecto Mayor		Prefecto Principal	Prefecto	Subprefecto		Oficial Principal			Oficial Auxiliar	Oficial Ayudante
Brazilian Military Police
Brazilian Military Police								Coronel		Tenente-coronel	Major	Capitão		Primeiro tenente			Segundo tenente
(Burkina Faso) Burkinabè National Gendarmerie
(Burkina Faso) Burkinabè National Gendarmerie		Général d'armée	Général de corps d'armée		Général de division	Général de brigade		Colonel-major	Colonel	Lieutenant-colonel	Commandant	Capitaine		Lieutenant			Sous-lieutenant
Royal Cambodian Gendarmerie
Royal Cambodian Gendarmerie		នាយឧត្ដមសេនីយ៍ Neay utdamsenei	ឧត្ដមសេនីយ៍ឯក; Utdamsenei ek		ឧត្តមសេនីយ៍ទោ Utdamsenei tou	ឧត្តមសេនីយ៍ត្រី Utdamsenei trei		វរសេនីយ៍ឯក; Veareasenei ek		វរសេនីយ៍ទោ Veareasenei tou	វរសេនីយ៍ត្រី Veareasenei trei	អនុសេនីយ៍ឯក; Anusenei ek		អនុសេនីយ៍ទោ Anusenei tou			អនុសេនីយ៍ត្រី Anusenei trei
(Cameroon) Cameroonian National Gendarmerie
(Cameroon) Cameroonian National Gendarmerie		Général d'armée	Général de corps d'armée		Général de division	Général de brigade		Colonel		Lieutenant-Colonel	Chef d'Escadron	Capitaine		Lieutenant			Sous-Lieutenant
Royal Canadian Mounted Police
Royal Canadian Mounted Police		Commissioner; Commissaire	Deputy commissioner Sous-commissaire			Assistant commissioner Commissaire adjoint		Chief superintendent Surintendant principal		Superintendent; Surintendant	Inspector; Inspecteur
Chadian National Gendarmerie
Chadian National Gendarmerie					Général de division	Général de brigade		Colonel		Lieutenant-Colonel	Commandant	Capitaine		Lieutenant			Sous-Lieutenant
Carabineros de Chile
Carabineros de Chile		General director	General inspector		General			Coronel		Teniente coronel	Mayor	Capitán		Teniente		Subteniente
Chilean Gendarmerie
Chilean Gendarmerie		Director nacional	Subdirector operativo					Coronel		Teniente coronel	Mayor	Capitán		Teniente 1°	Teniente 2°	Subteniente
People's Armed Police
People's Armed Police		武警上将; Wǔjǐng Shàngjiàng	武警中将; Wǔjǐng Zhōngjiàng		武警少将; Wǔjǐng Shàojiàng			武警大校; Wǔjǐng Dàxiào	武警上校; Wǔjǐng Shàngxiào	武警中校; Wǔjǐng Zhōngxiào	武警少校; Wǔjǐng Shàoxiào	武警上尉; Wǔjǐng Shàngwèi		武警中尉; Wǔjǐng Zhōngwèi			武警少尉; Wǔjǐng Shàowèi
Comorian Gendarmerie
Comorian Gendarmerie						Général de brigade		Colonel		Lieutenant-colonel	Commandant	Capitaine		Lieutenant			Sous-Lieutenant
Congolese Gendarmerie
Congolese Gendarmerie		Général d'armée	Général de corps		Général de division	Général de brigade		Colonel		Lieutenant-Colonel	Commandant	Capitaine		Lieutenant			Sous-lieutenant
(Djibouti) Djiboutian National Gendarmerie
(Djibouti) Djiboutian National Gendarmerie						Général de brigade		Colonel-major	Colonel	Lieutenant-colonel	Chef d'escadron	Capitaine		Lieutenant			Sous-lieutenant
(France) French Gendarmerie
(France) French Gendarmerie		Général d'armée	Général de corps d'armée		Général de division	Général de brigade		Colonel		Lieutenant-Colonel	Chef d'Escadron	Capitaine		Lieutenant			Sous-Lieutenant
Assam Rifles			Director-general (Note: Equivalent to the rank lieutenant general (लेफ्टिनेंट - जनरल)) - / Special director-general (Note: Equivalent to the rank lieutenant general (लेफ्टिनेंट - जनरल)) - / Additional director-general (Note: Equivalent to the rank lieutenant general (लेफ्टिनेंट - जनरल)) -
Assam Rifles			Director-general - / Special director-general - / Additional director-general -		Inspector general (Note: Equivalent to the rank major general (मेजर - जनरल)) -	Deputy inspector-general (Note: Equivalent to the rank brigadier (ब्रिगेडियर)) -		Commandant (Note: Equivalent to the rank colonel (कर्नल)) -		Second-in-command (Note: Equivalent to the rank lieutenant colonel (लेफ्टिनेंट - कर्नल)) -	Deputy commandant (Note: Equivalent to the rank major (मेजर)) -	Assistant commandant (Note: Equivalent to the rank captain (कप्तान)) -
Central Reserve Police Force			Director-general - / Special director-general - / Additional director-general -
Central Reserve Police Force			Director-general - / Special director-general - / Additional director-general -		Inspector general -	Deputy inspector-general -		Commandant -		Second-in-command -	Deputy commandant -	Assistant commandant -
Rank group	General / flag officers							Senior officers				Junior officers
Iranian Law Enforcement Command
Iranian Law Enforcement Command		ارتشبد; Arteshbod	سپهبد; Sepahbod		سرلشکر; Sarlashkar	سرتیپ; Sartip	سرتیپ دوم; Sartip dovom	سرهنگ; Sarhang		سرهنگ دوم; Sarhang dovom	سرگرد; Sargord	سروان; Sarvān		ستوان یکم; Sotvān yekom		ستوان دوم; Sotvān dovom	ستوان سوم; Sotvān sevom
Israel Border Police
Israel Border Police					ניצב; Nitzav	תת ניצב; Tat nitzav		ניצב משנה; Nitzav mishneh		סגן ניצב; Sgan nitzav	רב פקד; Rav pakad	פקד; Pakad		מפקח; Mefake'ah			מפקח משנה; Mefake'ah mishneh
Italian Carabinieri
Italian Carabinieri		Comandante generale dell'arma dei carabinieri	Vicecomandante generale dell'arma dei carabinieri	Generale di corpo d'armata	Generale di divisione	Generale di brigata		Colonnello		Tenente colonnello	Maggiore	Primo capitano	Capitano	Tenente			Sottotenente
Italian Guardia di Finanza
Italian Guardia di Finanza		Generale di Corpo d'Armata Commandante generale della Guardia di Finanza	Generale di Corpo d'Armata Commandante in seconda della Guardia di Finanza	Generale di Corpo d'Armata	Generale di Divisione	Generale di Brigata		Colonnello		Tenente Colonnello	Maggiore	Primo capitano	Capitano	Tenente			Sottotenente
Mauritius Police Force
Mauritius Police Force			Commissioner		Deputy Commissioner	Assistant Commissioner		Superintendent		Assistant Superintendent	Deputy Assistant Superintendent	Chief Inspector		Inspector			Cadet Officer
Mexican National Guard
Mexican National Guard			Comisario General		Comisario Jefe	Comisario		Inspector General		Inspector Jefe	Inspector	Subinspector Primero	Subinspector Segundo	Oficial			Suboficial
Army of Monaco
Army of Monaco	Général en chef des armées							Colonel		Lieutenant-colonel	Commandant	Capitaine		Lieutenant			Sous-Lieutenant
Royal Moroccan Gendarmerie
Royal Moroccan Gendarmerie			Général de corps d'armée		Général de division	Général de brigade		Colonel Major	Colonel	Lieutenant-Colonel	Commandant	Capitaine		Lieutenant			Sous-lieutenant
Royal Marechaussee
Royal Marechaussee			Luitenant-generaal		Generaal-majoor	Brigade-generaal		Kolonel		Luitenant-kolonel	Majoor	Kapitein		Eerste-luitenant			Tweede-luitenant
National Gendarmerie of Niger
National Gendarmerie of Niger		Général d'armée	Général de corps d'armée		Général de division	Général de brigade		Colonel		Lieutenant-colonel	Commandant	Capitaine		Lieutenant			Sous-lieutenant
Pakistan; Federal Constabulary
Pakistan; Federal Constabulary			Commandant Federal Constabulary کمانڈنٹ			Deputy commandant ڈپٹی کمانڈنٹ۔				District officer ضلعی افسر۔		Assistant district officer اسسٹنٹ ڈسٹرکٹ آفیسر۔
Pakistan Rangers
Pakistan Rangers					Director general ڈائریکٹر جنرل					Senior superintendent of the Rangers سینئر سپرنٹنڈنٹ۔	Superintendent of the Rangers سپرنٹنڈنٹ	Deputy superintendent of the Rangers ڈپٹی سپرنٹنڈنٹ۔		Inspector انسپکٹر			Direct Entry Sub inspector ڈائریکٹ انٹری سب انسپکٹر۔
Rank group	General / flag officers							Senior officers				Junior officers
Żandarmeria wojskowa
Żandarmeria wojskowa						Generał brygady		Pułkownik		Podpułkownik	Major	Kapitan		Porucznik			Podporucznik
National Republican Guard
National Republican Guard			Tenente-general; Comandante-general	Tenente-general	Major-general			Coronel		Tenente-coronel	Major	Capitão		Tenente			Alferes
(Romania) Romanian Gendarmerie
(Romania) Romanian Gendarmerie	Mareșal	General	General-locotenent		General-maior	General de brigadă		Colonel		Locotenent-colonel	Maior	Căpitan		Locotenent			Sublocotenent
Corps of Gendarmerie of San Marino
Corps of Gendarmerie of San Marino						Generale Brigata		Colonnello		Tenente Colonnello	Maggiore	Capitano		Tenente			Sottotenente
Senegalese Gendarmerie
Senegalese Gendarmerie			Général de corps d'armée		Général de division	Général de brigade		Colonel		Lieutenant-colonel	Commandant	Capitaine		Lieutenant			Sous-lieutenant
(Spain) Spanish Civil Guard
(Spain) Spanish Civil Guard			Teniente general		General de división	General de brigada		Coronel		Teniente coronel	Comandante	Capitán		Teniente			Alférez
Turkish Gendarmerie
Turkish Gendarmerie		Orgeneral	Korgeneral		Tümgeneral	Tuğgeneral		Albay		Yarbay	Binbaşı	Yüzbaşı		Üsteğmen		Teğmen	Asteğmen
Republic of China Military Police
Republic of China Military Police			中將; Tiong-chiòng		少將; Siáu-chiòng			上校; Siōng-hāu		中校; Tiong-hāu	少校; Siáu-hāu	上尉; Siōng-ùi		中尉; Tiong-ùi			少尉; Siáu-ùi
United States Coast Guard
United States Coast Guard		Admiral	Vice admiral		Rear admiral	Rear admiral (lower half)		Captain		Commander	Lieutenant commander	Lieutenant		Lieutenant (junior grade)			Ensign
Vanuatu Mobile Forces
Vanuatu Mobile Forces					Major general Bigfala Jenerol	Brigadier		Colonel; Kolonel		Lieutenant colonel Lietnen Kolonel	Major; Bigfala	Captain; Kapten		First lieutenant Fas Lietnen			Second lieutenant Seken Lietnen
Gendarmerie of Vatican City
Gendarmerie of Vatican City			Ispettore generale		Dirigente generale	Dirigente superiore		Primo dirigente		Dirigente	Commissario	Vice commissario
Vietnam People's; Public Security
Vietnam People's; Public Security		General (Đại tướng)	Colonel general (Thượng tướng)		Lieutenant general (Trung tướng)	Major general (Thiếu tướng)		Senior colonel (Đại tá)	Colonel (Thượng tá)	Lieutenant colonel (Trung tá)	Major (Thiếu tá)	Captain (Đại úy)		Senior lieutenant (Thượng úy)		Lieutenant (Trung úy)	Second lieutenant (Thiếu úy)	University - college cadet (Học viên Đại học - Cao đẳng)	Intermediate - primary student (Học viên Trung cấp - Sơ cấp)
Rank group	General / flag officers							Senior officers				Junior officers

== Enlisted ==
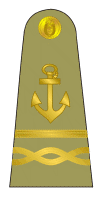
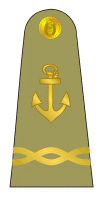
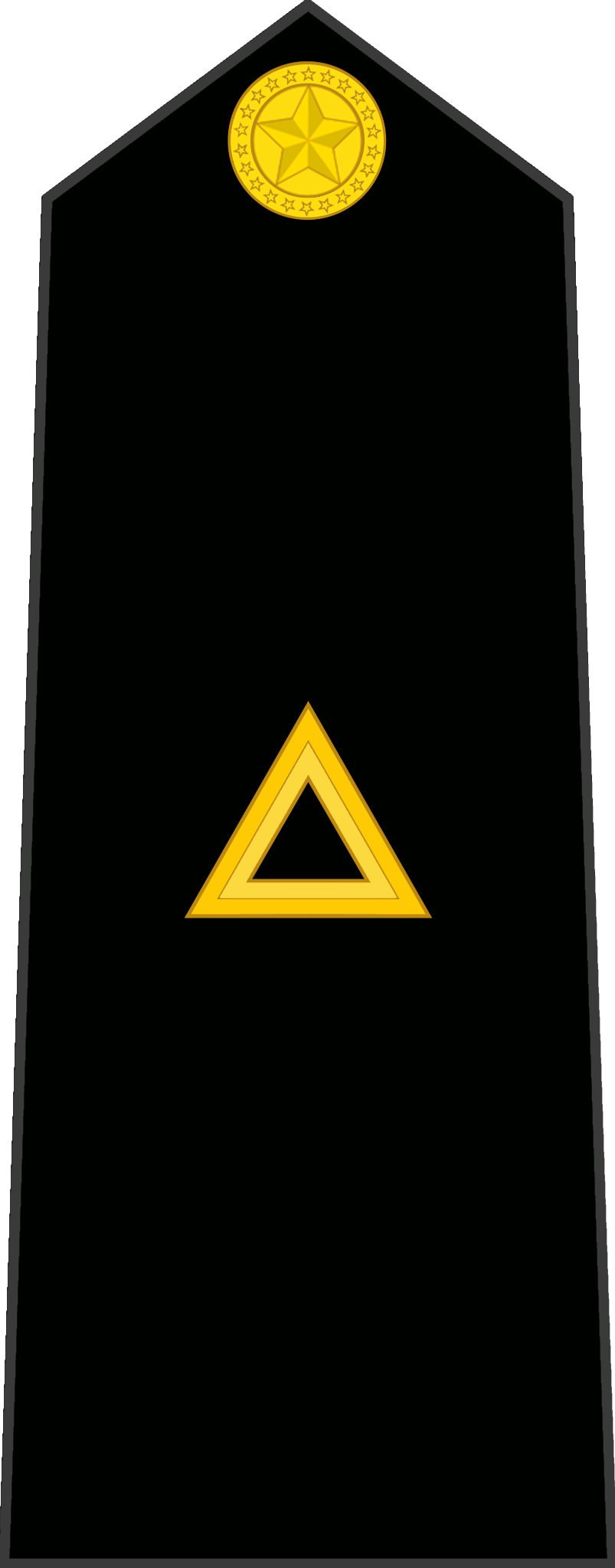
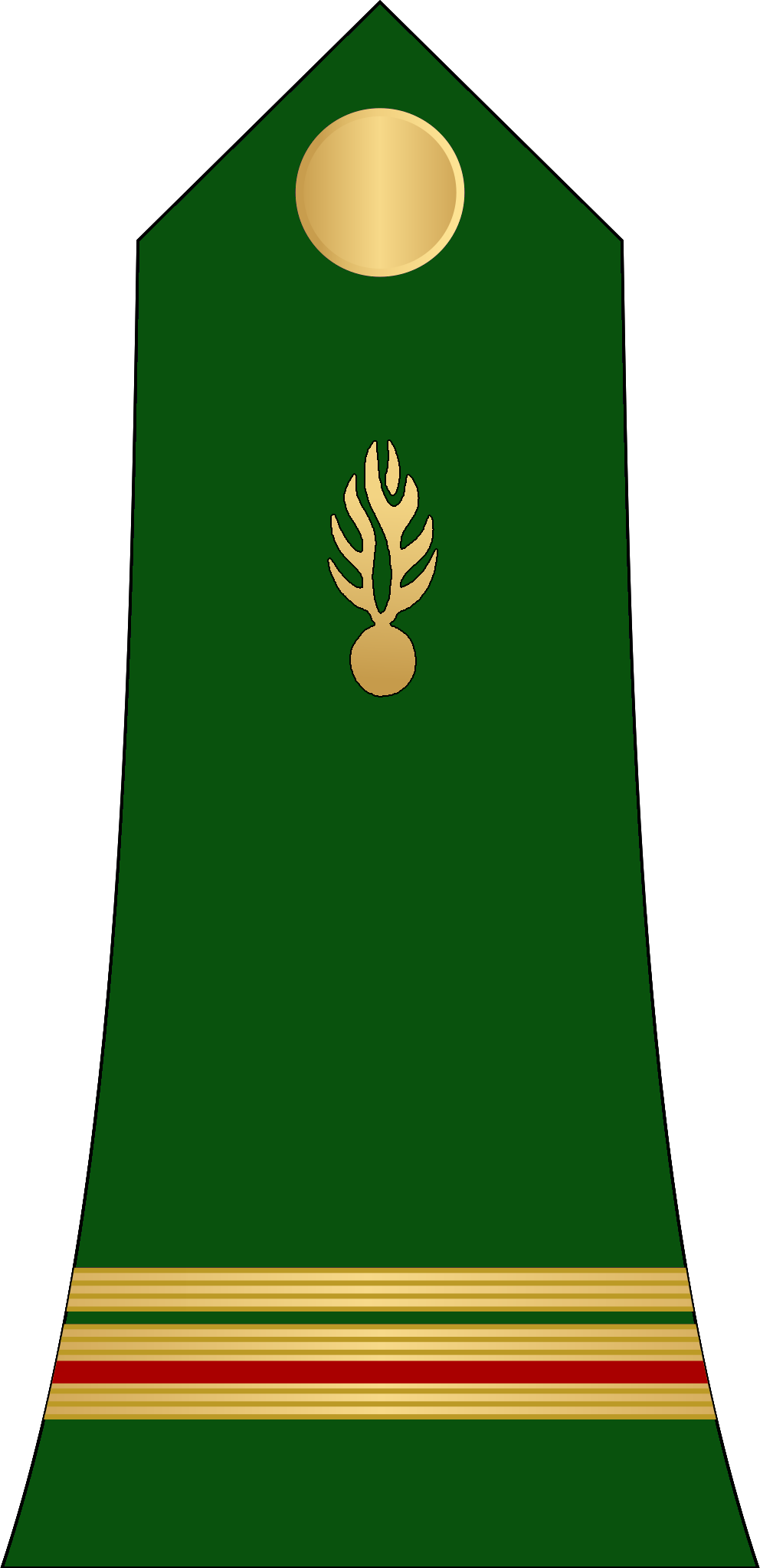
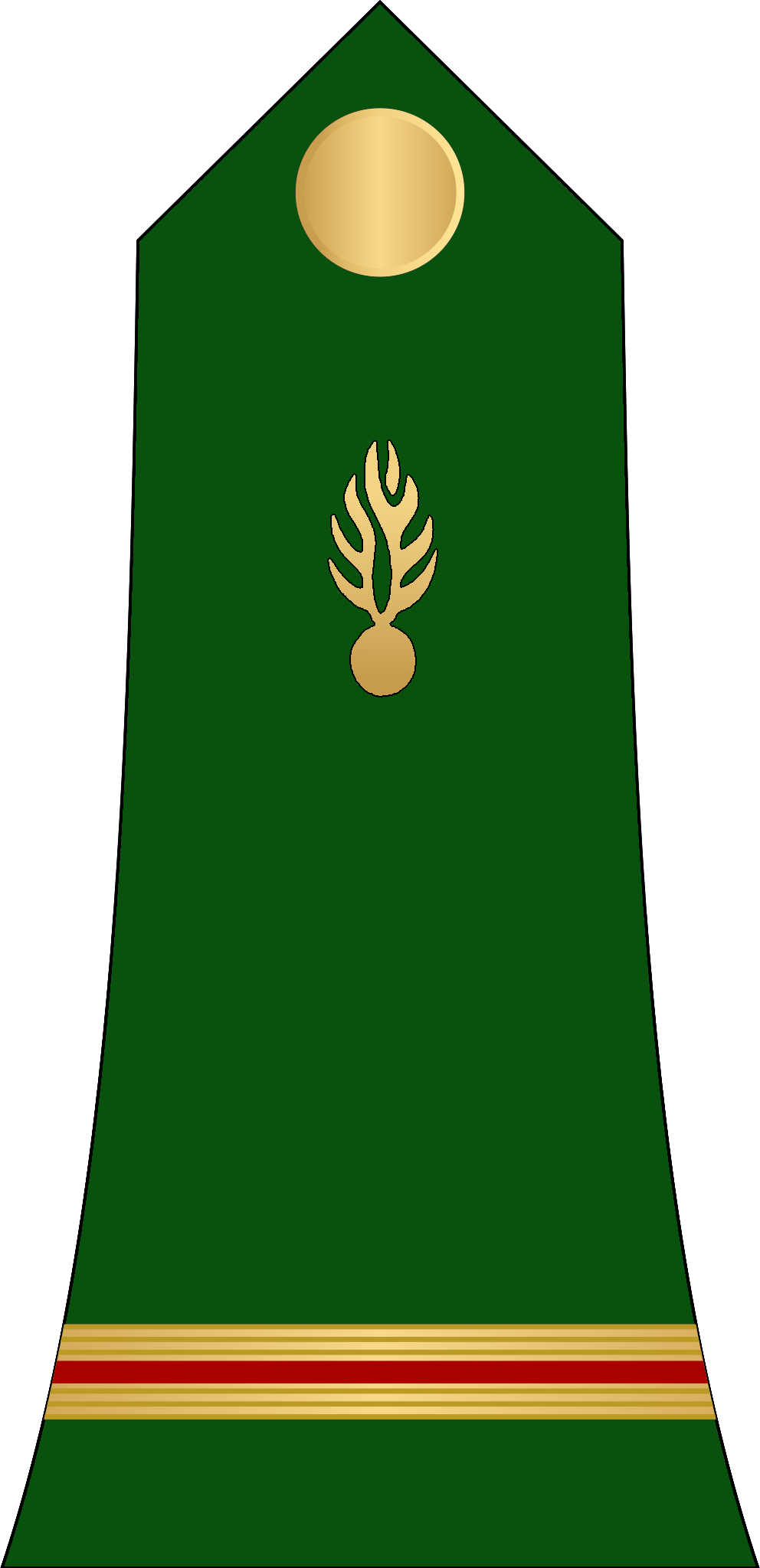
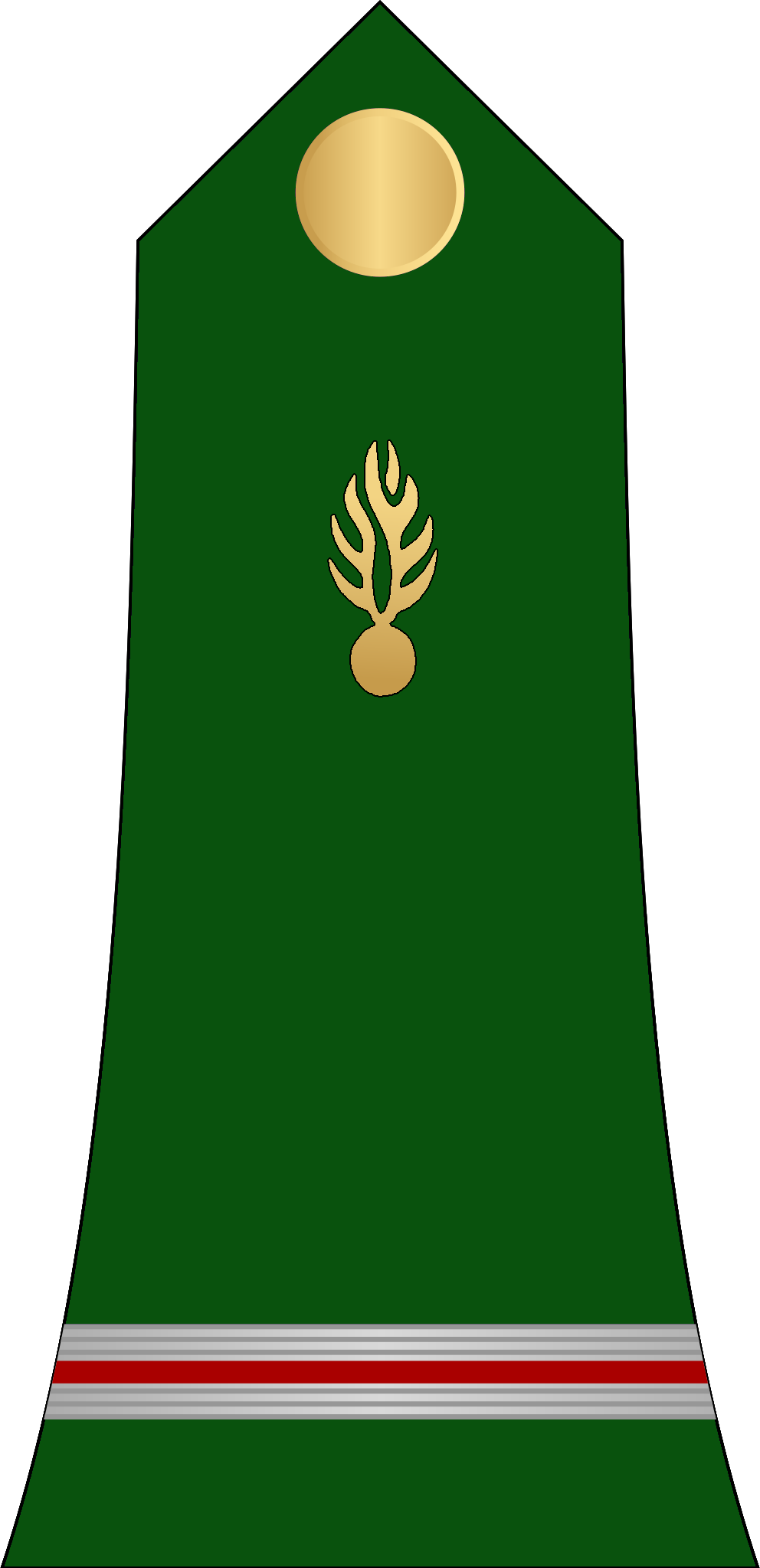
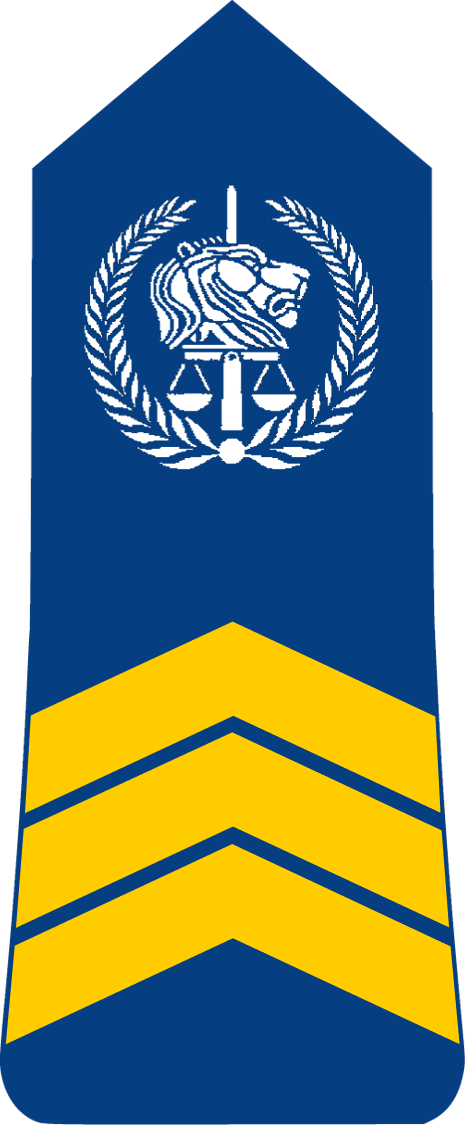
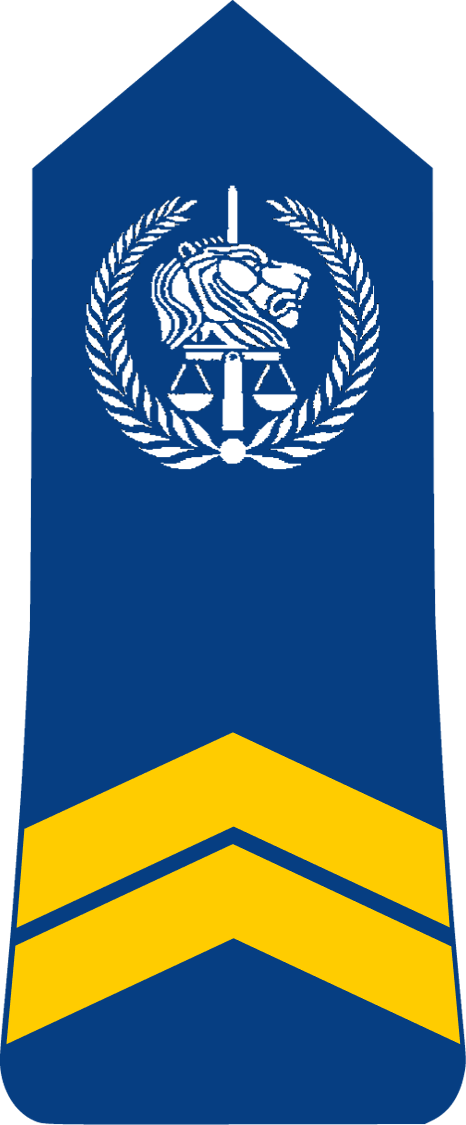
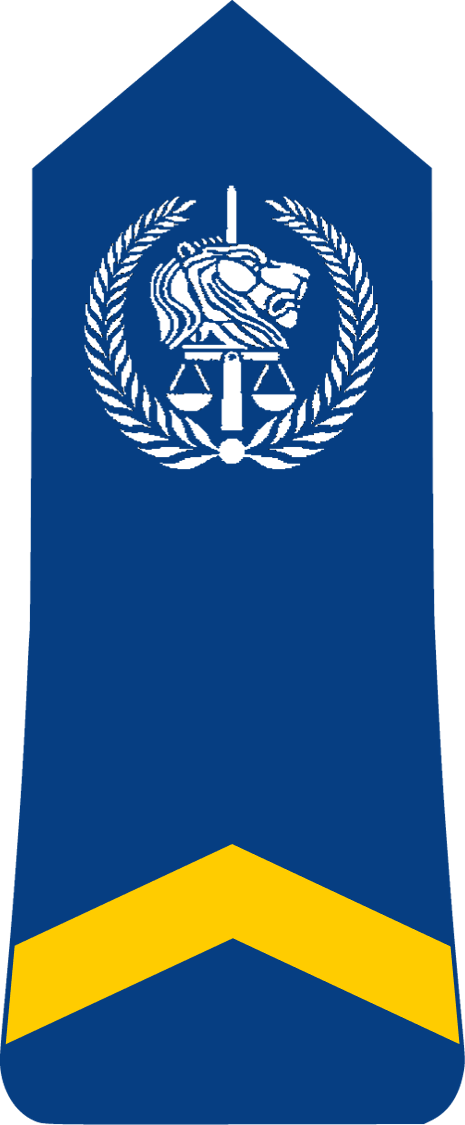
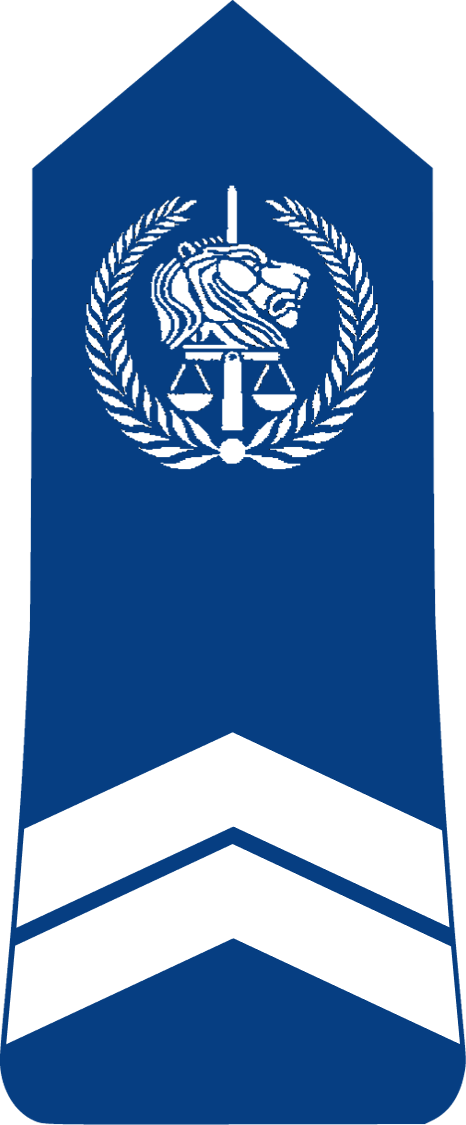
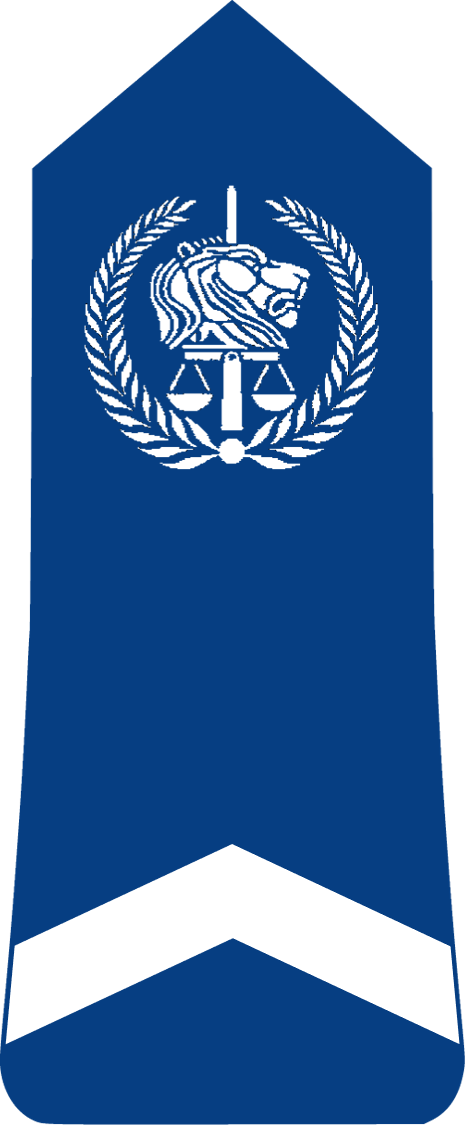
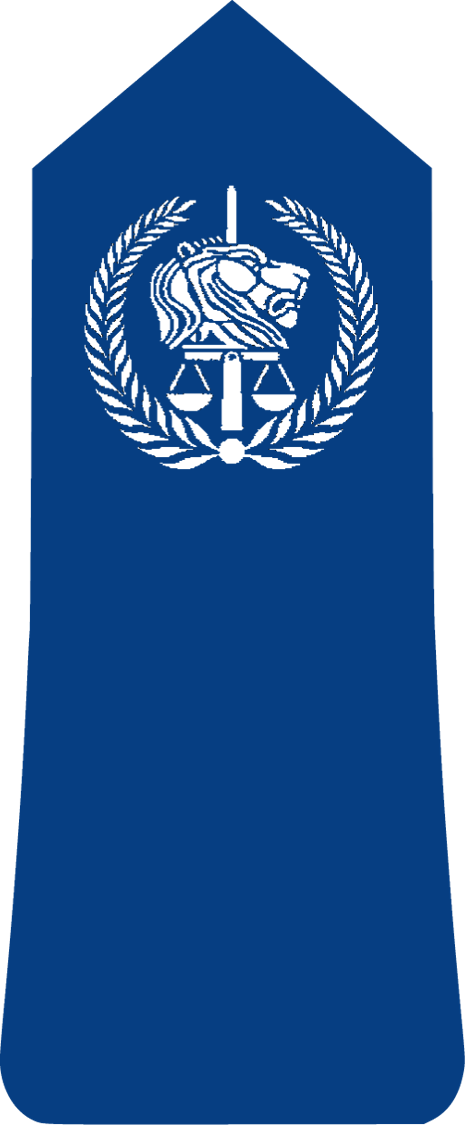
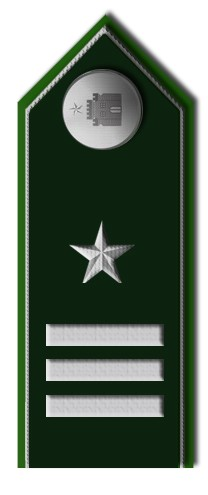
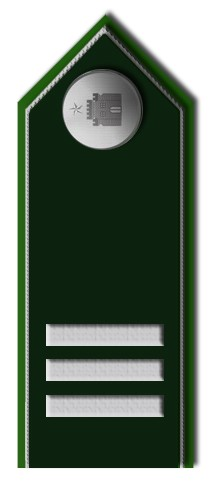
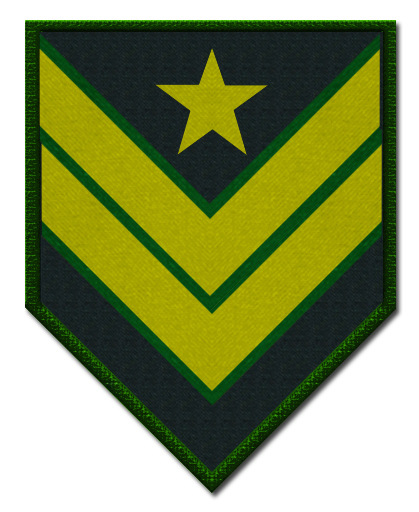
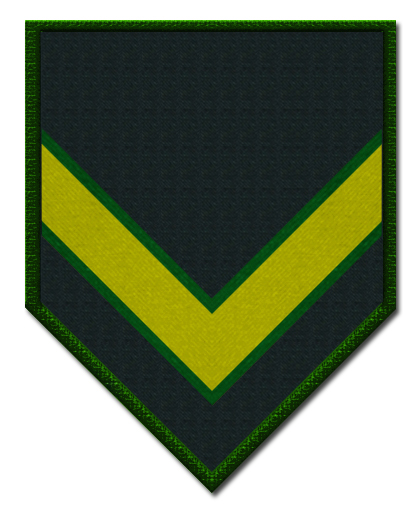
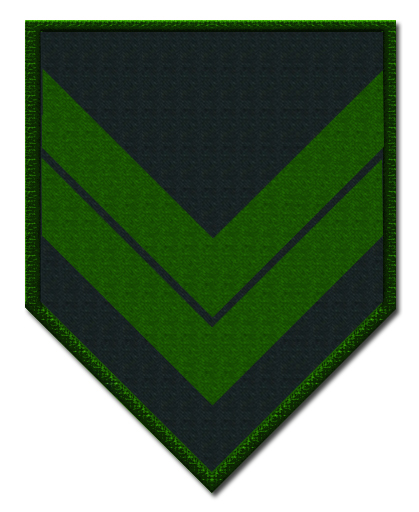
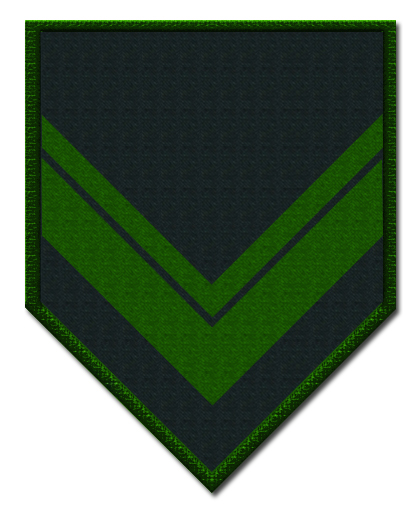
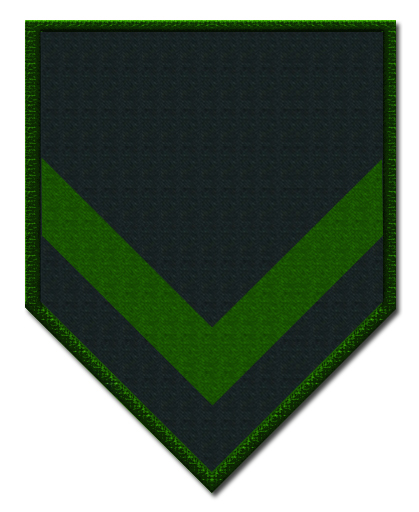
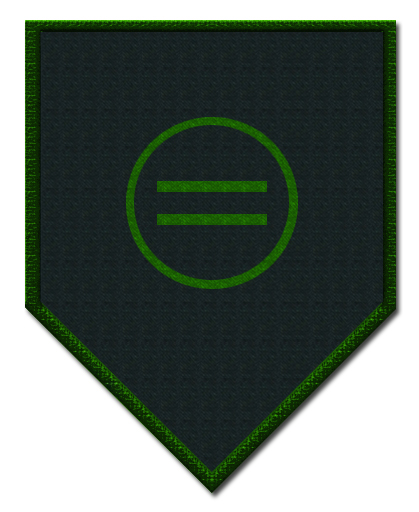
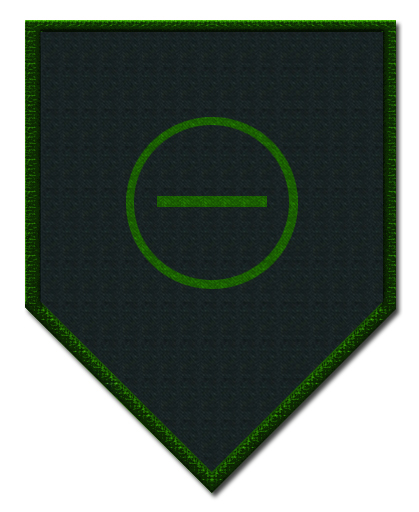
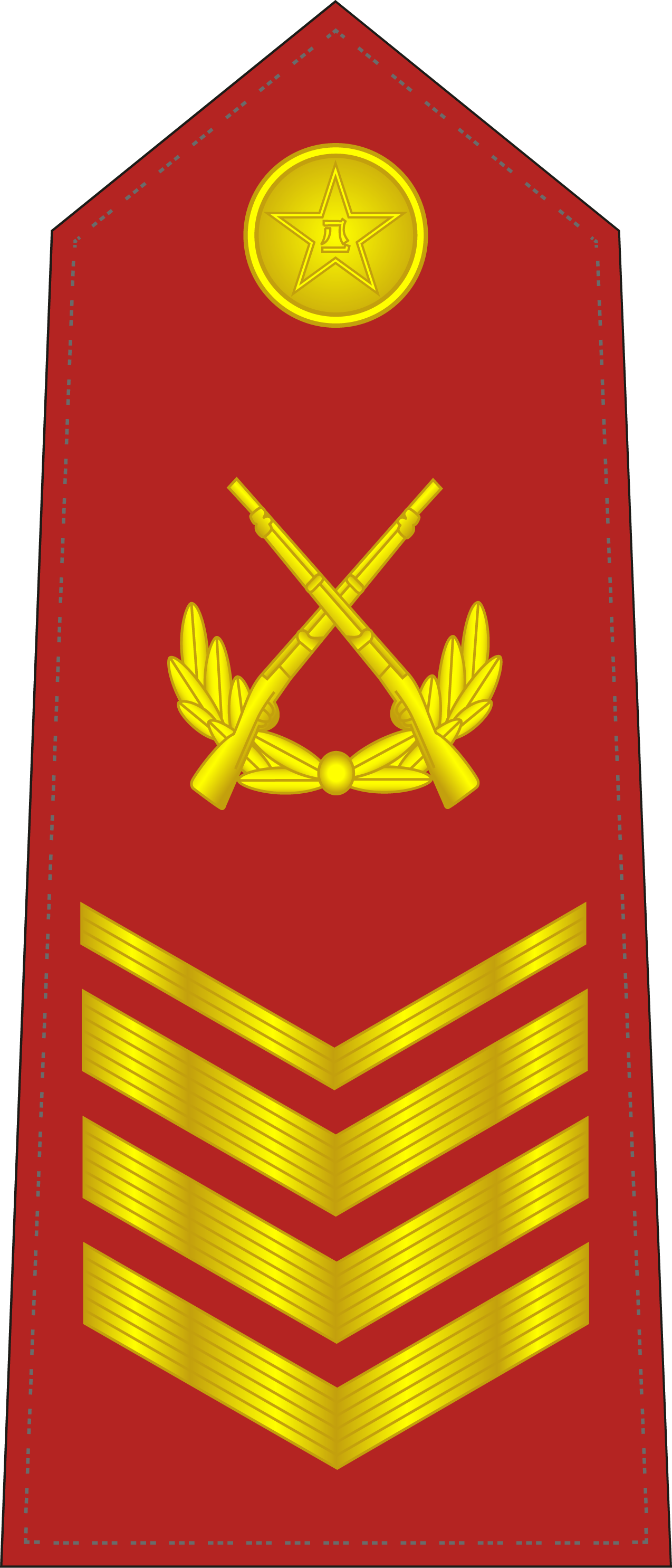
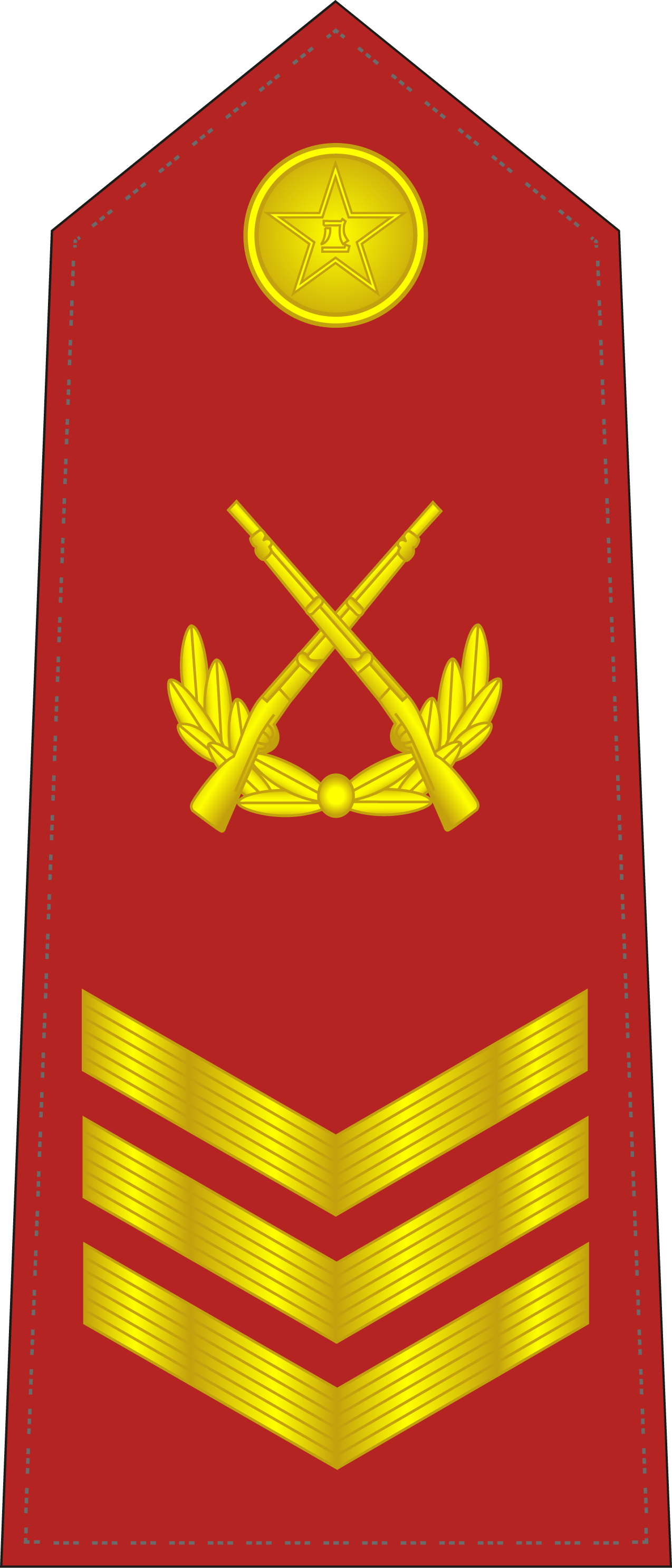
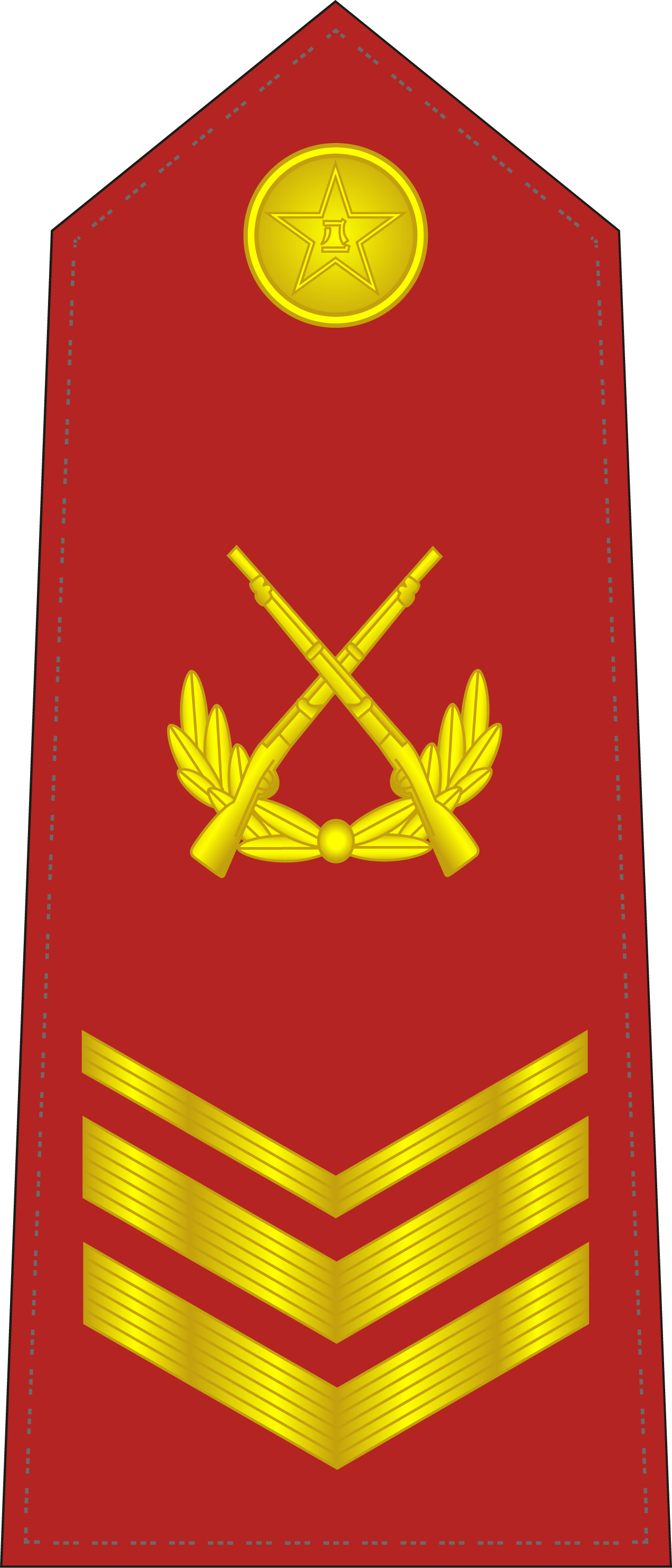
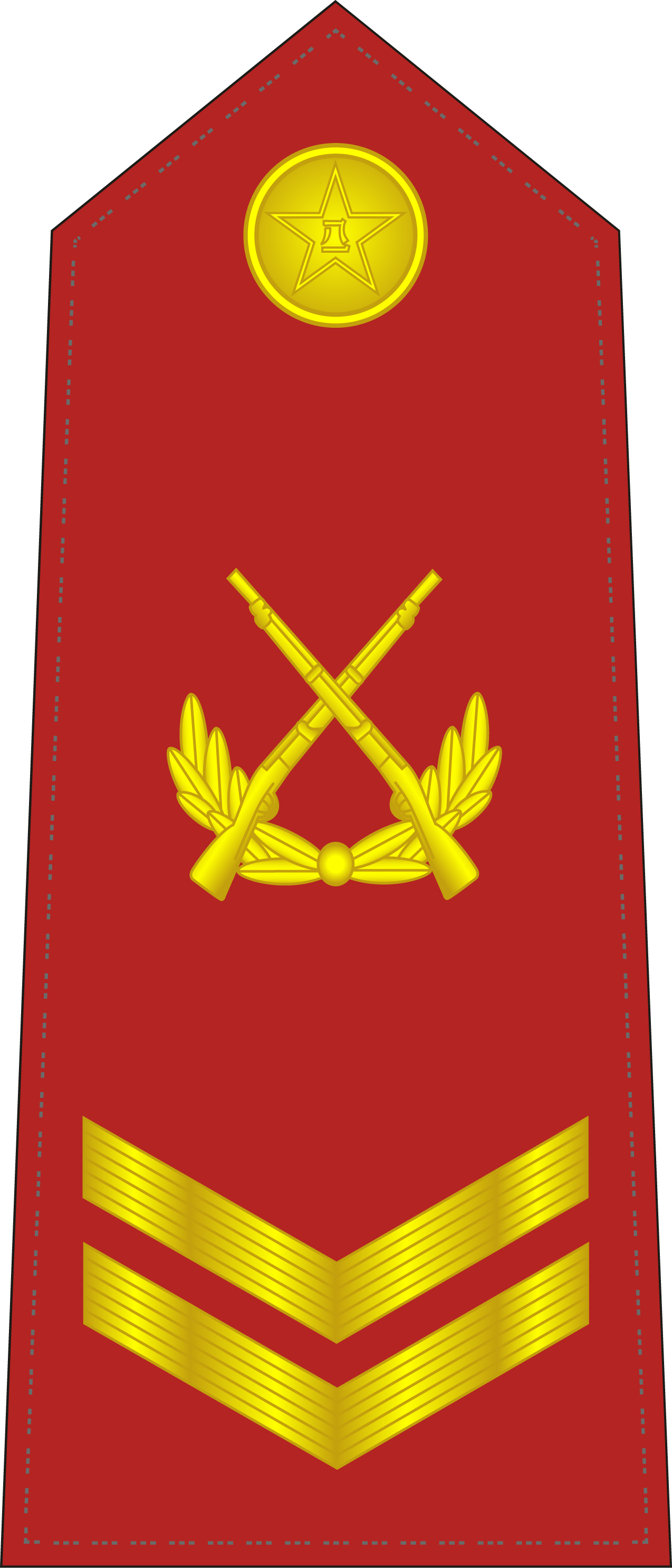
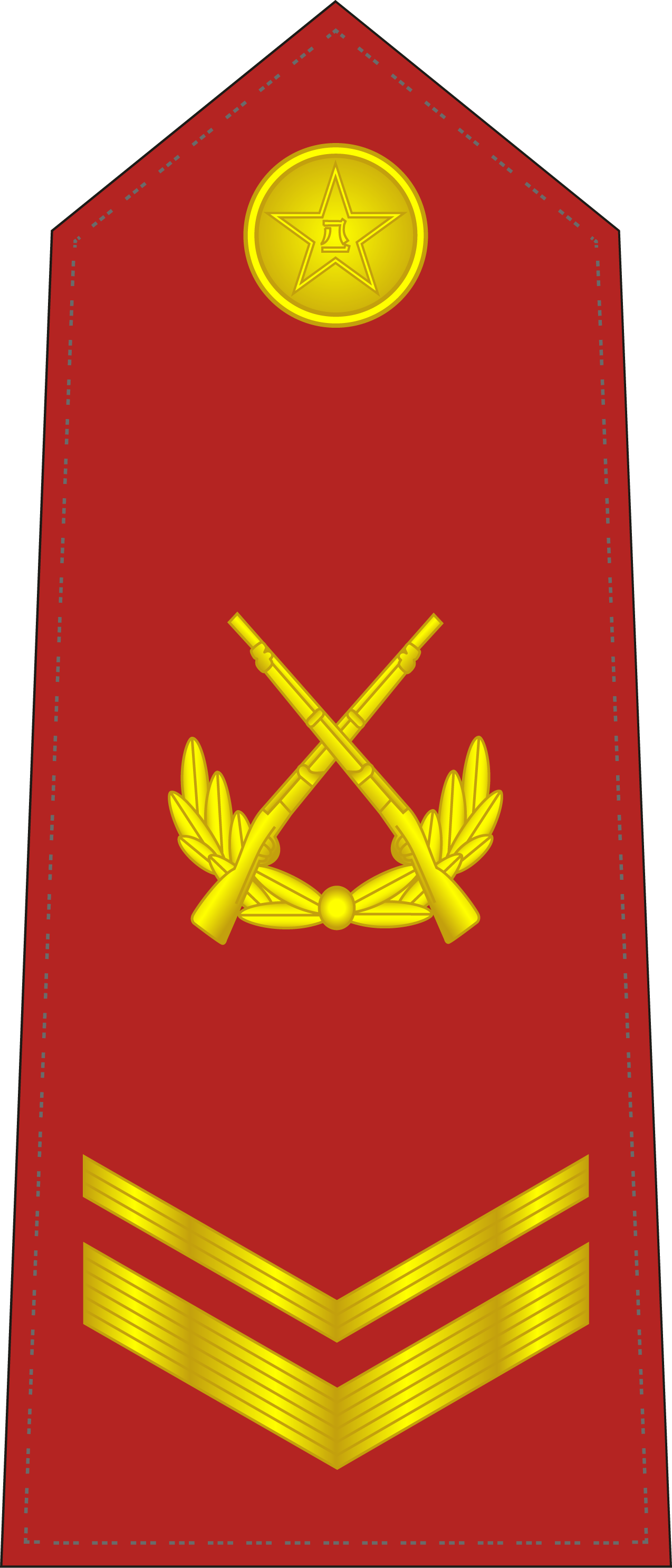
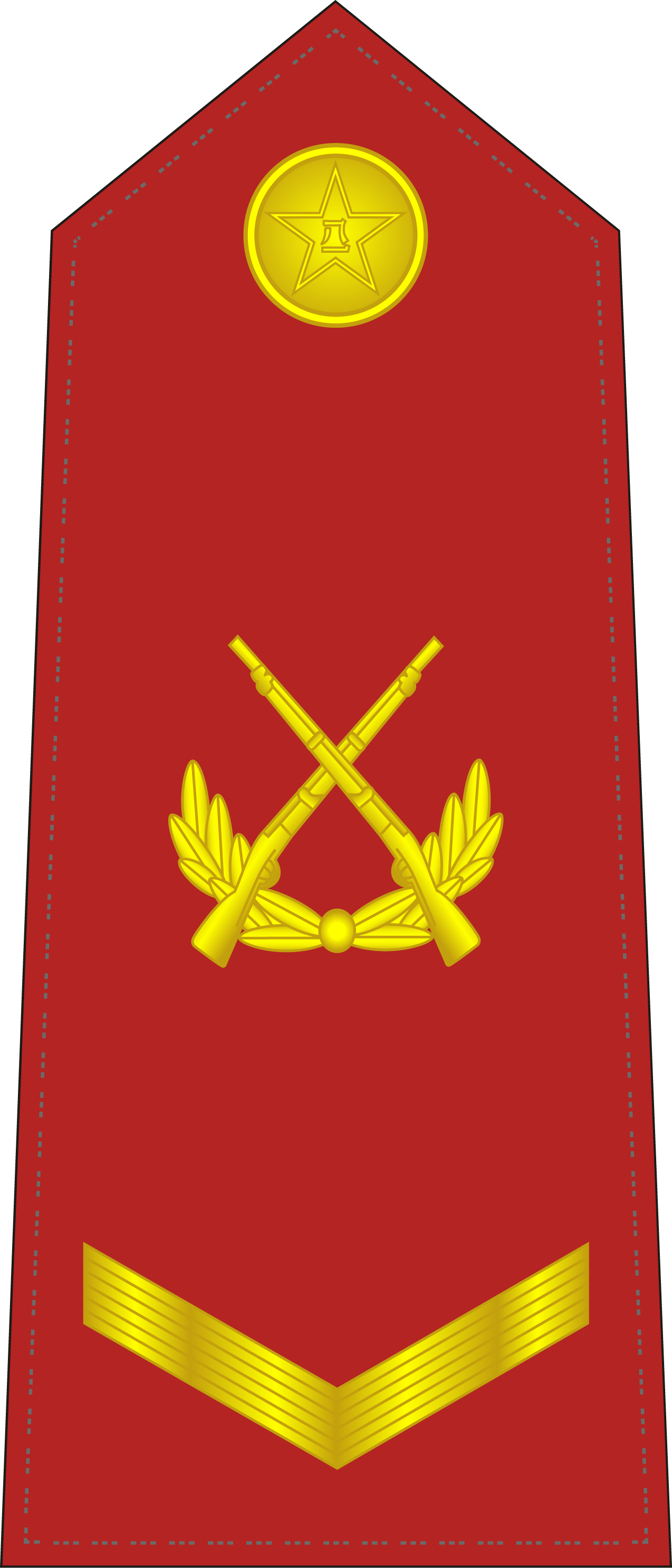
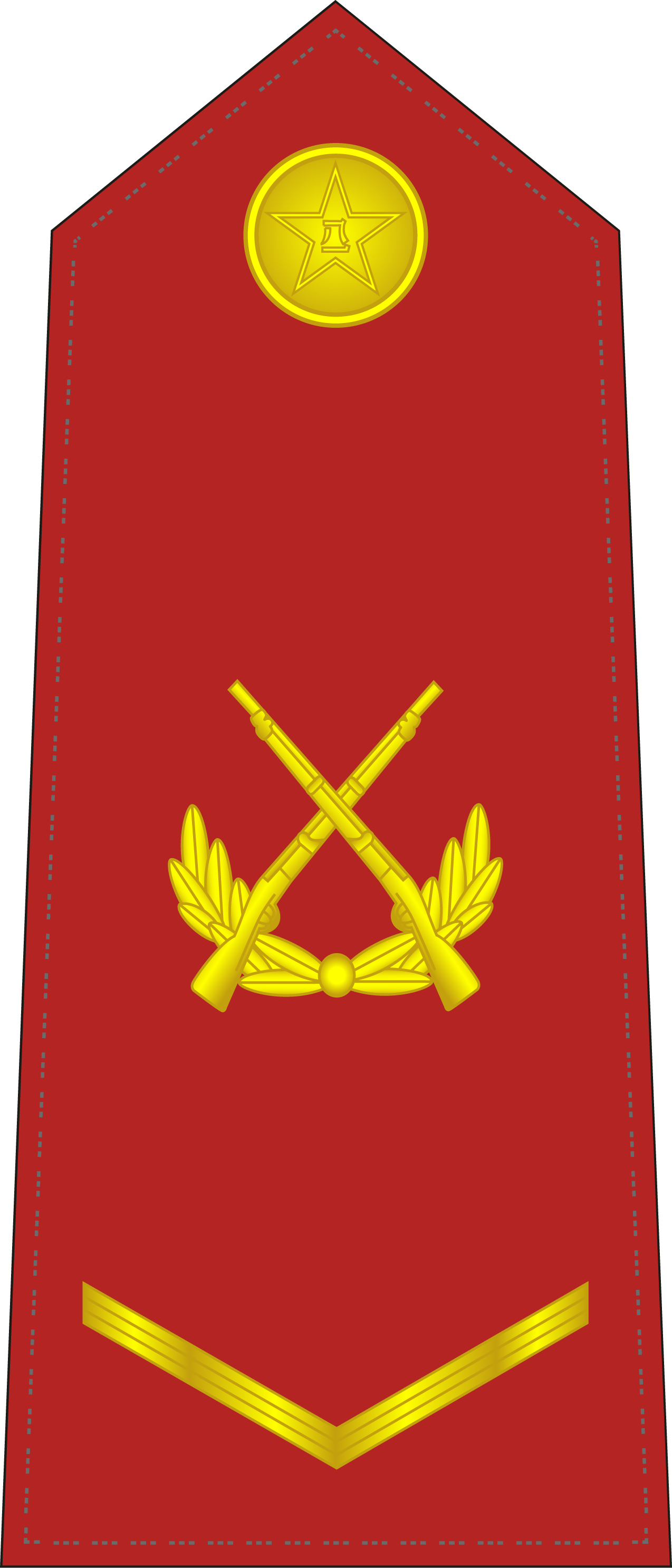
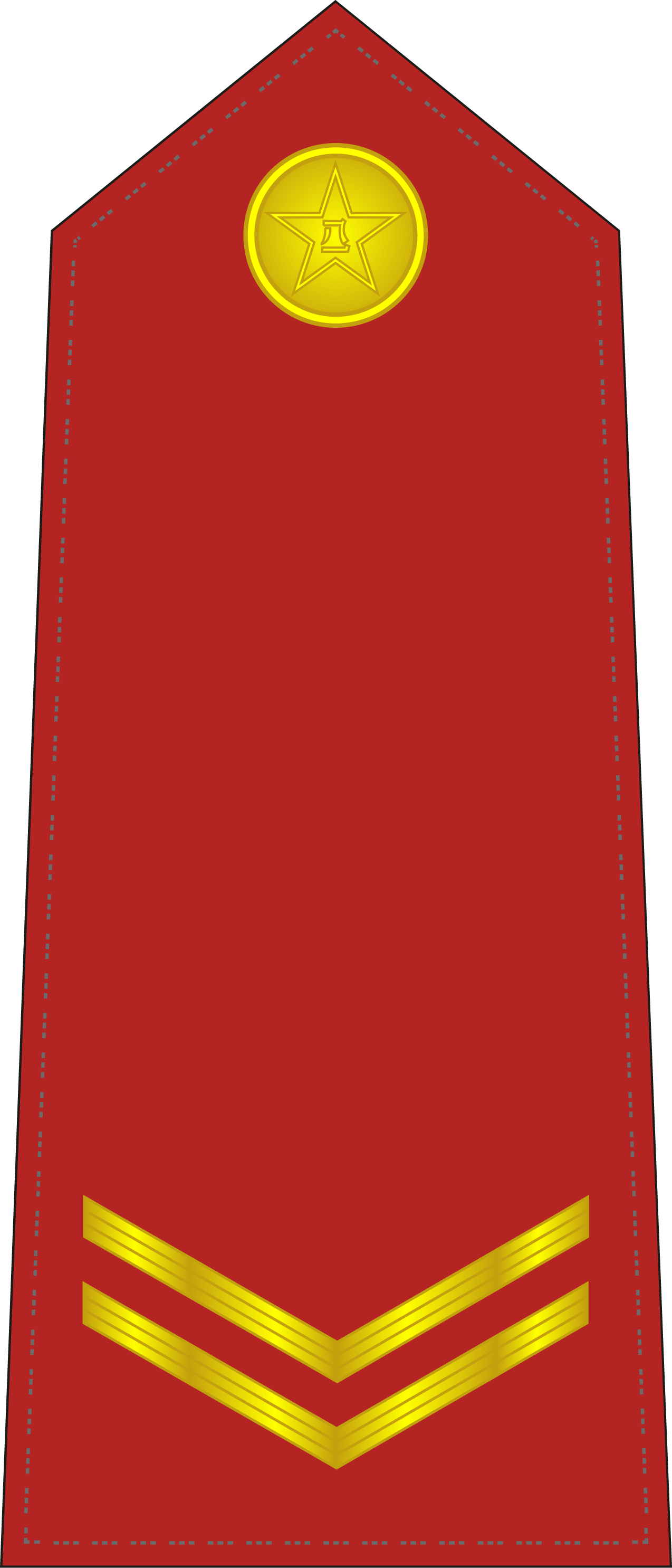
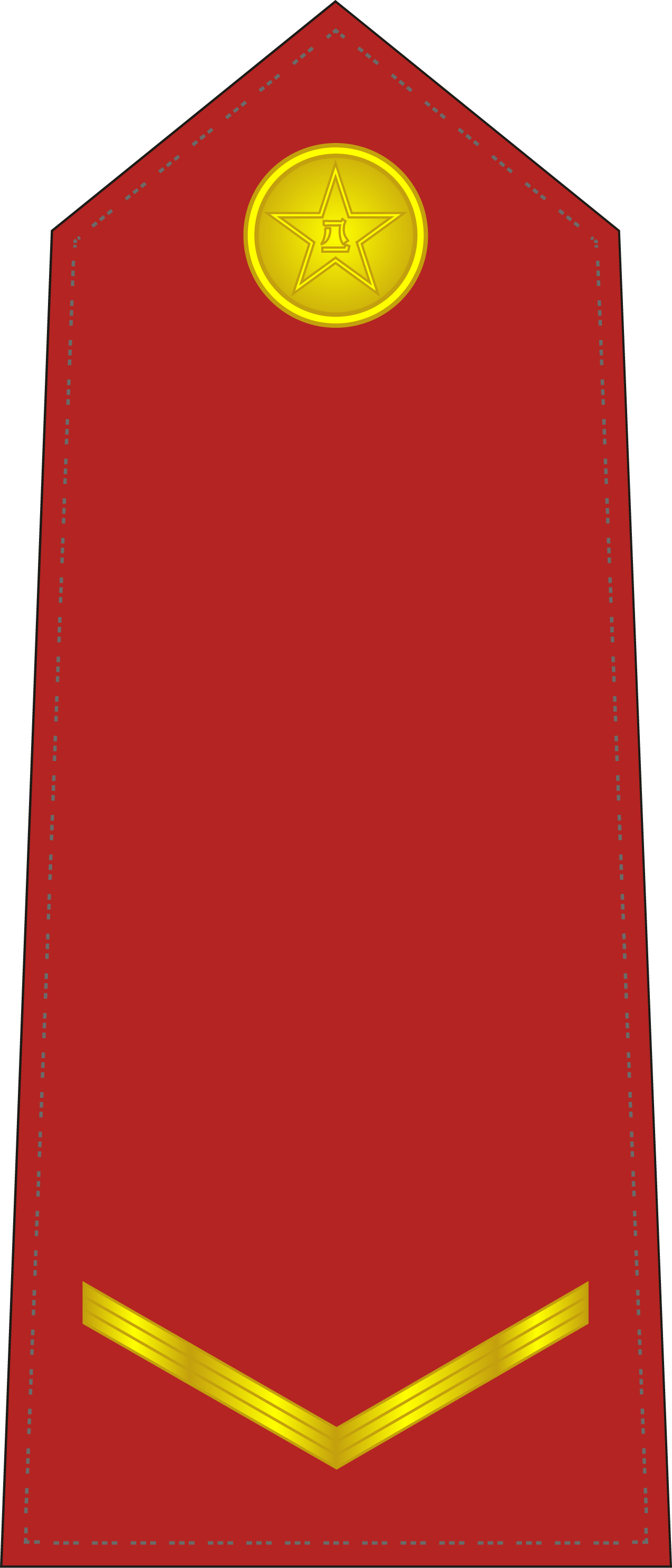
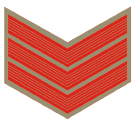
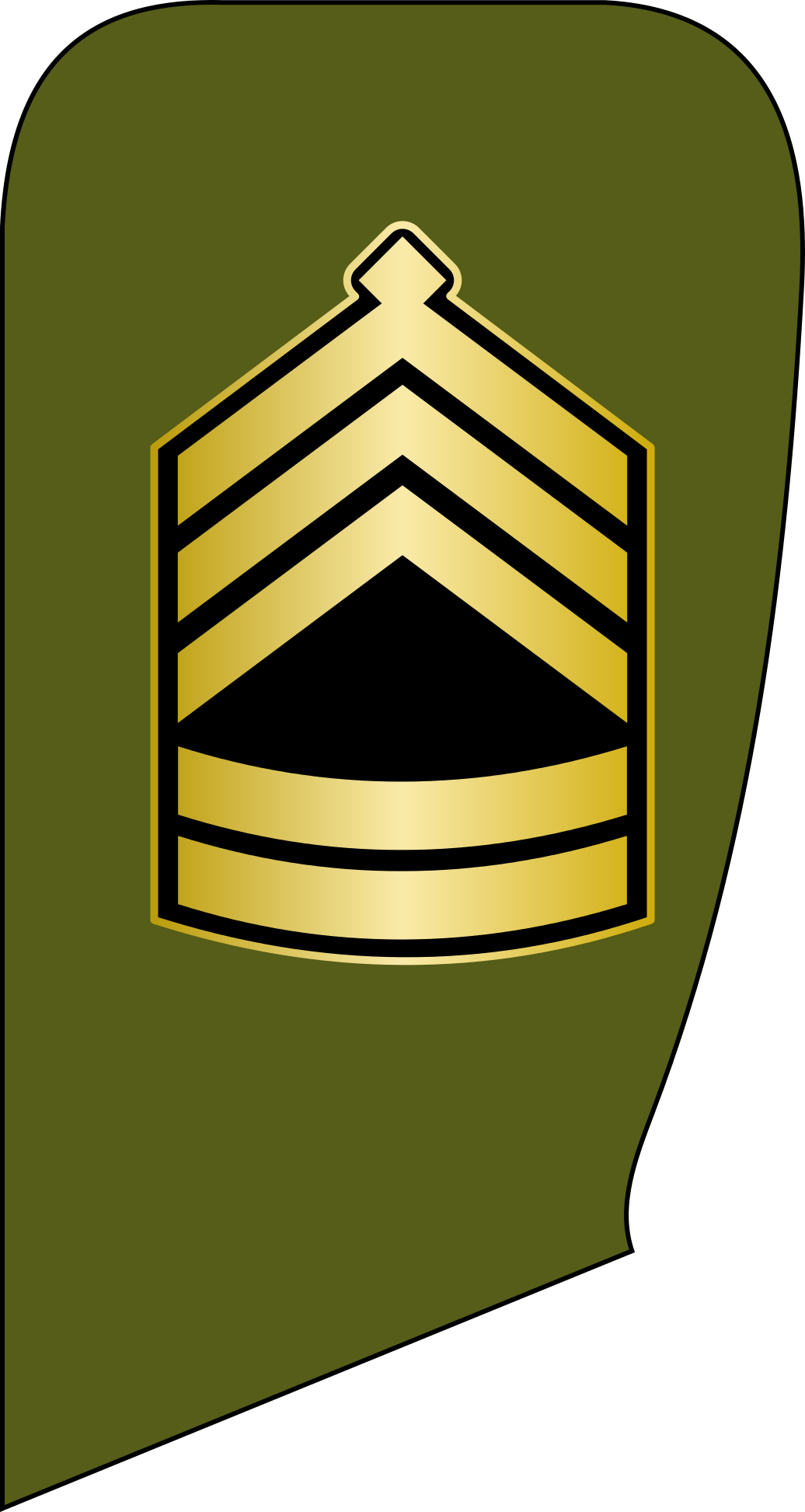
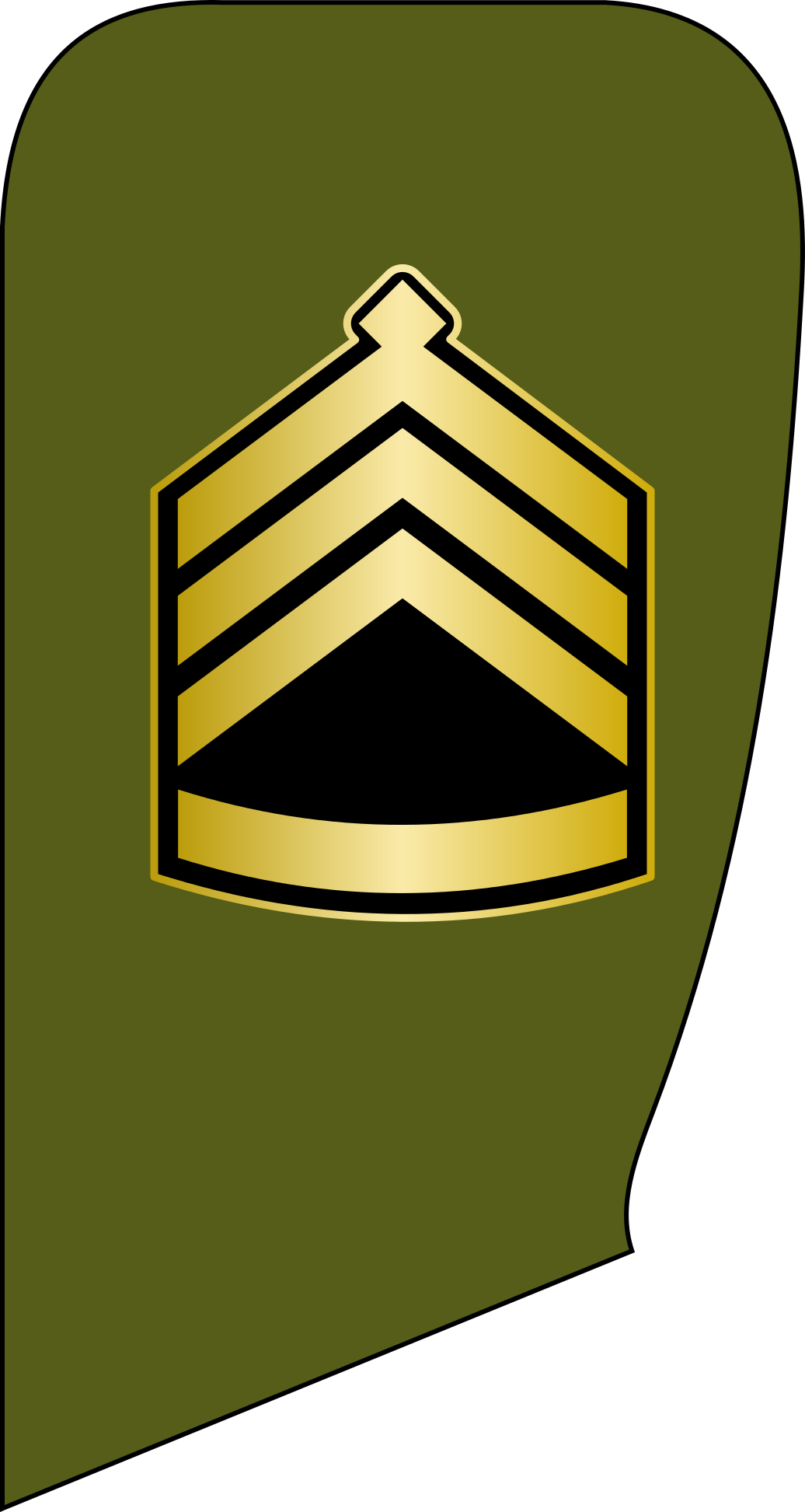
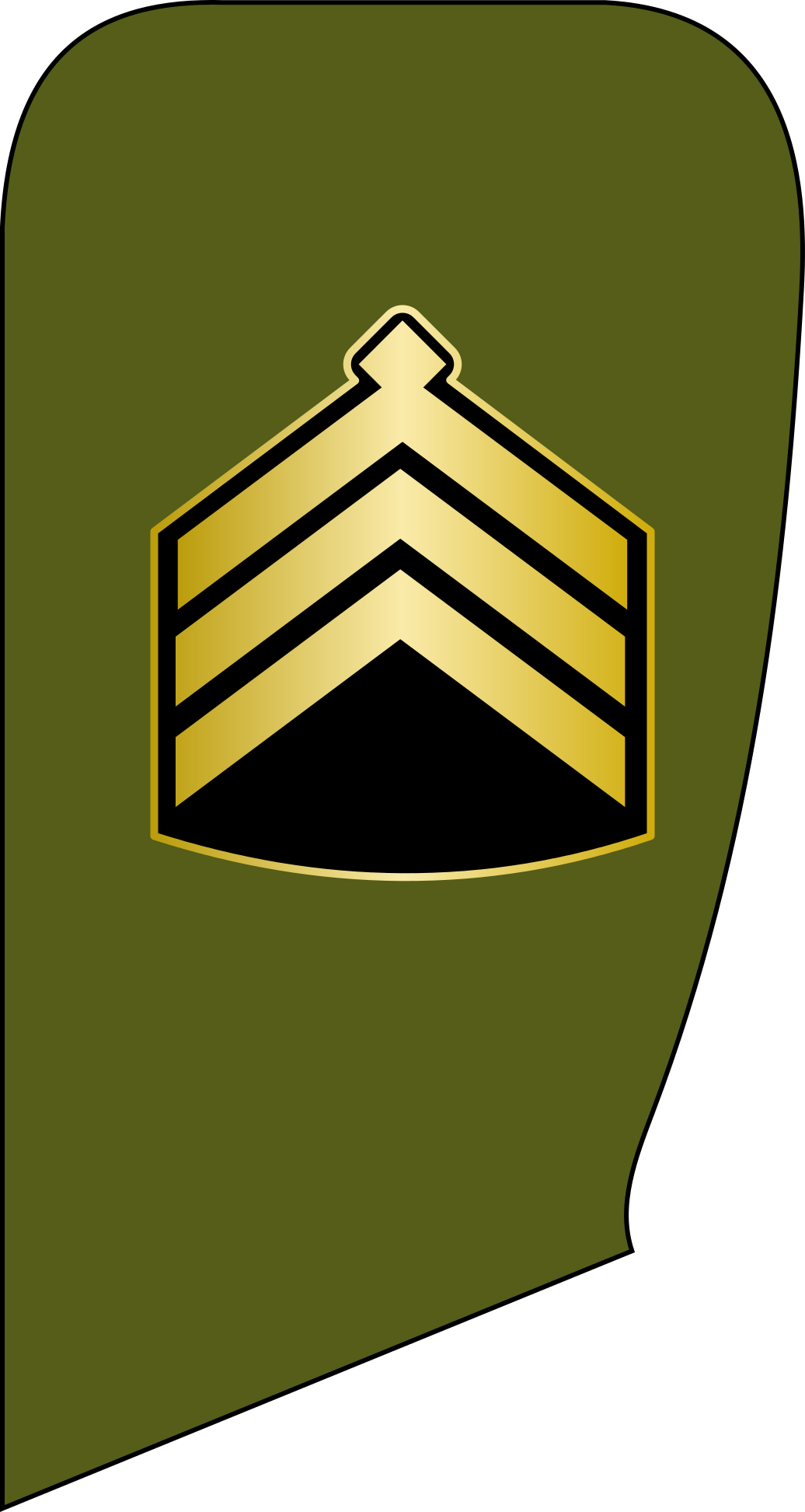
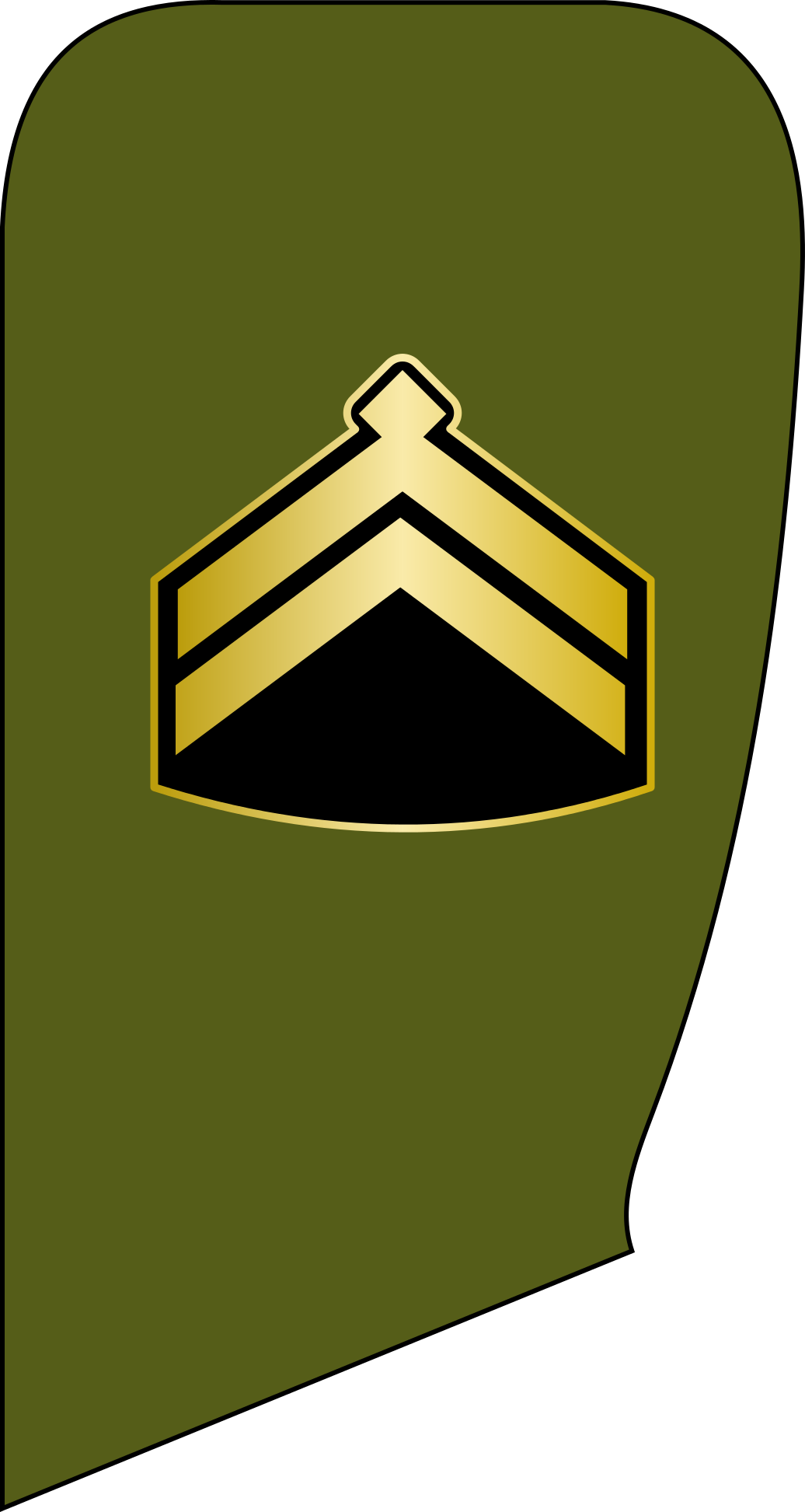
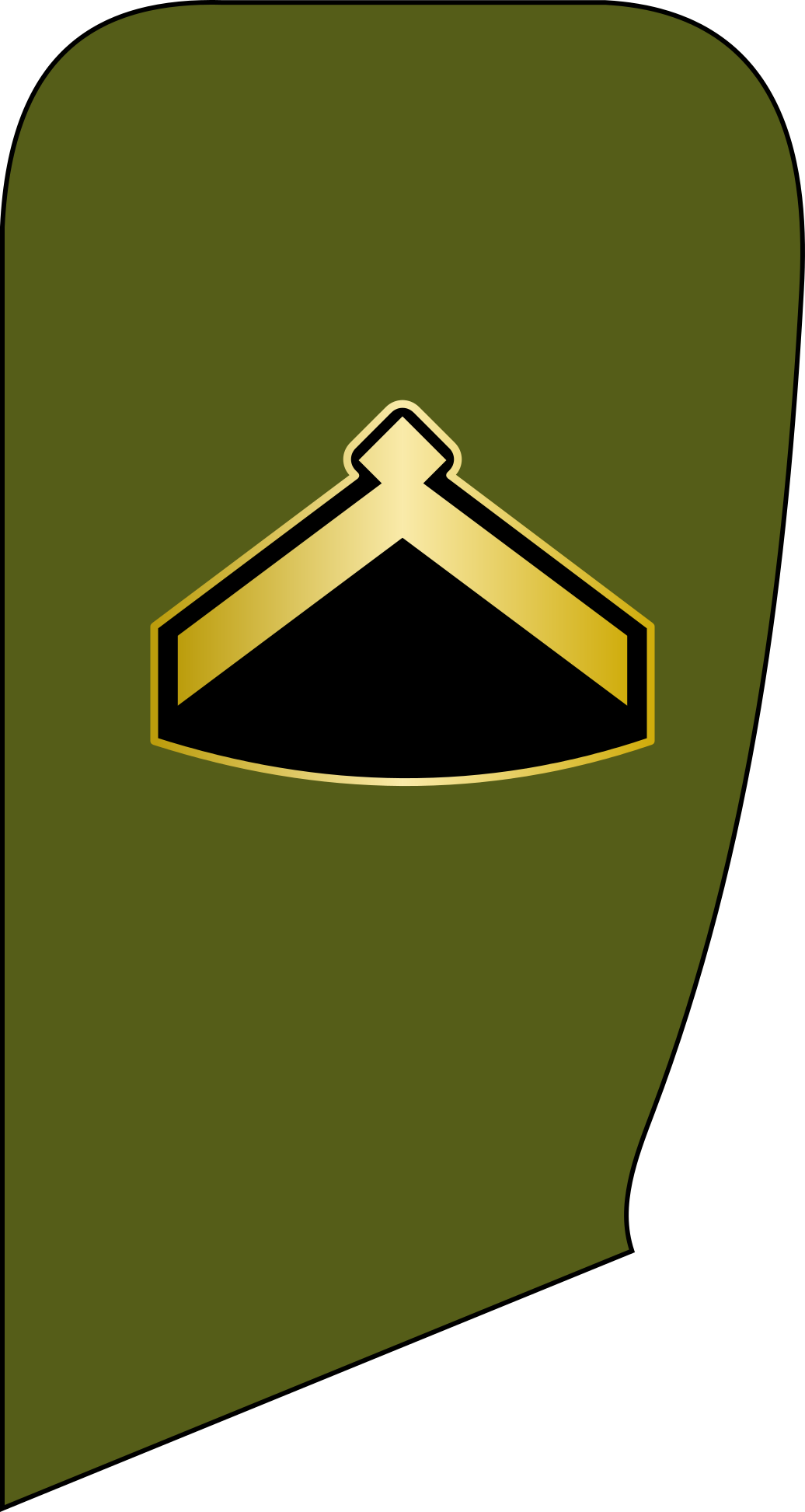
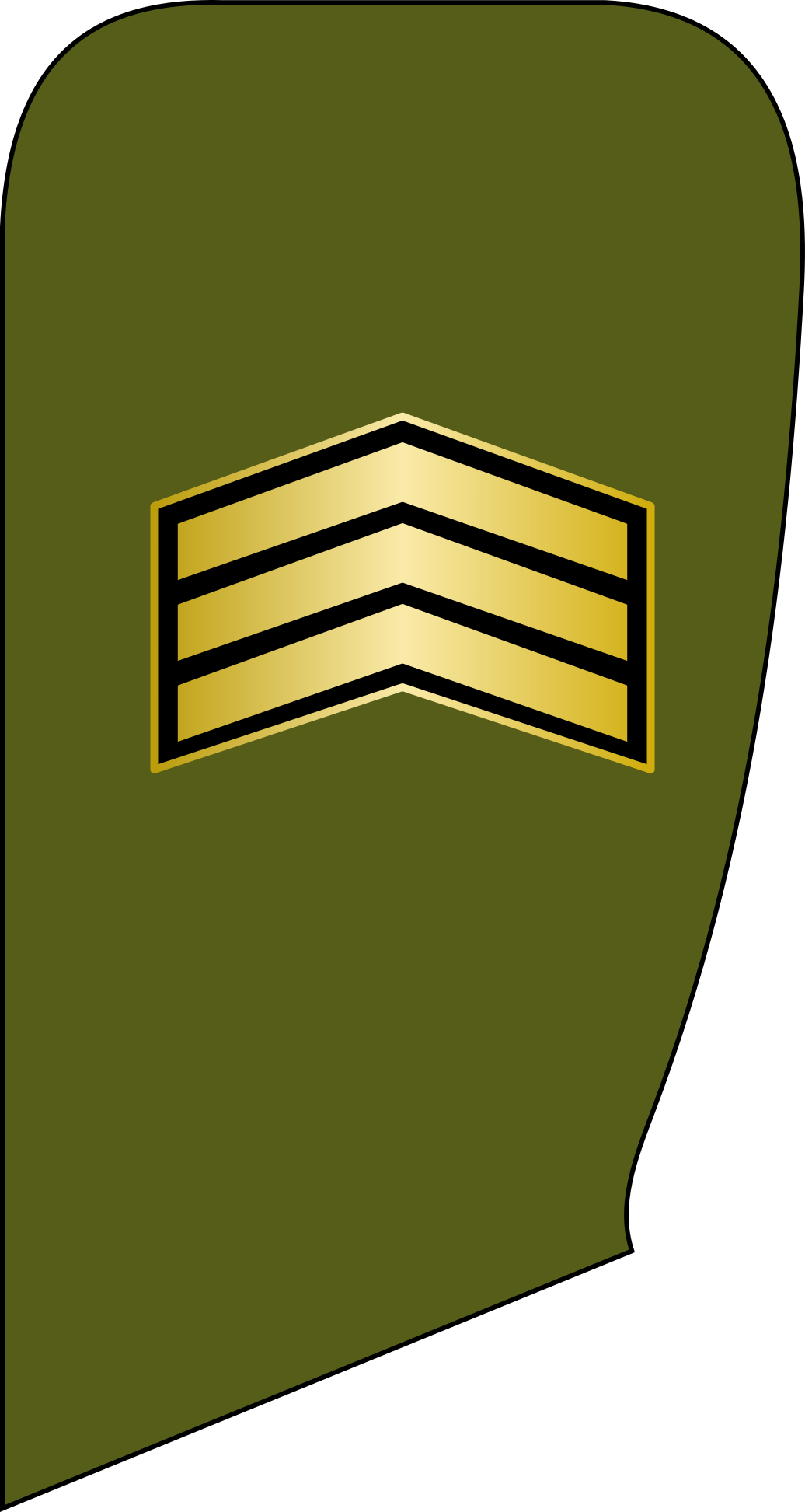
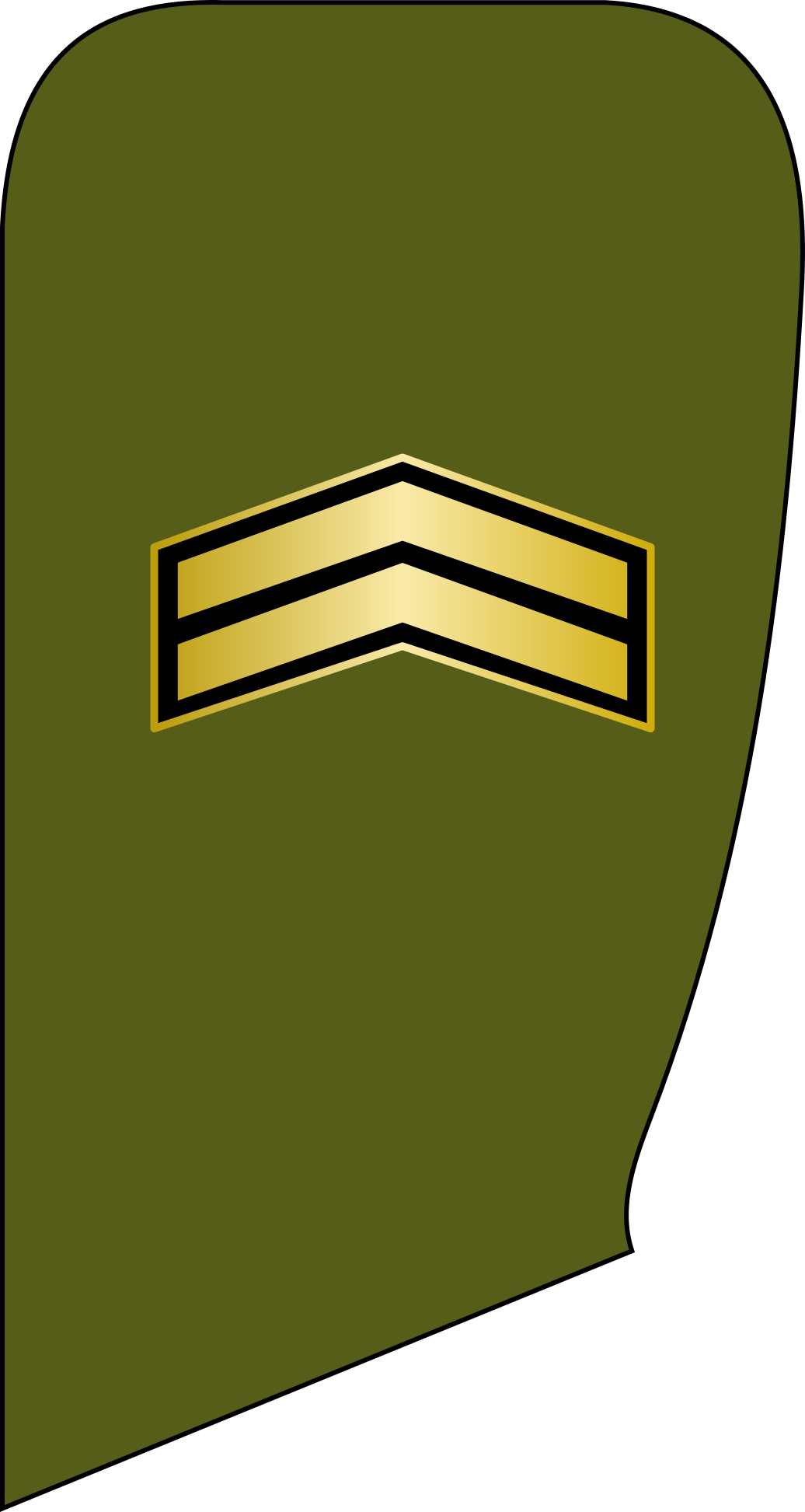
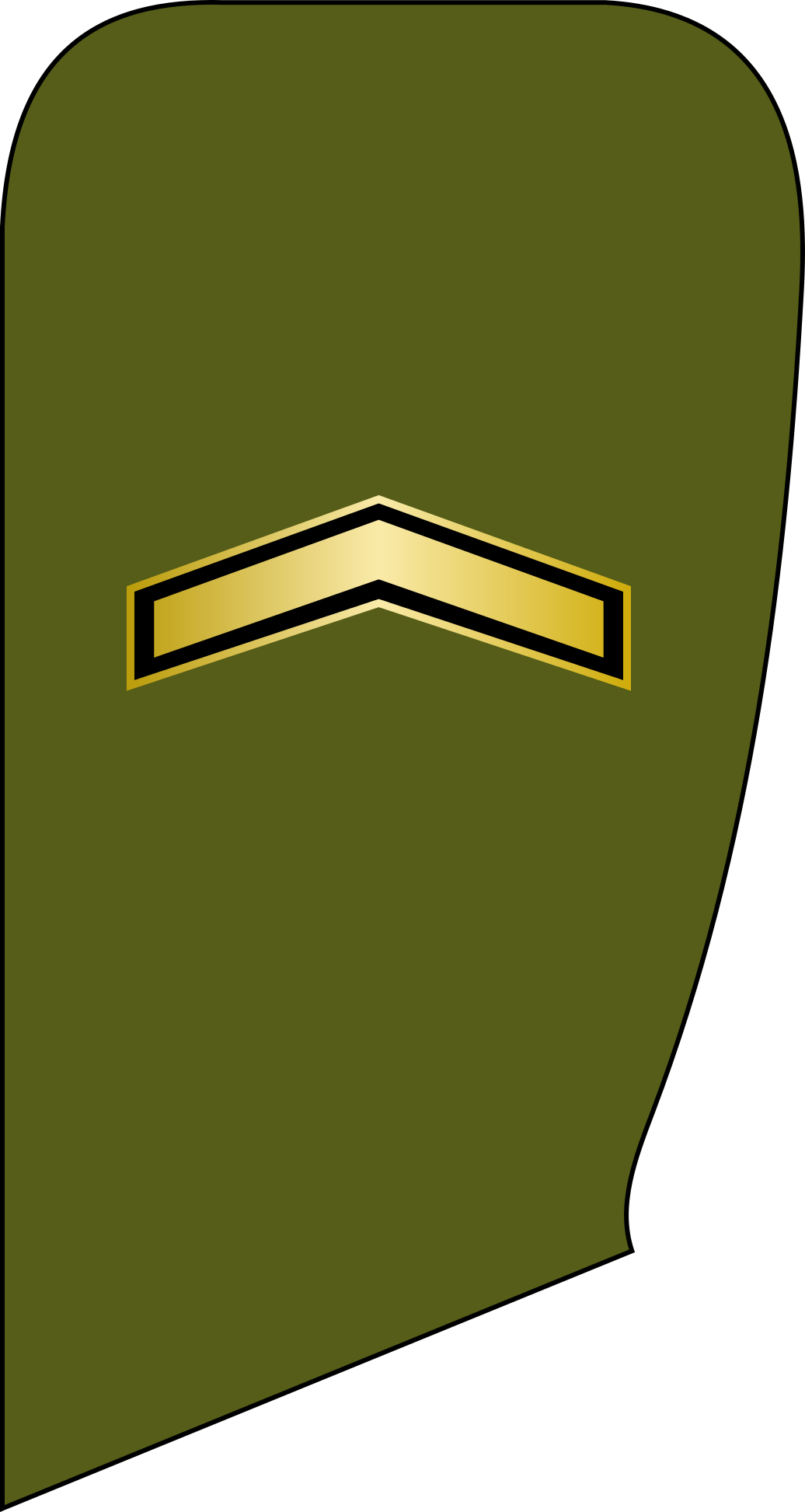
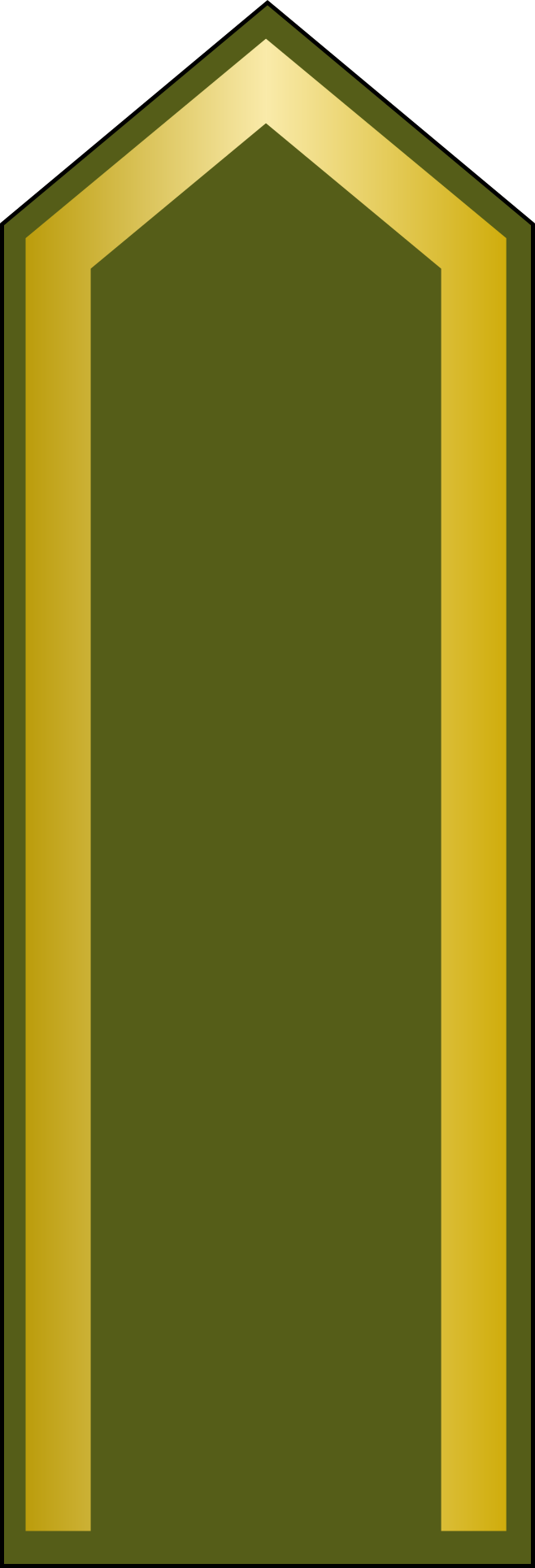
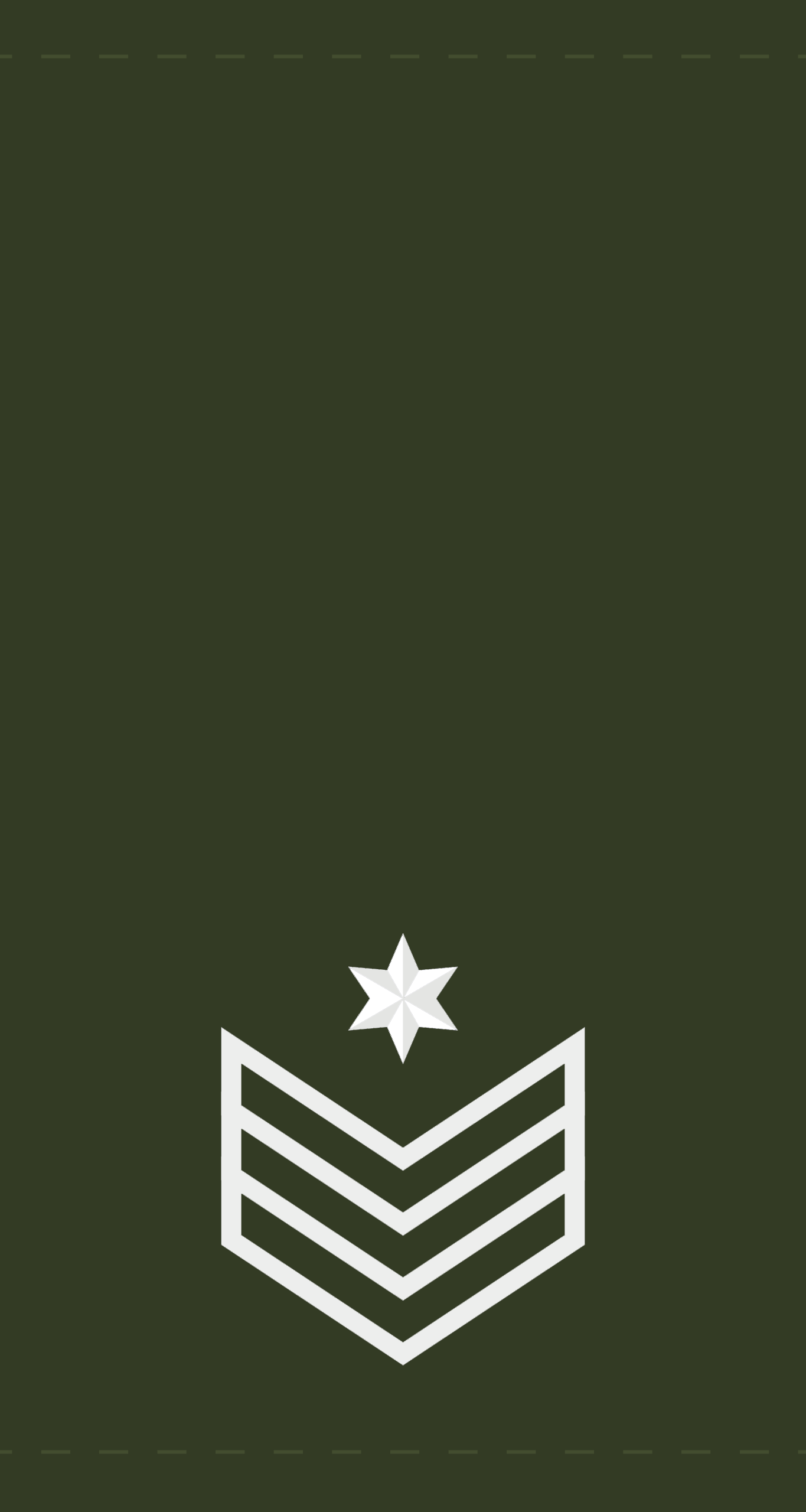
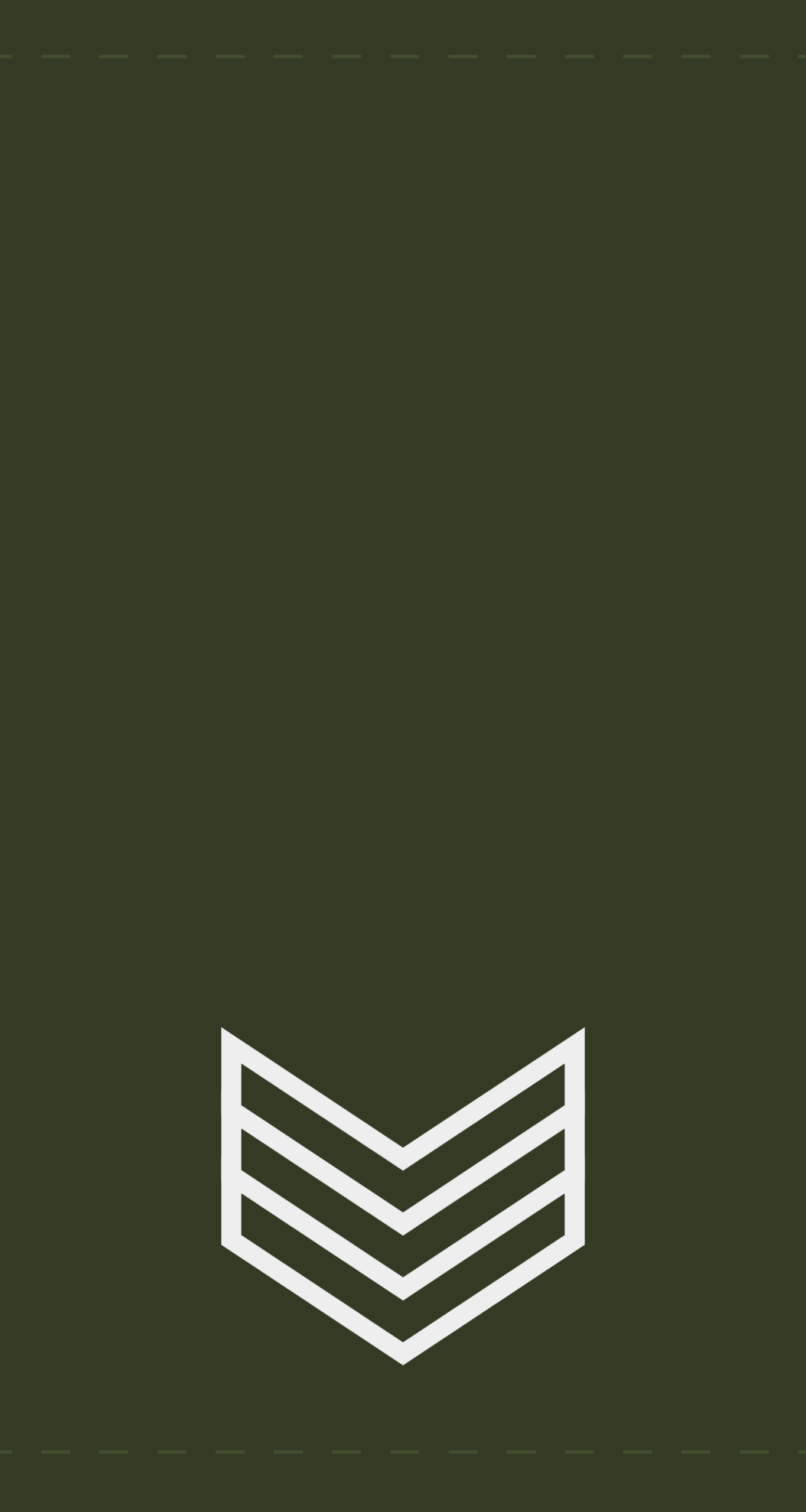
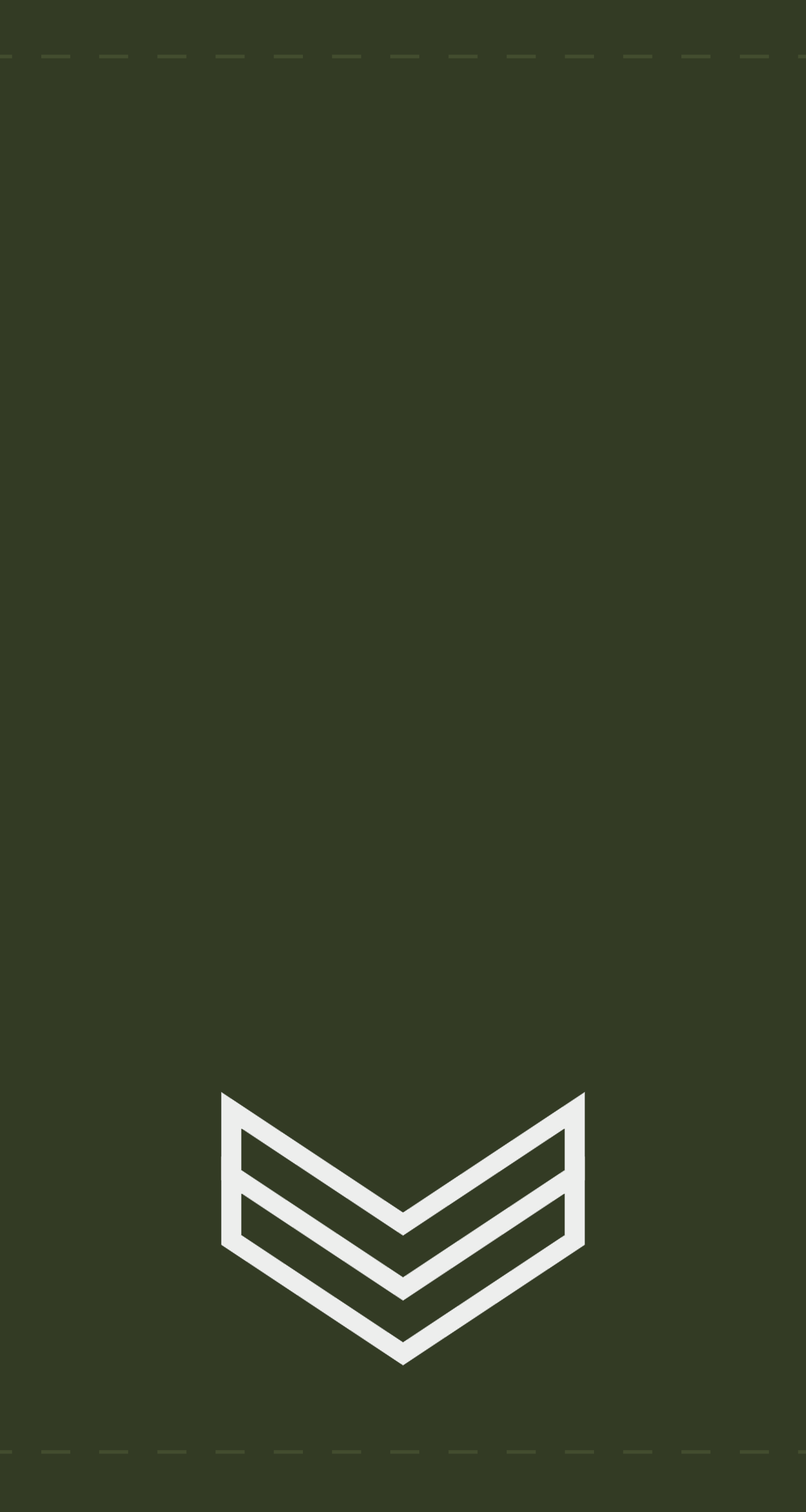
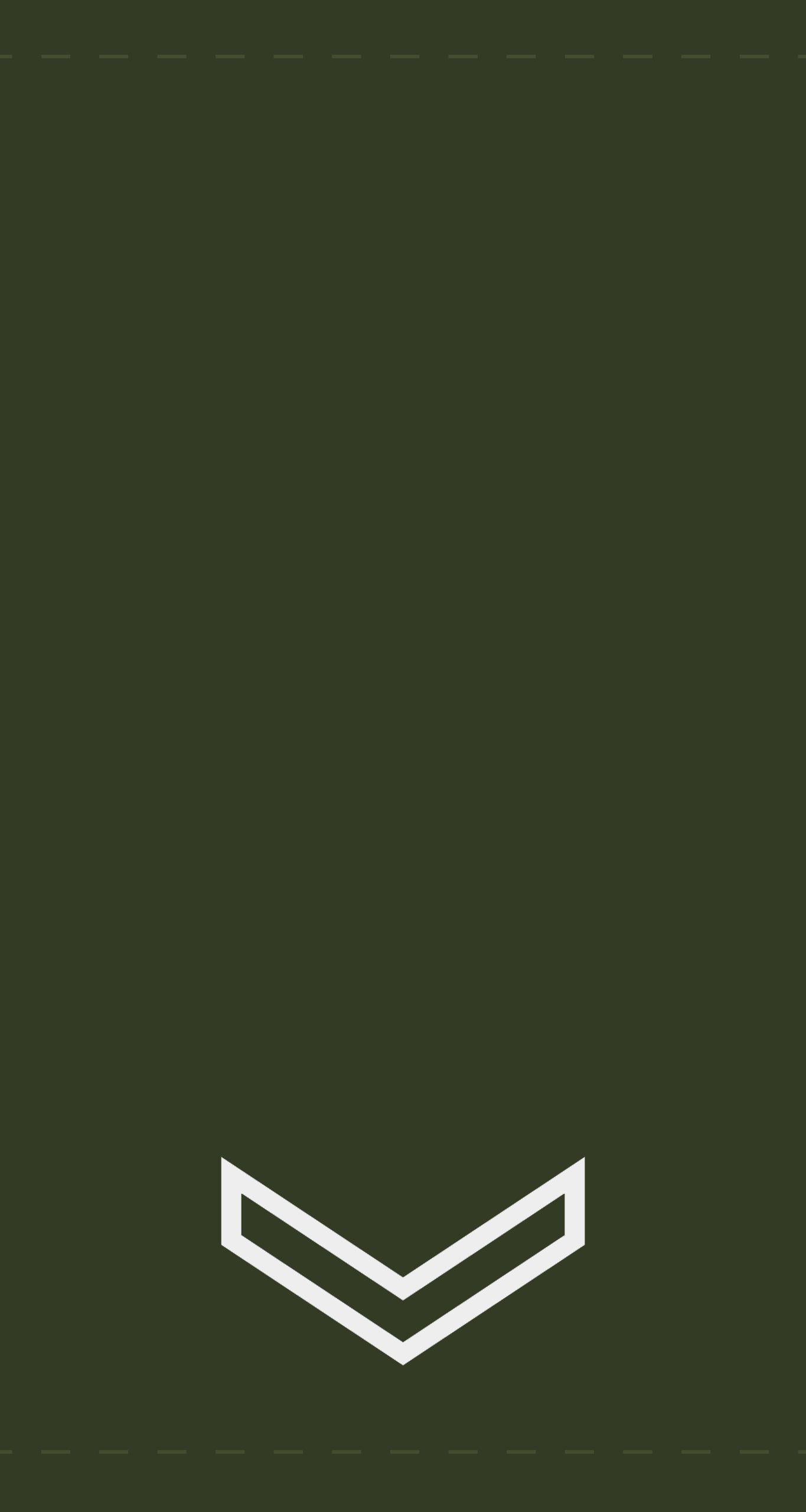
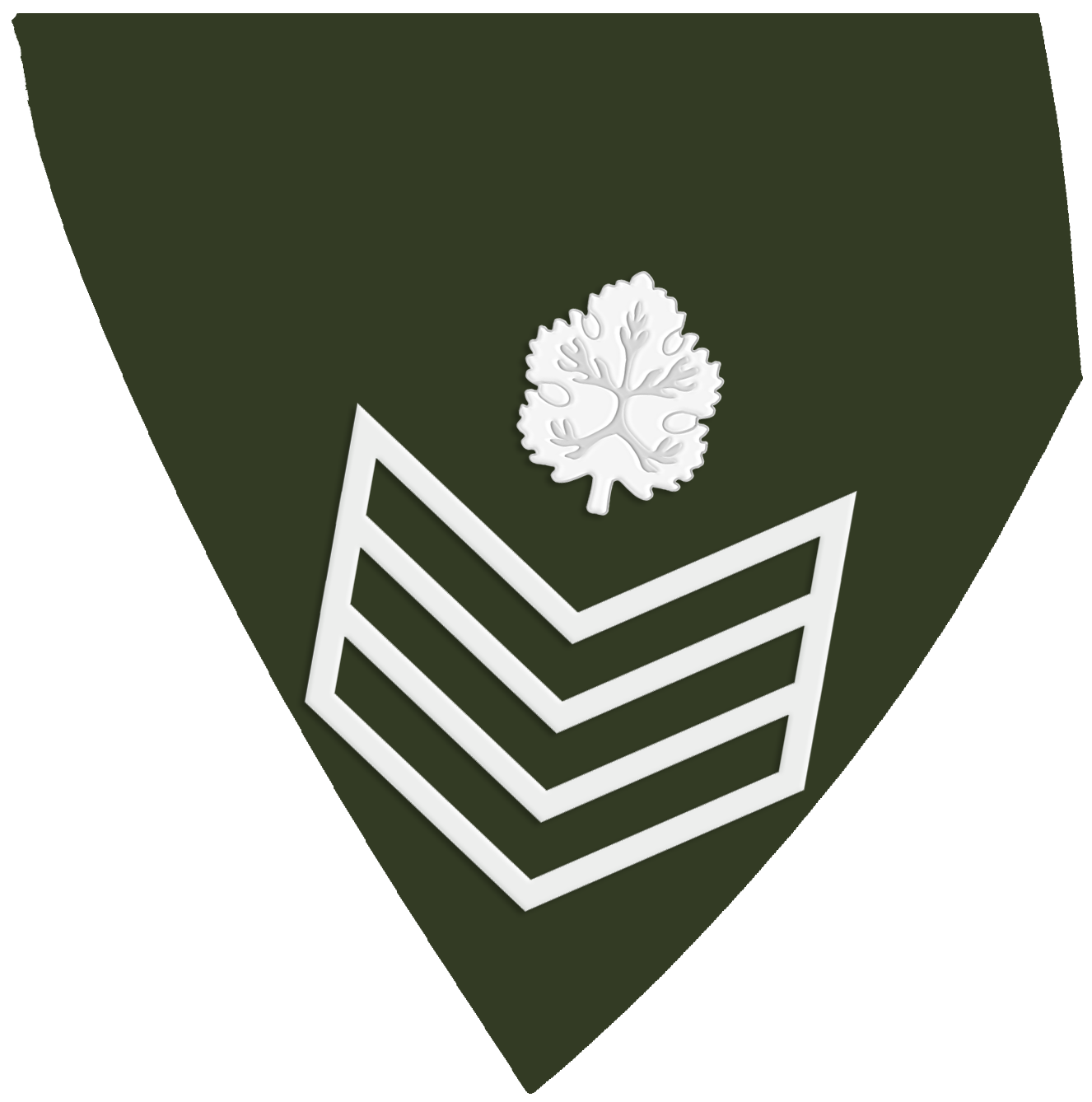
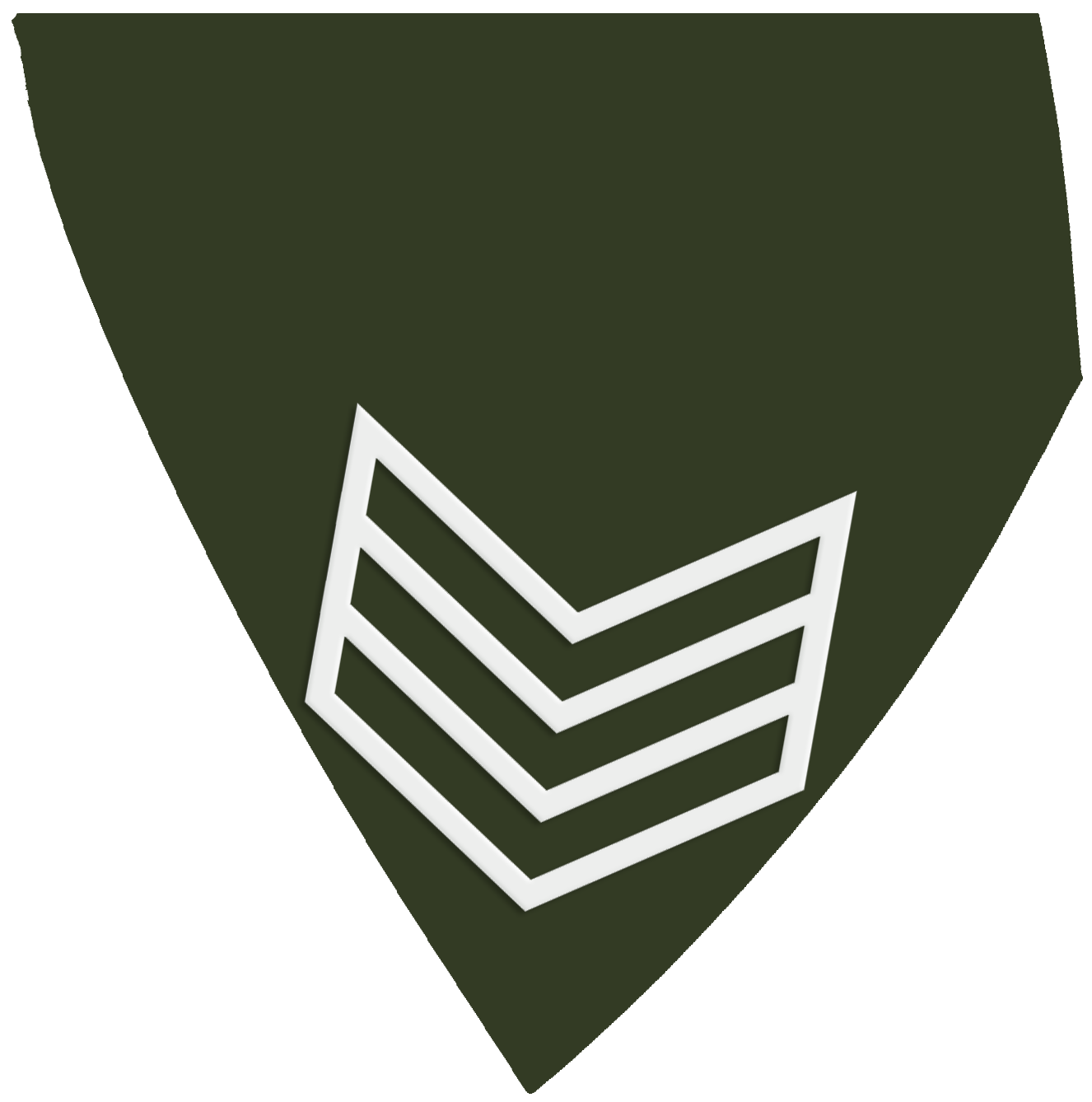
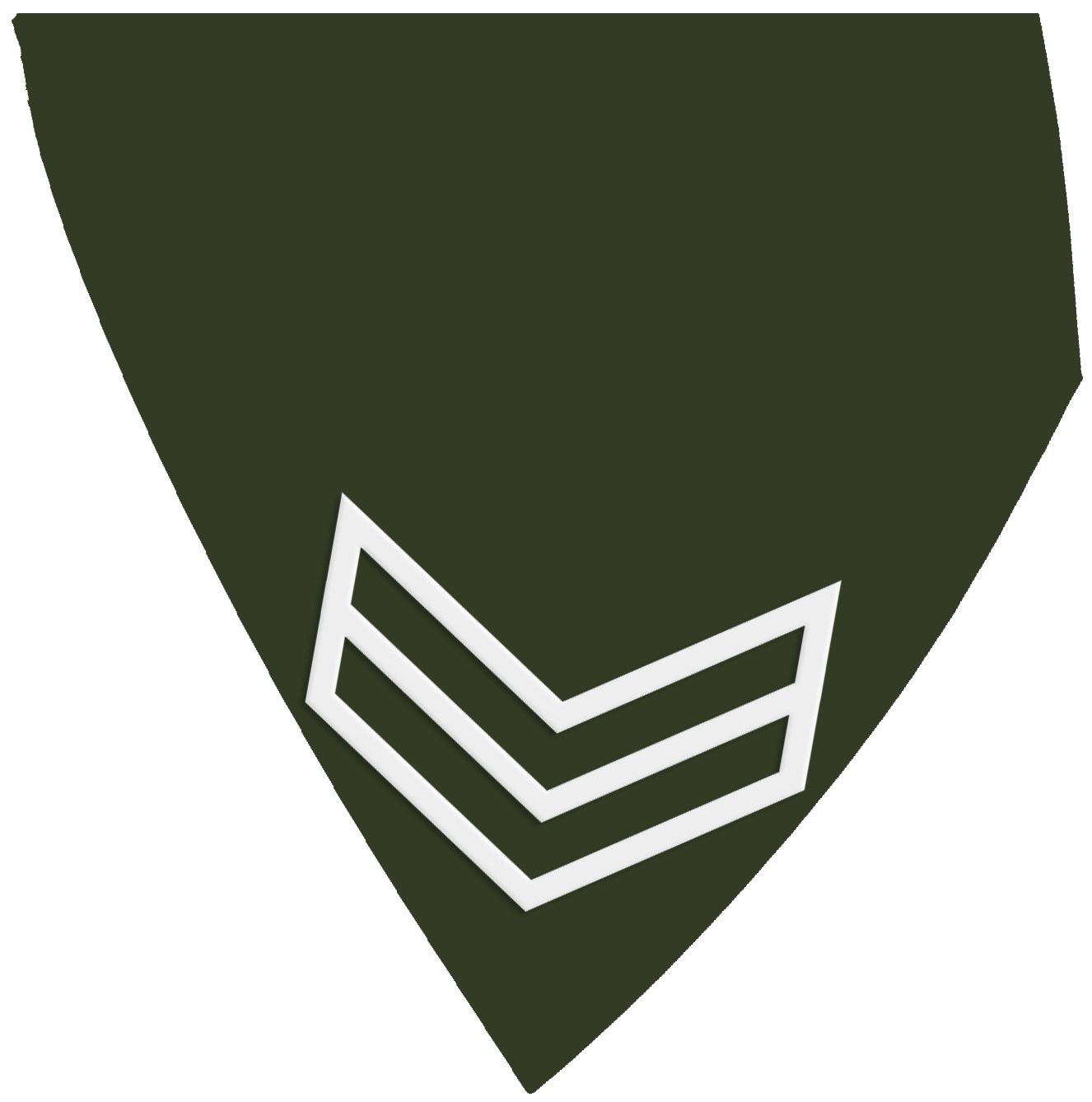
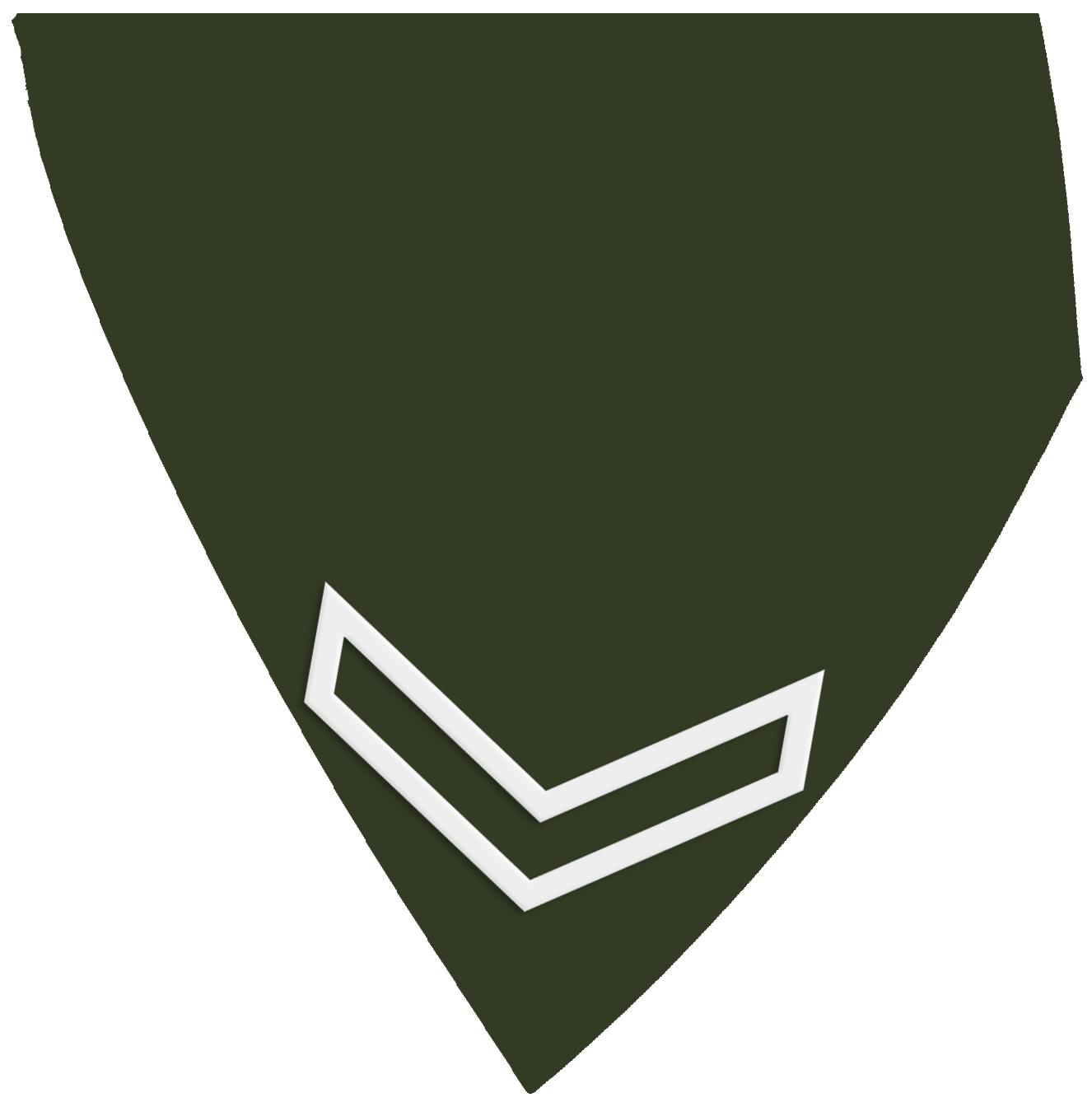
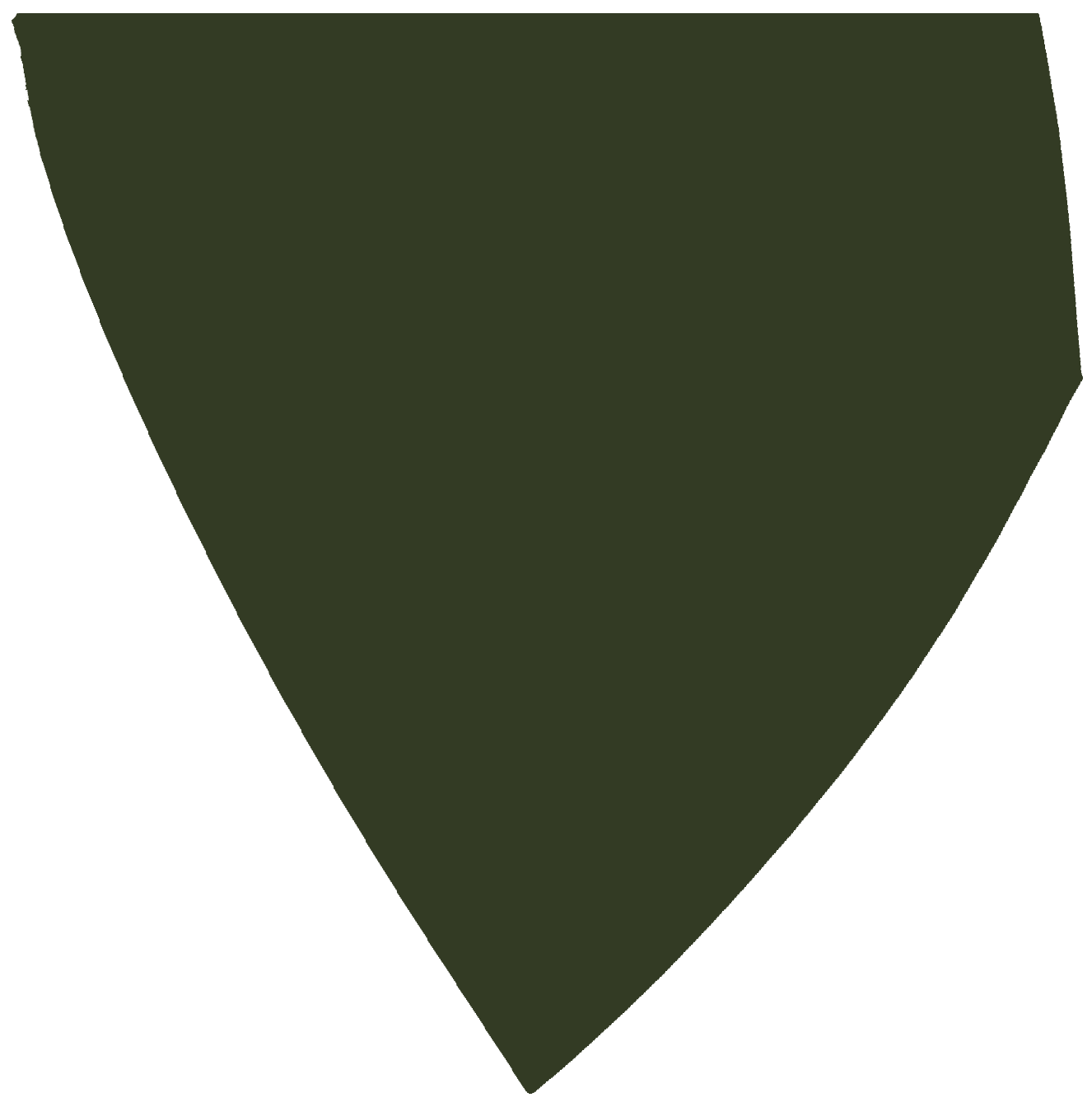
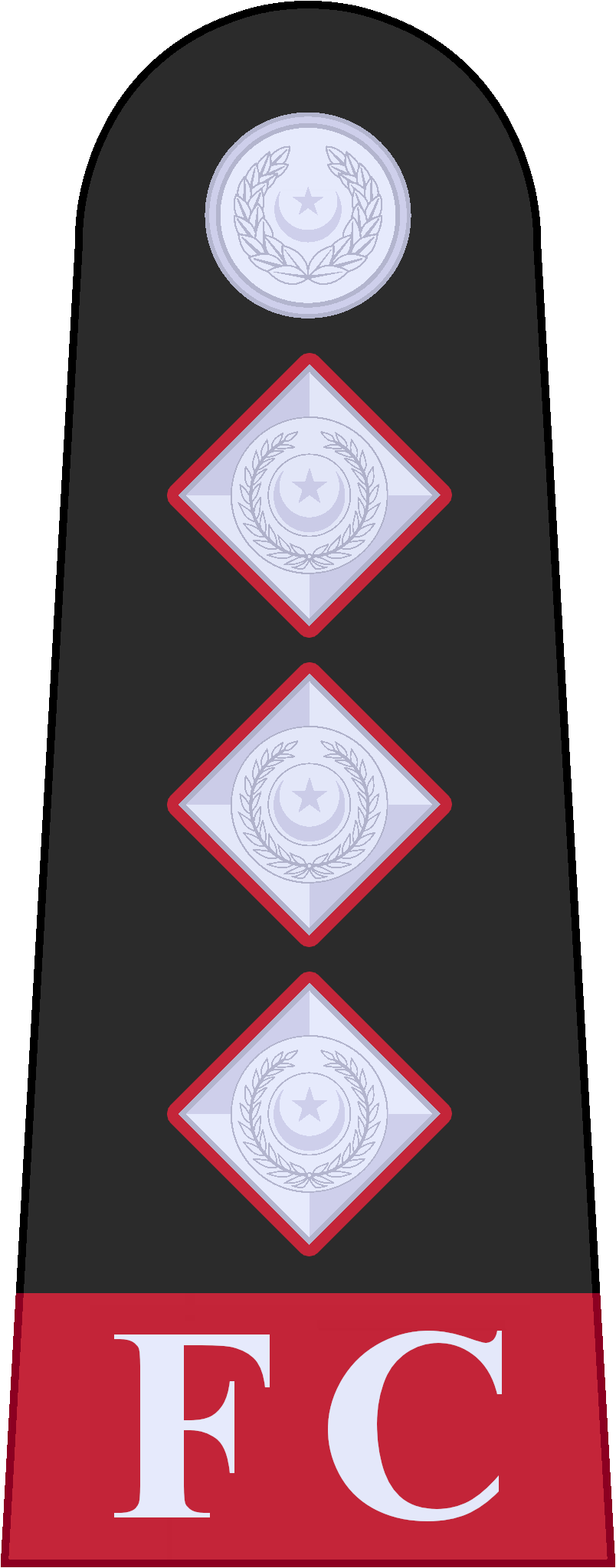
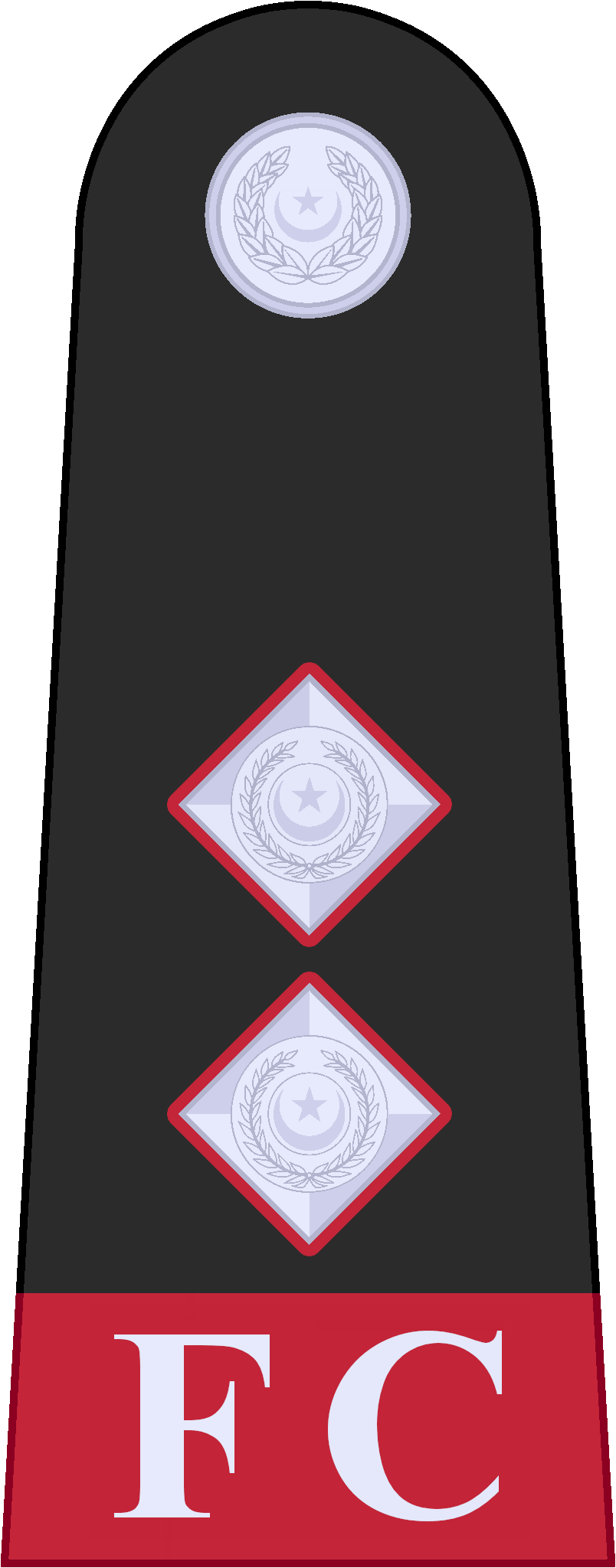
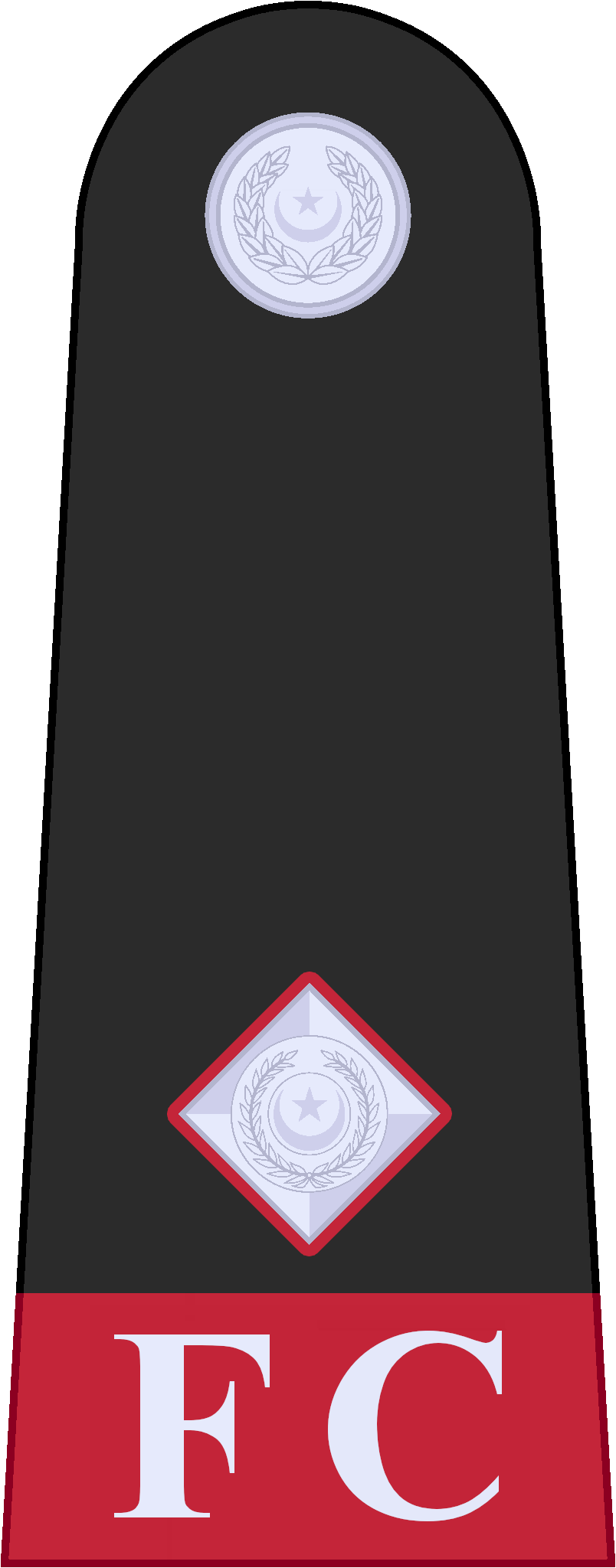
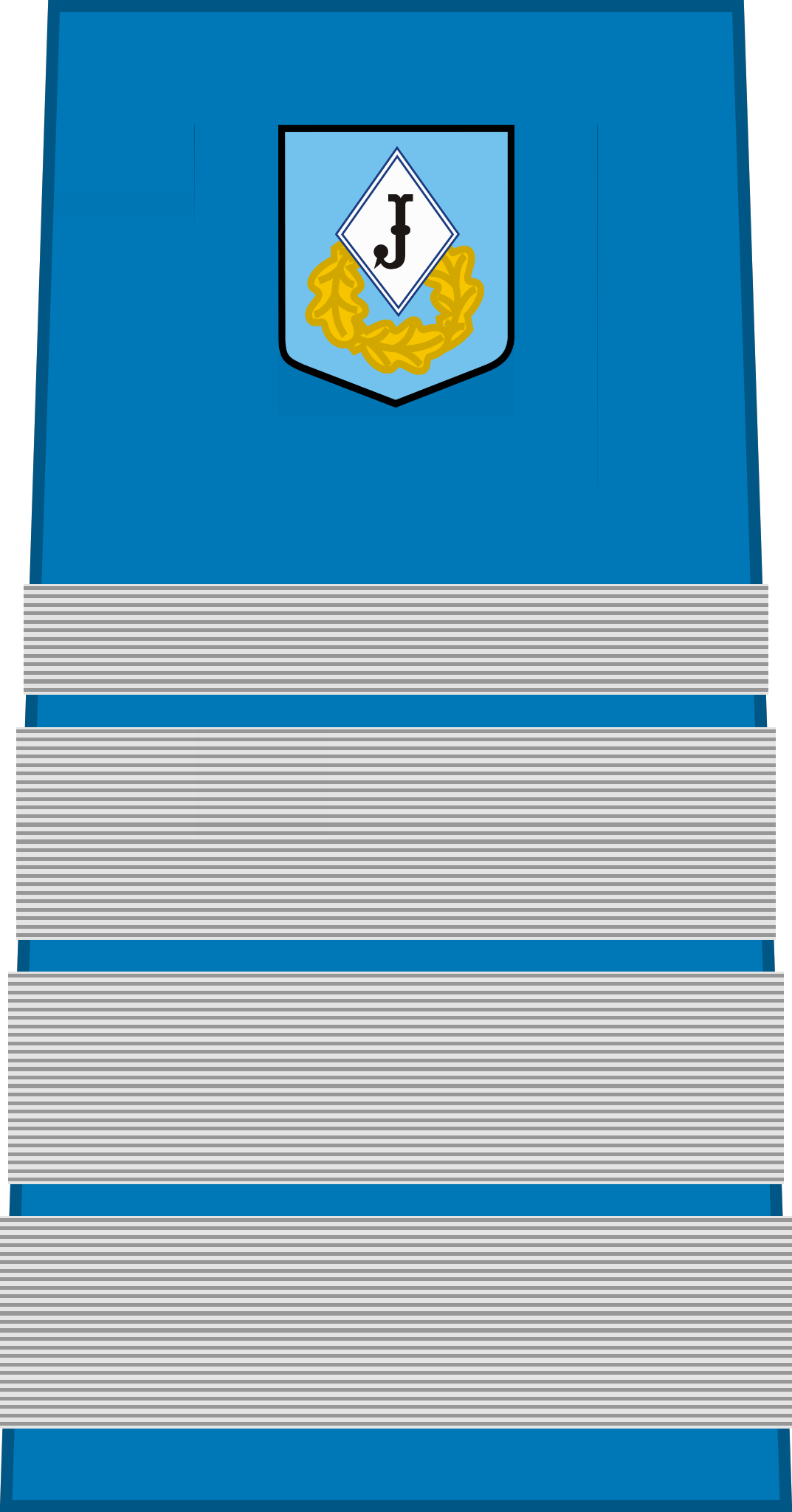
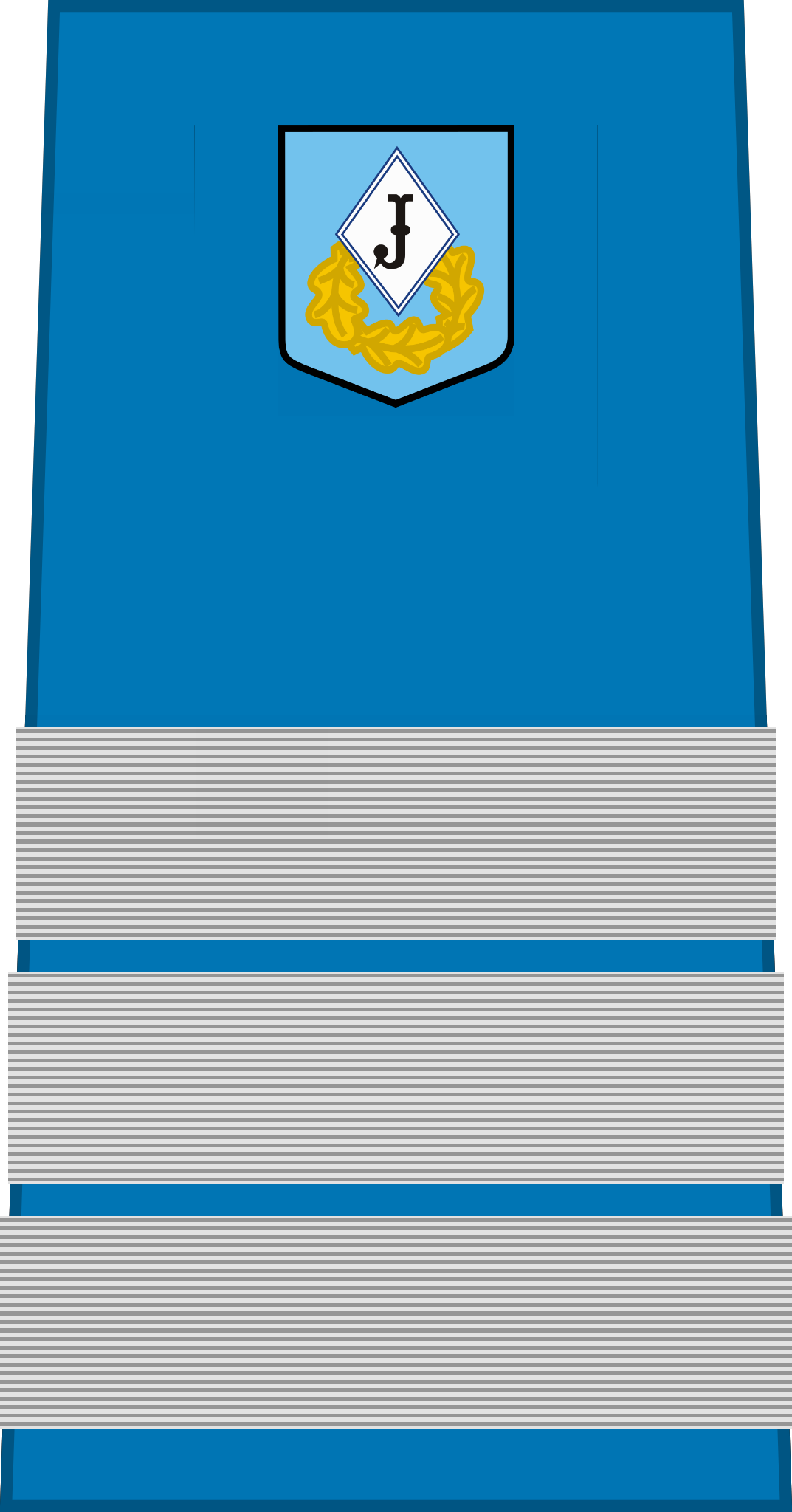
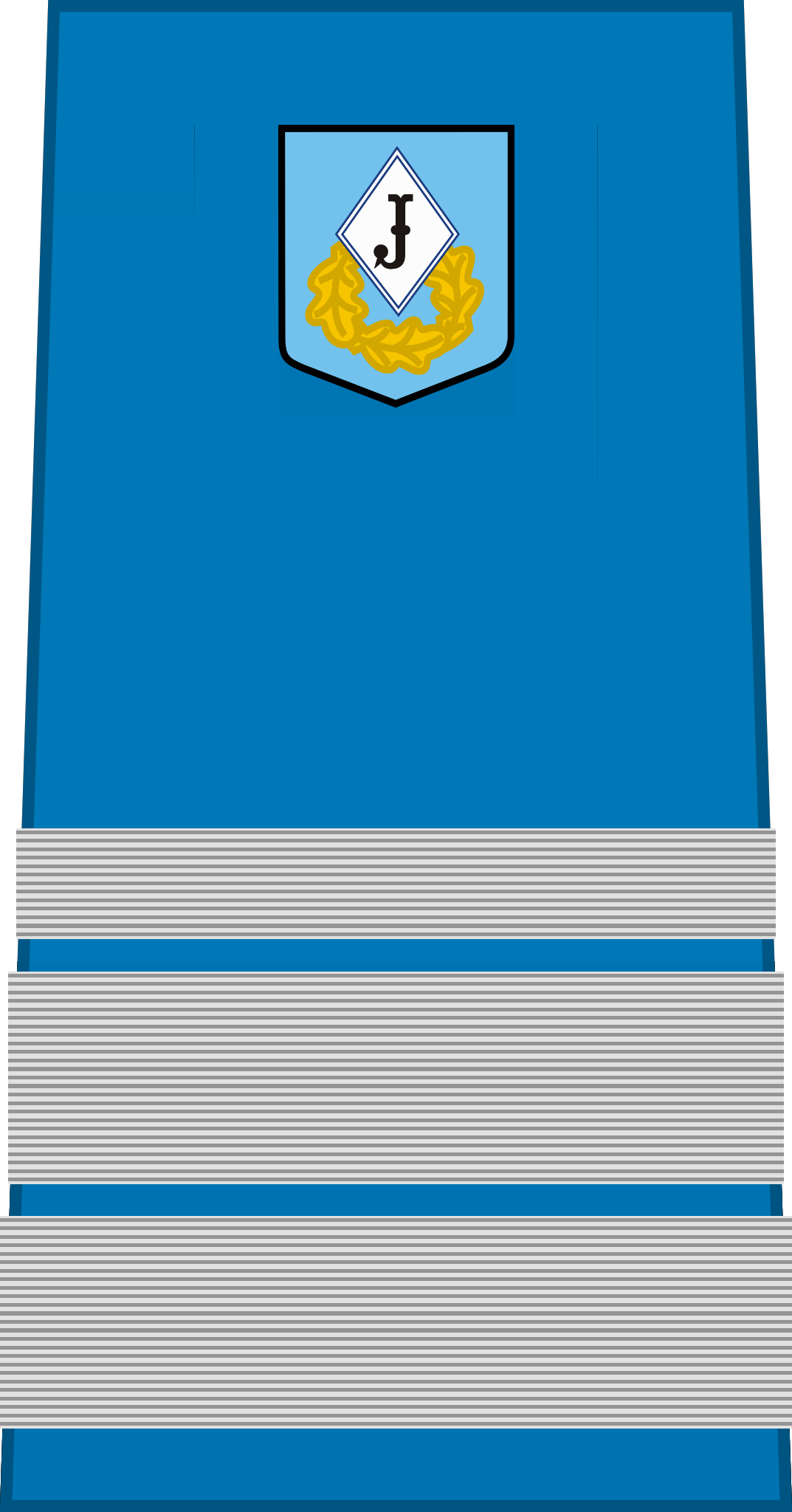
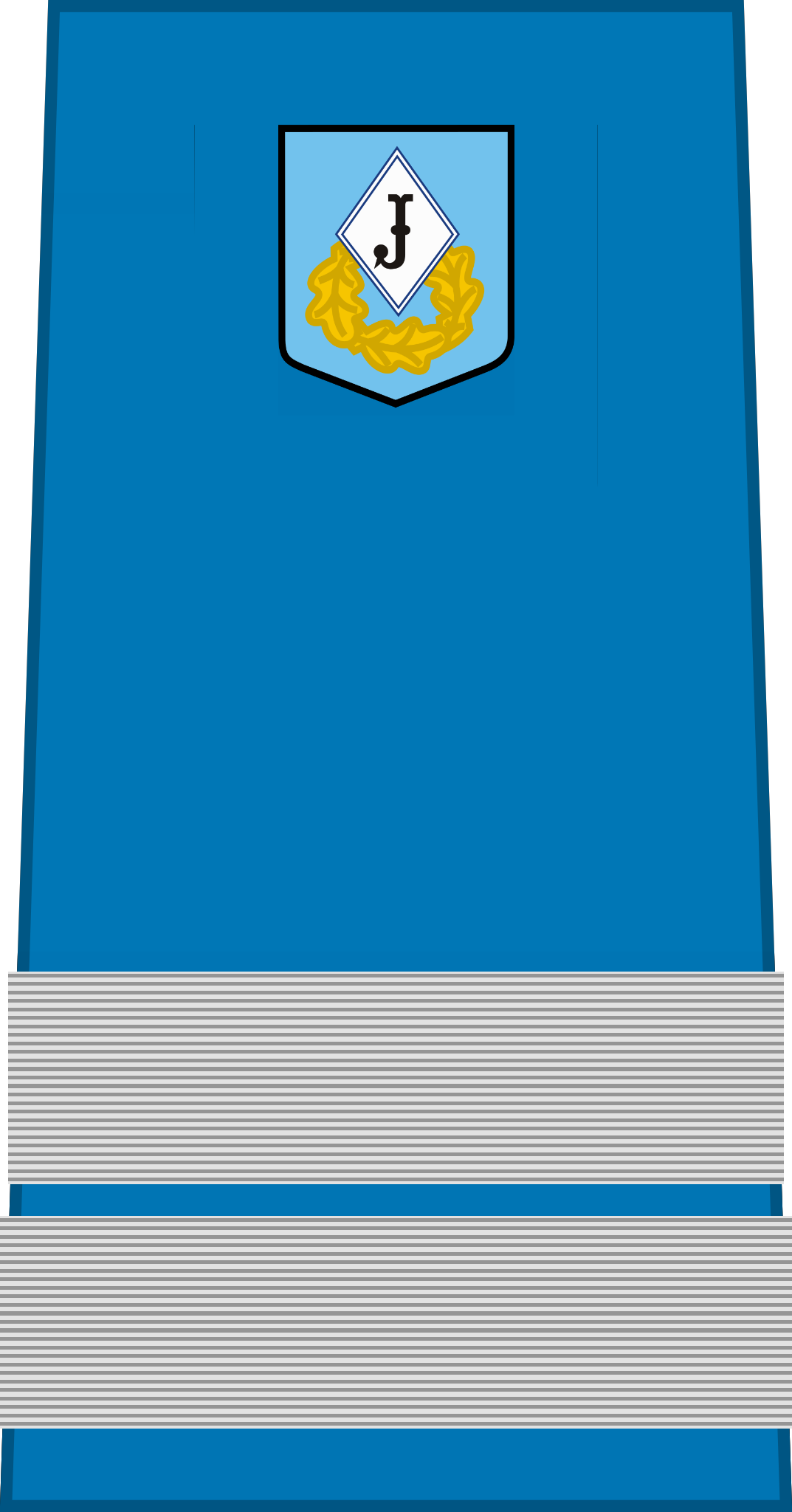
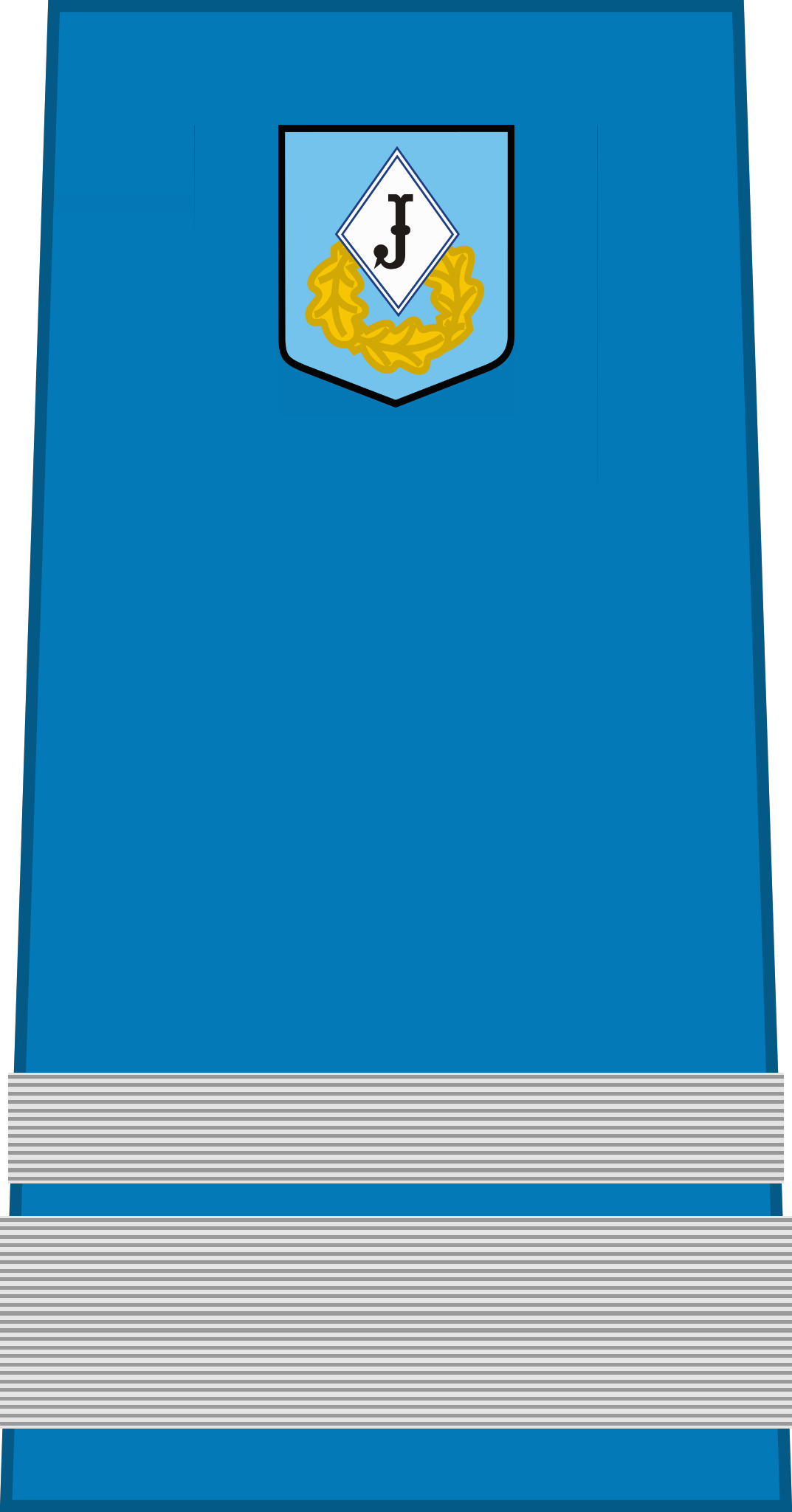
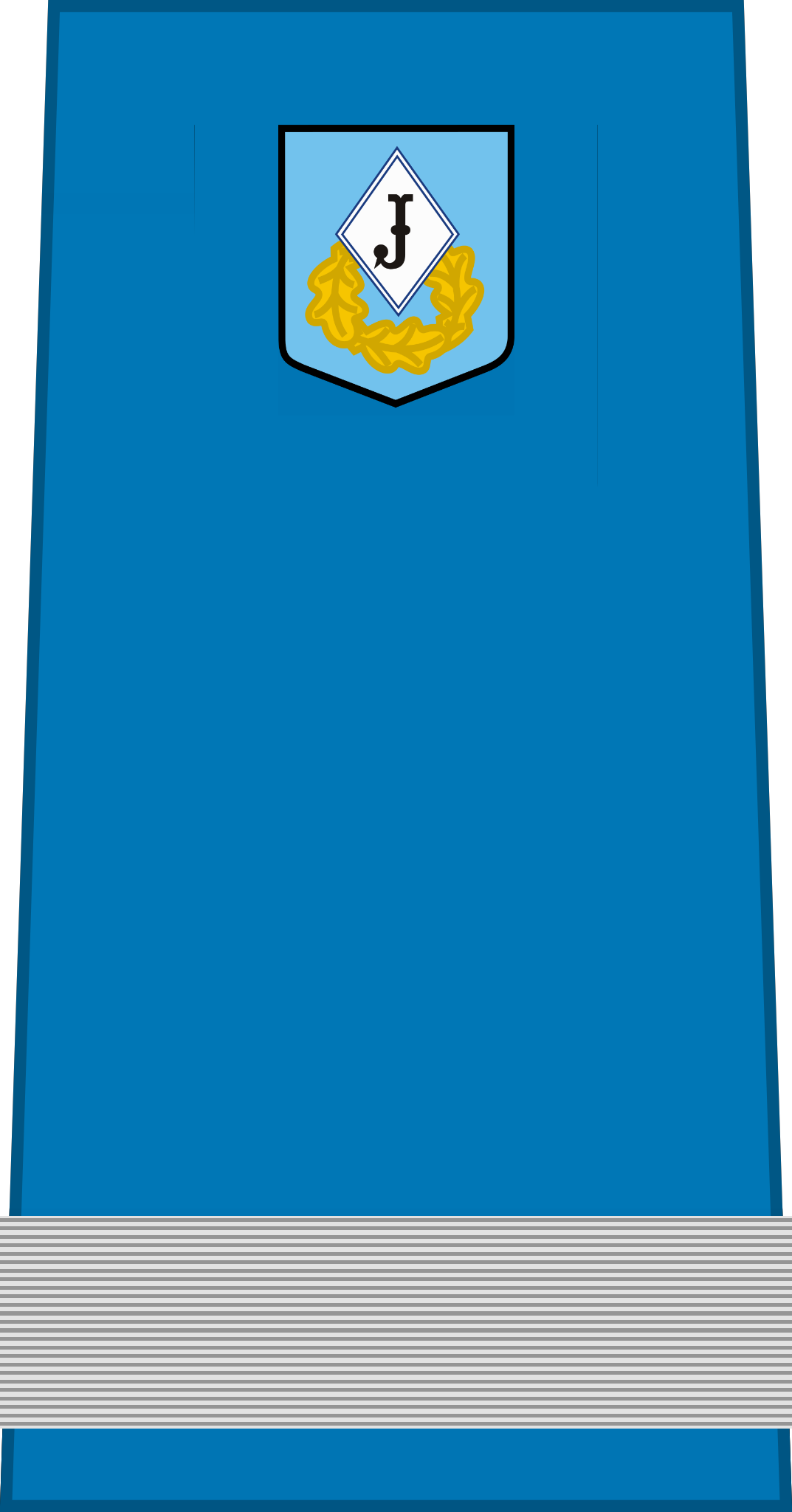
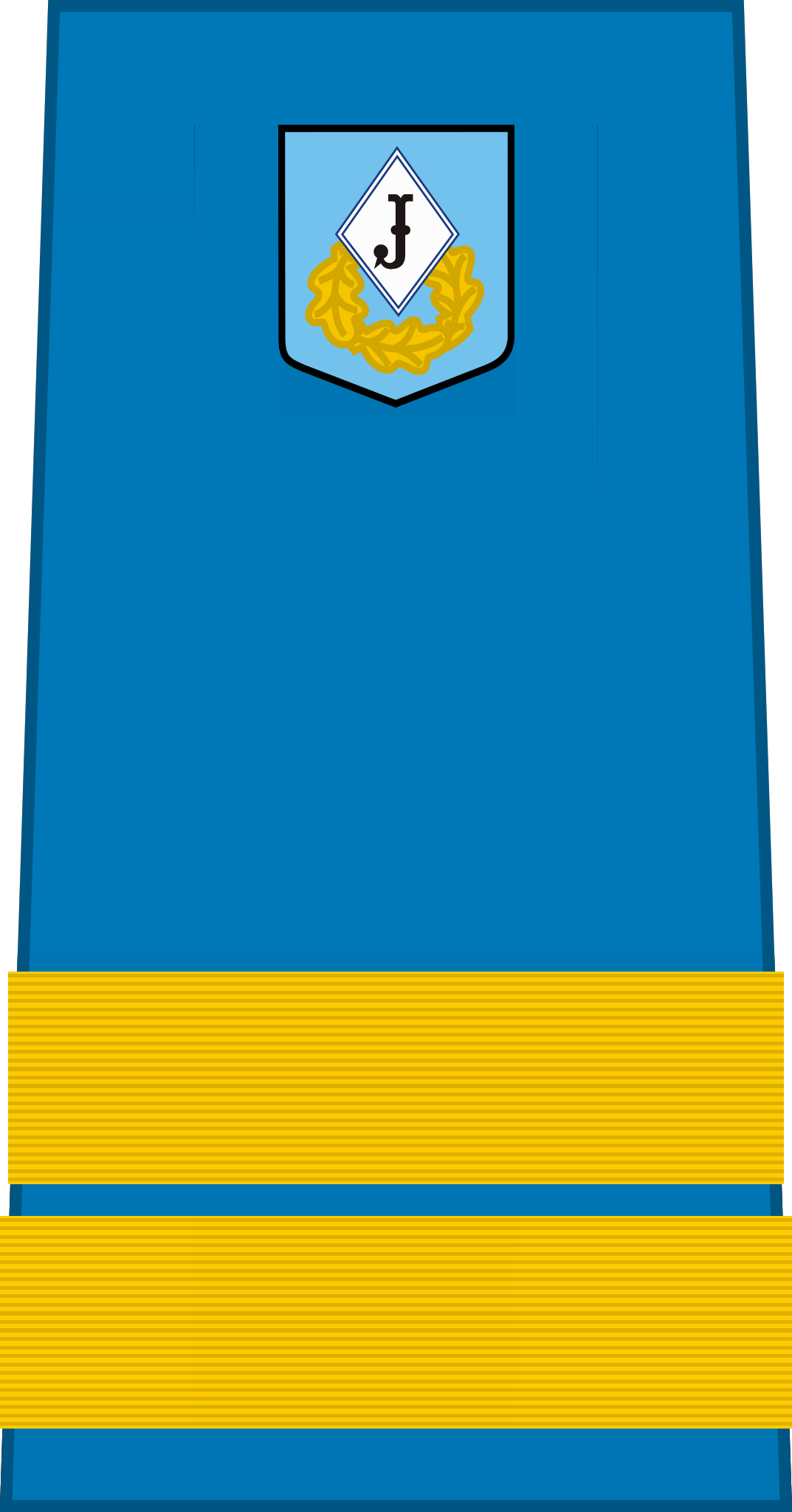
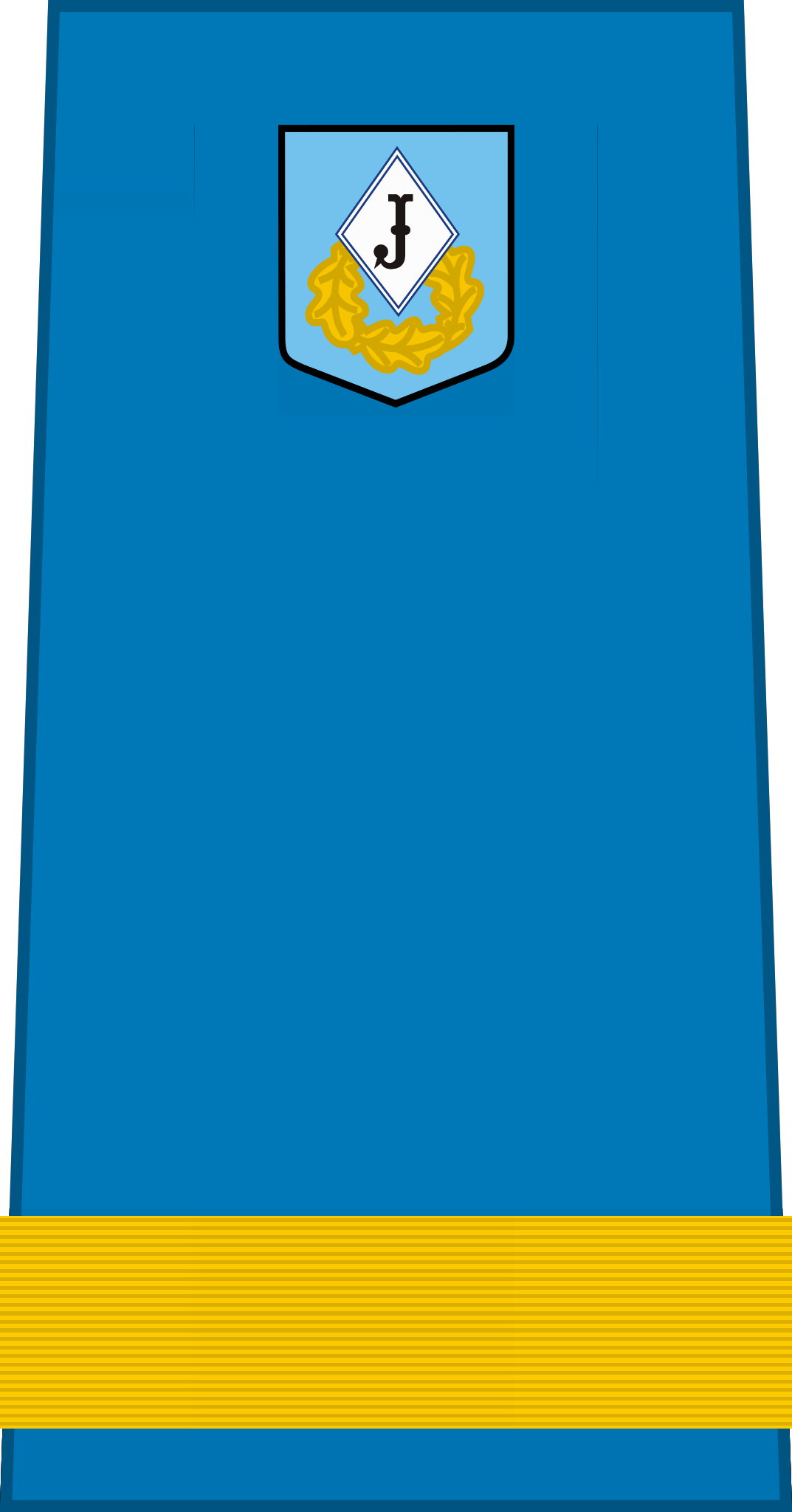
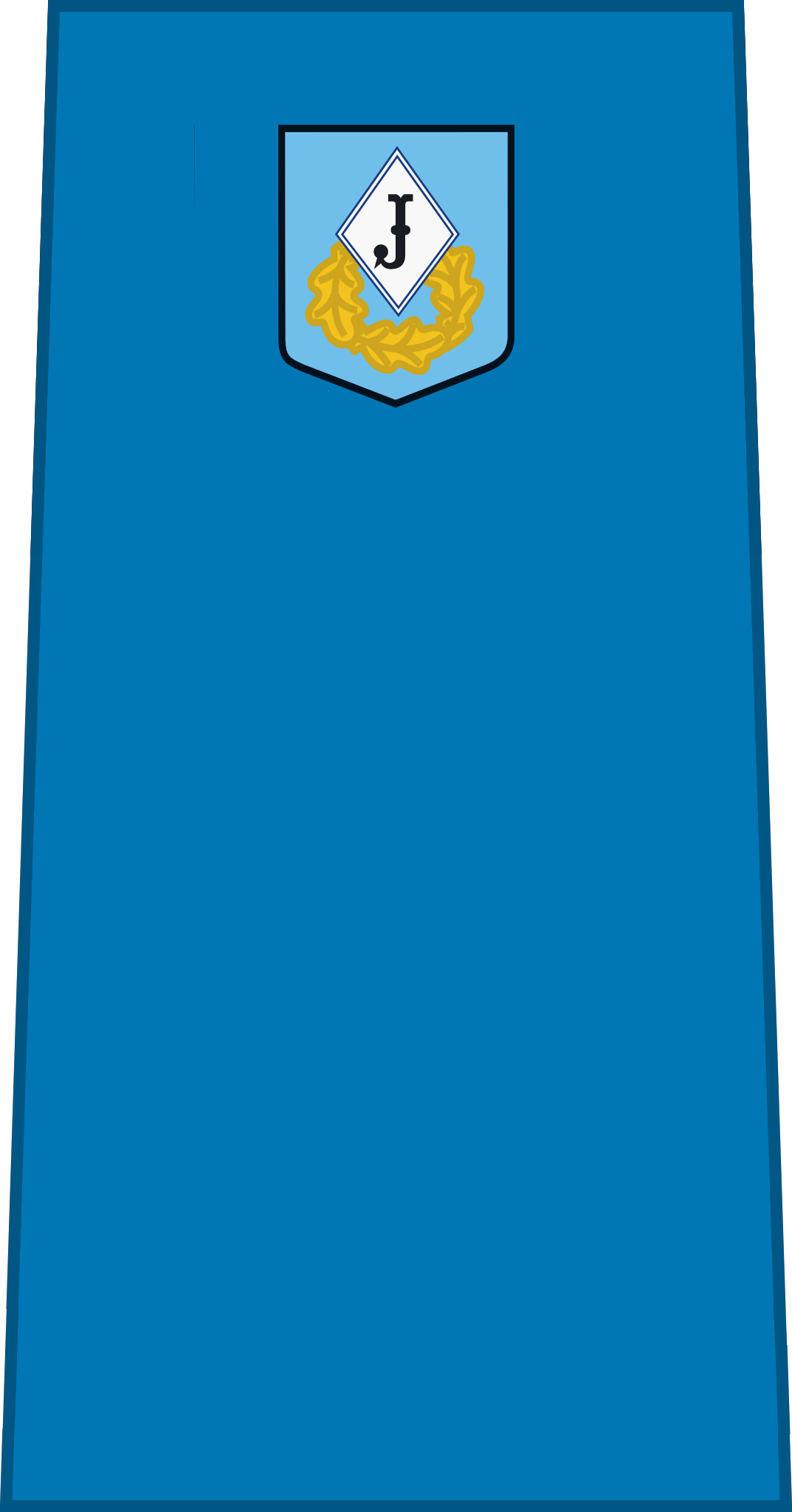
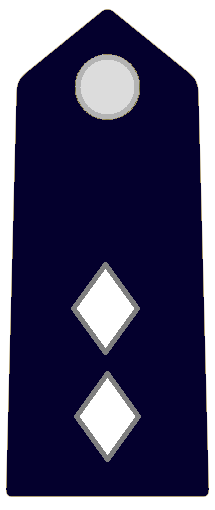
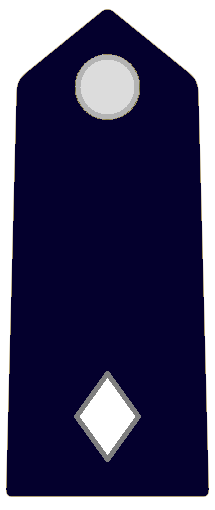
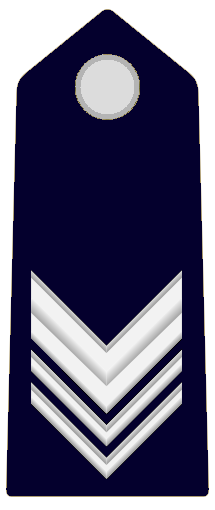
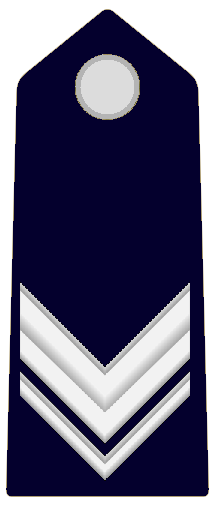
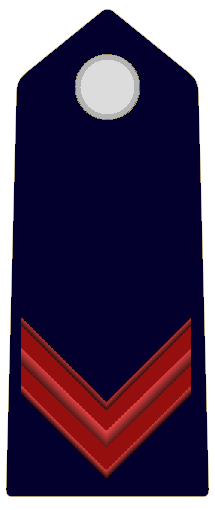
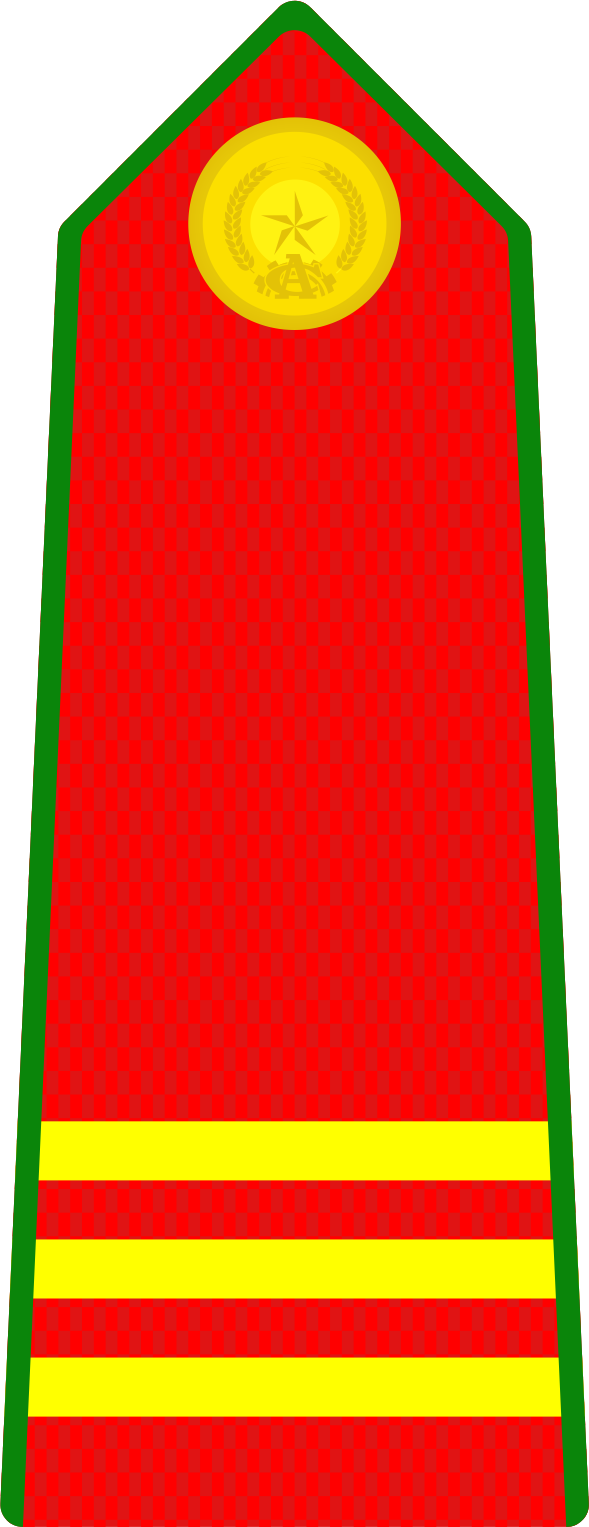
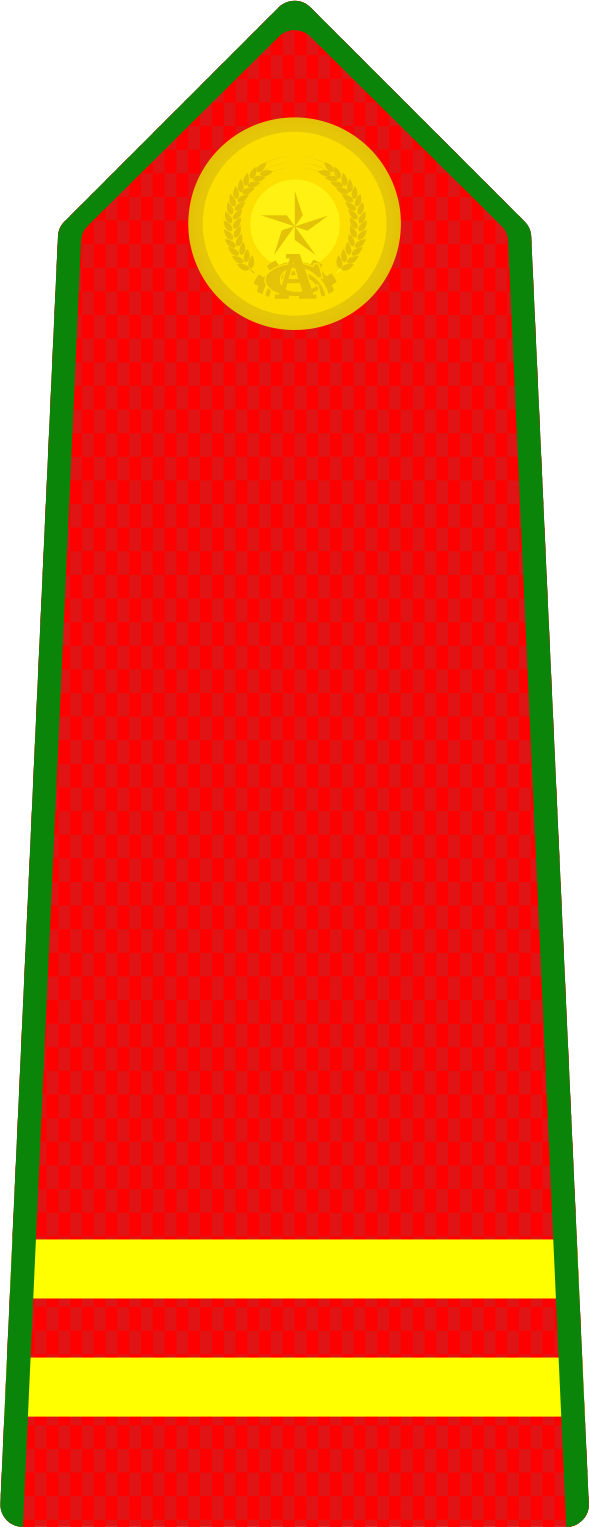
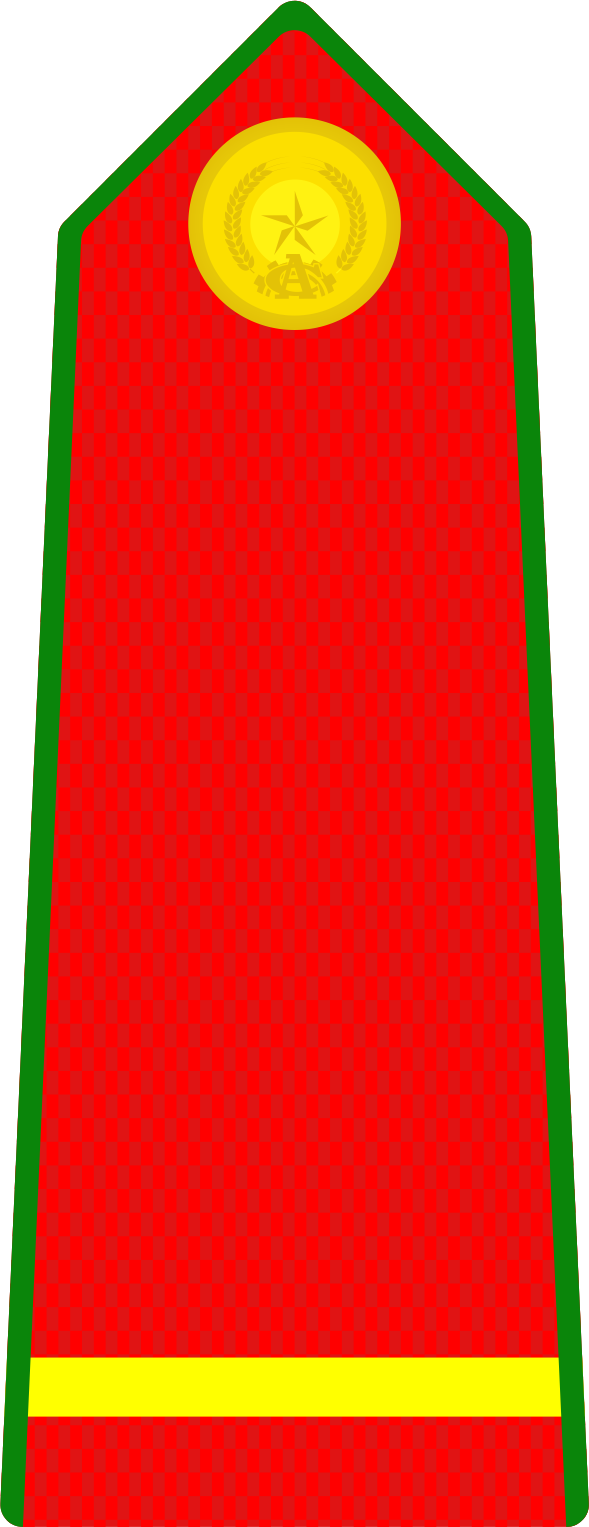
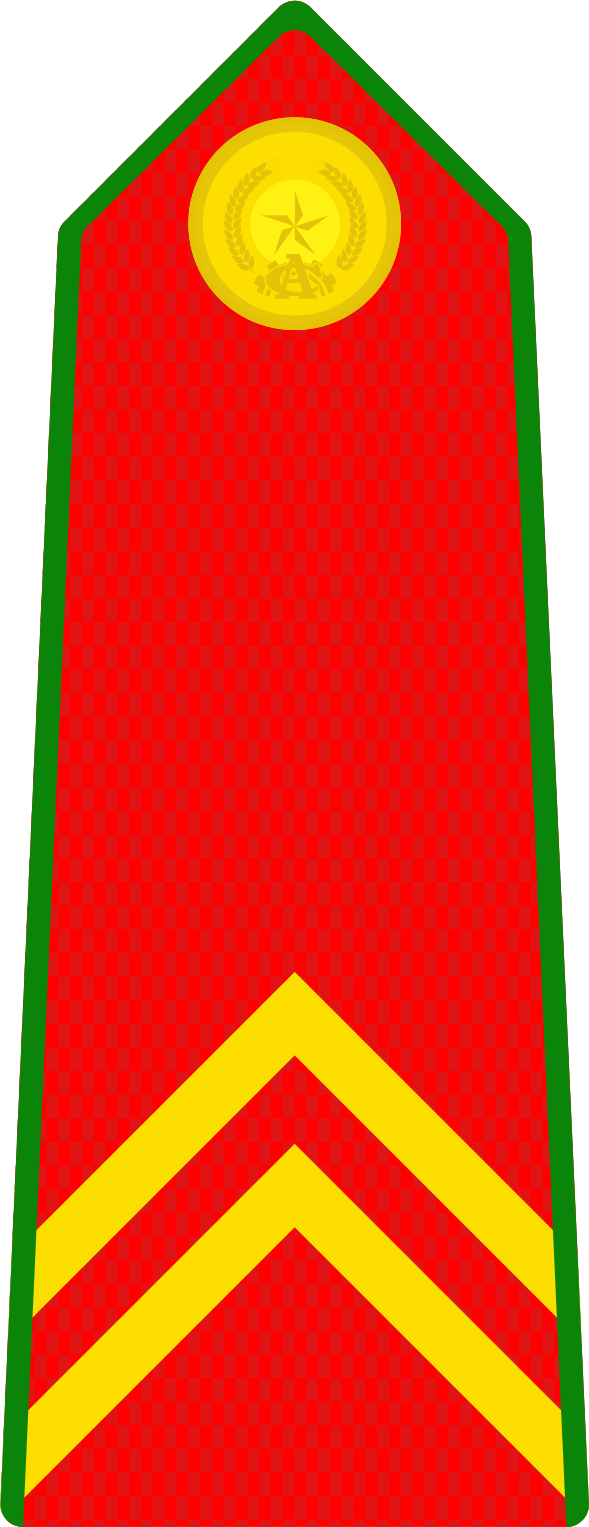
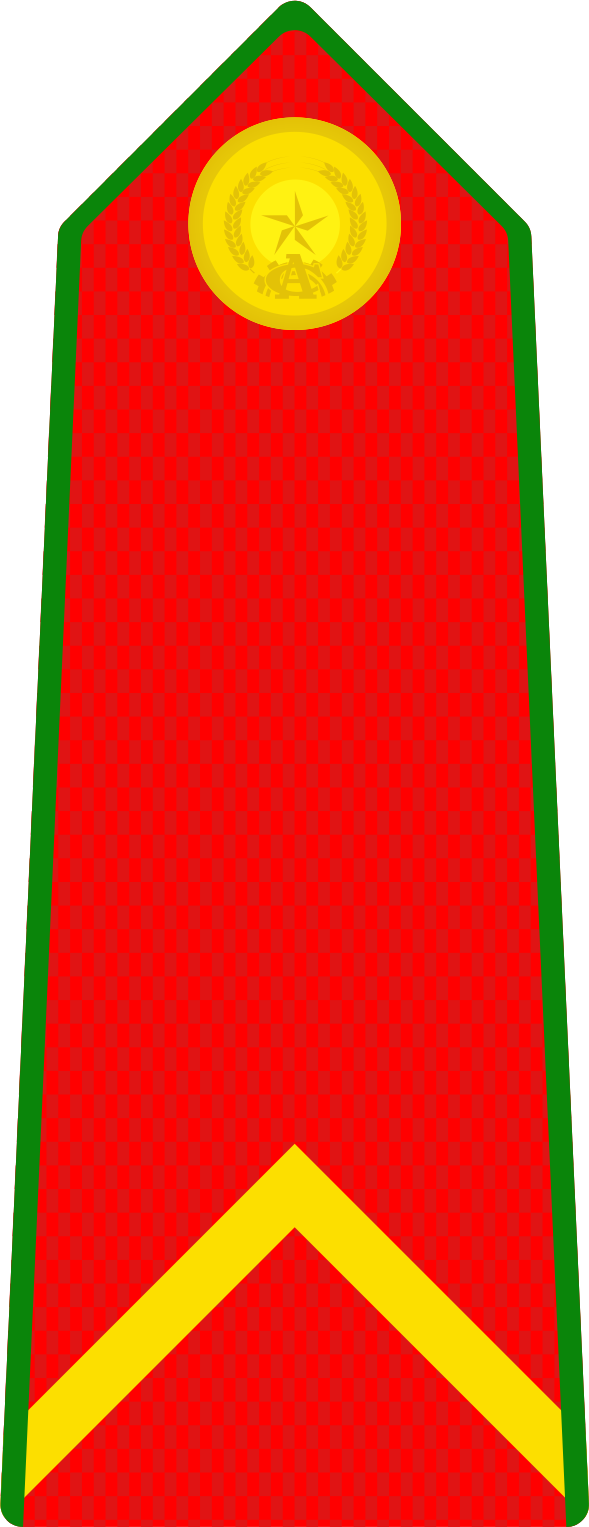
Rank group	Senior NCOs											Junior NCOs					Enlisted
Argentine National Gendarmerie																	No insignia
Argentine National Gendarmerie	Suboficial Mayor				Suboficial Principal		Sargento Ayudante	Sargento Primero	Sargento			Cabo Primero			Cabo		Gendarme
Argentine Naval Prefecture
Argentine Naval Prefecture	Ayudante mayor				Ayudante principal		Ayudante de primero	Ayudante de segundo	Ayudante de tercera			Cabo primero			Cabo segundo		Marinero
Brazilian Military Police
Brazilian Military Police	Subtenente							Primeiro-sargento	Segundo-sargento	Terceiro-sargento		Cabo					Soldado primeira classe		Soldado segunda classe
(Burkina Faso) Burkinabè National Gendarmerie
(Burkina Faso) Burkinabè National Gendarmerie	Adjudant major			Adjudant-chef	Adjudant			Maréchal-des-logis-chef	Maréchal-des-logis								Gendarme
Royal Cambodian Gendarmerie
Royal Cambodian Gendarmerie	ព្រឹន្ទបាលឯក; Pruentobal ek				ព្រឹន្ទបាលទោ Pruentobal tou		ពលបាលឯក; Polobal ek	ពលបាលទោ Polobal tou	ពលបាលត្រី Polobal trei			នាយឯក; Neay ek			នាយទោ Neay tou		ពលឯក; Pol ek		ពលទោ Pol tou
(Cameroon) Cameroonian National Gendarmerie
(Cameroon) Cameroonian National Gendarmerie	Adjudant-chef major			Adjudant-chef	Adjudant			Maréchal-des-logis-chef	Maréchal-des-logis			Gendarme major					Gendarme		Elève Gendarme
Royal Canadian Mounted Police																			No insignia
Royal Canadian Mounted Police	Corps sergeant major		Sergeant major		Staff sergeant major		Staff sergeant	Sergeant							Corporal				Constable	Cadet
Royal Canadian Mounted Police	Sergent-major du corps		Sergent-major		Sergent-major d'état major		Sergent d'état-major	Sergent							Caporal				Gendarme	Cadet
Chadian National Gendarmerie
Chadian National Gendarmerie							Sergent major	Sergent-chef	Sergent						Caporal		Soldat première		Soldat
Carabineros de Chile																				No insignia
Carabineros de Chile	Suboficial mayor				Suboficial		Sargento primero		Sargento segundo			Cabo primero			Cabo segundo				Carabinero	Carabinero alumno
Chilean Gendarmerie
Chilean Gendarmerie	Suboficial mayor				Suboficial		Sargento primero		Sargento segundo			Cabo primero			Cabo segundo	Cabo	Gendarme primero	Gendarme segundo	Gendarme	Gendarme alumno
People's Armed Police
People's Armed Police	武警一级警士长; Wǔjǐng Yījí jǐngshìzhǎng			武警二级警士长; Wǔjǐng Èrjí jǐngshìzhǎng	武警三级警士长; Wǔjǐng Sānjí jǐngshìzhǎng		武警四级警士长; Wǔjǐng Sìjí jǐngshìzhǎng	武警上士; Wǔjǐng Shàngshì	武警中士; Wǔjǐng Zhōngshì			武警下士; Wǔjǐng Xiàshì					武警上等兵; Wǔjǐng Shàngděngbīng		武警列兵; Wǔjǐng Lièbīng
Congolese Gendarmerie																			No insignia
Congolese Gendarmerie	Adjudant-chef				Adjudant			Maréchal des logis-chef	Maréchal des logis										Èleve gendarme
(Djibouti) Djiboutian National Gendarmerie
(Djibouti) Djiboutian National Gendarmerie	Major			Adjudant-chef	Adjudant			Marechal des Logis-chef	Gendarme principal			Gendarme de 1^{ère} classe			Gendarme de 2^{ème} classe				Elève gendarme
(France) French Gendarmerie
(France) French Gendarmerie	Major			Adjudant-chef	Adjudant			Maréchal-des-logis-chef	Gendarme	Gendarme sous contrat	Gendarme Adjoint Maréchal-des-logis	Gendarme Adjoint Brigadier Chef			Gendarme Adjoint Brigadier		Gendarme Adjoint première classe		Gendarme Adjoint
Assam Rifles																	No insignia
Assam Rifles	Subedar major सूबेदार मेजर				Subedar सूबेदार		Naib subedar नायब सूबेदार	Warrant officer -	Havildar (Note: Equivalent to the rank head constable (-)) हवलदार								Rifleman (Note: Equivalent to the rank constable (-)) -
Central Reserve Police Force																	No insignia
Central Reserve Police Force	Subedar major सूबेदार मेजर				Inspector निरीक्षक	Sub-inspector उप निरीक्षक	Assistant sub-inspector सहायक उप निरीक्षक	Head constable हवलदार									Constable कनिष्ठबल
Rank group	Senior NCOs											Junior NCOs					Enlisted
Iranian Law Enforcement Command
Iranian Law Enforcement Command	استوار یکم; Ostovar yekom				استوار دوم; Ostovar dovom		گروهبان یکم; Goruhban yekom	گروهبان دوم; Goruhban dovom	گروهبان سوم; Goruhban sevom			سرجوخه; Sarjukheh			سرباز یکم; Sarbaz yekom		سرباز دوم; Sarbaz dovom		سرباز; Sarbaz
Israel Border Police
Israel Border Police	רב נגד; Rav nagad			רב סמל בכיר; Rav samal bakhir	רב סמל מתקדם; Rav samal mitkadem	רב סמל ראשון; Rav samal rishon	רב סמל; Rav samal	סמל ראשון; Samal rishon	סמל שני; Samal sheni			רב שוטר; Rav shoter					שוטר; Shoter
Italian Carabinieri												Appuntato scelto q.s. / Appuntato scelto / Appuntato / Carabiniere scelto / Carabiniere
Italian Carabinieri	Primo luogotenente c.s. s.u.p.s	Luogotenente s.u.p.s.	Primo Maresciallo	Maresciallo Capo	Maresciallo Ordinario	Maresciallo	Brigadiere capo q.s.	Brigadiere capo	Vicebrigadiere			Appuntato scelto q.s. / Appuntato scelto / Appuntato / Carabiniere scelto / Carabiniere
Italian Guardia di Finanza																	No equivalent
Italian Guardia di Finanza	Luogotenente s.u.p.s.		Maresciallo Aiutante s.u.p.s	Maresciallo Capo	Maresciallo Ordinario	Maresciallo	Brigadiere Capo	Brigadiere	Vice Brigadiere			Appuntato scelto	Appuntato	Finanziere scelto	Finanziere		No equivalent
Mauritius Police Force
Mauritius Police Force								Sergeant				Corporal					Constable
Mexican National Guard
Mexican National Guard							Agente Mayor		Agente						Subagente				Guardia Nacional
Army of Monaco
Army of Monaco	Adjudant-chef				Adjudant		Maréchal-des-logis-major	Maréchal-des-logis-chef	Maréchal-des-logis						Brigadier		Carabinier de première classe		Carabinier de deuxième classe
Royal Moroccan Gendarmerie
Royal Moroccan Gendarmerie	Adjudant-chef				Adjudant		Sergent-major	Sergent-chef	Sergent
Royal Marechaussee
Royal Marechaussee	Adjudant-onderofficier						Opperwachtmeester	Wachtmeester der 1e klasse	Wachtmeester			Marechaussee der 1e klasse			Marechaussee der 2e klasse		Marechaussee der 3e klasse		Marechaussee der 4e klasse
National Gendarmerie of Niger
National Gendarmerie of Niger	Major			Adjudant-chef	Adjudant			Maréchal des logis chef	Maréchal des logis			Gendarme de 1^{re} classe			Gendarme de 2^{e} classe		Gendarme de 3^{e} classe		Gendarme de 4^{e} classe	Gendarme auxiliaire
Pakistan; Federal Constabulary																	No insignia
Pakistan; Federal Constabulary	Subedar-Major صوبیدار میجر				Subedar صوبیدار		Naib Subedar نائب صوبیدار	Havildar حوالدار۔				Naik نائیک۔			Lance Naik لانس نائیک۔		Constable کانسٹیبل
Pakistan Rangers																	No insignia
Pakistan Rangers	Senior inspector سینئر انسپکٹر۔				Inspector انسپکٹر		Sub inspector سب انسپکٹر۔	Havildar حوالدار۔				Naik نائیک۔			Lance Naik لانس نائیک۔		Sepoy سپاہی۔
Rank group	Senior NCOs											Junior NCOs					Enlisted
Żandarmeria wojskowa
Żandarmeria wojskowa	Starszy chorąży sztabowy			Starszy chorąży	Chorąży			Młodszy chorąży	Starszy sierżant			Sierżant			Plutonowy	Starszy kapral	Kapral		Starszy szeregowy	Szeregowy
(Portugal) National Republican Guard
(Portugal) National Republican Guard	Sargento-mor			Sargento-chefe	Sargento-ajudante		Primeiro-sargento	Segundo-sargento	Furriel			Cabo-mor	Cabo-chefe		Cabo-de-curso		Cabo	Guarda principal	Guarda
(Romania) Romanian Gendarmerie
(Romania) Romanian Gendarmerie	Plutonier adjutant șef			Plutonier adjutant	Plutonier-major		Plutonier	Sergent-major	Sergent			Caporal			Fruntaș		Jandarm
Corps of Gendarmerie of San Marino
Corps of Gendarmerie of San Marino	Maresciallo							Brigadiere	Vice-brigadiere						Appuntato				Gendarme
Senegalese Gendarmerie
Senegalese Gendarmerie	Adjutant-major			Adjutant-chef	Adjutant			Maréchal des logis-chef	Maréchal des logis								Gendarme
(Spain) Spanish Civil Guard
(Spain) Spanish Civil Guard	Suboficial mayor			Subteniente	Brigada		Sargento primero	Sargento	Cabo mayor			Cabo primero			Cabo		Guardia Civil de Primera (Note: Rank in abeyance)		Guardia Civil
Turkish Gendarmerie
Turkish Gendarmerie	Astsubay kıdemli başçavuş				Astsubay başçavuş		Astsubay kıdemli üstçavuş	Astsubay üstçavuş	Astsubay kıdemli çavuş	Astsubay çavuş		Uzman Jandarma Kademeli Çavuş	I. Kıdemli Uzman Çavuş	Uzman Çavuş	Uzman onbaşı
Republic of China Military Police
Republic of China Military Police	一等士官長; Yīděng shìguānzhǎng				二等士官長; Èrděng shìguānzhǎng		三等士官長; Sānděng shìguānzhǎng	上士; Shàngshì	中士; Zhōngshì			下士; Xiàshì			上等兵; Shàngděngbīng		一等兵; Yīděngbīng		二等兵; Èrděngbīng
U.S. Coast Guard
U.S. Coast Guard	Command master chief petty officer			Master chief petty officer	Senior chief petty officer		Chief petty officer	Petty officer first class	Petty officer second class			Petty officer third class			Seaman		Seaman apprentice		Seaman recruit
Vanuatu Mobile Forces
Vanuatu Mobile Forces	Warrant officer class 1				Warrant officer class 2		Staff sergeant	Sergeant				Corporal			Lance corporal		Constable	Recruit
Vanuatu Mobile Forces							Staf Sajen	Sajen				Kofol					Polis	Rikrut
Gendarmerie of Vatican City
Gendarmerie of Vatican City							Ispettore		Vice ispettore			Brigadiere	Vice brigadiere					Gendarme
Vietnam People's; Public Security
Vietnam People's; Public Security					Master sergeant (Thượng sĩ)			Sergeant (Trung sĩ)				Corporal (Hạ sĩ)					Constable 1st class (Chiến sĩ bậc 1)		Constable 2nd class (Chiến sĩ bậc 2)
Rank group	Senior NCOs											Junior NCOs					Enlisted

== See also ==
- List of police ranks
- List of gendarmeries
- Ranks and insignia of NATO armies officers
- Ranks and insignia of NATO air forces enlisted
- Ranks and insignia of NATO air forces officers
- Ranks and insignia of NATO navies enlisted
- Ranks and insignia of NATO navies officers

== Notes ==
Assam Rifles

Spanish Civil Guard
