= List of wars involving Burkina Faso =

This is a list of wars involving Burkina Faso.

Conflict	Combatant 1	Combatant 2	Result
Upper Voltan coup d'état (1983)	Government of Upper Volta: Conservative Armed Forces Faction	Left-Wing Armed Forces Faction	Revolutionary victory: Thomas Sankara installed as the President of Upper Volta
Agacher Strip War (1985)	Burkina Faso	Mali	Ceasefire
1987 Burkinabé coup d'état (1987)	Government of Burkina Faso: CDRs	(Burkina Faso) Military Faction (Liberia) NPFL Supported by: Libya; France; Ivory Coast; Mali	Coup attempt succeeds: Thomas Sankara is overthrown and murdered.; Blaise Compaoré is installed as the new president.
Sierra Leonean Civil War (1991–2002)	RUF (Sierra Leone) AFRC; West Side Boys; Liberia: NPFL; Supported by: Libya; Burkina Faso; Moldova	Sierra Leone: SLA; CDF; United Kingdom; Guinea; ECOMOG Forces; Executive Outcomes Supported by: United States; Belarus (United Nations) UNAMSIL	Commonwealth victory
War in the Sahel (2011–present)	Alliance of Sahel States: Mali; Niger; Burkina Faso; Benin; Togo (Note: JNIM has had a small presence in northern Togo since 2021, with several attacks carried out since then.); Ivory Coast (Note: Jihadist groups have little to no presence on Ivorian soil, but have occasionally launched attacks along the Burkinabe-Ivorian border since 2019. AQIM attacked Grand-Bassam in 2016 as well.); Algeria (Note: No jihadist groups are active on Algerian soil, although the country has been attacked several times in the early days of the Mali War by jihadist groups. Currently, diplomatic relations between the AES states and Algeria are bad due to Algeria allowing FLA rebels on their soil.); Mauritania (Note: The Mauritanian government currently has a non-aggression pact with JNIM-aligned jihadists, and has not had an attack by jihadist groups on its soil since 2011. Small JNIM cells are present along the Malian border.) Supported by: Africa Corps (since 2021) (Note: Previously Wagner Group, since renamed Africa Corps and absorbed by Russian government.); Turkey (since 2022); France (2013–2023); United States (until 2024); MINUSMA (2013–2023) (Note: For full list of MINUSMA combatants, see here); AFISMA (2012–2013); G5 Sahel (until 2023)	Al-Qaeda; Jama'at Nasr al-Islam wal Muslimin; Ansarul Islam; Boko Haram; Islamic State; Islamic State - Sahel Province; Lakurawa (2023–present); Islamic State - West Africa Province; Azawad Liberation Front Nigerien anti-coup movement: Patriotic Front for Justice; Free Armed Forces; Former belligerents: CSP-PSD (2023-2024); Coordination of Azawad Movements (2014-2021, 2023-2024); MNLA (2012-2024); HCUA (2013-2024); MAA (2012-2024) GATIA (al-Mahmoud faction) (2023–2024) (Note: Faction affiliated with the CSP-PSD) Patriotic Liberation Front (2023-2024)	Ongoing: Mali War: Tuareg rebels and allied Islamists overrun Northern Mali in 2012 until pushed back by a French intervention; Islamist insurgency in Burkina Faso: Mali War spills over into Burkina Faso by 2015 as Islamists capture about 40% of Burkinabé territory; Islamist insurgency in Niger; Boko Haram insurgency arises and extends in Chad, Niger, and Cameroon; French and American intervention on behalf of governments; Al-Qaeda–Islamic State conflict and the JNIM-ISGS war; Jihadist insurgency in Northern Benin; Rise of the coup belt
2014 Burkinabé Uprising (2014)	Government of Burkina Faso: Congress for Democracy and Progress; Alliance for Democracy and Federation – African Democratic Rally	(Burkina Faso) Opposition Parties: People's Movement for Progress; Union for Progress and Reform; Union for Rebirth / Sankarist Movement; Party for Development and Change; National Rebirth Party; Le Balai Citoyen	Revolutionary victory: Suspension of constitutional amendment bill in parliament.; Parliament dissolved.; President Blaise Compaoré resigns and flees to Ivory Coast.; Yacouba Isaac Zida becomes acting president, amid immediate dispute but eventual resolution.
Jihadist Insurgency in Burkina Faso (2015–present)	Burkina Faso: National Gendarmerie; Volunteers for the Defense of the Homeland; Koglweogos (civilian militias); France; Russia Supported by: Mali; United States	Ansar ul Islam; Jama'at Nasr al-Islam wal Muslimin; Ansar Dine; Islamic State in the Greater Sahara; Islamic State – West Africa Province	Ongoing: Possible spillover in Benin
