= 2023 Burkina Faso coup attempt =

2023 coup d'état attempt in Burkina Faso

2023 Burkina Faso coup d'état attempt
- Part of the 2020s coup attempts in the Coup Belt
| Date | 26 September 2023 |
| Location | Ouagadougou, Burkina Faso |
| Result | Coup failed |

Belligerents
| (Burkina Faso) Patriotic Movement for Safeguard and Restoration | Burkina Faso Armed Forces dissidents |

Commanders and leaders
| Ibrahim Traoré; Célestin Simporé; Abdoulaye Gandema; Seydou Ouattara | Cheikh Hamza Ouattara; Abdoul Aziz Aouoba; Christophe Maïga; Sekou Ouedraogo; Boubacar Keita |

On 26 September 2023, dissidents of the Burkina Faso Armed Forces attempted to overthrow the ruling military junta led by Ibrahim Traoré, who came to power a year earlier.

== Coups of 2022 ==
In a previous coup in January 2022, Paul-Henri Sandaogo Damiba overthrew the government of Roch Marc Christian Kaboré due to the Burkinabé government's inability to suppress the jihadist insurgency in Burkina Faso, which had begun in 2019 and saw jihadists make gains across the country in late 2021. Initially, Damiba's government was welcomed by the Burkinabé populace, but Damiba was unable to control the insurgency, and was subsequently overthrown himself by dissidents led by Ibrahim Traoré. Traoré subsequently claimed to have thwarted a coup attempt against him led by lieutenant-colonel Emmanuel Zoungrana in December 2022.

Amid rumors of discontent within the Burkinabe army, Traoré shuffled his cabinet. Sekou Ouedraogo was removed from head of the National Intelligence Services of Burkina Faso, and Seydou Ouattara was appointed to the role. Abdoulaye Gandema was appointed head of state security and police services. Célestin Simporé had been appointed head of the Burkinabe Armed Forces in April 2023.

On 25 September 2023, Jeune Afrique published an article about growing tensions between disgruntled military officers in Ouagadougou. Soldiers and officers were angered over the death of Zanga Moumouni Traore, a VDP commander who was killed while fighting jihadists near Bobo-Dioulasso as he did not have enough equipment. The tensions came at a time when sporadic gunfire was heard at a Burkinabé army base in the city and near Traore's residence. As a result, the Burkinabé junta suspended Jeune Afrique from reporting within the country, calling the articles "untruthful".

== Coup attempt ==
On the night of 26 September, pro-Traoré social media accounts posted messages encouraging supporters of the junta, colloquially known as "Guardians of the Transition", to go out and protest in support of Traoré after rumors of a possible coup surfaced. Pro-junta protests also occurred in the cities of Bobo-Dioulasso and Gaoua. On the morning of 27 September, smaller protests broke out in downtown Ouagadougou against Traoré's rule. The protests were quickly dissipated. That night, the junta stated that a coup attempt by high-ranking security officers was foiled by intelligence gathered by the Burkinabé intelligence agency. The junta stated that four officers were arrested in connection with the coup attempt, and that two more were on the run.

The Burkinabe junta later stated that the perpetrators of the coup were Abdoul Aziz Aouoba, the commander of the Burkinabe Special Forces, Lieutenant Colonel Boubacar Keita, director of the Higher Institute of Civil Protection Studies, Lieutenant Colonel Cheikh Hamza Ouattara, commander of the special forces of the VDP, and Christophe Maiga, deputy commander of VDP special forces. Two other officers, including Sekou Ouedraogo, former director of the National Intelligence Services of Burkina Faso who was fired on September 13, were said to be in hiding.

== Aftermath ==
On 4 October, Traoré dismissed Lieutenant-Colonel Évrard Somda as head of the national gendarmerie, replacing him with Lieutenant-Colonel Kouagri Natamah, after it emerged that two commanders of special gendarmerie units had been arrested for involvement in the coup.

Months later in January 2024, the government announced it had thwarted another planned coup set for 14 January. In what was officially described as the "umpteenth attempt at destabilization," junta forces made several arrests of military and civilian personnel.
