= Military ranks of Burkina Faso =

The Military ranks of Burkina Faso are the military insignia used by the Burkina Faso Armed Forces. Burkina Faso is a landlocked country and, therefore, does not possess a navy. Being a former colony of France, Burkina Faso shares a rank structure similar to that of France.

== Current ranks ==
=== Commissioned officer ranks ===
The rank insignia of commissioned officers.

Rank group	General / flag officers				Senior officers				Junior officers
Burkina Faso Ground Forces
Burkina Faso Ground Forces	Général d'armée	Général de corps d'armée	Général de division	Général de brigade	Colonel-major	Colonel	Lieutenant-colonel	Commandant	Capitaine	Lieutenant	Sous-lieutenant
Burkina Faso Air Force
Burkina Faso Air Force	Général d'armée	Général de corps d'armée	Général de division	Général de brigade	Colonel-major	Colonel	Lieutenant-colonel	Commandant	Capitaine	Lieutenant	Sous-lieutenant
(Burkina Faso) Burkinabè National Gendarmerie
(Burkina Faso) Burkinabè National Gendarmerie	Général d'armée	Général de corps d'armée	Général de division	Général de brigade	Colonel-major	Colonel	Lieutenant-colonel	Commandant	Capitaine	Lieutenant	Sous-lieutenant
Rank group	General / flag officers				Senior officers				Junior officers

==== Student officer ranks ====
Rank group	Student officer
Aspirant

=== Other ranks ===
The rank insignia of non-commissioned officers and enlisted personnel.

Rank group	Senior NCOs					Junior NCOs		Enlisted
Burkina Faso Ground Forces
Burkina Faso Ground Forces	Adjudant-chef major	Adjudant-chef	Adjudant	Sergent-chef/ Maréchal-des-logis-chef	Sergent/ Maréchal-des-logis	Caporal-chef/ Brigadier-chef	Caporal/ Brigadier	Soldat de première classe	Soldat de deuxeme classe
Burkina Faso Air Force									No insignia
Burkina Faso Air Force	Adjudant-chef major	Adjudant-chef	Adjudant	Sergent-chef	Sergent	Caporal-chef	Caporal	Soldat de première classe	Soldat de deuxeme classe
(Burkina Faso) Burkinabè National Gendarmerie
(Burkina Faso) Burkinabè National Gendarmerie	Adjudant major	Adjudant-chef	Adjudant	Maréchal-des-logis-chef	Maréchal-des-logis			Gendarme
Rank group	Senior NCOs					Junior NCOs		Enlisted

== Historic ranks ==
During the regime of Thomas Sankara, Burkina Faso briefly introduced Soviet-style rank insignia, (Note: They are visible on multiple photos from the period.) which were reverted to the French-style when he was overthrown.

Rank group	General / flag officers				Senior officers				Junior officers
Burkina Faso Ground Forces (1983–1987)
Burkina Faso Ground Forces (1983–1987)	Général d'armée	Général de corps d'armée	Général de division	Général de brigade	Colonel Major	Colonel	Lieutenant-Colonel	Commandant	Capitaine	Lieutenant	Sous-Lieutenant	Aspirant
