= David Kabré =

Burkinabe military leader and politician

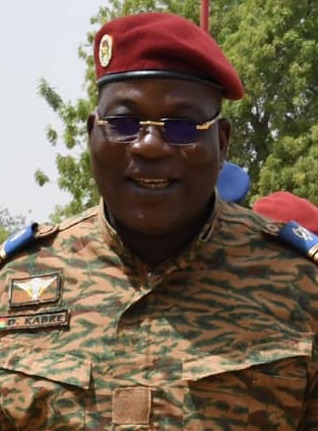
- David Kabré in 2023

Chief of General Staff of Burkina Faso
- In office February 2022 – 30 March 2023
- Preceded by: Gilbert Noël Ouédraogo
- Succeeded by: Célestin Simpore

Minister of Sports and Recreation
- In office 23 November 2014 – 6 January 2016

Personal details
- Born: 7 December 1968 (age 57) Tintilou, Burkina Faso

David Kabré (born 7 December 1968 in Tintilou) is a Burkinabe military figure and politician who is a senior colonel in the Burkina Faso Armed Forces.

== Career ==
He started his military career as an infantry soldier in 1991. He served as Minister of Sports and Recreation from 2014 to 2016.

He has been a leader in the armed forces during the Jihadist insurgency in Burkina Faso.
