= Kassoum Coulibaly =

Burkina Faso politician

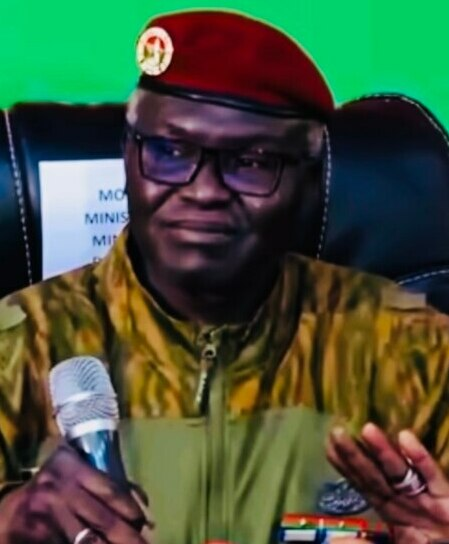

Minister of Defense and Veterans Affairs of Burkina Faso
- In office November 3, 2022 – 8 December 2024
- President: Ibrahim Traoré
- Preceded by: Paul-Henri Sandaogo Damiba
- Succeeded by: Célestin Simpore

Ambassador of Burkina Faso in the United States
- Incumbent
- Assumed office 24 July 2025
- President: Ibrahim Traoré
- Preceded by: Alpha Barry

Personal details
- Born: Sindou, Burkina Faso
- Party: People's Movement for Progress
- Relations: Ibrahim Traoré (nephew)

Kassoum Coulibaly is a Burkinabe politician and military figure who served as Minister of Defense and Veterans Affairs in Burkina Faso from the September 2022 Burkina Faso coup d'état to 2024. Since 2025, he has been the Burkinabe ambassador to the United States.

== Biography ==
Coulibaly is from the Sindou area in western Burkina Faso. He is the maternal uncle of Ibrahim Traoré, who instigated the September 2022 Burkina Faso coup d'état. Coulibaly spent his entire career as a soldier in the Burkina Faso Armed Forces (FAB), where he reached the rank of colonel-major. He was a peacekeeper who worked in the United Nations–African Union Mission in Darfur and collaborated with international organizations like NATO and ECOWAS.

After the September 2022 that brought Traore to power, Coulibaly was appointed Minister of Defense and Veterans Affairs with the rank of Minister of State on October 25, 2022. He was part of the transitional government of Apollinaire J. Kyélem de Tambèla. Coulibaly was one of three members of the government with a military background, including Augustin Kaboré and Boukaré Zoungrana, the ministers of Environment and Energy and Territorial Administration respectively. Coulibaly's main priority as defense minister was halting and reversing jihadist gains amid the Islamist insurgency in Burkina Faso. He referred to the insurgency as a "war ... for the survival of the nation." Coulibaly officially took office on November 3, 2022.

In April 2023, amid a lack of resources in the Burkinabe army, Coulibaly launched the "empty attics" campaign to encourage off-duty and retired soldiers to donate equipment and uniforms to new recruits. Coulibaly supported Traore's call for a general mobilization that same month. In May 2023, following several violations of Burkinabe airspace, Coulibaly denounced the existence of an "international coalition" against Burkina Faso which he said came about after Burkinabe rapprochement with Russia. He denied Russian influence in the country as well as denying the presence of Wagner Group fighters. In October 2023, Traore promoted Coulibaly to brigadier general.

After the dismissal of the Tambela government in December 2024, Coulibaly was not reappointed to his position in the Ouédraogo government. He was succeeded by Célestin Simpore. Coulibaly largely failed to curb the advances of Jama'at Nusrat al-Islam wal-Muslimin and the Islamic State during his two years as defense minister. However, he was the main proponent of restructuring the Burkinabe army around Rapid Intervention Battalions. On March 5, 2025, Coulibaly was appointed Burkinabe ambassador to the United States, officially taking up his duties on July 24.
