= Agacher Strip War =

1985 war fought by Burkina Faso and Mali

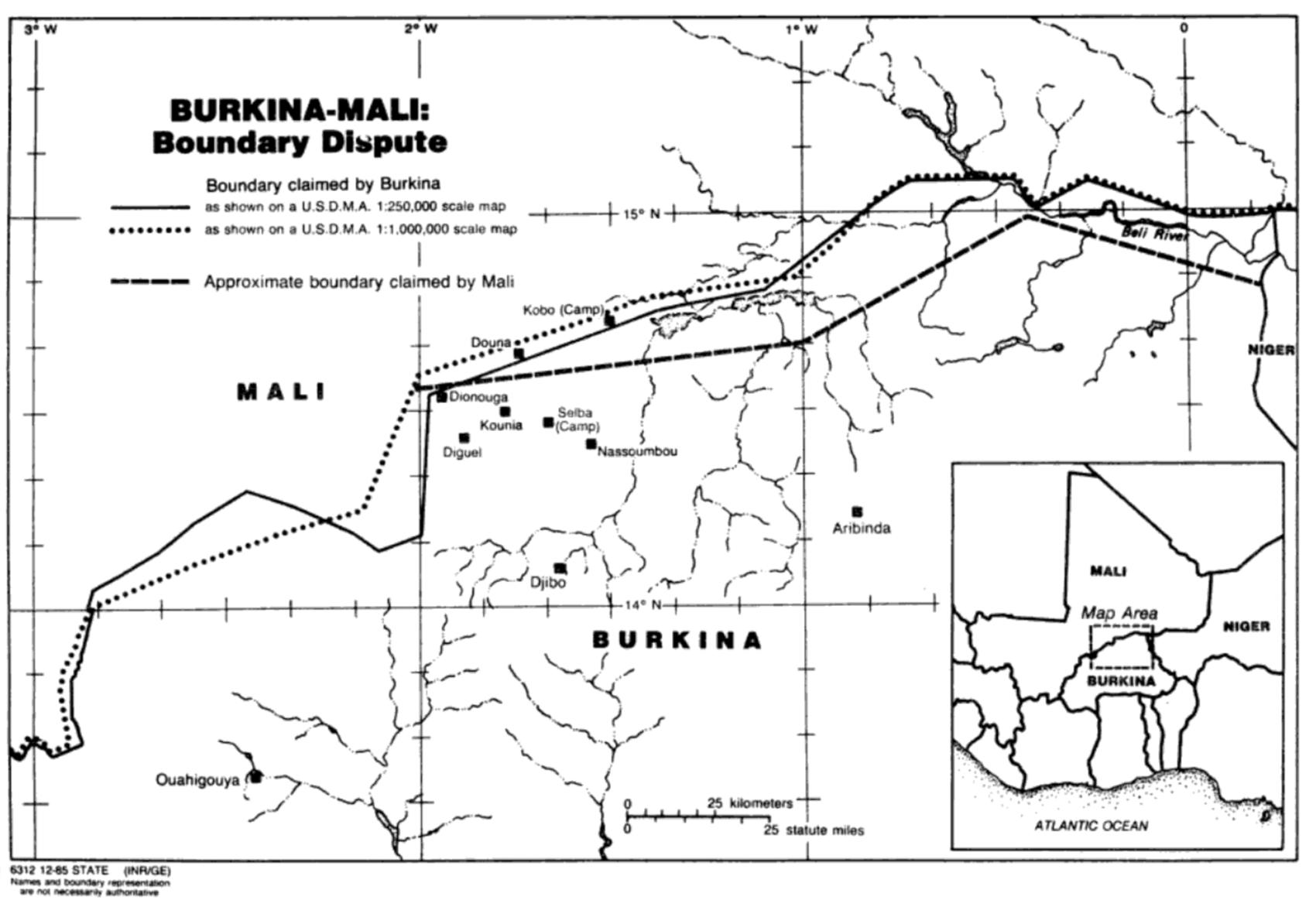
- United States Department of State map showing the competing claims of Mali and Burkina Faso in the Agacher Strip
Date	25–30 December 1985
Location	Mali and Burkina Faso
Result	Ceasefire
Territorial changes	Agacher Strip is divided between the claimants

Belligerents
Mali	Burkina Faso

Commanders and leaders
Moussa Traoré; Bougary Sangaré; Kokè Dembéle; Kafougouna Koné; Souleymane Daffé	Thomas Sankara; Blaise Compaoré

Casualties and losses
~40 soldiers and civilians killed 2 soldiers captured	100+ soldiers and civilians killed 16 soldiers captured

The Agacher Strip War (French: Guerre de la Bande d’Agacher), also known as the Christmas War (French: Guerre de Noël), was a brief conflict fought by Burkina Faso and Mali over a 160-kilometre-long (100 mi) strip of land along the border in northern Burkina Faso from 25 to 30 December 1985. The war ended in a ceasefire. The Agacher Strip had been subject to a border dispute between Mali and Burkina Faso since the 1960s. Following armed clashes in 1974, both countries agreed to mediation to resolve their differences. Progress on a solution stalled, and in 1983 Burkinabé President Thomas Sankara and Malian President Moussa Traoré decided to have the border dispute settled by the International Court of Justice and subsequently petitioned the body to resolve the issue.

In 1985, tensions rose between the Burkinabé and Malian governments as Sankara called for a revolution in Mali while Traoré's regime struggled to manage social unrest. After Burkinabé officials conducted a census in disputed border communities, Malian forces launched an offensive on 25 December with aircraft and tanks. Overwhelmed by Mali's superior firepower, Burkinabé forces lost control of the Agacher border communities and resorted to guerrilla tactics to stall Malian tanks. Mali subsequently occupied most of the Agacher Strip, while both countries conducted raids on each other's locales. A ceasefire was reached on 30 December, and in early 1986 successful mediation by West African countries resulted in an agreement between Sankara and Traoré to avoid further hostilities. The relatively poor performance of Burkina Faso during the war damaged the credibility of its revolutionary rulers and led them to project a more moderate international image. In Mali, the war added to the country's economic difficulties but boosted the popularity of Traoré's struggling regime. The International Court of Justice later ruled the Agacher Strip to be split among the two countries, a settlement which both accepted.

== Background and border dispute ==
In 1919, France reorganised its colonial administration in French West Africa and created the new colony of Upper Volta, splitting it off of Upper Senegal and Niger. The colony was abolished in 1932 and merged with surrounding territories until France decided to restore it in 1947. The Republic of Upper Volta and the Republic of Mali were granted independence in 1960. In north-eastern Upper Volta, an approximately 160-kilometre-long (100 mi) portion of land bordered to the north by Mali and Niger to the east and centered around the Béli River was subject to a territorial dispute. The border in the area—known as the Agacher Strip—was drawn using old French maps but never fully demarcated as French colonial ordinances had not carefully delineated the frontier. Upper Volta relied on colonial borders to stake its territorial claims; maps dating from 1920 showed several border communities within the colony of Upper Volta. Mali relied on ethnic arguments; Malian people had established several communities in the region to take advantage of grazing land. The Agacher was also rumored to possess valuable manganese deposits, though there was little evidence that these actually existed.

The lack of full demarcation first led to a dispute among riverine peoples along the Béli in 1961. In 1968, a joint Upper Volta-Mali commission was established in an attempt to reach an agreement, but the group did not make any progress. A period of drought and the ensuing population displacement in the region further escalated tensions. In 1974, a brief armed conflict broke out between the two countries over the border dispute. In response, the Organization of African Unity (OAU) created a mediation commission to resolve the disagreement and provide for an independent, neutral demarcation of the border. Both the Malian and Upper Voltan governments declared that they would not use armed force to end the dispute. In 1977, Upper Volta, Mali, and several other francophone West African states signed a mutual defense pact, the Non-Aggression and Defense Aid Agreement (ANAD).

By 1983, Upper Volta and Mali were in disagreement about the work of the OAU commission. On 4 August, Captain Thomas Sankara and other military officers launched a coup in Upper Volta. Sankara became president, and the officers established the Conseil National de la Revolution (CNR) to rule the country in a left-leaning, revolutionary fashion. He personally disliked Malian President Moussa Traoré, who had taken power by deposing Modibo Keïta's left-leaning regime. On 17 September 1983, Sankara, a veteran of the 1974 border clashes, visited Mali and met with Traoré. With Algerian mediation, the two agreed to have the border dispute settled by the International Court of Justice (ICJ) and subsequently petitioned the body to resolve the issue. At the same time, a new joint commission for bilateral cooperation was established, and the following month, Upper Volta lifted its veto to allow Mali to join the West African Economic and Monetary Union as a conciliatory measure. In August 1984, the CNR changed the name of Upper Volta to Burkina Faso. On 3 April 1985, the ICJ began examining the border dispute.

== Prelude ==
Low rainfall in Mali created a severe drought in 1984, forcing Malian ranchers to drive their cattle south into northern Burkina Faso in search of water and adequate grazing land. This led to conflict with local crop farmers. In July 1985, Burkina Faso declared the Malian secretary general of the Economic Community of West Africa, Drissa Keita, a persona non grata after he criticised Sankara's regime. In September Sankara delivered a speech in which he called for a revolution in Mali. Malian leaders were particularly sensitive to the inflammatory rhetoric, as their country was experiencing social unrest. Around the same time Sankara and other key figures in the CNR became convinced that Traoré was harbouring opposition to the Burkinabé regime in Bamako and plotting to provoke a border war which would be used to support a counterrevolution. In October Burkina Faso and Mali filed their first briefs with the ICJ concerning the boundary dispute.

Tensions at the border first began to rise on 24 November when one Burkinabé national killed another near the border in Soum Province. Malian police crossed the boundary to arrest the murderer and also detained several members of a local Committee for the Defense of the Revolution who were preparing a tribunal. Three days later Malian police entered Kounia to "restore order". Burkina Faso made diplomatic representations on the incidents to Mali, but was given no formal response. At the beginning of December Burkina Faso informed Mali and other surrounding countries that it was conducting its decennial national census from 10 to 20 December. On 14 December military personnel entered the Agacher to assist with the census. Mali accused the military authorities of pressuring Malian citizens in the border villages of Dionouga, Sebba, Kounia, and Douna to register with the census, a charge which Burkina Faso disputed. Dionouga, Sebba, and Kounia lay on the Burkinabé side of the disputed area, while Douna was under Malian jurisdiction. In Dionouga Malian nationals threw stones at the Burkinabé census personnel. In response, a few Burkina Faso Armed Forces units were sent into the three Burkinabé-administered villages. Malian police confronted the military personnel and, in an attempt to reduce tensions, ANAD dispatched a delegation to Bamako and Ouagadougou to mediate. President of Algeria Chadli Bendjedid also contacted Sankara and Traoré to encourage a peaceful resolution. At the request of ANAD members, Burkina Faso announced the withdrawal of all military personnel from the disputed region. Not all troops were withdrawn before hostilities broke out.

Despite the declared withdrawal, a "war of the communiques" ensued as Burkinabé and Malian authorities exchanged hostile messages with one another. The Malian government accused Burkina Faso of harassing local customary chiefs and forcing its nationals to accept Burkinabé identity cards. During the same time period the Malian Government was threatened with a national strike by educators over delays in compensation. Under pressure from labour unions and student activists, the government contravened its previous position—that there were no funds for wages—and paid the teachers. Feeling threatened by Sankara, Traoré began preparing Mali for hostilities with Burkina Faso. Three Groupements Opérationnels Tactiques were formed to attack the country: one in the north led by Army Chief of Staff Colonel Kokè Dembéle, one in the center led by Kafougouna Koné, and one in the south led by Souleymane Daffé. The groupements were to invade Burkina Faso and converge on the city of Bobo-Dioulasso. Once there, they would rally Burkinabé opposition forces to take Ouagadougou and overthrow Sankara. According to an analyses by the United States Central Intelligence Agency, it was also hoped that a war would distract the Malian populace from their country's troubled economy. Former Sankara aide Paul Michaud wrote that the Burkinabé president had actually intended to provoke Mali into conflict with the aim of mobilising popular support for his regime. According to him "an official—and reliable—Malian source" had reported that mobilisation documents dating to 19 December were found on the bodies of fallen Burkinabé soldiers during the ensuing war. On 20 December Malian Air Force MiG-21s and helicopters began patrolling the border.

== War ==
At dawn on 25 December 1985, a day during which most Burkinabé were celebrating Christmas, about 150 Malian Army tanks crossed the frontier and attacked several locations. Malian troops also attempted to envelope Bobo-Dioulasso in a pincer attack. The Burkina Faso Army struggled to repel the offensive in the face of superior Malian firepower and were overwhelmed on the northern front; Malian forces quickly secured the towns of Dionouga, Selba, Kouna, and Douna in the Agacher. The garrison in Dionouga was overwhelmed; 15 Burkinabé soldiers were captured while they slept and the rest were forced to retreat. At about 08:45 two Malian MiG-21s bombed Djibo, Ouahigouya and Nassoumbo.

The Burkinabé Government in Ouagadougou received word of hostilities at about 13:00 and immediately issued mobilisation orders. Various security measures were also imposed across the country, including nighttime blackouts. Burkinabé forces regrouped in the Dionouga area to counter-attack. Captain Blaise Compaoré took command of this western front. Under his leadership soldiers split into small groups and employed guerrilla tactics against Malian tanks, successfully capturing two. Burkina Faso deployed the National Police to reinforce the army, which was also joined by some armed Committees for the Defense of the Revolution and militia units. Mali mitigated Burkinabé counterattacks by conducting sorties with its MiG-21s, and Burkina Faso attempted to counter them by launching its sole MiG-17, though no air-to-air engagements occurred. Burkina Faso retaliated against the bombing of its towns on 26 December by conducting airstrikes on Sikasso, killing four Malians and injuring four others. Burkinabé forces also raided the Malian town of Zégoua, several hundred kilometres away from the Agacher, claiming to have killed 15 Malian soldiers and destroyed two "military targets".

Burkina Faso accused Mali of conducting its offensive with the aid of an unnamed imperialist power and said that the conflict was "no longer a question of territorial claim but a direct open war between forces of reaction and revolution, between retrogression and the progressive Burkinabé Government." Burkinabé official media claimed that white soldiers were fighting alongside Malian forces. There were also rumours that Burkinabé exiles such as Lona Charles Ouattara were aiding the Malians. Radio Bamako countered by denouncing Burkina Faso as a country led by "thoughtless and misguided people". Though Burkina Faso had a mutual defence pact with Ghana since 1983, Ghanaian leader Jerry Rawlings chose not into invoke it. Despite its close relations with Sankara's government, Libya also refrained from aiding Burkina Faso.

Immediately after hostilities began other African leaders attempted to institute a truce. One agreement was proposed by Libyan Foreign Minister Ali Treki with Nigerian officials, which included the establishment of a military observer force at the border including personnel from both of their countries. Another settlement was created by President of Senegal and Organization of African Unity Chairman Abdou Diouf in tandem with President of Côte d'Ivoire Félix Houphouët-Boigny, President of Togo Gnassingbé Eyadéma, President of Benin Mathieu Kérékou, and President of Niger Seyni Kountché. Mali and Burkina Faso pledged to adhere to a ceasefire beginning at midnight on 27 December, but this was immediately abandoned.

On 28 December a Malian detachment of 14 tanks and armoured cars escorted by 76 infantrymen staged an attack on the border village of Koloko. Moving along the Sikasso road, Burkinabé forces intercepted it at Mahon, 20 kilometres (12 mi) from the border. Mali reported that one of its soldiers was killed and eight wounded in the raid. The Malian Air Force also attacked Djibo, Ouahigouya, Tougan, and Dédougou in retaliation for the air raids against Sikasso. The Democratic Union of the Malian People, the state party of Mali, claimed the attacks inflicted significant damage and loss of life. Meanwhile, Burkinabé commandos attempted to cut off Malian forward units from their support in the rear. On the morning of 30 December Burkina Faso and Mali agreed to an ANAD-brokered ceasefire.

By the time the truce was reached Mali had occupied most of the Agacher Strip. Over 100 Burkinabé and approximately 40 Malian soldiers and civilians were killed during the war. In addition to this, both belligerents executed some of their prisoners of war in violation of international standards. Sixteen Burkinabé and two Malian soldiers were held as prisoners of war. Official statistics given list the casualties as 48 Burkinabé and 11 Malians killed. Burkina Faso claimed to have destroyed four Malian tanks. The Burkinabé towns of Ouahigouya, Djibo, and Nassambou were left badly damaged by the fighting.

== Aftermath ==
=== Effects on Mali and Burkina Faso ===
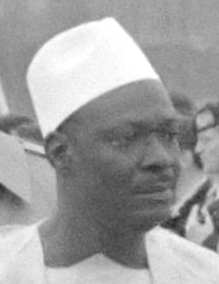
The war improved the popularity of Malian President Moussa Traoré's regime.

The conflict was quickly dubbed the "War of the Poor" by the international press; Burkina Faso and Mali were among the poorest states in the world. In its aftermath officials from the International Committee of the Red Cross were allowed by both belligerents to visit prisoners of war. On 4 January 1986 Sankara presented military decorations to veterans of the conflict and publicly displayed several captured Malian armoured vehicles: two tanks and three other vehicles. One Malian tank of Daffé's southern groupement was put on display at Ouagadougou Airport. The tank had been abandoned in Burkina Faso after being damaged in a firefight during the initial invasion and was left behind after the Chief of the General Staff Bougary Sangaré prohibited a recovery mission while negotiations were ongoing. Sangaré and Dembéle were both arrested after the war. Traoré then held a postwar conference with the leaders of the armed forces at the National Police School. As a result of the tank incident, it was decided at the meeting to demote Sangaré from general to the rank of colonel and forcibly retire him, and discharge two lower officers from the army. Dembéle was also dismissed.

Burkina Faso declared that the war was part of an "international plot" to bring down Sankara's government. It also rejected speculation that it was fought over rumoured mineral wealth in the Agacher. The country's relatively poor performance in the conflict damaged the domestic credibility of the CNR. Some Burkinabé soldiers were angered by Sankara's failure to prosecute the war more aggressively and rally a counteroffensive against Mali. It also demonstrated the country's weak international position and forced the CNR to craft a more moderate image of its policies and goals abroad. The Burkinabé Government made little reference to supporting revolution in other countries in the conflict's aftermath, while its relations with France modestly improved. At a rally held after the war, Sankara conceded that his country's military was not adequately armed and announced the commutation of sentences for numerous political prisoners. Burkina Faso subsequently acquired additional combat aircraft.

In Mali, the war added to the country's economic difficulties but boosted the popularity of Traoré's struggling regime. During the conflict, Malian foreign embassies were flooded with expatriates offering to volunteer for wartime service, businessmen abroad donated 100 million CFA francs to the government in support of the war effort, and migrant workers in Côte d'Ivoire remitted about 500 million CFA francs. Malians also donated cattle, butter, rice, and petrol to the regime. Despite the appeals for national unity during the war, in his New Year's message broadcast over Radio Mali, Traoré declared that there was a fifth column in the country and that Malian teachers had connections with Sankara. The police subsequently arrested seven people over suspicions that they were agents of the Burkinabé government. Six of them were later charged with "insulting the head of state, rumour-mongering, conspiracy and harbouring a fugitive."

=== Resolution of the border dispute ===
As per the ceasefire, a 16-member West African observer force was dispatched to the Agacher to monitor the border. It was withdrawn before the end of January 1986. One Ivorian helicopter crashed while overseeing the ceasefire. On 8 January the Red Cross oversaw the exchange of the two captured Malian soldiers and one interned Malian civilian for the 16 captive Burkinabé soldiers. At an ANAD summit in Yamoussoukro on 17 January Traoré and Sankara met and formalised an agreement to end hostilities. On 26 February 15 captured Malian civilians were exchanged for eight Burkinabé civilians in Bamako, marking the second and last of the prisoner exchanges. In March an Economic Community of West Africa summit was held in Ouagadougou and attended by both Sankara and Traoré. As a sign of reconciliation, the participants elected another Malian to replace the outgoing secretary general of the organisation. Mali and Burkina Faso reestablished formal diplomatic relations in June.

Following the ceasefire Burkina Faso and Mali both petitioned the ICJ to impose interim measures to prevent further conflict until the court delivered its decision. Burkina Faso claimed that it had been the victim of Malian aggression, while Mali argued that it acted in self-defence by responding to Burkinabé occupation of its territory. Burkina Faso requested the ordered withdrawal of all troops from the region, but Mali argued this contravened the terms of the ANAD truce. The court responded by advising both parties to continue mediation under ANAD's auspices, work out a troop withdrawal agreement, and take all measures to avoid conflict pending the adjudication of the border dispute. The parties began their oral arguments before the ICJ in June, and the court issued a ruling on the matter by a five-member panel of judges on 22 December 1986. The court split the disputed territory among the parties; Mali received the more-densely populated western portion and Burkina Faso the eastern section centered on the Béli. Both countries indicated their satisfaction with the judgement.

=== Legacy ===
In Burkina Faso the conflict is often remembered as the "Christmas War". The Agacher Strip War remains the only full-fledged interstate war to be fought over territory in West Africa since European decolonisation.

== Works cited ==
- Adebajo, Adekeye (2002). Building Peace in West Africa: Liberia, Sierra Leone, and Guinea-Bissau. Boulder: Lynne Rienner Publishers. ISBN 9781588260772.
- Deng, Francis M.; Zartman, I. William (2004). A Strategic Vision for Africa: The Kampala Movement. Washington, D.C.: Brookings Institution Press. ISBN 9780815798439.
- Englebert, Pierre (2018). Burkina Faso: Unsteady Statehood In West Africa. New York: Routledge. ISBN 9780429970481.
- Harsch, Ernest (2014). Thomas Sankara: An African Revolutionary (illustrated, reprint ed.). Athens: Ohio University Press. ISBN 9780821445075.
- Hodson, H. V., ed. (1986). Annual Register: World Events In 1986. Essex: Longman. ISBN 9780582503335.
- Imperato, Pascal James (2019). Mali: A Search For Direction. New York: Routledge. ISBN 9780429718106.
- Johnson, Segun (1 July 1986). "Burkina-Mali War: Is Nigeria Still a Regional Power". India Quarterly: A Journal of International Affairs. 42 (3): 294–308. doi:10.1177/097492848604200306. S2CID 154699898.
- Kacowicz, Arie Marcelo (1998). Zones of Peace in the Third World: South America and West Africa in Comparative Perspective. Albany: SUNY Press. ISBN 9780791439579.
- Naldi, Gino J. (October 1986). "Case concerning the Frontier Dispute between Burkina Faso and Mali: Provisional Measures of Protection". The International and Comparative Law Quarterly. 35 (4): 970–975. doi:10.1093/iclqaj/35.4.970. JSTOR 759886.
- Peterson, Brian (2018). "The Perils of Non-Alignment: Thomas Sankara and the Cold War". In Murrey, Amber (ed.). A Certain Amount of Madness : The Life, Politics and Legacies of Thomas Sankara (first ed.). London: Pluto Press. pp. 36–50. ISBN 9780745337586.
- Peterson, Brian (2021). Thomas Sankara: A Revolutionary in Cold War Africa. Bloomington: Indiana University Press. ISBN 978-0253053763.
- Rupley, Lawrence; Bangali, Lamissa; Diamitani, Boureima (2013). Historical Dictionary of Burkina Faso (revised ed.). Lanham: Rowman & Littlefield. ISBN 9780810867703.
- Salliot, Emmanuel (2010), A review of past security events in the Sahel 1967–2007 (PDF), Security Implications of Climate Change in the Sahel Region, Sahel and West Africa Club Secretariat, archived from the original on 20 February 2023
- Uwechue, Ralph (1991). Africa Today (second ed.). London: Africa Books Limited. ISBN 9780903274166.
- Weeramantry, Cristopher G. (1996). "Access to information: a new human right. The Right to Know". In Yusuf, Abdulqawi A. (ed.). African Yearbook of International Law (in English and French). Vol. 3. Dordrecht: Martinus Nijhoff Publishers. pp. 99–125. ISBN 9789041102683.
