= Comparative gendarmerie enlisted ranks of Francophone countries =

Rank comparison chart of officers for gendarmeries of Francophone states. In France and some Francophone nations, the gendarmerie is a branch of the armed forces that is responsible for internal security in parts of the territory (primarily in rural areas and small towns in the case of France), with additional duties as military police for the armed forces. In the mid-twentieth century, a number of former French mandates and colonial possessions adopted gendarmeries after independence.

== History ==
Through the French colonial empire the gendarmerie was employed as a military and policing force throughout French colonies, with Gendarmes from France being deployed in every colony in 1900. The gendarmerie would also recruit personnel from the local populations, entrenching the idea of a gendarmerie in the colonial societies.

In the mid-twentieth century, a number of former French mandates and colonial possessions adopted gendarmeries after independence. These included Algeria, Chad, Djibouti, the Ivory Coast, Lebanon, Madagascar, Morocco, Senegal, Syria, Tunisia, and the Republic of the Congo.

== Enlisted ==
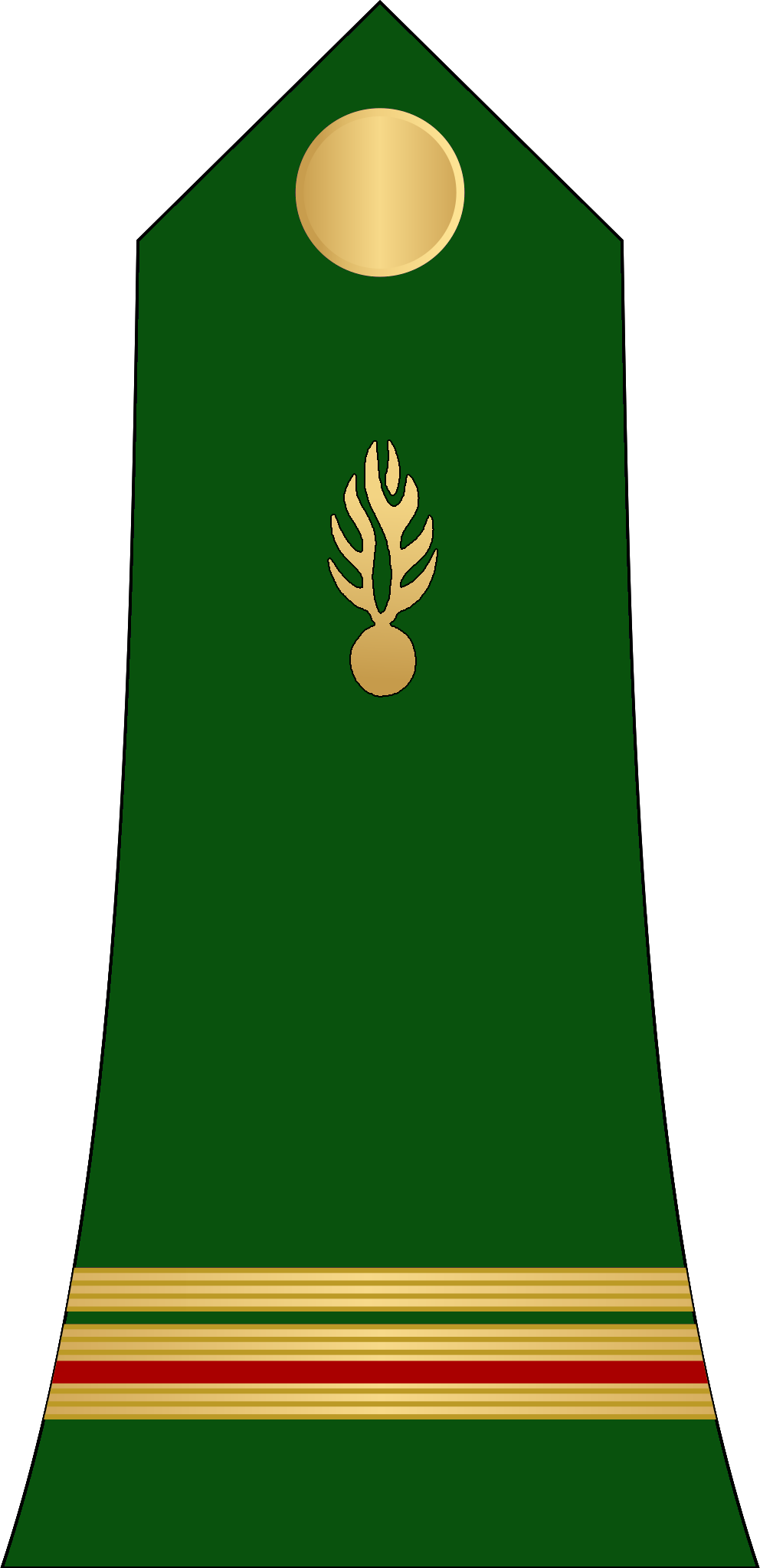
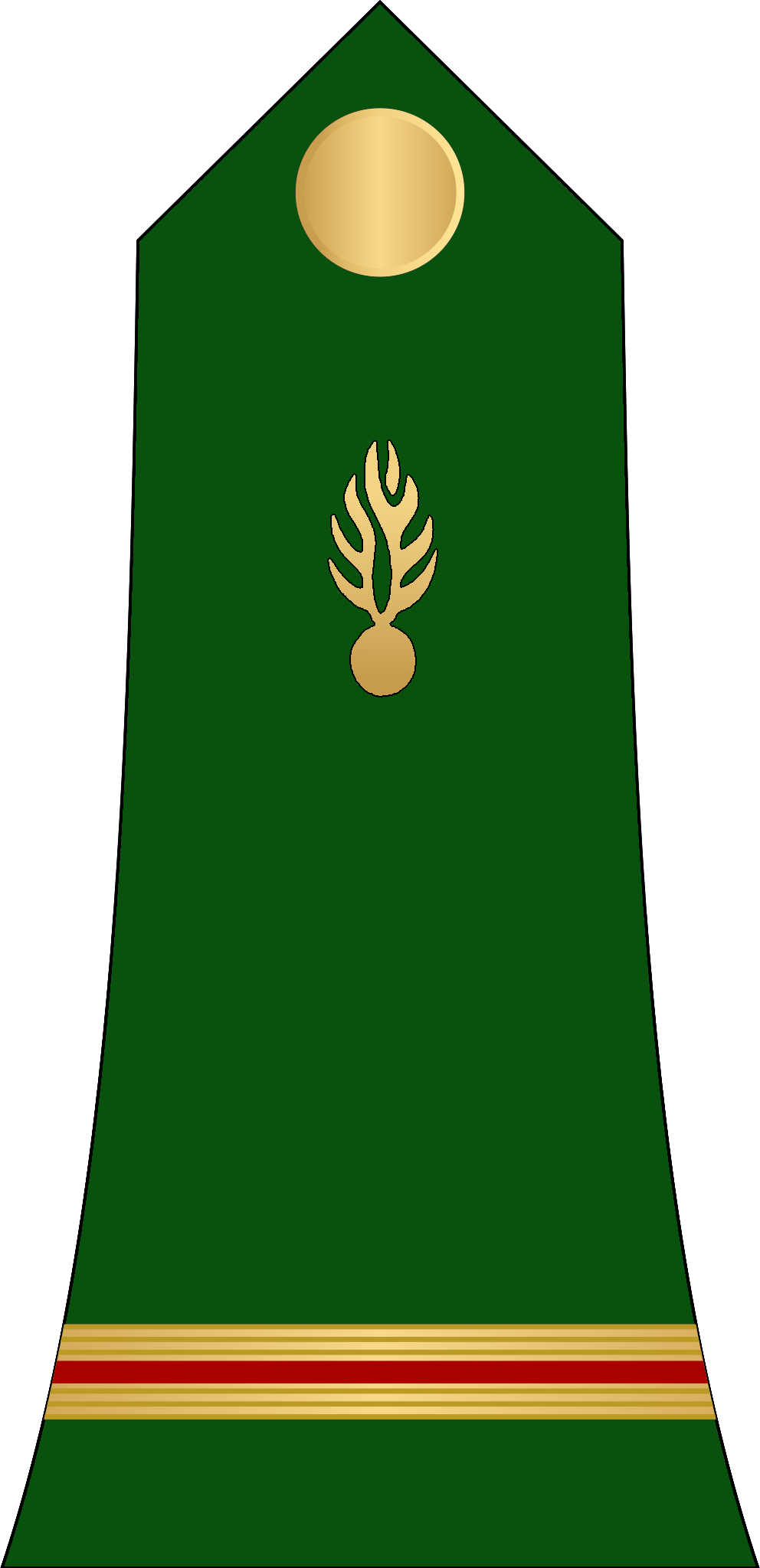
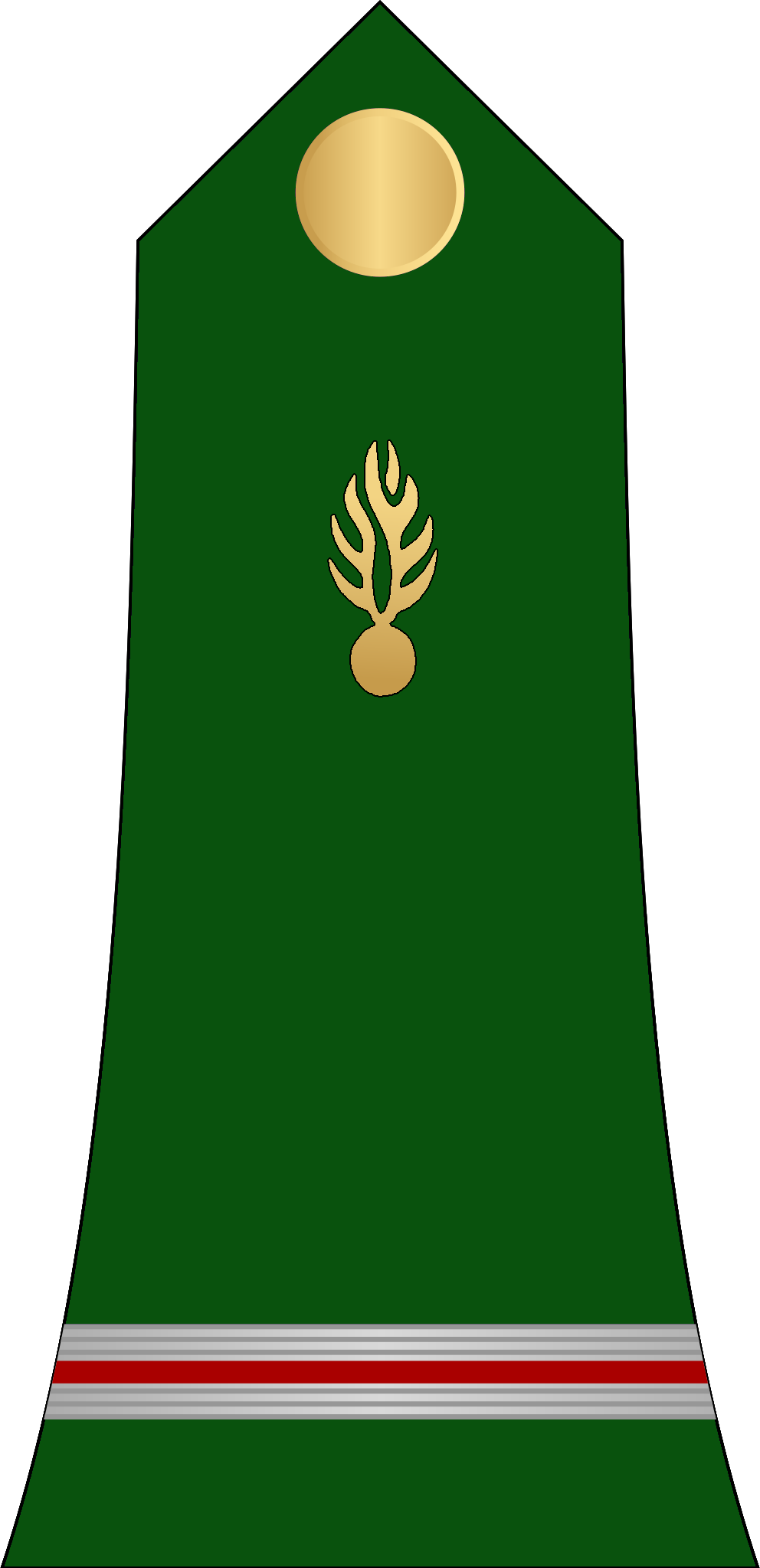
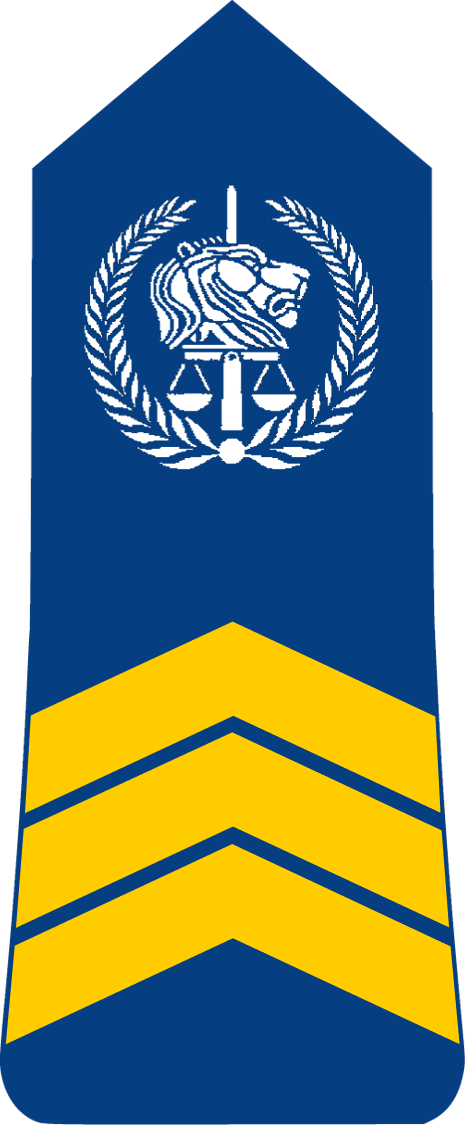
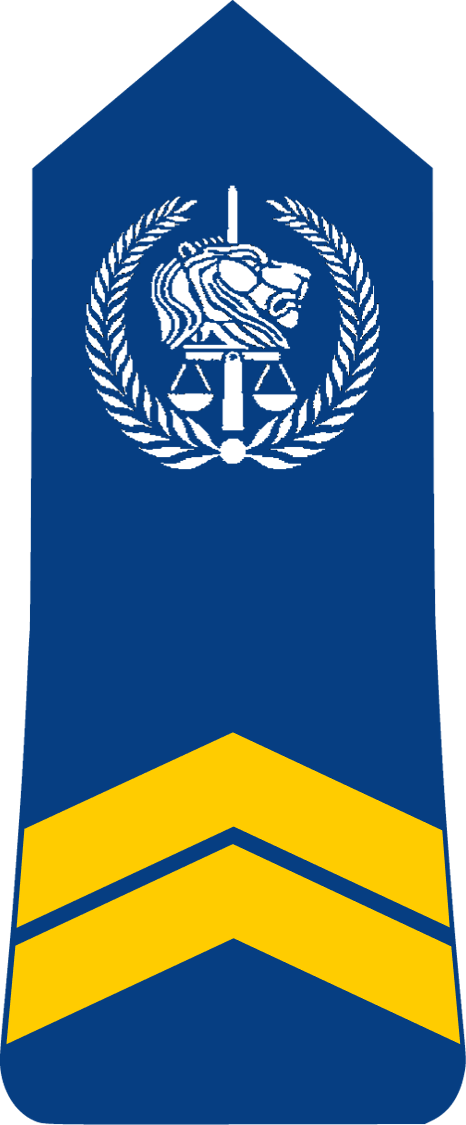
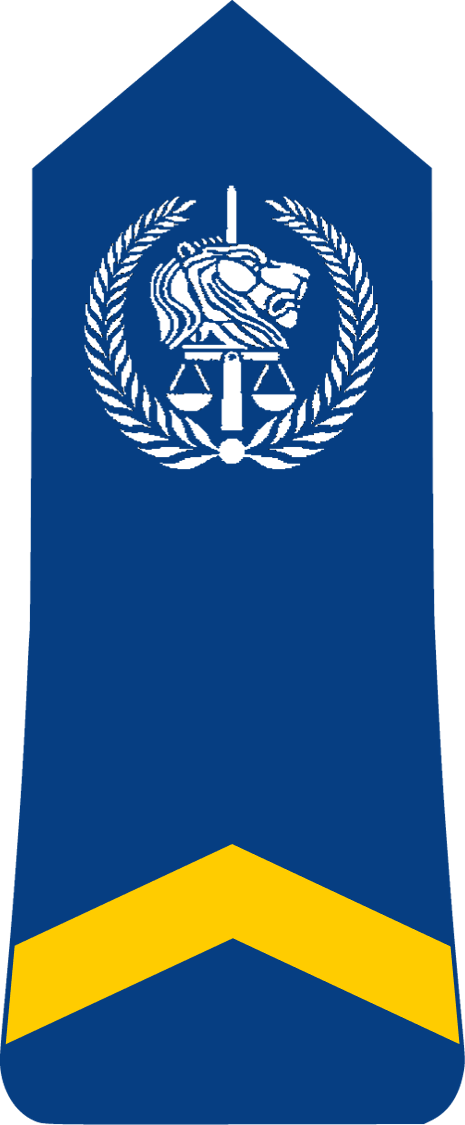
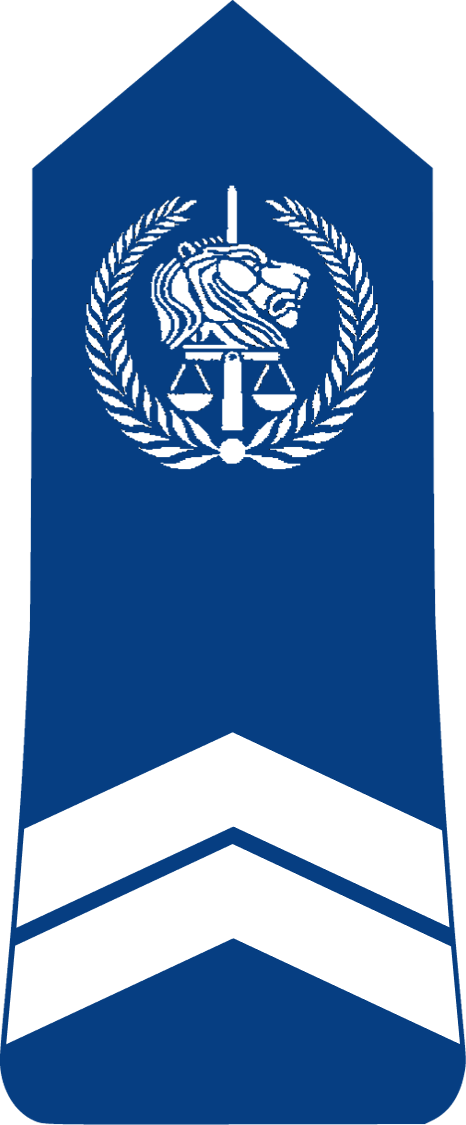
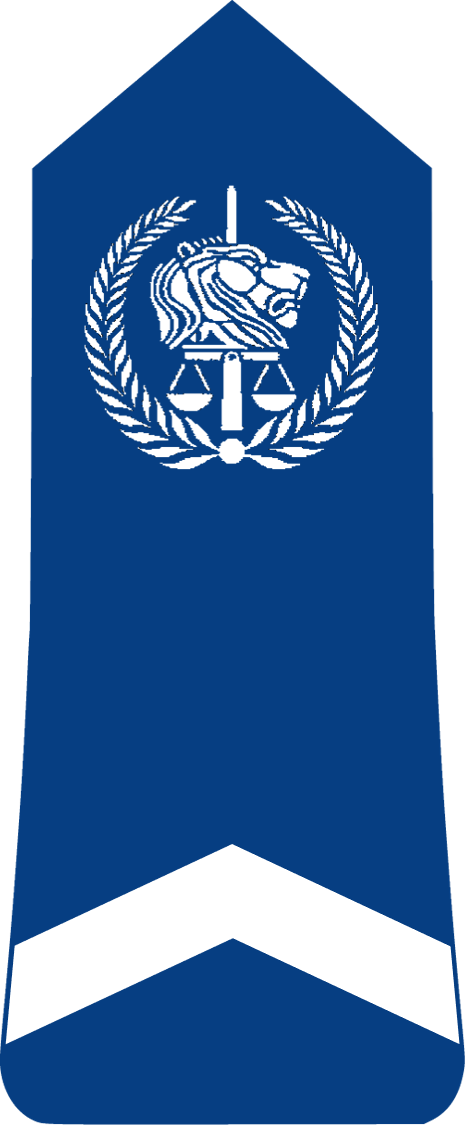
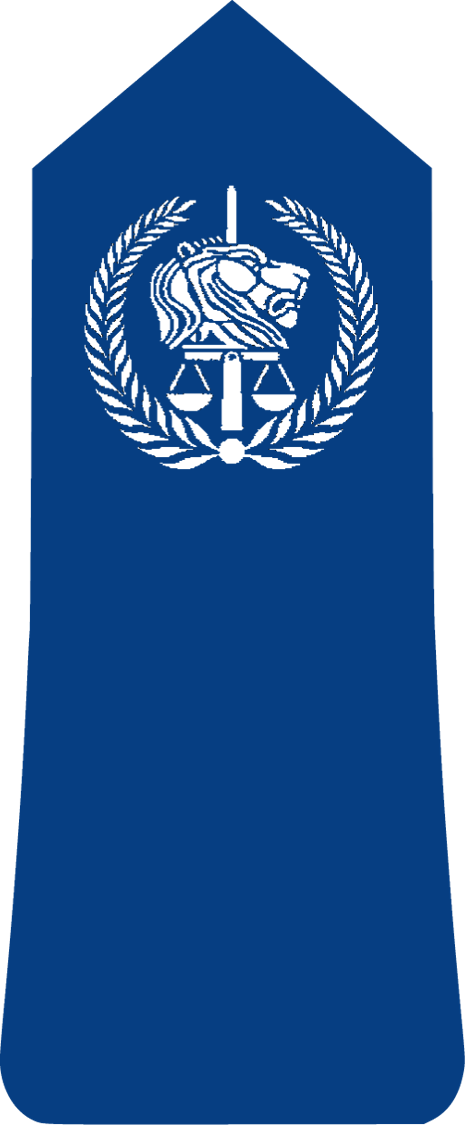
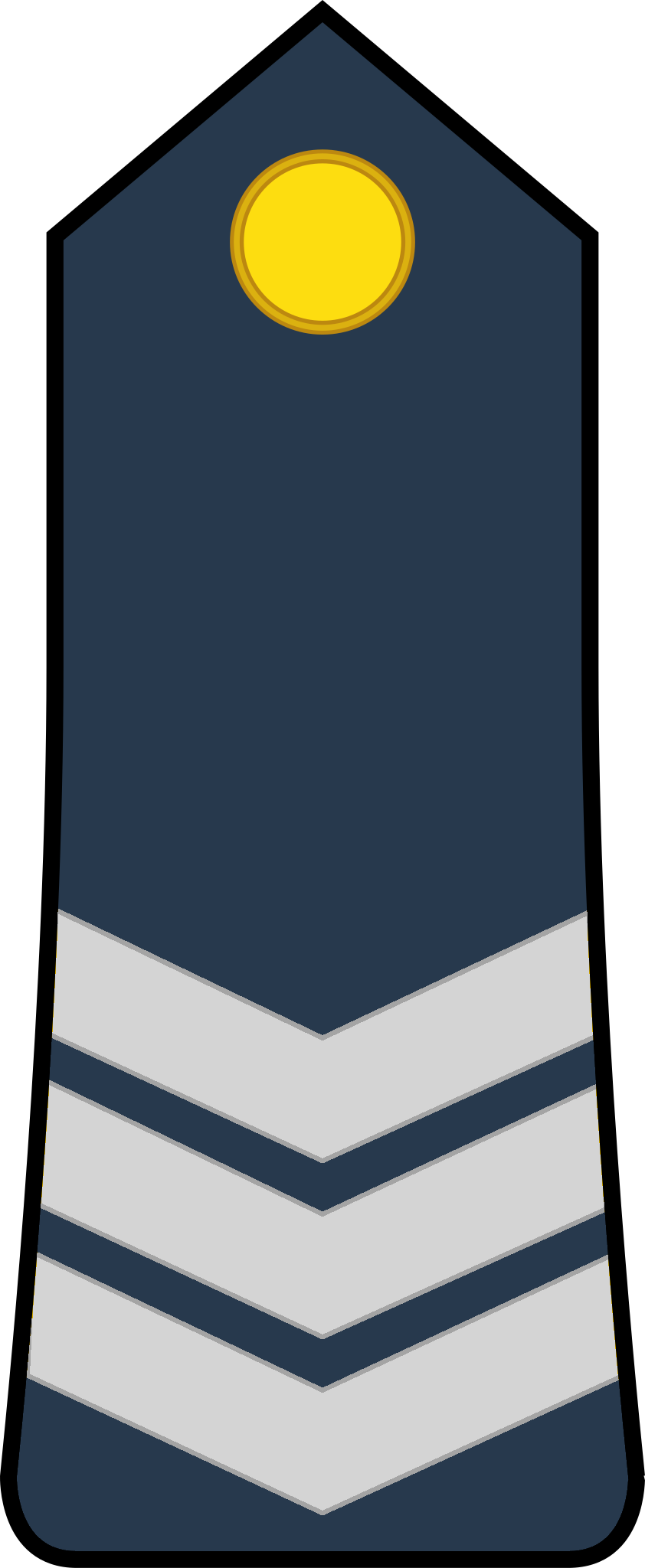
Rank group	Senior NCOs								Junior NCOs		Enlisted
(Cameroon) Cameroonian National Gendarmerie
(Cameroon) Cameroonian National Gendarmerie	Adjudant-chef major	Adjudant-chef	Adjudant		Maréchal-des-logis-chef	Maréchal-des-logis			Gendarme major		Gendarme	Elève Gendarme
Royal Canadian Mounted Police												No insignia
Royal Canadian Mounted Police	Corps sergeant major	Sergeant major	Staff sergeant major	Staff sergeant	Sergeant					Corporal		Constable	Cadet
Royal Canadian Mounted Police	Sergent-major du corps	Sergent-major	Sergent-major d'état major	Sergent d'état-major	Sergent					Caporal		Gendarme	Cadet
Chadian National Gendarmerie
Chadian National Gendarmerie				Sergent major	Sergent-chef	Sergent				Caporal	Soldat première	Soldat
Congolese Gendarmerie												No insignia
Congolese Gendarmerie	Adjudant-chef		Adjudant		Maréchal des logis-chef	Maréchal des logis						Èleve gendarme
(Djibouti) Djiboutian National Gendarmerie
(Djibouti) Djiboutian National Gendarmerie	Major	Adjudant-chef	Adjudant		Marechal des Logis-chef	Gendarme principal			Gendarme de 1^{ère} classe	Gendarme de 2^{ème} classe		Elève gendarme
(France) French Gendarmerie
(France) French Gendarmerie	Major	Adjudant-chef	Adjudant		Maréchal-des-logis-chef	Gendarme	Gendarme sous contrat	Gendarme Adjoint Maréchal-des-logis	Gendarme Adjoint Brigadier Chef	Gendarme Adjoint Brigadier	Gendarme Adjoint première classe	Gendarme Adjoint
Ivory Coast Gendarmerie
Ivory Coast Gendarmerie	Adjudant-chef major	Adjudant-chef	Adjudant		Maréchal des Logis-Chef	Maréchal des Logis			Brigadier-Chef	Brigadier	Gendarme élève
Army of Monaco
Army of Monaco	Adjudant-chef		Adjudant	Maréchal-des-logis-major	Maréchal-des-logis-chef	Maréchal-des-logis				Brigadier	Carabinier de première classe	Carabinier de deuxième classe
Senegalese Gendarmerie
Senegalese Gendarmerie	Adjutant-major	Adjutant-chef	Adjutant		Maréchal des logis-chef	Maréchal des logis					Gendarme
(Togo) Togolese National Gendarmerie
(Togo) Togolese National Gendarmerie	Major	Adjudant-chef	Adjudant		Maréchal-des-logis-chef	Maréchal-des-logis			Gendarme adjoint		Eleve gendarme
Vanuatu Mobile Forces
Vanuatu Mobile Forces	Warrant officer class 1		Warrant officer class 2	Staff sergeant	Sergeant				Corporal	Lance corporal	Constable	Recruit
Vanuatu Mobile Forces				Staf Sajen	Sajen				Kofol		Polis	Rikrut
Rank group	Senior NCOs								Junior NCOs		Enlisted

== Works cited ==
- Lutterbeck, Derek (2018) [2013]. The Paradox of Gendarmeries: Between Expansion, Demilitarization and Dissolution (PDF) (Report). DCAF. doi:10.5334/bbs. ISBN 978-1-911529-35-4. ISSN 2571-9297.
