= Chief of General Staff (Burkina Faso) =

Professional head of the Burkina Faso Armed Forces

Chief of the General Staff
- Chef d'état-major de l'armée du Burkina Faso (French)
- Incumbent; Brigadier General Moussa Diallo since 31 December 2024
- Member of: Burkina Faso Armed Forces
- Reports to: Minister of War and Patriotic Defense

The Chief of General Staff (French: Chef d'état-major de l'armée du Burkina Faso) is the professional head of the Burkina Faso Armed Forces. They are responsible for the administration and the operational control of the Burkinabe military. It is the highest ranked military position in the country.

== List ==
No.	Portrait	Name (born–died)	Term of office			Ref.
No.	Portrait	Name (born–died)	Took office	Left office	Time in office	Ref.
		Sangoulé Lamizana (1916–2005)	1 November 1961			
		General; Bila Zagré (1916–2005)	1979	1980	0–1 years	
		Gabriel Somé Yorian (1935–1989)	1980	May 1983	2–3 years	
		Major; Jean-Baptiste Boukary Lingani (1935–1989)	4 August 1983	18 September 1989	6 years, 45 days	
		General; Ali Traoré (?–?)	2003	2011	7–8 years	
		General; Honoré Traoré (1957–2026)	2011	13 August 2014	2–3 years	
		Brigadier General; Pingrénoma Zagré (?–?)	December 2014	29 December 2016	2 years	
		Colonel Major; Oumarou Sadou (?–?)	29 December 2016	January 2019	2 years	
		General; Moïse Miningou (?–?)	January 2019	October 2021	2 years, 9 months	
		Brigadier General; Gilbert Noël Ouédraogo (born 1968)	October 2021	February 2022	4 months	
		Colonel Major; David Kabré (born 1968 )	February 2022	30 March 2023	1 year, 1 month	
		Colonel Major; Célestin Simpore (born 1968 )	30 March 2023	31 December 2024	1 year, 276 days	
		Brigadier General; Moussa Diallo (born 1968 )	31 December 2024	Incumbent	1 year, 326 days	
