= People's Militia =

People's Militia may refer to:

- People's Militia (Burkina Faso)
- People's Militias (Czechoslovakia)
- People's Militia (Ethiopia)
- Russian people's militias in Ukraine, now the 1st Army Corps (DNR) and 2nd Army Corps (LNR) of Russia
- Ukrainian People's Militsiya
- Militia (China)
- Narodnoe Opolcheniye, the people's militia of the Soviet Union
- Peoples' Militia of Bulgaria, now National Police Service (Bulgaria)
- People's Militia of Eritrea, part of Eritrean Defence Forces
- People’s Militia of Libya, part of the Armed Forces of the Libyan Arab Jamahiriya

== See also ==
- Militsiya, police forces in the Soviet Union and eastern Europe
