= Prytanée militaire de Kadiogo =

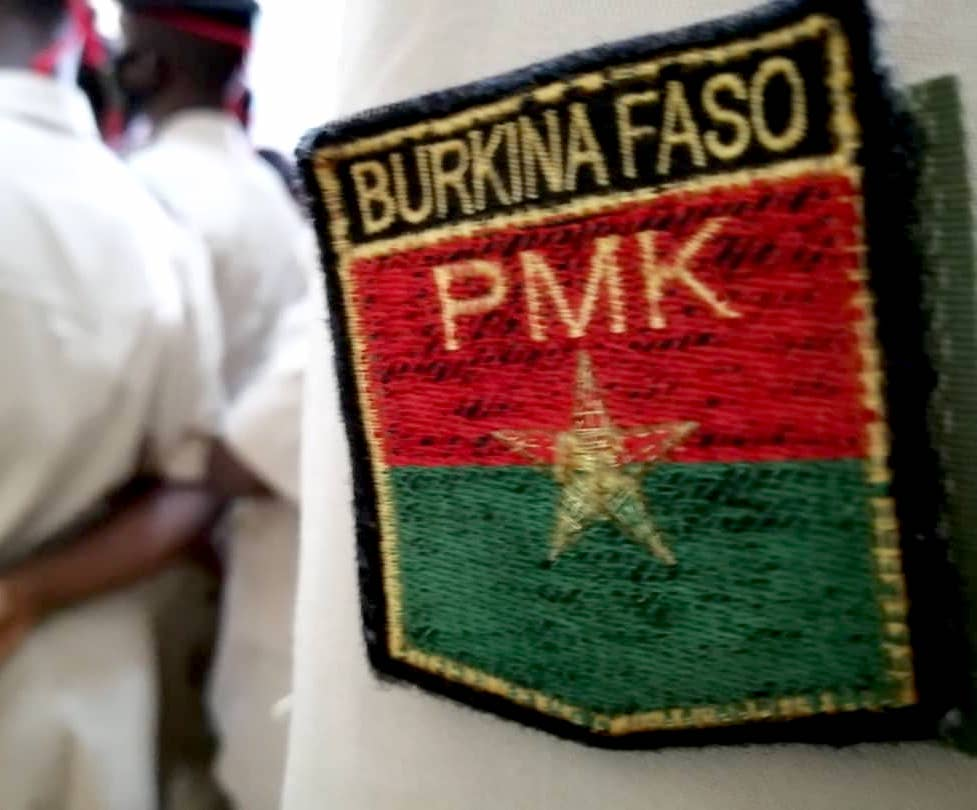
Training insignia of the Kadiogo Military Academy.

The Prytanée militaire de Kadiogo (PMK), also known as Kadiogo Military Academy, is a military secondary school located in Kadiogo Province, Centre Region, Burkina Faso. It is under the authority of the Ministry of Defense and Veterans Affairs. Its primary mission is to provide moral, physical, and intellectual training for military and civilian leaders to serve the nation.

== History ==
It was founded by the French Army in 1951 as the Ouagadougou School for Children of Troops. The school changed its name several times, first becoming the Ouagadougou Military Preparatory School. From 1969, it was known as the Kadiogo Military Academy. In 1985, the school was dissolved, but finally reopened in 1992 under its current name. From its creation until its closure, the school was located in Ouagadougou, on the current site of the Marien-Ngouabi High School. Upon its reopening, the school moved to its current location in Kamboincè, a village about 15 kilometers from Ouagadougou. In April 2001, it was twined with the Malian Armed Forces military school in Kati.

== Admissions ==
At its inception, the school's mission included, among other things, educating the children of military personnel and veterans of the colonial army. In 1963, following independence, this initial purpose was abandoned due to the creation of the national army. The school is now open to all children in the country, without distinction. While it accepts children between ages 11 and 13, pupils are not classified members of the armed forces.

In 2014, a reform was introduced concerning the regionalization of admission quotas. As a result, only the top-performing students in the Certificate of Primary Education) from each region of Burkina Faso are eligible to participate in the entrance exam. Since 2007, admission to the school has also been open to girls.

== Flag ==
The school flag consists of a horizontal bicolour of red and green, with a yellow star in the centre. In the top stripe is written “PRYTANEE MILITAIRE DE KADIOGO” (English: Kadiogo Military Academy) and in the bottom stripe is written “S’INSTRUIRE POUR MIEUX SERVIR” (English: Learn for Better Service). The flag is surrounded by yellow tassels. Attached to the flag is the award of the Order of the Stallion awarded to the school.

== Alumni ==
- Thomas Sankara, 1st president of Burkina Faso
- Kouamé Lougué, Minister of Defence of Burkina Faso from 2000 to 17 January 2004
- Paul-Henri Sandaogo Damiba, interim President of Burkina Faso from 2020 to 2022
