= Yéro Boly =

Burkinabé politician

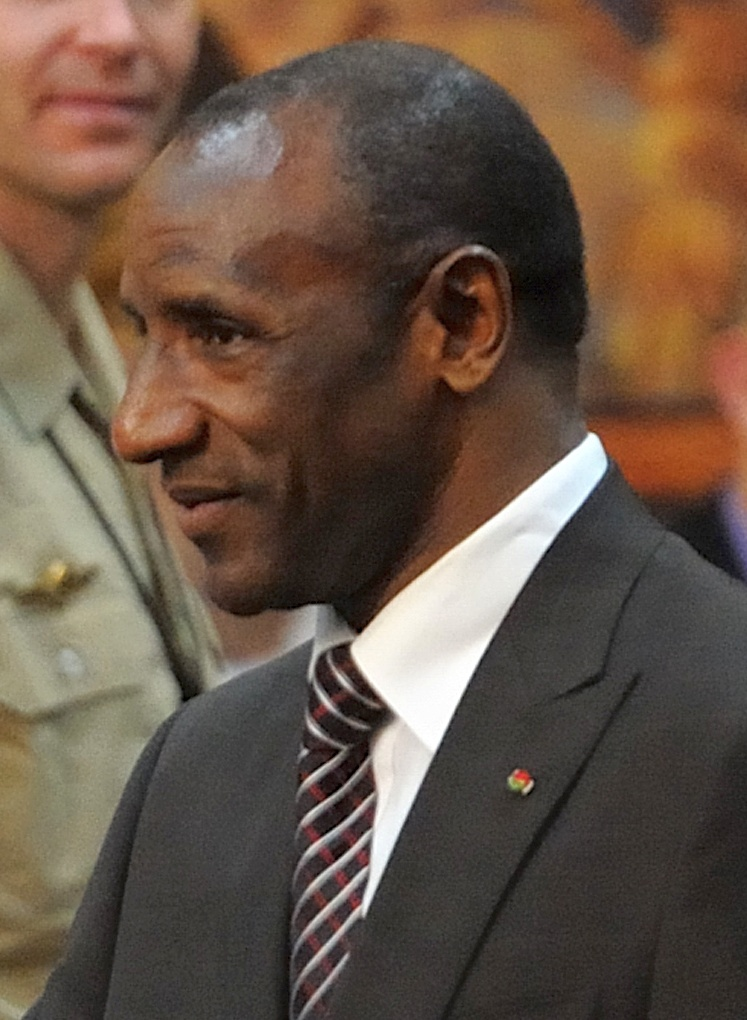

Minister of Defence
- In office 17 January 2004 – 21 April 2011
- President: Blaise Compaoré
- Preceded by: Kouamé Lougué
- Succeeded by: Blaise Compaoré

Personal details
- Born: Yéro Boly; 31 December 1954 (age 71) Komki-Ipala, Kadiogo Province, French Upper Volta
- Profession: Administrator, diplomat, politician

Yéro Boly (born 31 December 1954) is a Burkinabé politician and diplomat. He served as Burkina Faso's Minister of Territorial Administration and Security from 1995 to 2000 and was Director of the Cabinet of the President from 2000 to 2004. Subsequently, he was Minister of Defense from 2004 to 2011 and Ambassador to Morocco from 2012 to 2015.

== Early life ==
Boly was born in Komki-Ipala, located in Kadiogo Province. He attended the National School of Administration and was then a sub-prefect from 1978 to 1980. He again attended the National School of Administration from 1980 to 1983, studying to become a civil administrator.

== Politics ==
After holding administrative roles from 1984 to 1986, he was Ambassador to Côte d'Ivoire from 1986 to 1988, then Ambassador to Libya from 1988 to 1995. Subsequently, he served in the government as Minister of Territorial Administration and Security from 1995 to 2000 and was Director of the Cabinet of the President from 2000 to 2004.

Shortly after the state prosecutor said that General Kouamé Lougué, the Minister of Defense, had been questioned regarding a 2003 coup plot, Lougue was dismissed and Boly, who was described in the media as "a trusted civilian aide" of President Blaise Compaoré, was appointed to succeed him as Minister of Defense on 17 January 2004. In response to alleged violation of Burkinabé airspace by Ivorian military aircraft, Boly warned in July 2004 that the Burkinabé military would "shoot every plane violating our airspace".

Amidst protest and military unrest, Boly was not included in the government named on 21 April 2011; President Compaoré took over the defense portfolio himself. Subsequently, he was appointed as Ambassador to Morocco on 3 August 2011, presenting his credentials to Moroccan King Mohammed VI on 3 February 2012.

In March 2022 Boly, was appointed Minister of State to the President of Burkina Faso, in charge of Social Cohesion and National Reconciliation.

== Awards ==
France awarded Boly the title of Officer of the National Order of Merit (Ordre national du Mérite) on 21 September 2004.
