= Sahel and West Africa Club =

The Sahel and West Africa Club, formerly known as the Sahel Club, was founded after the 1968-1973 Sahel drought that affected food production in the Sahel region. The initial aim of the club concentrated on facilitating cooperation between Sahel States and member nations of OECD to provide solutions to food security and long-term economic growth. The club is aligned with the Organization for Economic Development and Cooperation (OECD).

== History ==
The club originally consisted of countries who were affected by drought in the early 1970s. In 1973 at the height of the Sahel drought, a committee consisting of Senegal, Mali, Chad, Burkina Faso, Mauritania and Niger initiated the Permanent Inter-State Committee for Drought Control in the Sahel (CILSS). In 1976, a new association, the Sahel Club was founded in Dakar and had members of the inter-state committee, Gambia, Cape Verde, multilateral agencies and member nations of OECD. The concept for founding the club was to improve collaboration between the Sahel states and OECD countries and donors. The club's aim include planning for medium term self-sufficiency in agriculture and long term socio-economic regional development.

In 2001, as a result of the inter-dependence between the Sahel states and the ECOWAS community, membership was enlarged and the objectives of the club was turned to sustainable development, agricultural transformation, peace and security, regional integration and food security for vulnerable households. The club is instrumental in applying and supporting ECOWAS policies and operations.
