= Upper Volta =

Upper Volta (now named Burkina Faso) may refer to:

- French Upper Volta (1919–1932, 1947–1958)
  - a territory in French West Africa (1919–1932)
  - a territory of the French Union (1947–1958)
- Republic of Upper Volta (1958–1984)
  - a self-governing republic of the French Community (1958–1960)
  - an independent republic (1960–1984)

== See also ==
- The regions of Ghana called Upper (later split into Upper West and Upper East) and Volta
