= Burkina Faso Armed Forces =

National military of Burkina Faso

- Forces armées du Burkina Faso
- Coat of arms of Burkina Faso
- Founded: 3 August 1960
- Service branches: Burkina Faso Army; Air Force of Burkina Faso; National Gendarmerie; People's Militia
- Headquarters: Ouagadougou
- Website: defense.gov.bf

Leadership
- Commander-in-chief: Captain Ibrahim Traoré
- Minister of Defense and Veteran Affairs: Major General Célestin Simporé
- Chief of General Staff: Brigadier General Moussa Diallo

Personnel
- Active personnel: 12,000 personnel (7,000 Army; 500 Air Force; 4,500 National Gendarmerie) (2022)

Expenditure
- Budget: $2.5 billion (2025)
- Percent of GDP: 2.2% (2019); 2.9% (2022)

Related articles
- History: Agacher Strip War; Sierra Leone Civil War; Insurgency in the Maghreb; 2014 Burkina Faso uprising January 2022 Burkina Faso coup d'état September 2022 Burkina Faso coup d'état Islamist insurgency in Burkina Faso
- Ranks: Military ranks of Burkina Faso

The Burkina Faso Armed Forces (French: Forces armées du Burkina Faso) are the military of Burkina Faso. The service branches of the armed forces include its Army, the Air Force of Burkina Faso, the National Gendarmerie, People's Militia. Being a landlocked country, Burkina Faso has no navy.

== History ==
=== Origins ===
The National Army was created on August 3, 1960 by Law No. 74-60/AN, following Upper Volta's accession to independence. It was formed on the basis of the former French colonial army and comprised officers, non-commissioned officers, and enlisted personnel.

At its inception, it was structured around the 1st Upper Volta Battalion, composed of five infantry companies: two stationed in Bobo-Dioulasso and three in Ouagadougou. The official transfer of command between the French and Voltaic military authorities took place on November 1, 1961. Since then, November 1 has been celebrated annually as the anniversary of the National Armed Forces. The Air Force was integrated into the National Army on November 25, 1965, five years after the creation of the National Army. In 1968, a 2nd Upper Volta battalion was created in Bobo-Dioulasso. Following the border conflict with Mali in 1974, several military garrisons were established.

In 1966, a military coup deposed the first president of Upper Volta, Maurice Yaméogo, and suspended the constitution. The National Assembly was dissolved, and Lieutenant Colonel Sangoulé Lamizana was installed at the head of a government of senior army officers. The army junta remained in power for four years; on 14 June 1970, the Voltans ratified a new constitution that established a four-year transition period toward complete civilian rule. Lamizana remained in power throughout the 1970s as president of military or mixed civil-military governments.

=== 1980s ===
Lamizana's government faced problems with the country's traditionally powerful trade unions and on November 25, 1980, Colonel Saye Zerbo overthrew President Lamizana in a bloodless coup. Colonel Zerbo established the Military Committee of Recovery for National Progress as the supreme governmental authority, thus eradicating the 1977 constitution.

Colonel Zerbo also encountered resistance from trade unions and was overthrown two years later on November 7, 1982, by Major Dr. Jean-Baptiste Ouédraogo and the Council of Popular Salvation (CSP). The CSP continued to ban political parties and organisations, yet promised a transition to civilian rule and a new constitution.

Factional infighting developed between moderates in the CSP and radicals led by Captain Thomas Sankara, who was appointed prime minister in January 1983. The internal political struggle and Sankara's leftist rhetoric led to his arrest and subsequent efforts to bring about his release, directed by Captain Blaise Compaoré. This release effort resulted in yet another military coup d'état on August 4, 1983. Compaoré came to power in a 1987 coup that led to the death of Sankara.

A major restructuring took place in 1985 with the implementation of:

- six (6) military regions (MR)
- six (6) gendarmerie groups (GG) (in Dori, Ouahigouya, Dédougou, Bobo-Dioulasso, Ouagadougou and Fada)
- two (2) air regions (Ouagadougou and Bobo-Dioulasso).

=== Post-Sankara ===
In 1994, a new administrative and territorial reorganization led to the reduction and restructuring of the military apparatus. Three (3) military regions (RM) and three (3) gendarmerie regions (RG) were then established:

- Kaya for the 1st RM and RG;
- Bobo-Dioulasso for the 2nd RM and RG
- Ouagadougou for the 3rd RM and RG

On February 15, 2011, soldiers mutinied in Ouagadougou over unpaid housing allowances. On April 18, 2011, it was reported that the mutiny had spread to Kaya after demonstrations in Pô and Tenkodogo. On April 29, 2011, the army said the mutiny would end after Compaoré promised to improve the military's housing, clothing and food allowances, though there were later protests by soldiers.

After a coup by members of the Regiment of Presidential Security on September 16, 2015, army units marched on Ouagadougou to oppose the coup, resulting in the restoration of Burkina Faso's transitional government (which was appointed after the 2014 Burkinabe uprising) on September 23, 2015.

=== 2020-present ===
In a coup attempt on January 24, 2022, mutinying soldiers arrested President Roch Kabore following gunfire.

On April 20, 2023, the 3rd Battalion of the Rapid Intervention Brigade committed the Karma massacre, rounding up and executing between 60 and 156 civilians, including women and children.

== Structure ==
=== Army ===
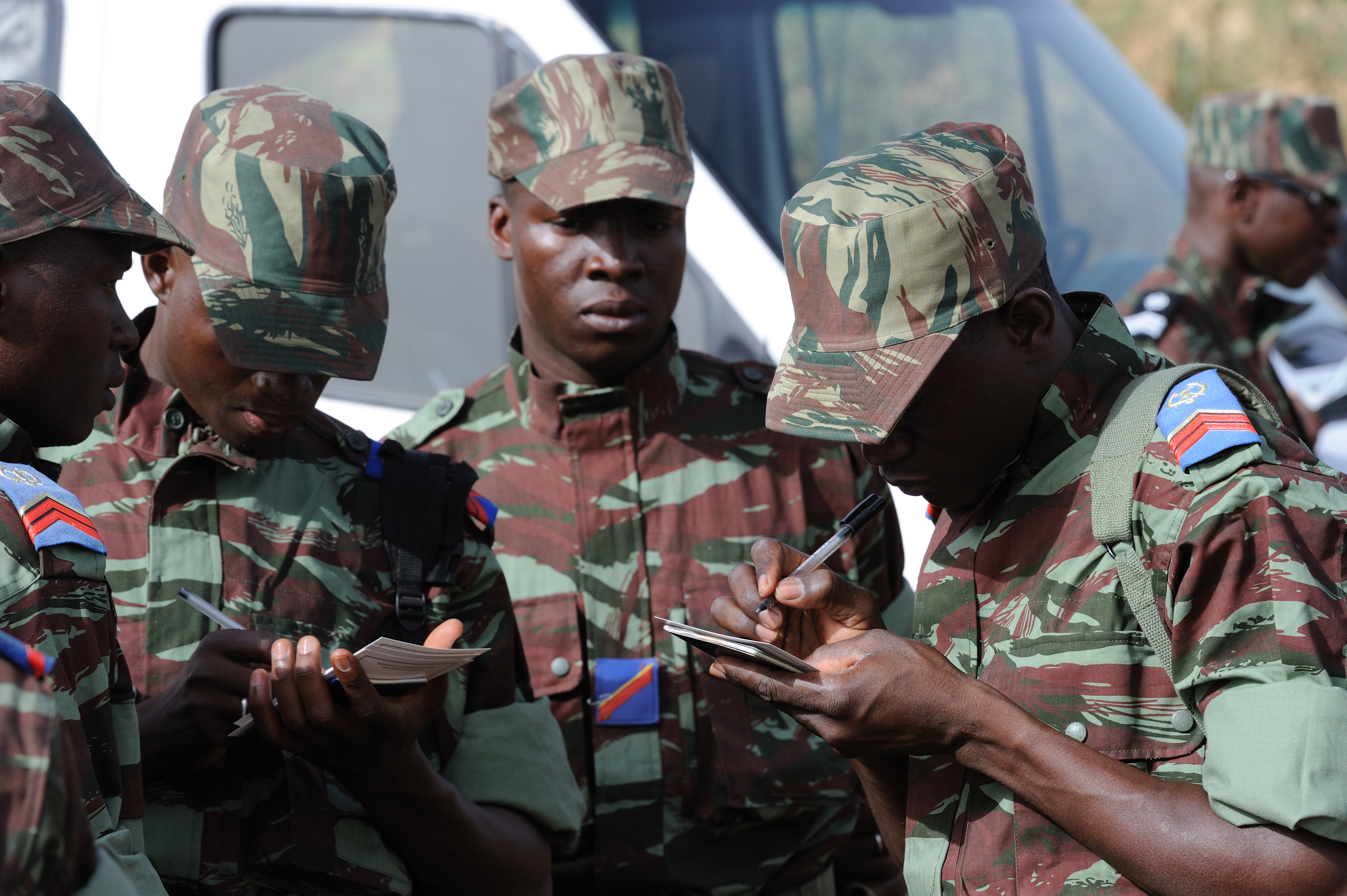
Soldiers from Burkina Faso before deployment to an exercise in Mali (2010)

The Army of Burkina Faso (French: Armée de terre burkinabè or LAT – Ground Forces) is a skeletonised force structure of some 5,800–6,000 officers and men, augmented by a conscript force or People's Militia of some 45,000 men and women. Unlike the police and security forces, the Army and the People's Militia are organised along Soviet/Chinese models and precepts. The Army is equipped with light wheeled armoured cars, some mounting cannons.

The International Institute for Strategic Studies estimated in 2011–12 that Burkina Faso had 6,400 personnel in L'Armée de Terre in three military regions, one tank battalion (two tank platoons), five infantry regiments that may be under-strength, and an airborne regiment. Artillery and engineer battalions are also listed.

In recent years, the United States has begun providing military assistance and training to Burkina Faso's ground forces. It has trained three 750-man battalions for peace support operations in Darfur. During a recent UN inspection, a U.S. Department of Defense evaluation team found Burkina's Laafi battalion fit to deploy to Sudan. Using a small Department of Defense International Military Education and Training (IMET) budget, the U.S. Embassy has established English-language courses at an LAT military base, and has brought LAT officers to attend officer basic training courses in the U.S. The government of Burkina Faso has also accepted additional U.S. training assistance in counter-terrorism tactics and humanitarian assistance. Burkina Faso has recently become a member of the Trans-Sahara Counterterrorism Partnership (TSCTP).

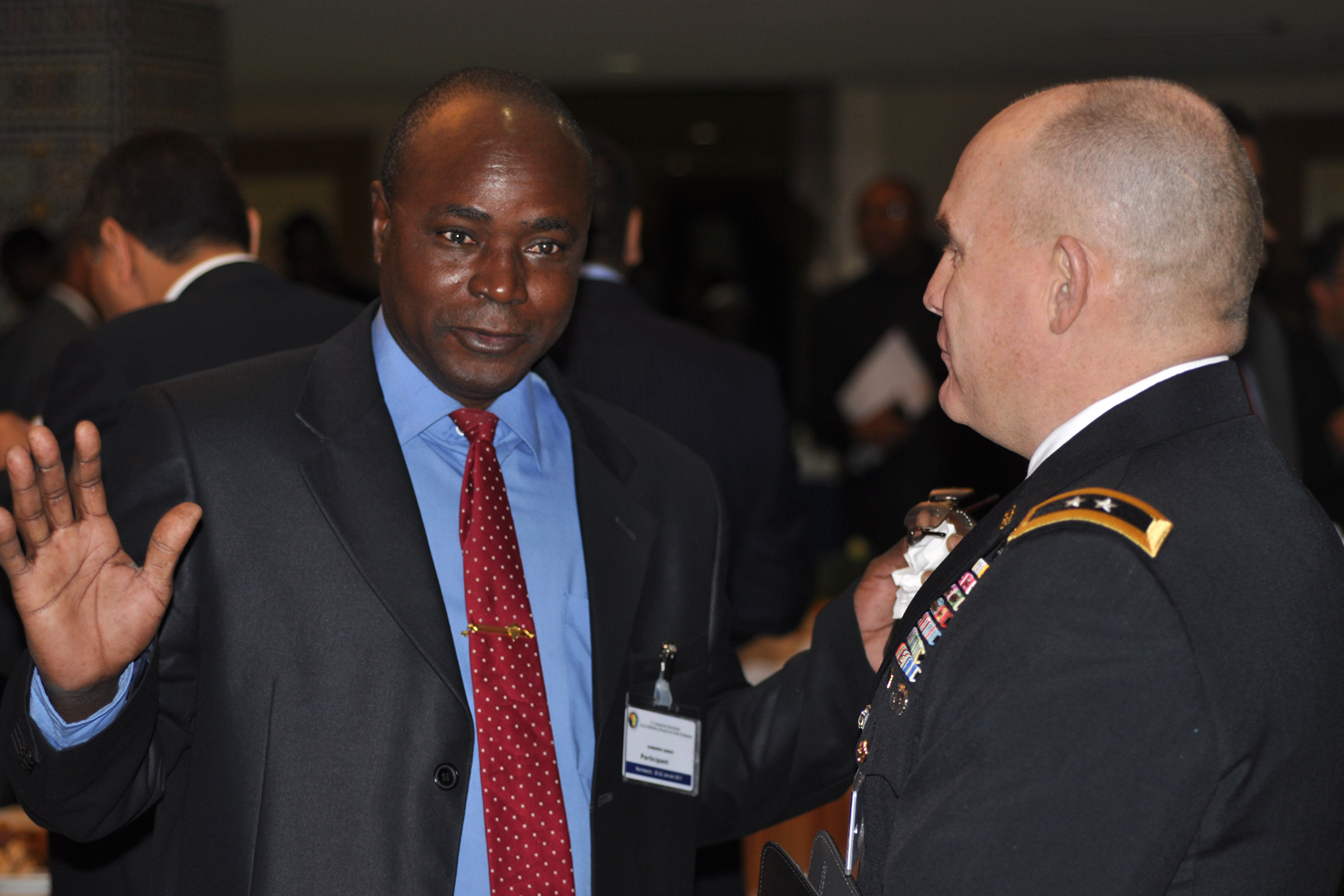
Colonel Oumarou Sadou and David R. Hogg

Three years of increasingly frequent and deadly attacks, by various jihadist groups, prompted the replacement of the Army Chief of Staff, Sadou Oumarou, appointed three years ago with the same mandate, with General Moise Minoungou on 6 January 2019.

There is a multi-national training camp in Loumbila Department, staffed by Czech and Polish instructors.

==== Military Regions ====
	Units	Notes
1st Military Region	10th Command, Support and Supply Regiment based in Kaya; 11th Commando Infantry Regiment based in Dori; 12th Commando Infantry Regiment based in Ouahigouya; Artillery Regiment (RA) stationed at Kaya	
2nd Military Region	20th Command, Support and Supply Regiment based in Bobo Dioulasso; 22nd Commando Infantry Regiment based in Gaoua; 23rd Commando Infantry Regiment in Dédougou; 24th Combined Regiment stationed in Bobo Dioulasso; 25th Parachute Commando Regiment based in Dioulasso	
3rd Military Region	30th Command and Support Regiment based at Camp Baba Sy in Ouagadougou; 31st Commando Infantry Regiment based in Tenkodogo; 34th Combined Arms Regiment stationed in Fada N'gourma	

=== Central Army Group ===
Elements of the Central Army Group (GCA) are stationed at the Guillaume Ouedraogo and Sangoulé Lamizana military camps in Ouagadougou. However, detachments are also present in other military regions. The following units comprise the GCA:

- Supply Battalion
- Materiel and Transport Battalion
- Strategic Signals Battalion of the Armies
- Military Engineer Battalion
- Health Battalion
- Command and Support Battalion

=== Air Force ===
The roundel used by the Air Force

The Air Force was founded in 1964 as the Escadrille de la République de Haute-Volta (EHV) or the Republic of Upper Volta Air Squadron, a subordinate unit of the Army. That year, a transient air support base was created with the assistance of the French Air Force. After acquiring an initial fleet of utility and transport aircraft, the squadron was attached to an inter-army support regiment. In 1970, the Escadrille was renamed the Force Aérienne de Haute-Volta, or FAHV, and in 1977 became an autonomous force. In October 1985, the Force Aérienne du Burkina Faso, or FABF, was officially inaugurated.

The EHV was initially formed with two Douglas C-47 Skytrain and three MH.1521M Broussard aircraft. These were later followed by two Alouette III SA.316 B helicopters, used mostly for liaison purposes, one twin-engined Aero Commander 500 light utility aircraft, two Hawker-Siddeley HS.748-2A twin turboprop transport aircraft, and two Nord 262 twin turboprop transport aircraft. Two escadrilles (squadrons) or sub-formations were created: the Escadrille de Transport (Transport Unit), and the Escadrille d'Hélicoptères (Helicopter Unit). Later, the Escadrille d'Entraînement (Training Unit) was added. All squadrons were initially based at Ouagadougou.

In mid-1984, Libyan military aid brought eight Mikoyan-Gurevich MiG-21 jet fighters, along with two MiG-21U combat trainer versions. These ex-Libyan Air Force MiG-21 "Fishbed" fighters were based in Ouagadougou, although they were actually operated by the Libyan Air Force on loan by Libya, and were removed in 1985 without seeing combat. A single MiG-17F Fresco that was also operated by the FABF did see combat service in the Agacher Strip War in 1985–86. Burkina Faso operated a number of MiG-17s through the 1990s, with some (like 8401) later noted abandoned by 2001 at Ouagadougou. In 1985, the FABF also acquired two ex-Soviet Mi-4 transport helicopters from an unknown supplier, followed by an additional two Mi-4s. The Mi-4s were operated by the FABF until the late 1980s, when they were taken out of service. Five Mi-8/17 transport helicopters were later added to the Escadrille d'Hélicoptères. While supervising the ceasefire after the Agacher Strip War, an FABF SA.316B Alouette III crashed at Kouni on 14 January 1986, leaving only one SA.316B still in service with the Escadrille d'Hélicoptères.

In 1986, the FABF formed a new unit, the Escadrille de Chasse (EdC) (Attack Unit). In mid-1986 six ex-Philippine Air Force SF.260WP Warrior armed trainers/light strike aircraft were acquired from a dealer in Belgium, which offered the FABF a much simpler and less expensive alternative in tactical air support to the expensive MiGs. The Warriors were not only used for pilot training, but also as light strike aircraft, and a number of them were employed by the FABF's Escadrille de Chasse (EdC). Four additional SF.260WPs were subsequently bought directly from Italy. The six ex-Philippine SF.260WP aircraft were taken out of service in 1993 and returned to their previous owner, although the four newly built SF.260WP aircraft were retained in service, and stationed at Bobo Dioulasso air base.

Most of the other light aircraft acquired by the FABF in the 1970s and 1980s have also now been retired along with the Mi-4 helicopters, but some recent acquisitions have been made, including a Beechcraft King Air, a Piper PA-34 Seneca, a CEAPR Robin light training aircraft, and a single Air Tractor AT-802 aerial sprayer aircraft for spraying insecticides, purchased after the northern part of the country suffered heavy crop damage from a 2004 invasion of swarming locusts. In 2009, two Xenon Gyroplane autogyros were purchased for use by police and security forces.

In late 2005, the FABF acquired two Mil Mi-35 "Hind" attack helicopters from Russia in an apparent response to moves by neighbouring Ivory Coast to bolster its own air attack capabilities during the Ivorian Civil War.

==== Aircraft ====
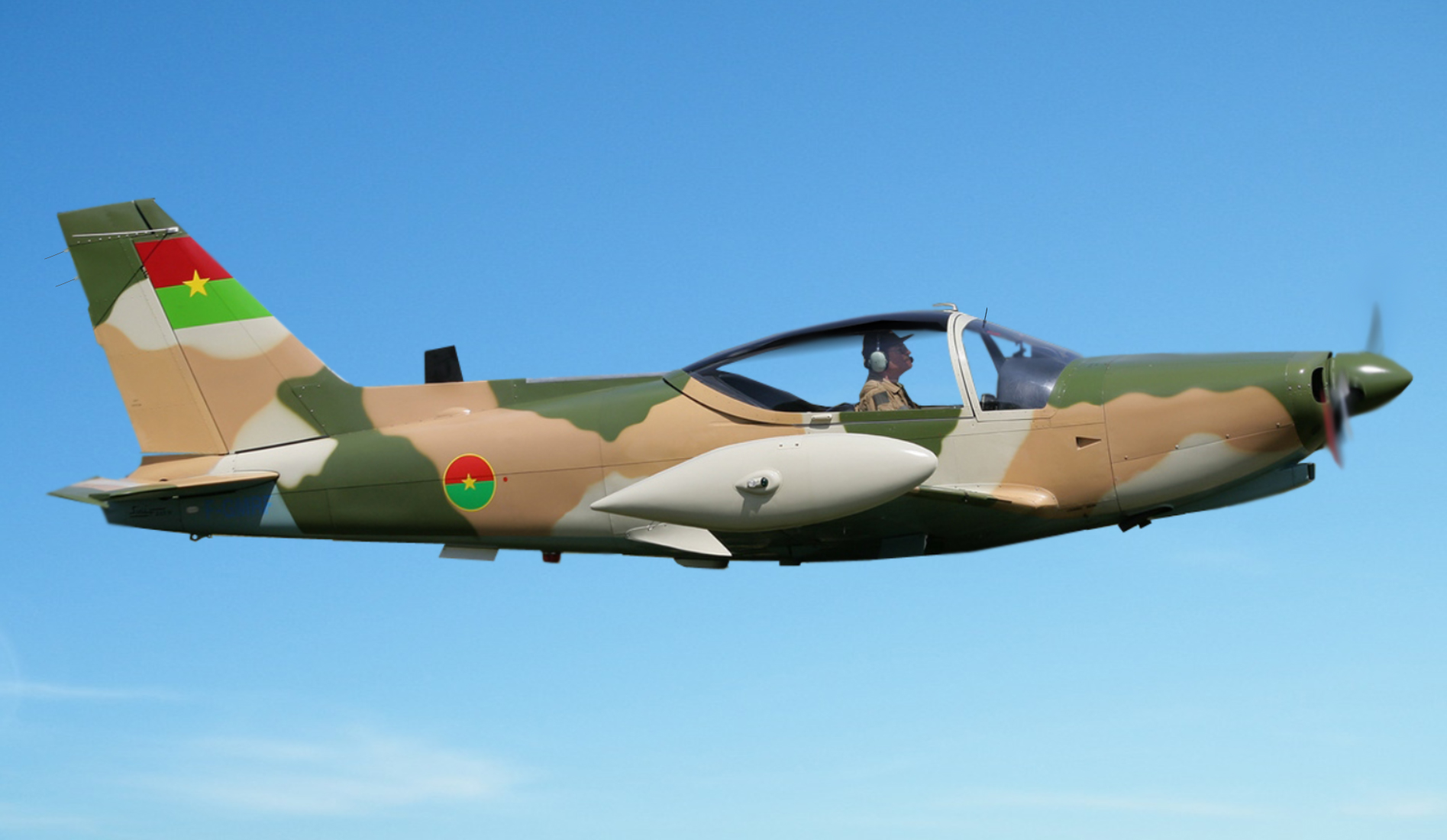
An SF 260C in France, painted in the Burkina Faso Air Force livery

Aircraft	Origin	Type	Variant	In service	Notes
Combat aircraft
Embraer EMB-314	Brazil	Light attack		3	
Reconnaissance
Diamond DA42	Austria	Surveillance		1	
Diamond DA62	Austria	Surveillance		1	
Transport
Super King Air	United States	Transport	200	1	
EADS CASA C-295	Spain	Transport		1	
Helicopter
Mil Mi-17	Russia	Utility	Mi-8/171	3	2 on order
Mil Mi-24	Russia	Attack	Mi-35	5	
Mil Mi-26	Russia	Utility		1	
Bell UH-1	United States	Utility	UH-1H	1	Donated by the Government of Taiwan
Eurocopter AS350	France	Utility		8	
Trainer aircraft
Humbert Tétras	France	Trainer		8	Also provides surveillance
Unmanned aerial vehicle
Bayraktar TB2	Turkey	UCAV		5	
Bayraktar Akıncı	Turkey	UCAV		2	

=== National Fire Brigade ===
The National Fire Brigade is a component of the National Armed Forces placed at the disposal of the ministry responsible for territorial administration for use in the context of civil security. The National Fire Brigade reports to the General Staff for all military matters. The commander of the National Fire Brigade has the rank of Chief of Staff of the Army. It comprises six companies:

- 1st Company (Ouagadougou)
- 2nd Company (Bobo Dioulasso)
- 3rd Company (Koudougou)
- 4th Company (Ouahigouya)
- 5th Company (Banfora)
- 6th Company (Boromo)

== Personnel ==
=== Education ===
- Tiefo Amoro Institute of Higher Military Education (IEMS-TA)
  - War College
  - Staff College
- Georges Namoano Military Academy
- Prytanée militaire de Kadiogo

== Sources ==
- World aircraft information files, Brightstar publishing London File 338 sheet 4
