= National Gendarmerie (Burkina Faso) =

Gendarmerie force of Burkina Faso

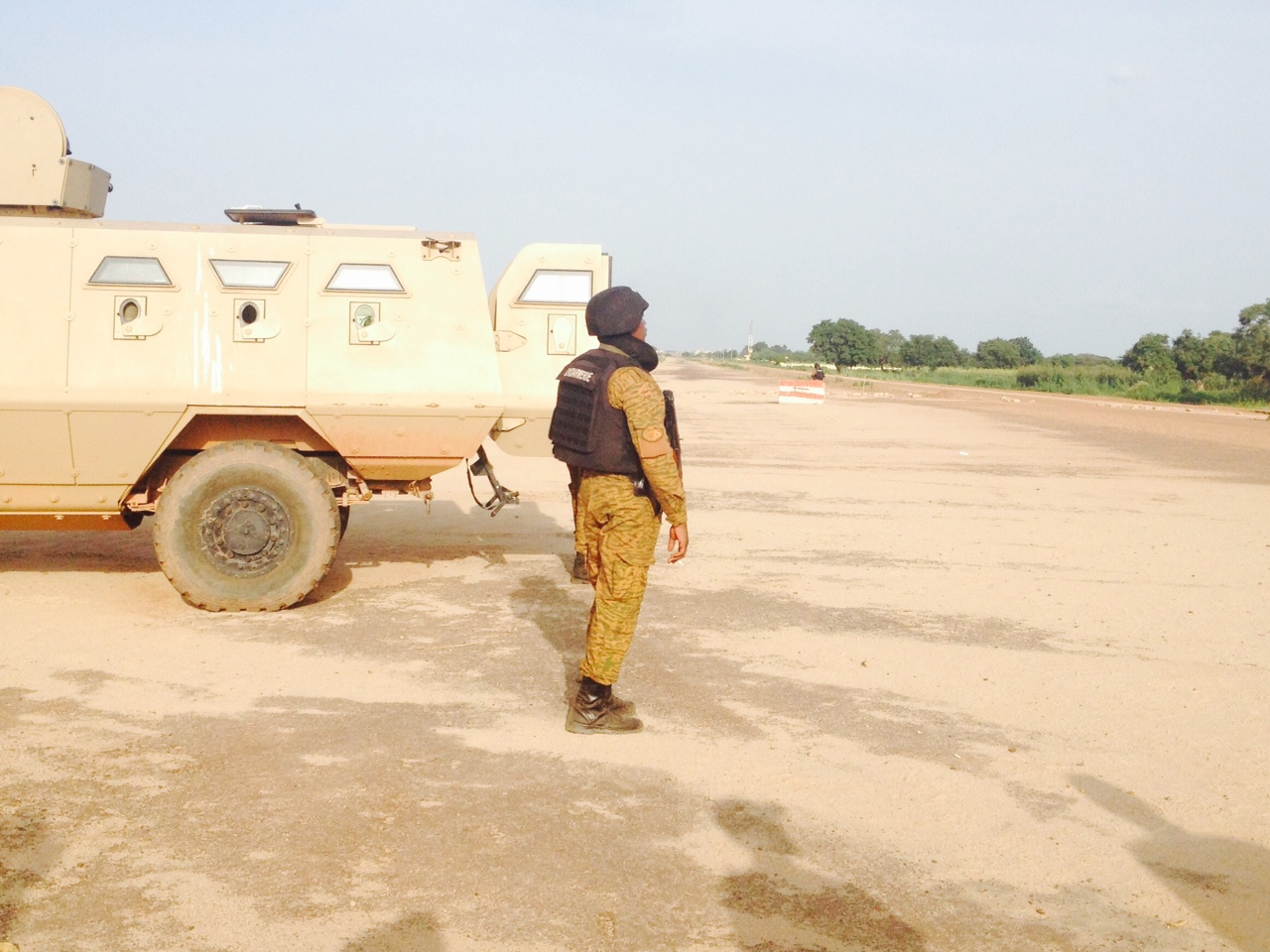
A gendarme in front of an ACMAT Bastion in front of the presidential palace in Ouagadougou at the end of the 2015 Burkinabé coup d'état attempt.

The National Gendarmerie (Gendarmerie Nationale) is the national gendarmerie force of Burkina Faso. It is one of the two national police forces, alongside the civilian National Police force.

The service is a branch of the Burkina Faso military acting under the authority of the Minister of Defence.

== Ranks ==
Rank group	General / flag officers				Senior officers				Junior officers
(Burkina Faso) Burkinabè National Gendarmerie
(Burkina Faso) Burkinabè National Gendarmerie	Général d'armée	Général de corps d'armée	Général de division	Général de brigade	Colonel-major	Colonel	Lieutenant-colonel	Commandant	Capitaine	Lieutenant	Sous-lieutenant

Rank group	Senior NCOs					Junior NCOs	Enlisted
(Burkina Faso) Burkinabè National Gendarmerie
(Burkina Faso) Burkinabè National Gendarmerie	Adjudant major	Adjudant-chef	Adjudant	Maréchal-des-logis-chef	Maréchal-des-logis		Gendarme

== See also ==
- Law enforcement in Burkina Faso
