= Kouamé Lougué =

Burkinabé politician

General Kouamé Lougué

Minister of Defence
- In office 2000 – 17 January 2004
- President: Blaise Compaoré
- Succeeded by: Yéro Boly

Personal details
- Profession: Soldier, politician

General Kouamé Lougué is a Burkinabé politician and former soldier who served as Defence Minister from 2000 to 2004 under President Blaise Compaoré. Lougué had been appointed in 2000 after having helped suppress an attempted coup in 1999. In 2003, another coup plot resulted in Compaoré firing Lougué as defence minister, replacing him with Yéro Boly on 17 January 2004.

Lougué took part in the 2014 Burkinabé uprising. He is seen as a potential candidate in the 2015 presidential election.
