= People's Militia (Burkina Faso) =

The People's Militia (French: Milice du Peuple) is a branch of the armed forces of Burkina Faso. It is a paramilitary militia, a part-time force of conscripted men and women between the age of 20 and 35, trained in both military and civil tasks and serving two years each. It numbers about 45,000 fighters, about 2.25% of the total population in the 20–35 age group.

The militia was formed by Captain Thomas Sankara, a radical left-wing revolutionary who came to power in the 1983 military coup, possibly with inspiration from the People's Militia of Muammar Gaddafi's Libya and the Militia of Mao Zedong's China. The concept was to make the people itself the line of defence, rather than a professional army. The People's Militia was possibly connected to the Committees for the Defense of the Revolution.

== See also ==
- History of Burkina Faso
- Regiment of Presidential Security
