= Emmanuel Zoungrana =

Military officer of Burkina Faso

Emmanuel Zoungrana is a former military officer of Burkina Faso.

He graduated from Prytanée militaire du Kadiogo (PMK), which trains officers of the Burkinabe army. He was the commander of the 12th infantry commando regiment.

== Education ==
He enrolled at the Kadiogo military school in 1993. In 2000, he obtained a baccalaureate with a philosophy option, then joined the Togo Cadet Officers School, from which he graduated as a lieutenant in 2003. He then turned to commando training. He took courses in several countries like Morocco and France. At the end of his training, he ended up leading the 25th parachute commando regiment.

== Arrest ==
Arrested by the National Gendarmerie on January 10, 2022, he was suspected of preparing a coup d'Etat against former President Roch Marc Christian Kaboré. In the beginning of February 2022, the military court of Ouagadougou annulled the decision to detain Zoungrana.

On January 11, 2022. the Military Prosecutor's Office informed that eight soldiers were also arrested in connection with a project to "destabilize the institutions". This wave of arrests of military officers occurred in a context of popular discontent, insecurity crisis, and fears from the government that the army would prepare a power grab.

== Trial ==
The trial of Lieutenant-Colonel Emmanuel Zoungrana opened on September 22, 2022 on the request for provisional release submitted by the prisoner's counsel. It has been postponed to 27 October 2022 for deliberation.

He is prosecuted for five charges including undermining state security and money laundering. Lieutenant-Colonel Zoungrana was provisionally released for the undermining of state security charges but not for the money laundering charges.

His lawyers brought the matter before the highest court in the country to rule on the request for provisional release not granted to their Zoungrana by the military justice system.
