= Law enforcement in Burkina Faso =

Like many other countries with a French colonial heritage, law enforcement in Burkina Faso is a responsibility primarily shared by the gendarmerie and the police.

Burkina Faso, like France and several other countries, draws a separation between administrative policing and judicial policing. The former deals with the general maintenance of law and order. The latter relates to criminal investigations.

Following the introduction of the 2003 law on public security, Burkina Faso has since 2005 adopted a community policing approach. This applies to police and the gendarmerie.

Russia provides significant training assistance.

== Police ==
=== National Police ===
The National Police, or Police nationale du Burkina Faso, is responsible for the maintaining public peace, supporting the security of the State and institutions, protecting people and property, collecting information on behalf of the government, and maintaining links with foreign law enforcement bodies. The national police is accountable to the Minister of administration, decentralization and security.

The national police has both administrative and judicial police powers. Unlike Commonwealth countries or the USA, individual officers may not all hold judicial powers. They thus may only be empowered to temporarily detain suspects, but not formally arrest them.

=== Municipal Police ===
The municipal police, or Police municipale, are forces which answer directly to the mayor of a town. They generally enforce law and order (police administrative) but do not have investigative powers (police judiciaire).

The municipal police is a recent addition to the security forces. A municipal police had first been created in 1977, but was abolished 1 January 1984 in the early days of the Thomas Sankara revolution. The existence of the new municipal police stems from the administrative decentralization laws of 3 and 6 August 1998. Each of the 345 communes in Burkina Faso may choose to organize a municipal police. As of 2009, 22 communes employing a total of complement of 760 agents had done so.

While they are not accountable to the same organisations, the municipal police entertains close links with the national police, mainly as the national police provides all training and administrative and managerial support, and that they often are called to operate in proximity to each other. The municipal police works infrequently with the Gendarmerie and other security forces.

== Gendarmerie ==
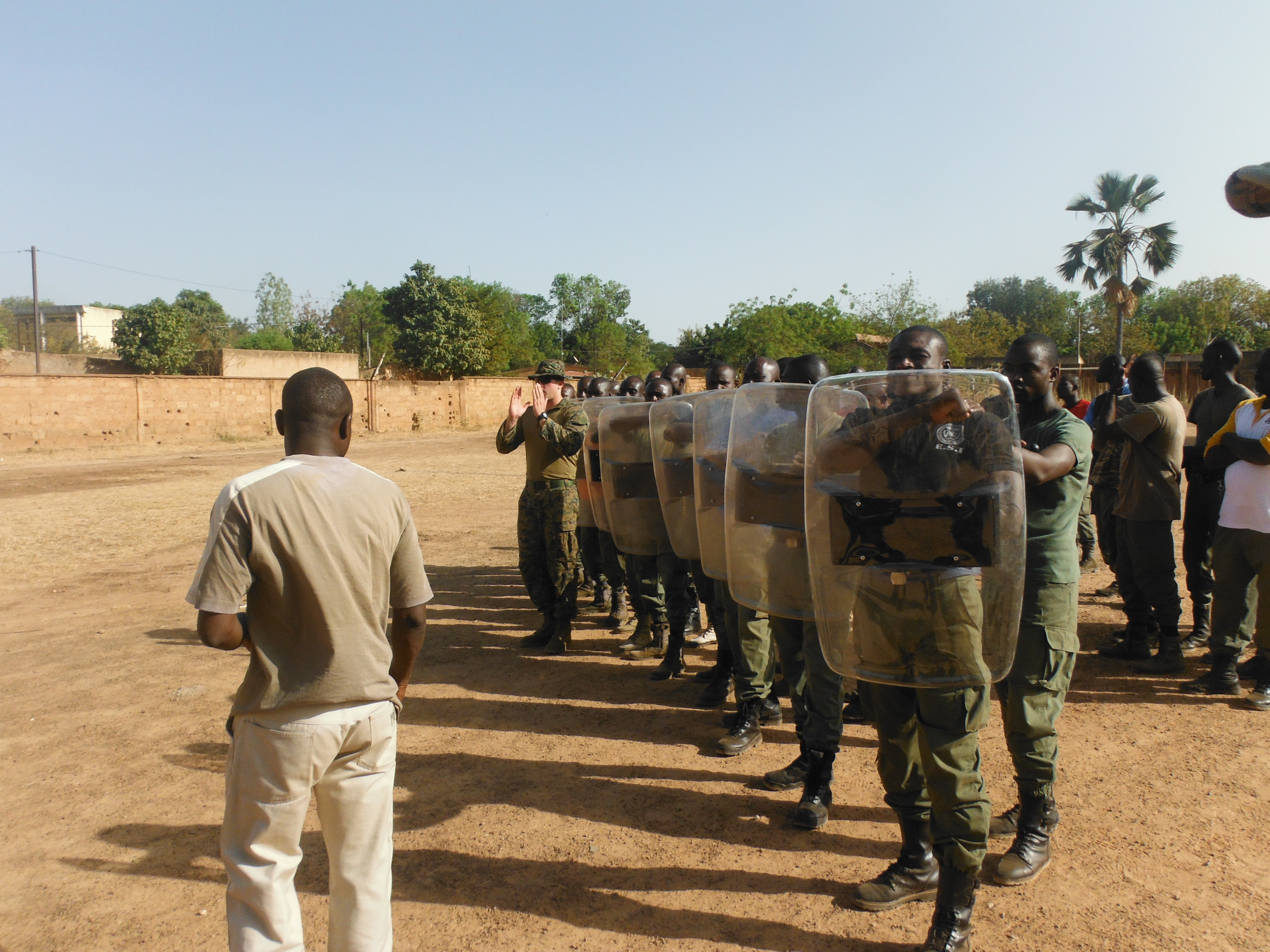
The Gendarmerie as a paramilitary force: Burkinabe Gendarmes undergoing crowd-control training delivered by US Marines in 2013.

The Gendarmerie Nationale has a dual purpose. It acts as both a military force and a police force. It answers to the Minister of Defense. The gendarmerie is primarily stationed in rural and border areas. As a police force, it performs judicial and administrative policing, similarly to the national police.

== Other forces ==
=== Presidential Guards ===
Established in 1995 by President Blaise Compaoré, the Régiment de la sécurité présidentielle provides security to the president. Because the unit answers directly to the president's Chief of Staff, it is unaccountable to the minister of defense.

=== Prison guards ===
Prison guards answer to the Minister of Justice. They detain both civilian and military prisoners.

=== Customs ===
The Customs service falls under the authority of the Minister of Finance.

== Sources ==
1. World Police Encyclopedia, ed. by Dilip K. Das & Michael Palmiotto published by Taylor & Francis. 2004, p. 137-141 .
2. World Encyclopedia of Police Forces and Correctional Systems, second edition, 2006 by Gale.
3. Sullivan, Larry E. Encyclopedia of Law Enforcement. Thousand Oaks: Sage Publications, 2005.
