= Ministry of War and Patriotic Defense of Burkina Faso =

The Ministry of War and Patriotic Defense of Burkina Faso (French: Ministère de la Guerre et de la Défense Patriotique) is the government agency responsible for overseeing the national defense and security of the Burkina Faso.

It is one of the key ministries in the Burkinabé government and plays a crucial role in the management of the Burkina Faso Armed Forces.

== History ==
It was founded on May 1, 1959 as the Ministry of Defence of the Republic of Upper Volta with Maurice Yaméogo as its first minister. The National Army was created on August 3, 1960 by Law No. 74-60/AN, following Upper Volta's accession to independence. It was formed on the basis of the former French colonial army and comprised officers, non-commissioned officers, and enlisted personnel. The official transfer of command between the French and Voltaic military authorities took place on November 1, 1961. In 2014, it was renamed to the Ministry of Defense and Veterans Affairs of Burkina Faso (French: Ministère de la Défense nationale et des Anciens combattants). In January 2026, as part of the Progressive and Popular Revolution started by Burkinabe President Ibrahim Traoré, the leader of the Patriotic Movement for Safeguard and Restoration, the ministry was renamed to the Ministry of War and Patriotic Defense.

== Structure ==
=== Cabinet Composition ===
The Minister's Office includes:

- Chief of Staff;
- Private Secretariat;
- Technical Advisors;
- Mission Officers Unit;
- Protocol;
- Security.

=== Organization ===
- General Inspectorate of the National Armed Forces;
- national gendarmerie;
- Military Justice;
  - Army Detention and Correctional Facility (MACA)
- National Fire Brigade;
- Strategic Analysis Directorate;
- Military Administration;
- Veterans Office
- Structures under supervision:
  - International Military Sports Council (CISM);
  - Western Liaison Office (WLO);
  - Ministerial Committee for the Fight against AIDS and STIs (CMLS).

== List of ministers ==
The minister is the political head of the ministry. They are appointed by the president of Burkina Faso and are responsible for providing strategic direction and leadership to the ministry. The minister oversees the implementation of defense policies, represents the ministry at national and international forums, and acts as the primary point of contact for matters related to defense.

- Maurice Yaméogo (1 May 1959 – 1 May 1961)
- Georges Bamina Nébié (2 May 1961 – 10 May 1962)
- Michel Tougouma (11 May 1962 – 7 December 1965)
- Maurice Yaméogo (8 December 1965 – 7 January 1966)
- Lamizana Aboubacar Sangoulé (8 January 1966 – 5 April 1967)
- Arzouma Ouédraogo (6 April 1967 – 21 February 1971)
- Daouda Traoré (22 February 1971 – 9 February 1974)
- Baba Sy (10 February 1974 – 16 July 1978)
- François Bouda (16 July 1978 – 6 December 1980)
- Saye Zerbo (7 December 1980 – 26 November 1982)
- Jean-Baptiste Ouedraogo (26 November 1982 – 23 August 1983)
- Jean-Baptiste Boukary Lingani (23 August 1983 - 18 September 1989)
- Blaise Compaoré (21 September 1989 – 25 July 1991)
- Lassané Ouangrawa (26 July 1991 – 18 June 1992)
- Yarga Larba (19 June 1992 – 21 March 1994)
- Kanidoua Naboho (22 March 1994 – 11 June 1995)
- Badaye Fayama (11 June 1995 – 9 June 1997)
- Albert Millogo (10 June 1997 – 12 November 2000)
- Kouamé Lougué (12 November 2000 – 17 January 2004)
- Yéro Boly (17 January 2004 – 21 April 2011)
- Blaise Compaoré (21 April 2011 - November 23, 2014)
- Yacouba Isaac Zida (November 23, 2014 – July 16, 2015)
- Michel Kafando (July 16, 2015 – January 13, 2016)
- Roch Marc Christian Kaboré (January 13, 2016 – February 20, 2017)
- Jean-Claude Bouda (February 20, 2017 - January 24, 2019)
- Moumina Chérif Sy (January 24, 2019 – June 30, 2021)
- Roch Marc Christian Kaboré (30 June – 10 December 2021)
- Aimé Barthélémy Simporé (10 December 2021 – 12 September 2022)
- Paul-Henri Sandaogo Damiba (September 12, 2022 – September 30, 2022)
- Kassoum Coulibaly (November 3, 2022 – December 8, 2024)
- Célestin Simporé (December 8, 2024 - Present)

== See also ==
- Government of Burkina Faso
- Burkina Faso Armed Forces
