= Maréchal des logis =

French military rank

Marshal of lodgings Maréchal des logis
- Shoulder insignia of Maréchal and Maréchal...-chef

- Camouflage insignia of Maréchal and Maréchal...-chef
- Country: France
- Service branch: French Army; National Gendarmerie
- Abbreviation: MDL; MDC (chef)
- Rank group: Sub-officer
- NATO rank code: OR-5; OR-6 (chef)
- Next higher rank: Adjutant
- Next lower rank: Caporal-chef de première classe
- Equivalent ranks: Second-Maître; Maître (chef)

Maréchal des logis (French; lit. 'lodgings marshal') is a sub-officer rank used by some units of the French Armed Forces. It is traditionally a cavalry unit rank. There are three distinct ranks of maréchal des logis, which are generally the equivalents of sergeant ranks (although they generally have less responsibility than a British or Commonwealth sergeant).

- Maréchal des logis-chef (equivalent to sergent-chef). This is a superior rank to maréchal des logis and wears three chevrons, gold or silver. (Note: The colour of the chevrons of the maréchal des logis depends on his unit; the vast majority of armoured cavalry units use silver, but a few of them, like the spahis, use gold.)
- Maréchal des logis de carrière (equivalent to sergent). Wears two chevrons. A maréchal des logis may be shortened to "margis" in military jargon.
- Maréchal des logis sous contrat (equivalent to sergent sous contrat). Wears one chevron. This rank is increasingly uncommon in the French military since the end of conscription.

The maréchal des logis usually commands a section, tank, or gun, and therefore corresponds approximately to the British or Commonwealth rank of corporal, the U.S. Army rank of staff sergeant, or the U.S. Marine Corps rank of sergeant.

The rank of maréchal des logis is used by the armoured cavalry, the artillery, the materiel, the commissary and the transport corps, all of the French Army, and by the Gendarmerie Nationale.

The term logistics is derived from maréchal des logis, by Antoine-Henri Jomini. (Note: For details, see Logistics § Origin.)
