= Célestin Simpore =

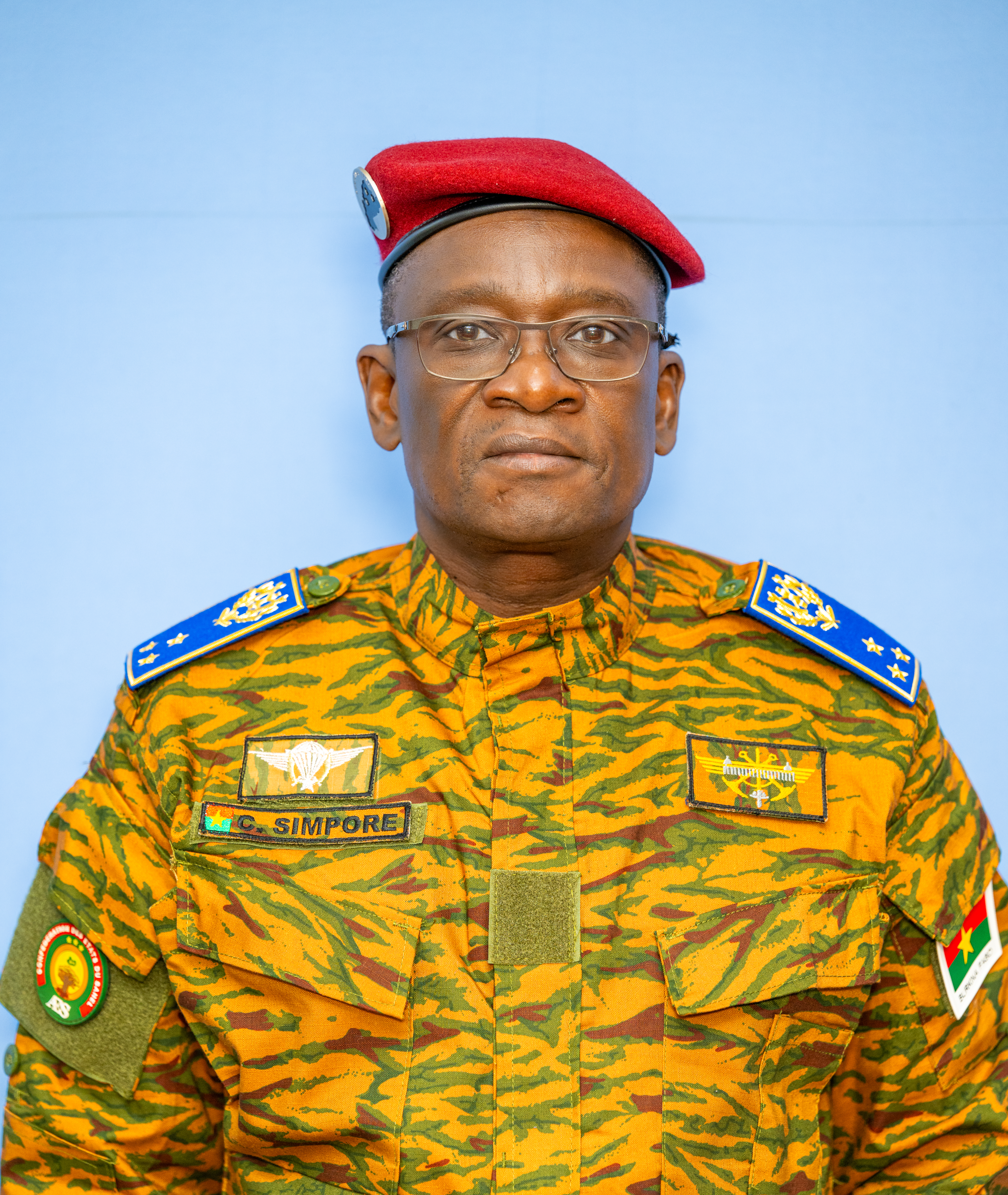
Official portrait.

Célestin Simporé is a senior Burkinabe military officer who has held the position of Ministry of War and Patriotic Defence since 2024. He was promoted to the rank of Major General in January 2026.

== Early life and education ==
Simporé was born on 17 August 1967. He obtained his baccalaureate) from the Bogodogo high school in Ouagadougou in 1989. From 1990 to 1993, he attended the Saint-Cyr Military Academy in France, where he trained as an officer cadet and earned his diploma as well as a parachutist's badge. In 1994, he obtained a certificate of application as a "combat section leader in the Engineering Corps" as well as a qualification in amphibious vehicle driving in Angers. Between 1999 and 2004, he pursued studies in civil engineering and environmental technology at the University of the Bundeswehr in Munich, Germany. He completed his academic career in 2014 with a Master II in political and social sciences (defense and industrial dynamics) at Paris-Panthéon-Assas University, the same year in which he also obtained a higher military studies diploma and a certification as an expert in management, command and strategy issued by the École de guerre - Terre.

== Military career ==
After returning to Burkina Faso, Simporé held the position of training officer at the Armed Forces Training Group (GIFA) in Bobo-Dioulasso between 1994 and 1995, before continuing at the Georges Namoano Military Academy in Pô. From 1996 to 1999, he successively held the positions of section leader, unit commander and head of department within the Military Engineering battalion, then at the central directorate of Engineering in Ouagadougou.. In February 2022, Simporé was appointed Deputy Chief of the General Staff of the Armed Forces (CEMGAA). In December of the same year, he combined this responsibility with that of Commander of Operations in the National Theater (COTN). On March 30, 2023, He acceded to the post of Chief of the General Staff of the Armed Forces (CEMGA) by presidential decree, succeeding Colonel-Major David Kabré.

== Government functions ==
On 8 December 2024, Simporé was appointed Minister of State, Minister of Defense and Veterans Affairs. By Presidential Decree No. 2025-1655/PF of December 30, 2025. He was promoted to major general effective from the New Year's Day.

== Awards ==
- Commander of the Order of the Stallion (2025)
- Officer of the Order of the Stallion (2020)
- Firefighters' Medal of Honour with gold clasp (2015)
- Military Medal of Honour
- Commemorative Medal with "Democratic Republic of Congo" clasp (2007)
- United Nations Medal (2006)
